= Unfinished Dream of All Living Ghost =

2023 bullet hell versus video game

- Game cover with silhouettes of (left to right) Chiyari Tenkajin, Son Biten, and Enoko Mitsugashira
- Developer: Team Shanghai Alice
- Publisher: Team Shanghai Alice
- Series: Touhou Project
- Platform: Windows
- Release: August 13, 2023
- Genres: Scrolling shooter, bullet hell (danmaku)
- Modes: Single-player, multiplayer

Touhou Juuouen ~ Unfinished Dream of All Living Ghost (東方獣王園 ~ Unfinished Dream of All Living Ghost.; lit. "Eastern Beast King Garden") is a split-screen, bullet hell vertically scrolling shooter developed by Team Shanghai Alice, serving as the nineteenth mainline and 32nd overall game of the Touhou Project series.

The game first announced on April 18, 2023; with a demo release May 7, 2023, at Reitaisai 20; and a full release August 13, 2023, at Comiket 102 with a Steam release the same day. Unfinished Dream of All Living Ghost features the split-screen feature characterized by Phantasmagoria of Dim. Dream and Phantasmagoria of Flower View.

== Gameplay ==
A match between Ran (left) and Tsukasa (right)

Unfinished Dream of All Living Ghost involves two players which dodge enemy bullets shot by various sprites on separate, individual screens as found in Phantasmagoria of Dim. Dream and Phantasmagoria of Flower View. The health bar allows for multiple hits before ending the match, and a mechanic, called Spell Cards, allows the player to release powerful attacks clearing enemy bullets off from them. Another mechanic, boss attacks and EX special attacks, summon a sprite of the character on the opponent’s side which fires enemy bullets at the opponent player with. A gauge called an " EX gauge" must be filled before using either one. A returning game mechanic, from Unconnected Marketeers and 100th Black Market, known as Ability cards, grant various buffs (i.e., decreased hitbox size or extra firepower).

Unfinished Dream of All Living Ghost features the typical Story mode found in previous Touhou games, where the player navigates through plot and dialogue throughout six stages, but also a multiplayer mode, where two players can compete against each other unlike in the game’s Story mode, where the player competes against a computer. In story mode, ability cards are granted corresponding to the defeated enemy. However, unlike most Touhou Project games, it lacks an Extra Stage even after completing story mode on a 1CC.

== Plot ==
Taking place after Unconnected Marketeers, Gensokyo’s land has lost ownership due to the opening of the markets. Without any ownership, spirits are able to invade the land and take over.

== Characters ==
Unfinished Dream of All Living Ghost features the second largest playable roster in the series’ history. Only Reimu Hakurei is playable from the start, as the rest are unlocked by beating another character's story.

=== Returning characters ===
- Reimu Hakurei (博麗 霊夢)
- Marisa Kirisame (霧雨 魔理沙)
- Sanae Kochiya (東風谷 早苗)
- Ran Yakumo (八雲 藍)
- Aunn Komano (高麗野 あうん)
- Nazrin (ナズーリン)
- Seiran (清蘭)
- Rin Kaenbyou (火焔猫 燐)
- Tsukasa Kudamaki (菅牧 典)
- Mamizou Futatsuiwa (二ッ岩 マミゾウ)
- Yachie Kicchou (吉弔 八千慧)
- Saki Kurokoma (驪駒 早鬼)
- Yuuma Toutetsu (饕餮 尤魔)
- Suika Ibuki (伊吹 萃香)

=== Newcomers ===
- Son Biten (孫 美天)
- Enoko Mitsugashira (三頭 慧ノ子)
- Chiyari Tenkajin (天火人 ちやり)
- Hisami Yomotsu (豫母都 日狭美)
- Zanmu Nippaku (日白 残無)

== Development ==
ZUN developed this game to feel like the previous entries in the series, putting a heavy emphasis on speed and tight dodging.
