= Touhou Bunkachou =

Touhou Bunkachou (Japanese: 東方文花帖) may refer to the following:

- Bohemian Archive in Japanese Red (Japanese: 東方文花帖 ～ Bohemian Archive in Japanese Red), the first official Touhou Project fanbook
- Shoot the Bullet (Japanese: 東方文花帖 ～ Shoot the Bullet), the 9.5th game in the Touhou Project series
- Double Spoiler (Japanese: ダブルスポイラー ～ 東方文花帖), the 12.5th game in the Touhou Project series
