= Violet Detector =

2018 video game

Hifuu Nightmare Diary ~ Violet Detector
- Developer(s): Team Shanghai Alice
- Publisher(s): Team Shanghai Alice
- Series: Touhou Project
- Platform(s): Windows
- Release: August 10, 2018 (C94)
- Genre(s): Shoot 'em up, photography

Hifuu Nightmare Diary ~ Violet Detector (秘封ナイトメアダイアリー 〜 Violet Detector., lit. "Secret Sealing Nightmare Diary") is the 16.5th Touhou Project game, released at the 94th Comiket on August 10, 2018. It is the third photography video game in the series, and introduces regular shot types alongside the camera, allowing the player to switch between using photographs to destroy bullets, and regular danmaku to deplete enemies of their health.

== Gameplay ==
Sumireko fighting Clownpiece's Spell Card

Violet Detector is a two-dimensional shoot 'em up game in which the player has to shoot at a single enemy boss to deplete them of their health, whilst avoiding their attacks. Unlike the previous photography Touhou games (Shoot the Bullet and Double Spoiler), the player's camera is not their only means of attack, and the gameplay is more characteristic of the regular Touhou games. The player has a regular shot, which is used to defeat enemies, and the camera holds a secondary role, being capable of removing enemy bullets, but it must be charged before it can be used. At least one photograph of the boss must be taken in order for a player to progress to the next stage.

In Violet Detector, each stage consists of only a single boss, who only has a single Spell Card. However, usage of the camera does not provide the player with invulnerability frames, and the player only has one life, which if lost, requires the entire level to be restarted from the beginning. The player is also given the ability to teleport to move out of the enemy's line of fire.

== Plot ==
Sumireko Usami, a magician high-school student from the Outside World (Earth), has the ability to visit Gensokyo, but only during her dreams. She has a recurring dream in which she is attacked by Reimu Hakurei without reason. Sumireko prepared to photograph the danmaku of Reimu and other residents of Gensokyo, for the purpose of uploading it to social media.

== Development ==
Violet Detector was announced on ZUN's blog and Twitter on July 19, 2018. The game was physically distributed on August 10 at the Summer Comiket, and released on Steam on the same day.

ZUN deliberately avoided adding new mechanics into Violet Detector that would make the game easier for newer players, as he wanted to provide players with the satisfaction of being able to complete the game with their own skill, stating in the game's afterword that games that endorse player skill have become less common.

== Reception ==
IGN gave the game a 7/10, saying that "Touhou Violet Detector is quite difficult, but both its story and mechanics deserve praise for their design." The game was criticised for being unforgiving for new players, and for the teleportation mechanic being awkward to use, suggesting that the implementation of difficulty settings and a dedicated teleport keybind would improve the game. On Steam, over 74% of player reviews were positive.
