= Fairy Wars =

2010 video game

- Developer: Team Shanghai Alice
- Publisher: Team Shanghai Alice
- Series: Touhou Project
- Platform: Microsoft Windows
- Release: August 14, 2010 (Comiket 78)
- Genre: Shoot 'em up
- Mode: Single-player

Fairy Wars (Japanese: 妖精大戦争 ～ 東方三月精, Hepburn: Yōsei Daisensō ~ Tōhō Sangetsusei; lit. "Great Fairy Wars ~ Eastern Three Fairies") is a shoot 'em up game, and is the 12.8th official game in the Touhou Project by the dōjin circle Team Shanghai Alice. The game was released on August 14, 2010, at Comiket 78. The game is the sequel to the Touhou Sangetsusei manga series. The game's illustrations were done by Makoto Hirasaka, the artist of the Touhou Sangetsusei series, instead of ZUN. The game is sometimes called FW or GFW for short.

== Gameplay ==
Cirno freezes a cluster of bullets.

The game plays somewhat like a fusion of the previous titles Shoot the Bullet and Phantasmagoria of Flower View, combined with "standard" Touhou gameplay. The player controls Cirno, who is able to shoot directly ahead of her to damage enemies, but also possesses a new "freezing" technique. Similar to Aya's camera in Shoot the Bullet, Cirno has a counter that fills up during gameplay, which determines the duration of her freeze attack, which is triggered by holding and then releasing the shot button. When activated, Cirno's freeze attack will freeze the immediate area directly in front of her, and freeze any bullets it comes in contact with before vanishing afterward. When other bullets come into contact with frozen bullets, they too will freeze, allowing for large chains of bullets to be frozen in this way. Points and bombs are awarded for freezing large numbers of bullets. In later stages, bullets are introduced that ignore freezing or create new bullets when they come into contact with frozen bullets.

Like the main-series games, Fairy Wars contains full stages each home to their own specific midboss and boss. However, Cirno is the only playable character, and there are only three stages during a playthrough instead of the usual six. On the other hand, there are four different "paths" the player may choose to take, which influence the stages they play. Three of the paths are playable upon starting, while the 4th path is unlockable. The three paths that are playable from the beginning also offers two different routes in which the story will progress.

== Characters ==
Fairy Wars does not introduce any new characters, but three characters from the Touhou official manga Eastern and Little Nature Deity and Strange and Bright Nature Deity make their game debuts as stage bosses.

- Cirno (チルノ, Chiruno): The main character of the game. She set out to find the ones responsible for trashing her dwelling and leaving an unsigned declaration of war.
- Sunny Milk (サニーミルク, Sanīmiruku): A cheerful fairy who likes to play pranks, often called "Sunny" by her accomplices. She manipulates the power of the Sun, namely the power to control reflection, with which can make things appear to be invisible. She considers herself the smartest of the three, though she fails often. She is from the manga Eastern and Little Nature Deity and Strange and Bright Nature Deity.
- Luna Child (ルナチャイルド, Runachairudo): A fairy who likes to play pranks, often called "Luna" by her accomplices. Her power comes from the Moon, and she can use it to silence the sounds around her. She seems to be the most cruel of the three. She is from the manga Eastern and Little Nature Deity and Strange and Bright Nature Deity.
- Star Sapphire (スターサファイア, Sutāsafaia): A fairy who likes to play pranks, often called "Star" by her accomplices and "Saphi" by the fans. Unlike the other two, her power does not wax and wane with the time of day. In reality, she seems to be the smartest of the three, and often escapes punishment while the other two are caught. She is from the manga Eastern and Little Nature Deity and Strange and Bright Nature Deity.
- Marisa Kirisame (霧雨 魔理沙, Kirisame Marisa): A magician who was just finishing her flower viewing and was suddenly challenged to a duel.
