= Double Dealing Character =

2013 bullet hell video game

- Original CD-ROM cover with a silhouette of Shinmyoumaru Sukuna
- Developer: Team Shanghai Alice
- Publishers: JP: Team Shanghai Alice; WW: Playism
- Composer: Team Shanghai Alice
- Series: Touhou Project
- Platform: Windows
- Release: JP: 12 August 2013 (Note: Double Dealing Character was sold on the final day of Comiket 84.); WW: 7 May 2015
- Genres: Scrolling shooter, bullet hell (danmaku)
- Mode: Single-player

Touhou Kishinjō ~ Double Dealing Character. (Japanese: 東方輝針城 ～ Double Dealing Character.; lit. "Eastern Castle of Radiant Needles") is the fourteenth main game of the Touhou Project scrolling shooter series made by the dōjin game maker Team Shanghai Alice. The demo was first released on May 26, 2013, at Reitaisai 10 and the full version of the game was released at Comiket 84 on August 12, 2013.

Double Dealing Character is the first Touhou title to be available online officially via digital distribution; all prior games were only available via CD purchase. On April 7, 2015, the game was announced for an international release by Playism, making Double Dealing Character the first game in the Touhou series to be released outside Japan. Double Dealing Character was also released on Steam on June 18, 2019.

== Gameplay ==
Reimu fighting Sekibanki, whose head has separated from her body.

Double Dealing Character follows the gameplay mechanics found in previous main games within the Touhou Project series with a spell card based danmaku system. The gameplay theme is neither novel nor retro. It is a "2000's neo-retro Danmaku shooter", creating simple gameplay while removing a lot of the complicated game mechanics. This is the first main game within the series that can display a resolution of 1280×960.

Players can choose between three protagonists: Reimu Hakurei, Marisa Kirisame and Sakuya Izayoi. Each character can choose from two shot types: one for which they take up their possessed weapon and another for leaving it behind.

The scoring system is focused around item collection. Collecting many items in one big scoop will award the player with bonus points based on how many items were collected. This is done by moving above a border near the top of the screen or by using a bomb. The point value can also be increased by grazing, shooting focused and cancelling out bullets (of which plays an important role in scoring again compared to Subterranean Animism through Ten Desires). Spell Card values have also been increased in comparison to previous games.

Bomb and life fragments are also present in this release. They can drop from bosses, as well as being awarded for item collection.

== Plot ==
Youkai are rioting and tsukumogami are turning up. Clouds gather, while a strong wind carries the sounds of a huge building. Gensokyo is full of sounds of dissonance. The weapons of the three protagonists start acting oddly; meanwhile, various youkai begin to rebel. It is their job to either take their weapons in hand and fight the youkai, or to cast their weapons aside.

== Characters ==
=== Playable characters ===
- Reimu Hakurei (博麗 霊夢) Reimu attacks with homing shots and her purification rod, or her needles.
- Marisa Kirisame (霧雨 魔理沙) Marisa attacks with lasers, fire, or missiles.
- Sakuya Izayoi (十六夜 咲夜) Sakuya attacks with her knives, or homing silver daggers.

=== Boss characters ===
- Cirno (チルノ) – The stage 1 mid-boss in this game. She has no dialogue and only has one spell on Hard and Lunatic mode.
- Wakasagihime (わかさぎ姫) – A mermaid and the stage 1 boss in this game. She seems to be influenced by the mallet's power and decides to attack the player.
- Sekibanki (赤蛮奇) – Stage 2 mid-boss and boss in this game. A rokurokubi who has the ability to make her head fly. She seems to be influenced by the mallet's power and decides to attack the player.
- Kagerou Imaizumi (今泉 影狼) – Stage 3 boss. A werewolf who has the ability to turn into a wolf during the full moon. Seen in the Bamboo Forest of the Lost causing havoc, she is easily defeated by the heroines and admits that she is not acting on her own will.
- Benben Tsukumo (九十九 弁々) – Benben is the stage 4B mid-boss and stage 4A boss and also the extra stage mid–boss. She is a tsukumogami created by the mallet's power. Therefore, she wants to stop the player from solving the incident, which would cause her returning into her base form, a biwa.
- Yatsuhashi Tsukumo (九十九 八橋) – Yatsuhashi is the stage 4A mid-boss and stage 4B boss and the extra stage mid–boss. She is also a tsukumogami created under the mallet's power, and considers Benben her sister. Her base form is a koto.
- Seija Kijin (鬼人 正邪) – Seija is the stage 5 mid-boss and boss and the stage 6 mid-boss. Seija is an amanojaku with the power of reversal who plots to create social upheaval to the world. She deceives Shinmyoumaru Sukuna that kobito are treated unfairly in the outside world. She also convinces Shinmyoumaru to use the Miracle Mallet to overthrow society. She would later appear in the spin-off game Impossible Spell Card as the playable character and main protagonist.
- Shinmyoumaru Sukuna (少名 針妙丸) – Shinmyoumaru is the stage 6 boss in this game. A kobito (little person) who is the descendant of the Inch-High Samurai, she is deceived by Seija and uses the Miracle Mallet to overthrow society.
- Raiko Horikawa (堀川 雷鼓) – Raiko is the extra boss in this game. She is a tsukumogami of a taiko that received the power from the mallet.

== Reception ==
Game Rant considered Double Dealing Character to be the 4th best game in the series, writing that "for gamers up to the challenge, Double Dealing Character will push you to your limits. Still, for those keen enough to learn the new rules and tricks, it should be worthwhile."
