= Legacy of Lunatic Kingdom =

2015 bullet hell video game

- Original CD-ROM cover, featuring a silhouette of Junko
- Developer: Team Shanghai Alice
- Publisher: Team Shanghai Alice
- Composer: Team Shanghai Alice
- Series: Touhou Project
- Platform: Microsoft Windows
- Release: JP: 14 August 2015 (Note: Legacy of Lunatic Kingdom was sold on the first day of Comiket 88.)
- Genre: Bullet hell (danmaku)
- Mode: Single-player

Touhou Kanjuden ~ Legacy of Lunatic Kingdom (Japanese: 東方紺珠伝 〜 Legacy of Lunatic Kingdom.; lit. "Eastern Tale of the Ultramarine Orb") is a scrolling shooter bullet hell game developed and published by Team Shanghai Alice. It is the 15th installment in the Touhou Project series. The story centers around the chosen heroine traveling to the Moon to stop an invasion and purification of Earth by the Lunarians.

The demo was first released on May 10, 2015 with a full release on August 14, 2015 at Comiket 88. It was released on Steam on April 1, 2019.

== Gameplay ==
The gameplay fundamentals of Legacy of Lunatic Kingdom are identical to previous games in the series: the player fights various common enemies in a stage with potential for a midboss encounter, and then a boss, who use Spell Cards to attack the player by firing bullets in specific patterns. Four characters can be selected this time around, each with their own unique storyline and dialogue. In Legacy of Lunatic Kingdom, shot types have been tied to characters and cannot be chosen.

Reimu fighting Seiran in the game's Legacy mode

However, Legacy of Lunatic Kingdom also differs greatly from the previous games in the series. The game has two main modes: Pointdevice Mode, or Legacy Mode. Legacy Mode retains the set lives system of previous Touhou games, with the opportunity to gain more, and to use continues, while Pointdevice Mode does not use lives at all, instead opting for a "chapter" system, which act as checkpoints. A level has multiple chapters, and every single unique boss attack in the game is also marked as a chapter. Whenever the player dies, they have the option of restarting from the previous chapter, with the only penalty being a loss of 0.01 shot power. As such, the gameplay loop has more in common with Shoot the Bullet than anything else. The game was balanced around Pointdevice Mode—being the intended way to play the game, and as such the game is arguably far harder on Legacy Mode than any other Touhou game in the series.

The main mechanic change other than Pointdevice Mode introduced in Legacy of Lunatic Kingdom is an expanded graze system. When grazing against enemy bullets, the graze counter will increase at a slow rate for as long as the player remains near the bullet. Power items and point items will also fall at a far slower rate than usual, turning deep crimson in appearance and shaking rapidly. If one continues to graze the same bullet for an extended period of time, the bullet releases a "graze item" which adds 5 grazes to the counter. This ties into the chapter system—as the player's performance is evaluated at the end of each chapter. This depends on the number of grazes and enemy kills the player has managed to achieve in that particular chapter, and scoring more than 1 million points will either grant the player a life piece (Legacy mode only), of which three form an extra life, or a bomb piece (Pointdevice Mode only), of which five form an extra bomb.

The criteria for endings are also different. If the player clears the game in Pointdevice Mode, or Legacy Mode without losing a single life, the player will receive the good ending for their respective character—otherwise, the bad ending will play. The Extra Stage is unlocked regardless of mode or ending upon the game's completion.

== Plot ==
=== Background ===
In the distant past on the Moon, the Lunarian goddess Chang'e orders her husband Hou Yi to kill the son of her rival Junko. In a grief-stricken fit of rage, Junko murders Hou Yi and becomes consumed in her anger, becoming a pure identity-less divine spirit in the process that lives solely to enact revenge on Chang'e. In this time, Chang'e drinks the Hourai Elixir, a forbidden elixir that forever immortalizes the user, tainting them with the concepts of life and death by its absence, and becomes imprisoned by the Lunarians for the eternal crime of ingesting it.

Some time after the events of Imperishable Night, Junko invades the Moon with an army of fairies, with the help of her friend Hecatia Lapislazuli, the goddess of Hell, to search for Chang'e. As a result, the Lunarian goddess Sagume Kishin orders the ruler of the Dream World, Doremy Sweet, to create a fake version of the Lunar Capital within the Dream World, so that the citizens of the Moon can temporarily live in peace while the empty Capital is ransacked without their knowledge. Realising that there is no real option of quelling Junko's anger and that Junko may well find their temporary home, Sagume starts to concoct the "Lunar Capital Transfer Plan", a plan to permanently relocate the Lunar Capital to Gensokyo by purifying the entire land.

Six months prior to the events of the game, the events of Urban Legend in Limbo occur, and one of the Occult Balls scattered in Gensokyo, the Lunar Capital ball, is intentionally planted by Sagume Kishin to start the plan.

In the present day, the Lunarian fugitives Kaguya Houraisan and Eirin Yagokoro discuss the potential Lunarian invasion in their home of Eientei, and Eirin conjures a special medicine, the Ultramarine Orb Elixir, which temporarily removes the impurity of death and allows the user to experience the immediate future. Eirin then asks Reisen Udongein Inaba, a fellow moon rabbit refugee who serves as her assistant and student, to deliver the elixir to Reimu Hakurei, Marisa Kirisame, and Sanae Kochiya, also telling her to drink it for herself. Meanwhile, a metallic spider-like rover from the Moon crashes into the Youkai Mountain and starts to roam around, purifying any land it passes by and leaving no signs of life. Reimu Hakurei and Sanae Kochiya both notice the rover's resemblance to NASA's Curiosity, and decide to investigate. Marisa Kirisame studies the Lunar Capital ball in her home, realising it is attracting the Lunarians, before Reisen enters and offers her the elixir, presumably before she also offers it to Reimu and Sanae. The chosen heroine then either drinks the elixir (Pointdevice Mode) or refuses it (Legacy Mode). ZUN has stated that the canon option is the heroine refusing the elixir and managing to avoid getting hit at all.

=== Main ===
While flying at the foot of the Youkai Mountain, the heroine encounters the frontline moon rabbit troops of the Eagle Ravi, a Lunarian Earth Recon Unit sent to purify the Earth, and encounters the low ranking infiltrator Seiran, who lets slip that their forward base is present at the mountain's lake. The heroine then encounters Ringo, a laid-back but high-ranking commander, who confesses that she doesn't care about the Lunarian army's plan, and directs the heroine to a hidden gate leading to the Dream World that the Lunarians use as a passage between Gensokyo and the fake Lunar Capital. In the Dream World, the heroine encounters Doremy Sweet, who tests the heroine's strength. She then directs them to the real Lunar Capital, against Sagume's instructions.

In the real Lunar Capital on the moon, the heroine encounters Sagume Kishin, who is initially quiet and does not respond to the heroine until she is defeated. Believing that the heroine can now solve her problem, Sagume then reveals the real purpose of the Lunarian invasion. Revealing that she can change the course of fate inversely with her words, her ability ensures the Lunar Capital Transfer Plan will not come to fruition as a result of her discussion. Sagume bets on the likelihood that the heroine will succeed, and directs them to the Sea of Tranquility.

At the Sea of Tranquility, the heroine encounters a barrage of hell fairies, who have overrun the moon. The leader of the hell fairies, Clownpiece, who has been given an order by Hecatia not to show visitors from the Lunar Capital mercy, then attacks the heroine. After she is defeated, she notes how pure Lunarians should not have been able to hurt her and her army, and reluctantly guides the heroine to the perpetrator of the incident, Junko. Depending on the player's results, Junko either states that she has lost before the battle even begins or berates the player for being surrounded by the stench of death. (Note: In Pointdevice Mode/Legacy Mode with no deaths, and Legacy Mode with a death or more, respectively) After defeating Junko, either the events of the Extra stage happen or the Lunarians start to inhabit Gensokyo against Eientei's wishes.

==== Extra Stage ====
After the hero defeats Junko, the invasion does not stop, and the residents of the fake Lunar Capital start to ponder if their reality is false. In a panic, Sagume descends to Gensokyo and asks the heroines to investigate in the Dream World once more. There, the heroine faces Doremy again, and comes face to face once more with Junko, now with Hecatia Lapislazuli. Junko reveals that she sent Hecatia into the Dream World previously during her invasion to prevent the Lunarian citizens from escaping the Dream World as her failsafe. The heroine battles Junko and Hecatia simultaneously, and once both are defeated, they finally yield with their plan and ask to be escorted to Eientei to meet Eirin, to which the heroine accepts.

== Development ==
ZUN first announced the game on his blog on April 22, 2015, confirming the title and the characters. He himself said that the game will have a huge departure from the original game's formula, and implementing "different" and challenging gameplay changes yet retaining the core elements of the series.

ZUN stated that he was inspired by games such as I Wanna Be The Guy, which feature extreme difficulty combined with the ability to freely retry each stage.

== Reception ==
Game Rant ranked Legacy of Lunatic Kingdom as the best game in the Touhou series, writing that "few games in the Touhou series are as accommodative and challenging in equal measure as Legacy of Lunatic Kingdom."
