= Hidden Star in Four Seasons =

2017 bullet hell video game

- Original cover with silhouettes of Okina Matara (center), Satono Nishida (left), and Mai Teireida (right).
- Developer: Team Shanghai Alice
- Publisher: Team Shanghai Alice
- Series: Touhou Project
- Platform: Windows
- Release: JP: August 11, 2017; WW: November 17, 2017
- Mode: Single-player

Touhou Tenkuushou ~ Hidden Star in Four Seasons (Japanese: 東方天空璋 〜 Hidden Star in Four Seasons.; lit. "Eastern Heavenly Jade Dipper") is the 16th game in the Touhou Project series. It was announced on the developer ZUN's blog on April 20, 2017. A playable demo was released on May 7, 2017, at Reitaisai 14, and the full version was released at Comiket 92 on August 11, 2017. The game was released on Steam worldwide on November 17, 2017, becoming the first game in the series to be available on the platform.

== Gameplay ==
Cirno fighting Nemuno Sakata, the Stage 2 boss

Hidden Star in Four Seasons is a vertically scrolling shoot 'em up game wherein an upward-facing player maneuvers around enemy projectiles and shoots projectiles at enemies and, though twice each stage, bosses which appear at the top of the screen.

Hidden Star in Four Seasons has a unique mechanic known as the Season Gauge. This gauge is filled by collecting season items, which appear when the player’s bullets connect with an enemy or when the player grazes an enemy bullet. When the season gauge is filled, a miniature orbital appears behind the player shooting smaller projectiles, and goes back to zero. The gauge can be refilled for a maximum of six orbitals. The projectiles shot and appearance of these orbitals differs depending on the “sub-season” chosen at the game’s beginning, which include:

- Spring: This option makes the orbitals appear as small Yin-Yang orbs. They fire small projectiles that home in on enemies and bosses.
- Summer: This option makes the orbitals appear as little rotating ice cubes. They shoot ice shards aimlessly in all directions in front of them.
- Fall: This makes the orbitals appear as crows. They shoot orange projectiles in the general shape of the letter V.
- Winter: This makes the orbitals appear as blue orbs with snowflakes inside of them. They shoot thin lasers.
- Dog days: This is a special sub-season only available in the Extra Stage. It appears as a small pink orb and shoots powerful projectiles behind the player.

Additionally, the player can use the season gauge to activate a season release by pressing the C key. This allows the player to use the season gauge to create a circle of varying sizes around the player character. This circle clears enemy bullets, but does not make the player invincible, and usually costs all of the mini orbitals and sets the season gauge back to zero, ready to be filled again.

== Plot ==
Despite it being midsummer, the seasons in various locations vary wildly. The Hakurei Shrine is showered in cherry petals, Youkai Mountain is basking in the middle of autumn, and the Forest of Magic is blanketed in snow, and thanks to some strange force, Gensokyo's fairies are running rampant with unfathomable strength. In the midst of this undeniable incident, the heroines, Reimu Hakurei, Marisa Kirisame, Aya Shameimaru, and Cirno set out to investigate and find the perpetrator behind it.

After searching through various areas in Gensokyo, the heroine of choice finds The Land of the Backdoor, a mysterious dimension full of misty purple smoke and doors that lead to various places across Gensokyo. Inside, the heroine finds Satono and Mai, whom after being fought, direct the heroine to Okina Matara, the perpetrator of the incident and the god who caused the seasons in Gensokyo to shift. Her true intention was to remind Gensokyo of her strength and to find replacements for her servants, Mai and Satono, and by causing the seasons to shift, she thought she brought out the strongest in Gensokyo and the people most fit to serve her. Unfortunately for Okina, all of the main heroines are deemed unfit to be her servants (Except for Marisa Kirisame, who declines of her own free will). This leads to a fight between Okina and the heroine, with the heroine, story-wise, ultimately losing and being forced out of The Land of the Backdoor.

== Characters ==
=== Playable characters ===
- Reimu Hakurei - Attacks with homing cherry blossom petals.
- Cirno - Attacks with icicles.
- Aya Shameimaru - Attacks with gusts of wind.
- Marisa Kirisame - Attacks with lasers.

=== Boss characters ===
- Eternity Larva - Stage 1 midboss, Stage 1 boss. She is a butterfly fairy and a possible god.
- Nemuno Sakata - Stage 2 midboss, Stage 2 boss. She is a yamanba.
- Lily White - Stage 3 midboss. She is a fairy who heralds the coming of spring.
- Aunn Komano - Stage 3 boss. She is a komainu who came to life. She watches over temples and shrines.
- Narumi Yatadera - Stage 4 boss. She is a jizo statue who lives in the Forest of Magic.
- Satono Nishida - Stage 5 midboss, Stage 5 boss (with Mai), Extra Stage midboss (with Mai). She is one of Okina’s servants and dancers.
- Mai Teireida - Stage 4 midboss, Stage 5 boss (with Satono), Extra Stage midboss (with Satono). She is one of Okina’s servants and dancers.
- Okina Matara - Stage 6 boss, Extra Stage boss. She is a secret god with many names and titles. She is also the main antagonist. She lives in the Land of the Back Door with her servants.

== Reception ==
Game Rant considered Hidden Star in Four Seasons to be the third best game in the series, and commented that it had a more complex story than usual. They also wrote that it has "relatively more detailed visuals, and everything about the characters and scenery stands out. If players looking for some respite from the 'yokai' and 'bishojo' or just a deeper, better-defined story, consider playing this game."
