= Sunken Fossil World =

2021 video game

- Developers: Twilight Frontier; Team Shanghai Alice
- Publisher: Twilight Frontier
- Series: Touhou Project
- Platforms: Windows, Nintendo Switch
- Release: Windows: JP: October 24, 2021; WW: October 20, 2022; Switch: WW: October 20, 2022
- Genres: Bullet hell, platform, boss rush
- Mode: Single-player

Touhou Gouyoku Ibun ~ Sunken Fossil World (Japanese: 東方剛欲異聞 ～ 水没した沈愁地獄; lit. "Strange Tale of Avarice ~ Submerged Hell of Sunken Sorrow") is a shoot 'em up platform game developed by Team Shanghai Alice and Twilight Frontier numbered as the 17.5th game of the Touhou Project series. Sunken Fossil World was fully released on October 22, 2022, featuring new playable characters with its semi-full release on October 24, 2021, at Autumn Reitaisai 9 after two demo releases prior on October 6, 2019, and October 18, 2020. On the official website, it is described as a "horizontal side-scrolling danmaku water action game". It consists entirely of boss fights unlike the pre-boss and boss fight stage structure found from most Touhou Project games.

== Gameplay ==
Sunken Fossil World involves bullet hell gameplay containing a boss rush style where continual boss fights of set number occur with dialogue between two characters preceding each boss fight and, during each one, there being platforms which differ depending on the boss fight.

== Development ==
Like all previous Touhou Project spinoffs where Twilight Frontier was involved, ZUN, or Team Shanghai Alice, only oversaw the development of Sunken Fossil World while Twilight Frontier actually developed the game.

Compared to other Touhou Project games, Sunken Fossil World's development occurred with more intervals, divided into a first trial demo, a second trial demo, and a full release after three delays. Sunken Fossil World's first trial demo was released on October 6, 2019, showcasing only three different boss fights. Sunken Fossil World's second trial demo was released on October 18, 2020, which significantly added more material including a final boss for all the playable characters at the time. Sunken Fossil World was set to fully release at Reitaisai 18 on March 21, 2021, but it was announced that Sunken Fossil World would be further delayed due to parts of the game still not yet being developed and a last-minute attempt being disregarded, as this was said would lead to "omission of the contents" and "would leave some concerns about the development and that it would take time to update the game in response after release". It was then set for an August release, but this too was delayed to September and then October. Because of delays, the game presents a subtitle of "17.5", despite being released after the 18th Touhou game, Unconnected Marketeers.

The game was released at the Autumn Reitaisai 9 on October 24, 2021, and released on Steam on October 29, 2021. The game was updated to Ver 1.02 on November 2, 2021, shortly after its release with a bug patch.

A Nintendo Switch port as well as an update featuring new playable characters and storylines was announced in May 2022. This was released on October 20, 2022, and also added English and Chinese language support to both versions of the game.

== Soundtrack ==
The game's soundtrack consists of content from other Touhou Project games remixed by ziki_7, apart from the final boss themes, which are new compositions by ZUN.
