= Urban Legend in Limbo =

2015 video game

- Developers: Twilight Frontier; Team Shanghai Alice
- Publisher: Twilight Frontier
- Series: Touhou Project
- Platforms: Microsoft Windows, PlayStation 4
- Release: May 10, 2015 (Windows) December 8, 2016 (PlayStation 4)
- Genre: Fighting
- Modes: Single-player, multiplayer

Touhou Shinpiroku ~ Urban Legend in Limbo. (Japanese: 東方深秘録 ～ Urban Legend in Limbo.; lit. "Eastern Record of Deep Mysteries") is a fighting game developed by Twilight Frontier and Team Shanghai Alice and published by Twilight Frontier. It is the 14.5th installment in the Touhou Project series and the first game to be illustrated by Moe Harukawa (who worked on Forbidden Scrollery). It was released in May 2015.

A PlayStation 4 port was released on December 8, 2016, making Urban Legend in Limbo the first official Touhou game to be available on a gaming console. The PS4 port features Reisen Udongein Inaba as a new character, as well as an extra story that takes place after the events of Legacy of Lunatic Kingdom.

== Gameplay ==
Marisa performing an uppercut on Kokoro.

Like its predecessor, Urban Legend in Limbo is a two-dimensional versus fighting game, where two characters fight each other with various moves. The system used is similar to its predecessors with several balance tweaks and fixes, as well as an improved spell card system.

== Plot ==
A series of false rumours spread around the Human Village, rumours of odd creatures and strange events. Unlike the Youkai, however, the nature of these rumours is foreign and unsettling, scaring the human children (although most of adults regard it is as simple child's play). But when Reimu, the Shrine Maiden of the Hakurei Shrine, started to notice the rumors, she concluded that it must be the work of a higher power. With that, she and the others decided to investigate this new incident and find the culprit behind the rumors.

== Characters ==
Up to 14 characters are playable in the game, each with their own scenario. The complete cast of Hopeless Masquerade re-appear in this game, plus four new characters; two from previous games, one originally from a manga, and one début. Each character is associated with an urban legend in the game, which manifests most evidently in the character's ultimate attack.

Returning from Hopeless Masquerade:

- Reimu Hakurei – Her urban legend is the Woman of the Gap (隙間女, Sukimaonna).
- Marisa Kirisame – Her urban legend is the Seven School Mysteries (学校の七不思議).
- Ichirin Kumoi – Her urban legend is the Hasshaku-sama (八尺さま)
- Byakuren Hijiri – Her urban legend is the Turbo Granny (ターボババァ)
- Mononobe no Futo – Her urban legend is the Banchō Sarayashiki.
- Toyosatomimi no Miko – Her urban legend is the Red Cape, Blue Cape.
- Nitori Kawashiro – Her urban legend is the Loch Ness Monster.
- Koishi Komeiji – Her urban legend is Mary-san's Phone (メリーさんの電話).
- Mamizou Futatsuiwa – Her urban legend is the Men in black.
- Hata no Kokoro – Her urban legend is the Kuchisake-onna.

New entrants:

- Fujiwara no Mokou – From Imperishable Night. Her urban legend is spontaneous human combustion.
- Shinmyoumaru Sukuna – From Double Dealing Character. Her urban legend is the little green men.
- Kasen Ibaraki (茨木 華扇) – From the manga Wild and Horned Hermit. She is a sennin that is introduced as "the one-armed, horned hermit", hinting that she might be an oni. Her urban legend is the Monkey's Paw.
- Sumireko Usami (宇佐見 菫子) – New character. A psychic high-school student from the outside world who came into Gensokyo looking for esoterica. When she entered high school, she formed an occult organization known as the "Secret Sealing Club", dedicated to exposing secrets of the world. That led her to discover the way into Gensokyo through special stones. She became friends with the people living there, however she discovered that one of the stones were switched, causing rumors and urban legends to spread inside Gensokyo. She calls her urban legend the Seven Strange Wonders of the World (深・世界七不思議; a Japanese play on words on the Seven Wonders of the World), though she reveals that her urban legend is actually the doppelganger.
- Reisen Udongein Inaba – PlayStation 4 exclusive character from Imperishable Night. Her urban legend is the Kunekune.

== Development ==
The game was first announced by ZUN on November 16, 2014, at the Digital Game Expo 2014 alongside Danmaku Amanojaku Gold Rush. During that event, cards were handed down to the attendees regarding the game's announcement, with an illustration of Marisa Kirisame done by Moe Harukawa. ZUN later confirmed the game in his tweet on December 22, 2014. The playable demo became available on Comiket 87 on December 29, 2014.
