= Antinomy of Common Flowers =

2017 video game

- Developers: Twilight Frontier; Team Shanghai Alice
- Publishers: Twilight Frontier; Team Shanghai Alice; Sunfish (Windows); Phoenixx (PS4/Switch)
- Series: Touhou Project
- Platforms: Microsoft Windows, PlayStation 4, Nintendo Switch
- Release: December 29 2017: Trailer; WW: December 11, 2016 1st Trial; WW: May 7, 2017 2nd Trial; WW: October 15, 2017 Comiket; WW: December 29, 2017 Dōjin shop; WW: December 31, 2017 Steam; WW: January 5, 2018 PlayStation 4, Nintendo Switch; WW: April 22, 2021
- Genre: Fighting
- Modes: Single-player, multiplayer

Touhou Hyouibana ~ The Antinomy of Common Flowers (東方憑依華 ～ Antinomy of Common Flowers.; lit. "Flowers of Possession"), often abbreviated to AoCF, is a fighting video game developed by Twilight Frontier and published by Team Shanghai Alice for Microsoft Windows in 2017. It is the latest fighting game in the Touhou Project series, being a continuation of the extra story mode from Urban Legend in Limbo's PlayStation 4 port, released in 2016.

Antinomy of Common Flowers ports for the PlayStation 4 and Nintendo Switch port were announced in May 2019, and released on April 22, 2021.

== Gameplay ==
Marisa (left) uses a special move on Mokou (right)

Antinomy of Common Flowers is a fighting game in which the player will attempt to deplete their opponent's health bar using various moves, such as basic punches and kicks, as well as more complex special moves, which require special inputs in order to be performed. Spell cards, special moves that are considerably more powerful than the regular special moves, can also be used by charging a meter through damaging the opponent, which once full, allows the spell card to be activated. Each character in the game has a total of three spell cards to choose from. Antinomy of Common Flowers has no ground, allowing for complex aerial movement.

In Antinomy of Common Flowers, the player will control two characters in any given match. The 'master' is the main character that they control, and can temporarily switch to their 'slave', who can be used to quickly extend combos. Additionally, when the player takes damage, some of their health will be retained with a white bar, and when playing as a slave, the white health will slowly increase. Taking damage while playing as the slave character will decrease the player's 'occult meter', and if it is emptied, the player will be forced to switch back to the master, until the meter increases again, which will gradually happen by default, but it can be increased faster by damaging their opponent.

In Antinomy of Common Flowers, the player can engage in single matches, either against the AI or with other players online, play a training mode in which they can freely test their attacks, or in the game's story mode, wherein the player will fight many enemies in succession, and can unlock new characters by defeating them.

== Plot ==
As part of the Urban Legend Incident, a phenomenon called "Perfect Possession" occurs, in which people have their mind and body completely taken over by somebody else. Reimu sets out to investigate the cause of the Perfect Possession.

== Characters ==
In Antinomy of Common Flowers, all characters except Joon and Shion are available from the start in the game's versus mode. In the story mode, the player is given preset master-slave pairs, more of which are unlocked by completing the game with specific characters. The game has a total of 19 characters, each of which has their own stage.

- Reimu Hakurei — Miko of the Hakurei Shrine. Her attacks are a mixture of regular melee moves and danmaku. Reimu is the first character available in story mode, with Kasen as her slave.
- Marisa Kirisame — Human magician. Her fighting style is reliant on her high speed.
- Ichirin Kumoi — A youkai monk. Though she is slow, Ichirin is able to perform danmaku through the control of her partner, Unzan.
- Byakuren Hijiri — Youkai magician and the monk of the Myouren temple, a Buddhist temple that accepts yokai.
- Mononobe no Futo — Taoist and shikaisen who can manipulate feng shui. Her attacks use her speed, and plates to inflict damage.
- Toyosatomimi no Miko — A saint whose design is derived from Prince Shōtoku. Her fighting style is reliant on the Occult Special Move, which can strengthen either her projectiles or her melee attacks.
- Nitori Kawashiro — A kappa and engineer. Her various weapons allow for multiple types of danmaku.
- Koishi Komeiji — A satori who was shunned by humans, and closed her third eye to seal her power.
- Mamizou Futatsuiwa — A bake-danuki from the Outside World. Her attacks involve sending out small tanuki to perform danmaku for her.
- Hata no Kokoro — A menreiki who is incapable of facial expression, using a variety of masks to manipulate her emotions instead. This corresponds to her fighting style, wherein her attacks will change depending on what mask she is wearing.
- Kasen Ibaraki — An ibaraki-dōji and one of the Sages of Gensokyo. She attacks using her pets and her arm, which she can detach from her body.
- Fujiwara no Mokou — A human who gained immortality by drinking the Hourai Elixir. She uses close range attacks, many of which contain fire.
- Shinmyoumaru Sukuna — An inchling, whose Miracle Mallet is capable of granting wishes to other inchlings. Her speed and small stature allow her to perform melee attacks with a bowl and needle.
- Sumireko Usami — Human magician from Kantō who can visit Gensokyo in her dreams. She is a zoner who uses her ESP to create rubble and projectiles around her opponents.
- Reisen Udongein Inaba — A moon rabbit, who can manipulate insanity in humans.
- Doremy Sweet — Baku who can manipulate dreams. She can steal "dream souls" from her opponents, which will increase the damage of her spell card.
- Tenshi Hinanawi — A tennin who came to Gensokyo due to boredom with life in Heaven. She is an all purpose fighter, and her Sword of Scarlet Thought can change shape depending on the situation.
- Yukari Yakumo — Youkai who can manipulate boundaries, including those with the Outside World. This also applies to her attacks, which allow her to materialise objects out of nowhere.
- Joon Yorigami — A goddess of pestilence who is habitually poor, but nonetheless liked by those around her. Joon becomes a playable character after being defeated in the story mode.
- Shion Yorigami — Joon's younger sister, a goddess of poverty who brings misfortune onto herself and others. She is Joon's slave, and the only non-player character.

== Development ==
Antinomy of Common Flowers was first announced via ZUN's blog in December 2016. The game was then released at Comiket 93 on December 29, 2017, and on Steam on January 5, 2018. PlayStation 4 and Nintendo Switch ports were first announced in May 2019, and on March 21, 2021, Phoenixx produced a promotional video, which revealed a final release date of April 22, 2021. The Switch and PS4 version of Antinomy of Common Flowers use an English fan patch, making it the first Touhou game to be officially released in a language other than Japanese.

== Reception ==
IGN Japan gave the PC version a score of 8.5/10, praising the game's music, the originality of the story, and how the gameplay allowed for a variety of fighting styles, and was very accessible for people who were new to either Touhou or fighting games in general. However, they complained that a lack of players made it difficult to find matches with other people online. Movies Games and Tech gave particular attention to the large number of characters and gameplay options, but criticised the game's input lag and lack of voice acting.
