= Photography video game =

Video game genre

A photography video game is a video game genre in which taking photographs using the in-game camera system is a key game mechanic. Photography games often employ mechanics similar to first-person shooters, but rather than using a gun to kill enemies, the goal is to use a camera to photograph items in the game world. Depending on the game, the act might incapacitate or defeat enemies, or the player might receive points or experience according to the composition of the photograph. The earliest game in the genre is Nessie, originally written for the Atari 8-bit computers in 1984, then converted to and first published for the Commodore 64. The goal is to take a photo of the Loch Ness Monster.

Photography elements can be the only significant mode of gameplay, as in Pokémon Snap or Afrika, or they can be used in combination with other gameplay modes such as action-adventure in Beyond Good & Evil or survival horror in Fatal Frame and Dead Rising.

== Origins ==
The first known photography game is Nessie, designed and programmed by Tom R. Halfhill for the Atari 8-bit computers in 1984 and converted to the Commodore 64 by Charles Brannon. The C64 version was published first in 1984 in COMPUTE!'s Second Book of Commodore 64 Games as a type-in program. The Atari original followed in 1985 in COMPUTE's Atari Collection Volume 1. The accompanying article describes the concept:

The game was inspired by a TV documentary on Loch Ness which recounted the hundreds of attempts to photograph the monster. Almost all of these attempts have failed; there exist only a few controversial photos showing parts of fins, shadowy shapes, and blurred figures. The game simulates some of the difficulties faced by would-be photographers of Nessie.

In Nessie, the player has a camera with a 20-exposure roll of film and multiple lenses to choose from. The goal is to get a clear photo of the Loch Ness monster and not be fooled by other creatures in the water such as fish and eels. After taking 20 shots, the film is developed and can be reviewed.

== Later games ==
In Gekibo: Gekisha Boy, released in 1992 for the PC Engine, the player controls a reticle representing a camera viewfinder moving over the screen. Another early photography game was the 1995 full-motion video game Paparazzi!: Tales of Tinseltown, although the limitations of the FMV format meant players had little control over what they photographed.

The 1999 game Pokémon Snap for the Nintendo 64–a photography game in the Pokémon universe using rail shooter mechanics–sold well and was critically acclaimed. It inspired other safari and scuba diving photography games such as Endless Ocean (2007), Afrika (2008), Beyond Blue (2020) and a sequel New Pokémon Snap (2021). Pictures from Pokémon Snap could be copied from the cartridge and printed at branches of Blockbuster Video, while players of Firewatch could have the photographs on their in-game camera "developed" and delivered to their home.

In survival horror, the Fatal Frame series (also known as Project Zero) debuted in 2001 and turned photography into an attacking move. Players are tasked with photographing aggressive ghosts, with well focused and composed shots doing more damage. The series has six instalments including one augmented reality game, Spirit Camera, that uses the real camera on the Nintendo 3DS. Phasmophobia and the Outlast series are other survival horror games that give players cameras but no weapons; the aim is to record the monsters and escape without being killed.

Several games with photojournalist protagonists implemented photography sidequests. These include Beyond Good & Evil (2003), Dead Rising (2006) and Spider-Man 3 (2007). The Touhou Project series games Shoot the Bullet, Double Spoiler, and Violet Detector use photojournalist protagonists to combine photography and bullet hell mechanics, with points awarded for the number of bullets in a photo.

Snapshot (2012) and Viewfinder (2023) use photography mechanics to change the level itself. Photographs taken in one part of the level can be pasted elsewhere in order to create new paths and objects.

The genre saw a resurgence in the 2020s with the release of indie games such as Sludge Life, Eastshade (which applies photography game mechanics to landscape painting), Shutter Stroll, Umurangi Generation, Nuts, and Season. These fuse photography mechanics with the walking simulator genre to produce slow-paced games, often with environmental themes, as a response to the fast-paced and violent nature of shooter games. The adventure games Toem (2021) and Toem 2 (2026) use photography to solve puzzles and requests while exploring monochrome environments. A 2026 example, Flock Around, uses birdwatching and online cooperative play, with players photographing birds in a nature reserve to complete a guidebook. An earlier predecessor in the same vein is Infra, from 2016, in which the player character is a structural engineer doing survey work. The camera can be used to photograph either decaying infrastructure in need of repair, or documents connected to a background story about corruption.

== See also ==
- Virtual photography, screenshots of video games as an art form
- Purikura, a genre of arcade games involving photography
