= Wily Beast and Weakest Creature =

2019 bullet hell video game

- Developer: Team Shanghai Alice
- Publisher: Team Shanghai Alice
- Series: Touhou Project
- Platform: Microsoft Windows
- Release: August 12, 2019 (Comiket 96)
- Genre: Vertical danmaku scrolling shooter
- Mode: Single-player

Touhou Kikeijuu ~ Wily Beast and Weakest Creature (Japanese: 東方鬼形獣 〜 Wily Beast and Weakest Creature.; lit. "Eastern Beast in Oni's Shape") is the 17th main game in the Touhou Project and the 24th game overall. It was announced on ZUN's blog on April 17, 2019. A playable demo was released on May 5, at Reitaisai 16, and the full version was released at Comiket and on Steam on August 12, at Comiket 96.

== Gameplay ==
Wily Beast and Weakest Creature is a vertical danmaku game. The player shoots enemies as they come from the top of the screen while attempting to dodge their attacks and fighting a boss at the end of each stage. During difficult sections, the player can use Spell Cards to clear the screen of bullets, but have a limited number available to them, meaning they must be used cautiously. However, they can enter Focus Mode at any time, which lets them deal more damage in a concentrated area, at the cost of movement speed. Enemies who are killed will drop either Power, which increases the player's damage, or Point Items, which contribute to replenishing the player's lives and spell cards.

Marisa attacks a group of enemy fairies. Multiple power-ups, including an Animal Spirit Item, are on-screen.

The available player characters are Reimu, Marisa, and Youmu. Reimu is the slowest character but has homing bullets. Marisa is faster and can collect items more easily. Youmu is the fastest character and her focused shot can deal heavy amounts of damage at once, but requires a few seconds to charge.

Instead of a shot type, Wily Beast and Weakest Creature features three different "animal spirits" for the player to choose from, each with distinct abilities. The personality of the player character also changes, depending on which spirit they have equipped.

- Wolf spirit increases damage dealt while focused. The player character's personality becomes 'barbaric'.
- Otter spirit makes the Spell Card more powerful and gives one extra Spell Card at the start of the game. The player character's personality becomes 'wishy-washy'.
- Eagle spirit increases damage while unfocused. The player character's personality becomes 'haughty'.

Somewhat similar to Undefined Fantastic Object, some enemies will drop Animal Spirit Items upon death, the spirits corresponding to the same types selected at the beginning of the game. Upon collecting any combination of five spirits, the player will enter 'Roaring Mode' and during which they will be given a temporary shield that will clear the screen of bullets if the player is hit but end prematurely, as seen in Perfect Cherry Blossom If the player has collected three of a specific spirit type, either wolf, otter, or eagle, the player will also be granted a special bonus in addition to the shield when roaring mode activates. Three wolf spirits will improve the damage and size of the focused shot, three otter spirits will create three rotating shields around the player and turn any bullets that come into contact with them into point items, and three eagle spirits will improve the damage and size of the unfocused shot. The effects of these are accentuated if they correspond to the player's selected spirit type.

ZUN said that he believed Wily Beast and Weakest Creature is the easiest Touhou game in the series. It is the first main-series Touhou game to include achievements.

== Plot ==
Animal spirits come to Gensokyo, under the pretext of an invasion. In actuality, they had no intent on invading and merely caused a commotion to get the nearby humans to enter the Animal Realm, located in Hell, to stop Mayumi Joutouguu, who has created an army of living haniwa, which threatens to interfere with the natural order. The player character takes an animal spirit, and enters Hell through the Sanzu River. Upon entering the Animal Realm, and confronting Keiki Haniyasushin, the animal spirit takes over their body but does not act malignantly, as it has the same goal as the player character. After defeating Keiki, she accepts her defeat, offering to make an idol for Reimu, or a life-size figure of Marisa, though she declines this offer. However, Keiki is effectively exiled from Hell, and ostracised on Earth, a condition to which Youmu is sympathetic.

== Characters ==
=== Playable characters ===
- Reimu Hakurei – Miko of the Hakurei Shrine. Reimu was doubtful of the authenticity of the invasion, but went along, knowing she could kill the animal spirit without a problem if it turned out to be false.
- Marisa Kirisame – A careless and kleptomaniacal magician. She was excited to get the power of an animal spirit, and a chance to go to Hell.
- Youmu Konpaku – A half-ghost who wields two swords. She only took action as if Keiki went ignored, it would have caused problems in Hell's ecosystem.

=== Enemy characters ===
- Eika Ebisu – Stage 1 midboss and boss, the spirit of a mizuko (stillborn child), who stacks stones around the Sanzu River. She is angry at the protagonist for knocking down the stones during the stone stacking contest. Eika is based on Ebisu.
- Urumi Ushizaki – Stage 2 midboss and boss, an Ushi-Oni who can control the weight of objects. She carries a baby made of rock.
- Kutaka Niwatari – Stage 3 midboss and boss, and Extra Stage midboss. Kutaka is based on Niwatari-jin, a Japanese god of chickens.
- Yachie Kicchou – Stage 4 midboss and boss, a dragon turtle who orchestrates the pseudo-invasion. She is the leader of the otter spirits.
- Mayumi Joutouguu – Stage 5 midboss and boss and Final Stage midboss. She is a living haniwa, and subordinate to Keiki.
- Keiki Haniyasushin – Final Stage boss. A goddess who can create living haniwa, and makes peace with Reimu, Marisa and Youmu. The animal spirits consider her as a threat. Keiki is based on Haniyasu no kami.
- Saki Kurokoma – Extra Stage boss. A kurokoma who unsuccessfully tries to overthrow Hell after hearing of Keiki's defeat. She is the leader of the Keiga family of wolf spirits. Saki is based on Kai-no-Kurokoma, Prince Shōtoku's legendary flying horse.

== Reception ==
Shin Imai, writing for IGN, gave Wily Beast and Weakest Creature a 7/10. He praised the abundance of gameplay options offered by the multiple characters/animal spirits. However, while he did enjoy the general gameplay and the fact that challenging segments were approachable, he criticised the Animal Spirit Item collection mechanics for being confusing and too difficult for new players, and also said the level design felt "a little loose." He went on to say that while it was one of the easiest Touhou games, its difficulty overall made it hard to recommend to people otherwise unfamiliar with the genre.

On Steam, over 97% of users gave the game a positive review.
