= 100th Black Market =

2022 video game

Barettofiriatachi no Yami-Ichiba ~ 100th Black Market
- Developer: Team Shanghai Alice
- Publisher: Team Shanghai Alice
- Series: Touhou Project
- Platform: Windows
- Release: August 14, 2022 (C100)
- Genre: Shoot 'em up

Barettofiriatachi no Yami-Ichiba ~ 100th Black Market (バレットフィリア達の闇市場 〜 100th Black Market; lit. "Bulletphiles' Black Market") is the 18.5th Touhou Project game. It was first announced at Touhou Yomoyama News on July 21, 2022, and released at the 100th Comiket on August 14, 2022, with a Steam release on August 14, 2022.

== Gameplay ==
The gameplay of 100th Black Market is a bullet hell where the player controls Marisa Kirisame. As in Unconnected Marketeers, the gameplay involves collecting ability cards as the player challenges each stage repeatedly, with additional cards included in this game.

The game emphasizes short runs through stages with a large amount of randomization. Players select stages and focus on collecting additional Ability Cards that affect the strategies available in each run.

== Plot ==
Set after the events of Unconnected Marketeers, in 100th Black Market, Marisa Kirisame sets off alone to investigate an incident where the value of ability cards are increasing, due to the opening of a black market where the gods are unable to intervene.

== Development ==
100th Black Market was announced on ZUN's blog in late July 2022, and released on August 14, 2022. The game was made to commemorate the 100th Comiket, and the 25th anniversary of the Touhou Project series.

== Reception ==
IGN Japan gave 100th Black Market an 8/10. Hata Fuminobu from IGN Japan pointed the random generation of stages brings pressure to players, praised the numerous characters appearing in the game, creating a sense of reunion, and criticized the game for lacking plot and new songs.
