= Double Spoiler =

2010 video game

- Developer: Team Shanghai Alice
- Publisher: Team Shanghai Alice
- Series: Touhou Project
- Platform: Microsoft Windows
- Release: March 14, 2010
- Genre: Shoot 'em up photography
- Mode: Single-player

Double Spoiler ~ Touhou Bunkachou (Japanese: ダブルスポイラー ～ 東方文花帖; lit. "Double Spoiler ~ Eastern Cultural Album") is a shoot 'em up photography game, and is the 12.5th official game in the Touhou Project by the dōjin circle Team Shanghai Alice. It was first released in the 7th Reitaisai on March 14, 2010. In English speaking circles, the game's title is often shortened to just Double Spoiler, and abbreviated to DS.

== Gameplay ==
Double Spoiler inherited the system of its predecessor Shoot the Bullet, where the player cannot shoot projectiles at enemies; instead, the main character must shoot photographs to clear the screen of bullets and take down bosses. Scores are determined by the aesthetics of each photograph taken, such as colours and bullet density, and the risk taken to take these photos. For each "scene", the player is only given one life to complete the objective — to take a certain number of pictures of the boss without being hit in a limited amount of time.

Aya preparing to photograph Nazrin. The circle around Nazrin shows how close Aya must get in order to get a photograph.

To take pictures, the film must be fully loaded into the camera (100%). The player can move at three speeds, the normal speed, the focused speed, and a super-focused speed which also allows for high speed film loading. When taking pictures, the player can hold the shoot button to control the viewfinder while the picture frame shrinks — this can be used to zoom in on the boss. During this time, all bullets on screen are slowed down and the player cannot move. If the shoot button is held for too long, the film will get exposed and the player would have to reload the film. The player can also press the shoot button once without holding to take a snapshot around the player character. For every picture taken, the player will need to reload the film from 0% again before they can take another picture. Only photos that contain an image of the boss ("Success" pictures) will be taken into account when tallying up the score.

New to Double Spoiler over Shoot the Bullet is the option to change the orientation of the shot between landscape to portrait. The angle of the shot is automatically adjusted depending on where the player is in relation to the boss.

== Characters ==
- Aya Shameimaru: One of the main characters of Double Spoiler and boss of Level Spoiler. As the tengu reporter of the Gensokyo newspaper Bunbunmaru Shinbun, she goes to search for suitable news topics by taking pictures of bullet patterns with her analog camera. No one actually knows what she does with these pictures except herself.
- Hatate Himekaidou: Second main character of Double Spoiler and boss of Level Spoiler. Hatate is a modern tengu reporter who makes a newspaper called Kakashi Nenpo. Unlike Aya, she never goes outside for her newspaper research, but instead uses her ability called "spirit photography". After reading Aya's Bunbunmaru Shinbun newspaper, she decided to observe Aya's way of gathering information for her articles.

The subjects: (all bosses from past Windows Touhou Project installments)

- Level 1: Minoriko Aki, Shizuha Aki
- Level 2: Parsee Mizuhashi, Hina Kagiyama
- Level 3: Yamame Kurodani, Kogasa Tatara, Kisume
- Level 4: Nitori Kawashiro, Momizi Inubashiri
- Level 5: Ichirin Kumoi, Minamitsu Murasa
- Level 6: Yugi Hoshiguma, Suika Ibuki
- Level 7: Syou Toramaru, Nazrin
- Level 8: Rin Kaenbyou, Utsuho Reiuzi
- Level 9: Satori Komeiji, Koishi Komeiji
- Level 10: Tenshi Hinanai, Iku Nagae
- Level 11: Kanako Yasaka, Suwako Moriya
- Level 12: Byakuren Hiziri, Nue Houjuu
- Level Ex: Reimu Hakurei, Marisa Kirisame, Sanae Kotiya
- Level Spoiler: Hatate Himekaidou, Aya Shameimaru

== Reception ==
In the 7th Reitaisai dōjin convention on March 14, 2010, where the game was first released, ten thousand copies were sold by noon.
