= Touhou Project =

Bullet hell video game series

- Genres: Bullet hell, fighting, (Note: Seven of the spin-offs are fighting games, which were created in collaboration with doujin developer Twilight Frontier.) block breaker (Note: Highly Responsive to Prayers only)
- Developers: Team Shanghai Alice; Twilight Frontier
- Publishers: Team Shanghai Alice; Alliance Arts (Note: New Classic: Embodiment of Scarlet Devil)
- Creator: ZUN
- Platforms: PC-98; Windows; PlayStation 4 (Note: Urban Legend in Limbo, Antinomy of Common Flowers); Nintendo Switch (Note: Antinomy of Common Flowers, Sunken Fossil World, New Classic: Embodiment of Scarlet Devil); PlayStation 5; Nintendo Switch 2
- First release: Highly Responsive to Prayers; August 15, 1997 (C52)
- Latest release: New Classic: Embodiment of Scarlet Devil; September 10, 2026

Touhou Project (Japanese: 東方Project), (Note: Japanese pronunciation: [to̞ːho̞ː]; sometimes written as 東方プロジェクト (Hepburn: Tōhō Purojekuto)) also known as Touhou, is a bullet hell video game series created by Japanese indie developer Jun'ya "ZUN" Ōta. As the sole member of doujin circle Team Shanghai Alice, ZUN has created twenty mainline games, thirteen spin-offs, and one remake since 1997. ZUN has also produced related original music and print media.

ZUN debuted the series at Comiket in 1997 with two games (Note: Highly Responsive to Prayers and Story of Eastern Wonderland) developed for the Japanese PC-98 system. After three more releases and a hiatus, he relaunched the series for Windows with Embodiment of Scarlet Devil in 2002. Mountain of Faith, released in 2007, marked a soft reboot with a new game engine. ZUN continued developing games over the following decade and started distributing titles on Steam in 2017. In 2026, he began directing Shanghai Alice Reprise, a project to remake earlier games.

While each bullet hell game has its own mechanics, they share common elements such as a vertically scrolling screen, a small player hitbox, projectiles and bombs, and boss fights. The series is set in Gensokyo, a fantasy land inhabited by humans and creatures from real-world folklore—including yōkai, fairies, gods, and spirits—who are personified as women in a moe style. Supernatural incidents occurring in Gensokyo are resolved by shrine maiden Reimu Hakurei and magician Marisa Kirisame, with battles being narratively non-fatal and following customary spell card rules.

Touhou Project has achieved widespread popularity in Japan and garnered a large international fandom. It has spawned an extensive body of doujin fan works, including fan-made video games, artworks, music, and literature, which are frequently sold at conventions like Comiket and Reitaisai. The popularity of the series has been attributed in part to the few restrictions placed by ZUN on the use of his content. The series has also influenced other video game developers and manga artists.

== Games ==
Release timeline Twilight Frontier collaborations marked with an asterisk (*)
1997	01. Highly Responsive to Prayers
1997	02. Story of Eastern Wonderland
1997	03. Phantasmagoria of Dim. Dream
1998	04. Lotus Land Story
1998	05. Mystic Square
1999
2000
2001
2002	06. Embodiment of Scarlet Devil
2003	07. Perfect Cherry Blossom
2004	08. Imperishable Night
2004	07.5. Immaterial and Missing Power*
2005	09. Phantasmagoria of Flower View
2005	09.5. Shoot the Bullet
2006
2007	10. Mountain of Faith
2008	10.5. Scarlet Weather Rhapsody*
2008	11. Subterranean Animism
2009	12. Undefined Fantastic Object
2009	12.3. Touhou Hisoutensoku*
2010	12.5. Double Spoiler
2010	12.8. Great Fairy Wars
2011	13. Ten Desires
2012
2013	13.5 Hopeless Masquerade*
2013	14. Double Dealing Character
2014	14.3. Impossible Spell Card
2015	14.5. Urban Legend in Limbo*
2015	15. Legacy of Lunatic Kingdom
2016
2017	16. Hidden Star in Four Seasons
2017	15.5. Antinomy of Common Flowers*
2018	16.5. Violet Detector
2019	17. Wily Beast and Weakest Creature
2020
2021	18. Unconnected Marketeers
2021	17.5. Sunken Fossil World*
2022	18.5. 100th Black Market
2023	19. Unfinished Dream of All Living Ghost
2024
2025	20. Fossilized Wonders
2026	06NC. New Classic: Embodiment of Scarlet Devil

Touhou Project is a doujin video game series created by independent Japanese developer Jun'ya Ōta, known as ZUN. The twenty mainline games are bullet hells—a subgenre of shoot 'em ups with large amounts of projectiles, called danmaku—with the exception of the debut block breaker title Highly Responsive to Prayers (1997). Official spin-offs include seven fighting games developed in collaboration with Twilight Frontier and six minor bullet hell games. One remake of a mainline game has been released.

The Touhou Project community commonly divides the series into the PC-98 and Windows eras, the latter of which is further divided into multiple generations. The first Windows generation includes games between Embodiment of Scarlet Devil (2002) and Shoot the Bullet (2005), while the second Windows generation includes games after Mountain of Faith (2007). Some classifications define a third Windows generation from Double Dealing Character (2013) onwards.

=== PC-98 games ===
Cover art for the first five Touhou Project games

As a Tokyo Denki University student, ZUN developed the first five Touhou Project games for the PC-98 system, using its six-channel FM synthesis for sound. The games were published by Amusement Makers, a student game development club which he directed. Originally interested in composing music for fighting games, he created his own games to publish his soundtracks more effectively.

ZUN began developing Highly Responsive to Prayers as a programming exercise in 1995 and showcased it at the Hatoyama Cultural Festival the next year. The game follows the shrine maiden Reimu Hakurei, who clears tiles with a yin-yang orb while dodging projectiles. One of ZUN's seniors suggested that he distribute the game at the biannual doujin convention Comiket; while he prepared for the event, he developed Story of Eastern Wonderland, a shoot 'em up that he had wanted to create after not being fully satisfied with his first game. It introduced complex projectile patterns that became a series staple.

ZUN published the two games at Comiket 52 in August 1997, selling 30 copies of the first game and 50 of the second. Encouraged by their positive reception, he continued developing the series and released three more games over the next year. Phantasmagoria of Dim. Dream, released at Winter Comiket in December 1997, is a split-screen bullet hell game in which the player competes against a computer opponent to score points. Lotus Land Story followed at Comiket 54 in August 1998, and Mystic Square at Comiket 55 in December.

By the time ZUN released Mystic Square, he had gained repeat customers and had his game featured in the magazine Game Lab. However, the PC-98's declining popularity, performance issues for action games, and limited graphical and auditory capabilities contributed to the series remaining largely unknown overall. In total, ZUN sold around 1,000 copies of the PC-98 games.

=== Windows games ===
After graduating, ZUN joined Taito, where he expected to leave Touhou Project for professional work in the game industry. Although the job improved his game design skills, he grew increasingly stressed by his inability to create games that appealed to him. During a subsequent visit to Comiket, ZUN noticed strong sales of Windows games despite what he considered their inconsistent quality. He attributed this to a lack of developers for the platform and believed he could produce better games himself. In 2001, he formed the one-man doujin circle Team Shanghai Alice and relaunched Touhou Project for Windows.

==== 2002–2006: Windows relaunch ====
At Comiket 62 in 2002, ZUN released Embodiment of Scarlet Devil, the sixth game in the series. It substantially improved on the PC-98 games' graphics and audio, changed the setting, and established several core mechanics, including the spell card system, where the boss enemy performs special attacks in phases. The player chooses between Reimu Hakurei and Marisa Kirisame, each of whom has two shot types. Perfect Cherry Blossom, released at Comiket 64 in 2003, introduced a visible player hitbox and a boss position indicator. Imperishable Night, released at Comiket 66 in 2004, offered four selectable character pairs and unlockable playthroughs for each character. Together, these games are sometimes grouped into a trilogy.

In 2004, ZUN published the spin-off fighting game Immaterial and Missing Power, numbered 7.5 in the series's in-universe chronology, in collaboration with doujin studio Twilight Frontier. At Summer Comiket in 2005, ZUN released the ninth game Phantasmagoria of Flower View, a battling bullet hell game similar to Phantasmagoria of Dim. Dream in which the player competes against a computer opponent through a stage and launches their own spell cards. The spin-off Shoot the Bullet, numbered 9.5, followed at that year's Winter Comiket. It is a bullet hell game in which the playable character captures photographs of danmaku attacks as the journalist Aya Shameimaru.

==== 2007–2013: Engine overhaul ====
In 2007, ZUN left Taito to focus on Touhou Project development full-time. Although he considered making a living from the series risky, his growing workload at Taito made him feel that he had to choose between his job and his independent work. He released Mountain of Faith, the tenth game, at Comiket 72 that year. The entry marked a soft reboot for the series, with a total overhaul of the game engine that resulted in substantial design and pacing changes.

In 2008, ZUN and Twilight Frontier published the 10.5th game Scarlet Weather Rhapsody, the successor to Immaterial and Missing Power with a new move-deck system. The eleventh game, Subterranean Animism, followed at the Summer Comiket, featuring three selectable character pairs with distinct mechanics. Undefined Fantastic Object, the twelfth entry, was released at Summer Comiket in 2009. It reintroduced player spell cards as a separate mechanic and uses a UFO system that grants gameplay benefits.

ZUN released three spin-offs in 2009 and 2010: the fighting game Touhou Hisoutensoku (12.3), developed with Twilight Frontier; the bullet hell game Double Spoiler (12.5), a sequel to Shoot the Bullet featuring Hatate Himekaidou as a playable character; and Great Fairy Wars (12.8), a spin-off of the Touhou Sangetsusei manga in which Cirno battles other fairies with freezing attacks. The thirteenth game, Ten Desires, followed at Summer Comiket in 2011; it introduces a trance mechanic, activated by a spirit gauge, that grants the player temporary invincibility. In 2013, ZUN released the 13.5th entry, fighting game Hopeless Masquerade, at Reitaisai, an official Touhou Project convention; it features a new engine and aerial combat system.

==== 2013–present: Digital releases and expansion ====
At Summer Comiket in 2013, ZUN released the fourteenth game Double Dealing Character, which doubled the screen resolution. Playism began distributing it digitally outside Japan in 2015, marking the series' first official overseas release. In the 14.3rd game Impossible Spell Card, released at the 2014 Reitaisai, Seija Kijin faces especially difficult danmaku patterns that are cleared through advantageous items. In 2015, ZUN and Twilight Frontier released Urban Legend in Limbo, the 14.5th installment and a fighting game, which was ported to the PlayStation 4 a year later. The fifteenth game Legacy of Lunatic Kingdom, released at Summer Comiket in 2015, has a Pointdevice Mode, which lets players retry from checkpoints after being hit.

In 2017, ZUN began releasing new games digitally on Steam alongside Comiket sales with the sixteenth game Hidden Star in Four Seasons, which uses gameplay mechanics based on a selected season. He has since distributed older games digitally as well. The fighting game Antinomy of Common Flowers, the 15.5th entry, was released at Winter Comiket later that year and was ported to the PlayStation 4 and Nintendo Switch by Phoenixx Games in 2021, with the port incorporating a fan-made English translation. The 16.5th game Violet Detector, released in 2018, follows Sumireko Usami as she uses psychic powers and photography to escape nightmares. Wily Beast and Weakest Creature, released at Comiket in 2019, incorporates an animal spirit system similar to Undefined Fantastic Object.

The eighteenth game Unconnected Marketeers was first released digitally in 2021, incorporating a system of fictional currency to buy in-game cards. The 17.5th game Sunken Fossil World, developed with Twilight Frontier as a fighting game and boss rush, was released at Reitaisai the same year and ported to the Switch by Phoenixx. The 18.5th installment, 100th Black Market, released in commemoration of Comiket 100 in 2022, expands on the mechanics of Unconnected Marketeers in self-contained stages. The nineteenth game, Unfinished Dream of All Living Ghost, was released in 2023 at Summer Comiket with gameplay similar to previous battling bullet hell games. Fossilized Wonders was released in 2025, featuring different stones that affect the player's shot type.

In 2026, Shanghai Alice Reprise, a new team led by ZUN and senior developers to remake early Touhou Project titles, launched New Classic: Embodiment of Scarlet Devil. Published by Alliance Arts, it marked the first time any Touhou Project title has been officially localized outside Japan, with translations into eleven other languages. It was also the first game released for the PlayStation 5 and Nintendo Switch 2.

== Gameplay ==
The in-game interface of Perfect Cherry Blossom: 1. Player character; 2. High score and current score; 3. Player life and bomb counters; 4. Firepower gauge and graze counter; 5. Enemy spellcard gauge; 6. Special item counter; 7. Enemy spellcard name; 8. Enemy location indicator

Touhou Project games are shoot 'em ups (Note: With the exception of the first installment in the series, Highly Responsive to Prayers, an Arkanoid-style block breaker game.) in which the player defeats enemies in vertically scrolling levels while dodging their bullets. The player's bullet power increases as they collect power-ups dropped by enemies, eventually reaching its maximum. Each stage features at least one boss, whose attacks include spell cards, patterns of movements and shots that the player must overcome to clear the level.

Other collectibles include point icons, which increase the player's score; life items and bomb items, which give extra lives and bombs; and life pieces (Note: From Subterranean Animism onwards.) and bomb pieces, (Note: From Undefined Fantastic Object onwards.) which accumulate towards additional lives and bombs. Bombs grant temporary invulnerability, clear the screen of bullets, and deal heavy damage to all enemies. They can be used immediately after the player is hit to avoid losing a life.

The player hitbox (central circle) and ornamental effect displayed when focus mode is activated. (Note: Shown in Perfect Cherry Blossom; later titles vary in their visuals.)

Players can activate focus mode by holding down a key, which slows their movement, reveals their hitbox, and changes their attack type. Certain games include a graze counter, which tracks bullets that pass through the character sprite without colliding with its hitbox, rewarding the player with a bonus for each near-miss.

Touhou Project games have four difficulty levels: Easy, Normal, Hard, and Lunatic. Regardless of difficulty, games have six progressively harder stages, (Note: The exceptions to this are Story of Eastern Wonderland, which has only five stages, and Lotus Land Story and Embodiment of Scarlet Devil, both of which lock the player out of the sixth stage on easy difficulty.) followed by an extra stage usually unlocked by beating the game on Normal mode or above without continues, though the exact conditions vary by title. The extra stage is typically challenging.

Each game from Perfect Cherry Blossom onwards features a unique gameplay mechanic. For example, Perfect Cherry Blossom has cherry points, which primarily affect scoring but can also grant temporary invulnerability, while Imperishable Night has time points, which are essential for advancing to later stages and determine whether the player can challenge a boss's final spell card on certain difficulties.

== Plot ==
=== Background ===
The plots of Touhou Project revolve around strange phenomena occurring in the realm of Gensokyo. (Note: 幻想郷, Gensōkyō; [ɡẽ̞ɰ̃so̞ːkʲo̞ː]; lit. 'Land of Illusions' or 'Land of Fantasy') Long before the events of the series, humans and non-humans, including yōkai, coexisted in this area. As human civilization expanded, yōkai became concerned about its effects on the balance between the two groups. To address this, the yōkai sage Yukari Yakumo created a boundary to isolate Gensokyo from the outside world and attract its weakened yōkai. As a result, Gensokyo developed a secluded civilization with few humans and numerous supernatural beings.

In present-day Gensokyo, the setting of all games since Embodiment of Scarlet Devil, magical and spiritual qualities are commonplace, unlike in the outside world. The only known gateway between the two worlds is the Hakurei Shrine, located on Gensokyo's border. The Great Hakurei Barrier, maintained by past Hakurei miko, is described as impassable even to yōkai. To further preserve Gensokyo's balance, Reimu Hakurei, the current miko of the shrine, established spell card rules to regulate how fights are conducted.

=== In-game events ===
Events known as incidents are central to Touhou Project stories. An incident is an event that affects Gensokyo and has an initially unknown cause. Most mainline games focus on large-scale incidents that the protagonists investigate and resolve, although some works such as Mountain of Faith and certain print media center on smaller events. Incidents frequently occur due to a yōkai's whim or curiosity.

=== Characters ===
Reimu Hakurei and Marisa Kirisame, the protagonist duo of the series, on the official Touhou magazine Strange Creators of Outer World Vol. 8 cover

Touhou Project is known for its almost entirely female roster of over 180 characters. Its main protagonist is the miko Reimu Hakurei, (Note: 博麗霊夢, Hakurei Reimu) who is joined by the magician Marisa Kirisame (Note: 霧雨魔理沙, Kirisame Marisa; [kʲiɾʲisa̠me̞]) from the second game onward. Other recurring playable characters include Sakuya Izayoi, a maid with the ability to stop time; Youmu Konpaku, a half-yūrei gardener and swordswoman; and Sanae Kochiya, a miko and arahitogami.

Characters who frequently appear in the print works include Yukari Yakumo, a yōkai involved with the founding of Gensokyo; Eirin Yagokoro, a Lunarian pharmacist; and Aya Shameimaru, a tengu journalist with the ability to manipulate wind.

== Other media ==
=== Music CDs ===
ZUN has released physical CD albums of soundtracks, remixes, and original songs. ZUN's Music Collection consists of eleven albums and two extended plays containing arrangements of music from the games alongside new compositions, usually accompanied by a booklet of vignettes. Beginning with the second album, the stories chronicle the occult activities of the Hifuu Club (Note: 秘封倶楽部, Hifū Kurabu; lit. 'Secret Sealing Club') at a university in futuristic Kyoto. The loose collection of stories follows physicist Renko Usami and psychologist Maribel Hearn as they research the boundaries of reality and discuss various paranormal topics, unaware of Gensokyo's existence.

Between 2006 and 2007, ZUN released volumes 1–5 of Akyu's Untouched Score, (Note: 幺樂団の歴史, Yōgakudan no Rekishi; lit. 'History of Yougakudan') a collection of remix albums of the PC-98 soundtracks. Original soundtracks for the seven fighting games developed in collaboration with Twilight Frontier have also been released, which are mainly scored by various doujin creators. Since 2021, the Windows bullet hell soundtracks have been available on subscription services. In addition, several music CDs have been included with copies of official print works.

=== Print media ===
Curiosities of Lotus Asia (東方香霖堂, Tōhō Kōrindō; lit. 'Fragrant Rain Temple')
Curiosities of Lotus Asia is a serial novel by written by ZUN with illustrations by Genji Asai and released in 26 installments. It began serialization in Biblos's Colorful Puregirl magazine in January 2004, and it moved to Magazine Elfics after Colorful Puregirl ceased publication in September 2004. Then, the series was moved to the website Elnavi after Magazine Elfics ceased publication in October 2005. Following the bankruptcy of Biblos in April 2006, the series was moved to ASCII Media Works's Dengeki Moeoh magazine and was serialized until October 2007. It was compiled into a book and released on September 30, 2010. The novel is told from the perspective of Rinnosuke Morichika, one of the few male characters depicted in the series and the proprietor of Kourindou (香霖堂), an antique store in Gensokyo. In September 2015, a new serial began in the official Touhou Project magazine Strange Creators of Outer World, with 10 chapters being published as of January 2024.
Touhou Sangetsusei (東方三月精; lit. 'Three Fairies')
Touhou Sangetsusei is a four-part manga series written by ZUN and illustrated by Nemu Matsukura and Makoto Hirasaka. It was published by Kadokawa Shoten and serialized in Comp Ace magazine. The story follows three fairies (Sunny Milk, Luna Child, and Star Sapphire) and documents their daily mischief and adventures in Gensokyo. The first entry, Eastern and Little Nature Deity, was illustrated by Nemu Matsukara, beginning in May 2005. Matsukara gave up the project for health reasons in May 2006, with Makoto Hirasaka taking over for the second entry, Strange and Bright Nature Deity, which was serialized until January 2009. The third entry, Oriental Sacred Place, ran from May 2009 to January 2012; the fourth entry, Visionary Fairies in Shrine, ran from January 2016 to September 2019. The tankōbon volumes of the manga, which each include a CD with new tracks by ZUN, were released on the following dates: Eastern and Little Nature Deity (2007-01-26), Strange and Bright Nature Deity (2008-01-26, 2009-02-18, and 2009-08-26), and Oriental Sacred Place (2010-03-20, 2011-03-26, 2012-03-26). The 12.8th video game in the series, Fairy Wars, is a spin-off of the manga series.

Bohemian Archive in Japanese Red (東方文花帖, Tōhō Bunkachō; lit. 'Word Flower Album')
Bohemian Archive in Japanese Red is the first official fanbook, written by ZUN and published by Ichijinsha on August 11, 2005. It consists of newspaper articles written from the perspective of Aya Shameimaru about events and locations in Gensokyo, interviews with characters, commentary on tracks from previous games and music albums, and an interview with ZUN. It also includes illustrations by various artists, a collection of eight doujinshi, and a new official comic, Extra of the Wind, illustrated by Haniwa. Each copy includes a CD containing a demo of Phantasmagoria of Flower View, three arrangements of the game's music by ZUN, and a wallpaper of the book's cover.
Seasonal Dream Vision (東方紫香花, Tōhō Shikōbana; lit. 'Incense of Violet Flowers')
Seasonal Dream Vision is a semi-official fanbook, published by Comic Toranoana on October 1, 2005. It is an anthology of 12 doujinshi by various artists and contains a short story, A Beautiful Flower Blooming Violet Every Sixty Years (六十年ぶりに紫に香る花), written by ZUN as a supplement to Phantasmagoria of Flower View. It also contains a CD with various fan-made music arrangements and one arrangement by ZUN.
Perfect Memento in Strict Sense (東方求聞史紀, Tōhō Gumonshiki; lit. 'Gumon Histories')
Perfect Memento in Strict Sense is the second official fanbook, published by Ichijinsha on December 27, 2006. It is illustrated by various artists and written by ZUN from the perspective of Gensokyo historian Hieda no Akyuu, primarily containing factual information about various yōkai, such as their "threat levels" and suggested countermeasures. A manga written by ZUN and illustrated by Aki★Eda (秋★枝) based on the book's premise, Memorizable Gensokyo (記憶する幻想郷 Kioku-suru Gensōkyō), was previously published in the December 2006 issue of Comic Rex magazine. Each copy includes a CD containing three original FM synthesis tracks by ZUN and a wallpaper of the book's cover.
Touhou Bougetsushou (東方儚月抄; lit. 'Ephemeral Moon Vignette')
Touhou Bougetsushou is a loose collection of works continuing the story of the 8th game in the series, Imperishable Night. It consists of a manga, a novel, and a series of yonkoma strips, serialized in three separate Ichijinsha magazines. The manga, Silent Sinner in Blue, was written by ZUN and illustrated by Aki★Eda and serialized in Comic Rex magazine between June 2007 and April 2009. It follows the attempts of residents of Gensokyo to invade the Lunar Capital by rocket. The first compilation volume, which included a CD with three FM synthesis tracks by ZUN, was released on April 9, 2008. The novel, Cage in Lunatic Runagate, was written by ZUN and serialized in quarterly Chara-Mel magazine between June 2007 and June 2009 and published as a standalone on December 25, 2009. It was illustrated by Tokiame, and offers detailed information and character insight regarding the events of Silent Sinner in Blue. The yonkoma, Inaba of the Moon and Inaba of the Earth (月のイナバと地上の因幡, Tsuki no Inaba to Chijō no Inaba), was serialized in Manga 4-koma Kings Palette between June 2007 and December 2012. It was written and illustrated by Arata Toshihira, and serves as a light-hearted discursion from the main story featuring Reisen Udongein Inaba and Tewi Inaba, who are referenced respectively in the work's title.
The Grimoire of Marisa (グリモワール オブ マリサ, Gurimowāru obu Marisa)
Grimoire of Marisa is the third official fanbook, published by Ichijinsha on July 28, 2009. It is presented in the form of a scrapbook owned by Marisa Kirisame, recording her encounters with noteworthy Spell Cards. It is written by ZUN and illustrated by Takeshi Moriki, with a cover illustration by Genji Asai. It includes a CD with music by ZUN and several wallpapers.
Wild and Horned Hermit (東方茨歌仙, Tōhō Ibarakasen; lit. 'Rose Poem Hermit')
Wild and Horned Hermit is a manga series written by ZUN and illustrated by Aya Azuma, serialized from July 2010 to June 2019 in Ichijinsha's Chara Mel Febri (later Febri) magazine. It introduces protagonist Kasen Ibaraki, a mysterious hermit who descends from the mountains of Gensokyo in order to dispense knowledge to its residents.
Symposium of Post-mysticism (東方求聞口授, Tōhō Gumon Kuju; lit. 'Gumon Oral Teachings')
Symposium of Post-mysticism is the fourth official fanbook, published by Ichijinsha on April 27, 2012. It was written by ZUN and illustrated by various artists, and presented in the form of a dialogue hosted by Marisa Kirisame and featuring Kanako Yasaka, Byakuren Hijiri, and Toyosatomimi no Miko. It features profiles of almost every character from Mountain of Faith to Ten Desires as well as a collection of in-universe newspaper articles from the Bunbunmaru Newspaper and Kakashi Spirit News.
Forbidden Scrollery (東方鈴奈庵, Tōhō Suzunaan; lit. 'Bell Hermitage')
Forbidden Scrollery is a manga series written by ZUN and illustrated by Moe Harukawa, serialized between October 2012 and July 2017 in Comp Ace magazine. The story revolves around Kosuzu Motoori, a collector of various rare and dangerous demon books in Gensokyo and an employee of the Suzunaan book lender. It was licensed for an English-language release by Yen Press and released in seven volumes between November 2017 and May 2019, making it the first Touhou Project print work to be officially translated.
Strange Creators of Outer World (東方外來韋編, Tōhō Gairai Ihen; lit. 'Tomes of External Origins')
Strange Creators of Outer World is an official Touhou Project magazine, supervized by ZUN and published by Kadokawa under their Dengeki Moeoh imprint since September 2015. It features interviews with ZUN and other doujin creators, a continuation of the official novel Curiosities of Lotus Asia, and comics and CDs by various artists, among other related content.
Alternative Facts in Eastern Utopia (東方文果真報, Tōhō Bunka Shinpō; lit. 'Word's End True Report')
Alternative Facts in Eastern Utopia is the fifth official fanbook, published by Kadokawa on March 30, 2017. It was written by ZUN and contains illustrations from various artists. It is presented as Aya Shameimaru's attempt to create a tabloid magazine in the style of those from the outside world, featuring similar content to the earlier fanbook Bohemian Archive in Japanese Red, but in a significantly more chaotic and haphazard format.
The Grimoire of Usami (秘封倶楽部異界撮影記録, Hifū Kurabu Ikai Satsuei Kiroku; lit. 'Secret Sealing Club's Otherworld Photography Record')
The Grimoire of Usami is the sixth official fanbook, published by Kadokawa on April 27, 2019. It primarily features a manga written by ZUN and illustrated by Aya Azuma, with a cover illustration by Genji Asai. In an attempt to emulate the fireworks of the outside world, the residents of Gensokyo decide to hold a grand display of Spell Cards, which is interrupted partway through by a group of unexpected guests.
Foul Detective Satori (<東方智霊奇伝> 反則探偵さとり, <Tōhō Chireikiden> Hansoku Tantei Satori; lit. 'Strange Legend of Wise Spirits')
Foul Detective Satori is a two-part manga series written by ZUN and illustrated by Ginmokusei (銀木犀) and Yuu Akimaki (秋巻ゆう). The first part was illustrated by Ginmokusei and serialized from October 2019 on Kadokawa's ComicWalker website. Due to Ginmokusei's declining health, the series was halted on March 2021. A continuation began in October 2021 with Yuu Akimaki taking over as the artist. The story primarily focuses on the mind-reading yōkai Satori Komeiji, and her investigative mission to hunt down a vengeful spirit causing havoc in Gensokyo.
The Lotus Eaters, Drunk and Sober (東方酔蝶華 〜 ロータスイーター達の酔醒, Tōhō Suichōka ~ Rōtasuītā-tachi no Suisei; lit. 'Drunken Butterfly Flower ~ Drunkening and Sobering of Lotus-Eaters')
The Lotus Eaters, Drunk and Sober is a manga series written by ZUN and illustrated by Mizutaki (水炊き). It began serialization in Kadokawa Shoten's monthly Comp Ace magazine on November 26, 2019. The story follows Miyoi Okunoda, the poster girl of the Geidontei pub in the village, and her various interactions with humans and yōkai. The manga is published digitally in English on Kadokawa's BookWalker website.
Whispered Oracle of Hakurei Shrine (東方幻存神籤 ~ Whispered Oracle of Hakurei Shrine, Tōhō Genzōnmikuji; lit. 'Fantasy Fortune Telling')
Whispered Oracle of Hakurei Shrine is the seventh official fanbook, published by Kadokawa on April 1, 2025. It is written from the perspective of Reimu Hakurei, and features O-mikuji slips for every character that has appeared in the series so far (excluding the PC-98 era).

== Development ==
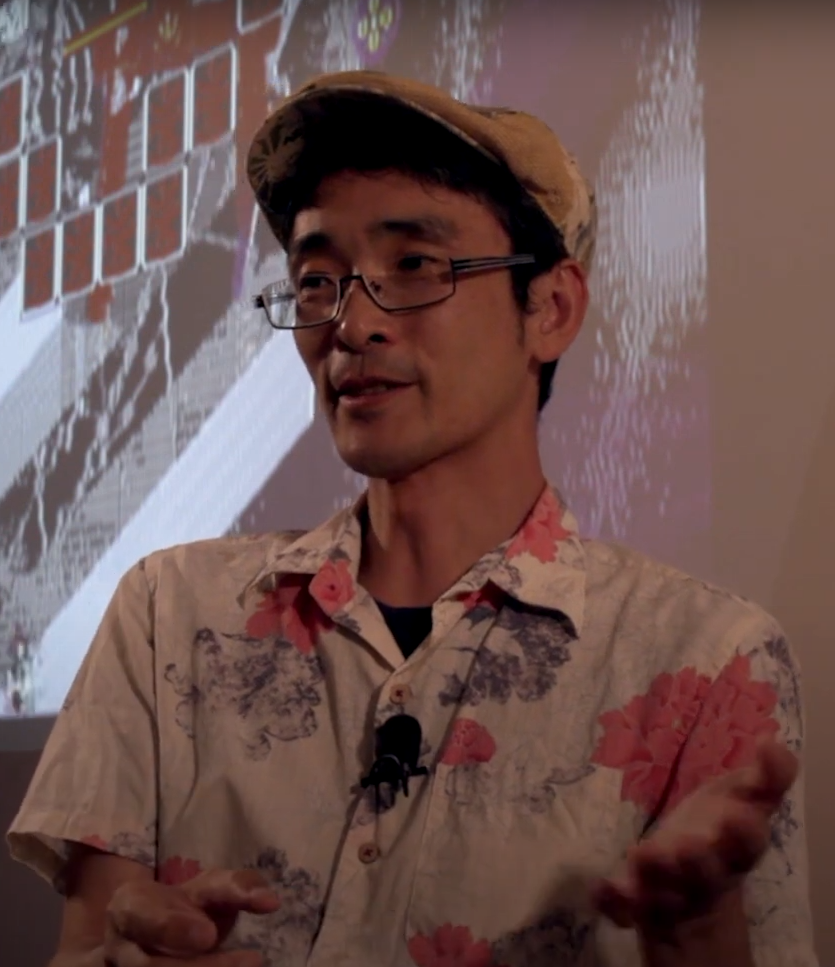
ZUN in 2016

=== Design and gameplay ===
When creating a game, ZUN typically begins by developing its world and setting, then its story and characters, and finally its graphics and music. This process usually takes him about four months. He has said that every element of a game should contribute to a cohesive experience, and that its different aspects should connect naturally. Despite the series's sequential numbering, ZUN does not consider its titles to be sequels that improve upon each other. He believes that as he gains experience, the style of his games will naturally change. Instead of aiming for advancements over time, he tries to develop the story of his series while giving his games a distinct and recognizable identity.

ZUN said that bullet hell (danmaku) games are intended to be aesthetically pleasing, which is why most Touhou Project characters are female; he felt that including too many male characters would change the intended style of his games. He also said that bullet patterns contribute to the feel of the game and can express characters' emotions. The spell card, a special sequence of attacks performed by boss enemies, is one of the series's characteristic mechanics. ZUN introduced spell cards to make characters stand out and become more interesting to players. He tries to design characters to fit the style of each level.

=== Graphics and music ===
Touhou Project uses a vertically scrolling screen; ZUN explained he chose this format because he wanted to create a sense of confrontation between the player and their opponent. Although the gameplay is two-dimensional, he uses three-dimensional backgrounds, which he believes improve immersion. He learned to draw while developing his first few games, and his art style has changed significantly throughout the series. He creates visuals using Adobe Photoshop. During the development of Fossilized Wonders, ZUN incorporated AI-generated images; he explained that their use was related to the game's themes and expressed a generally negative stance on the issue.

ZUN's musical influences include the bands Himekami and Zuntata, as well as jazz. Although he enjoys video game music, he does not consider it a particular source of inspiration. He aims to match the music to each stage's atmosphere and characters, sometimes modifying one to fit the other, and tries to synchronize it with the events of each level. He believes that good music, particularly later in the game, can strongly motivate players to survive so that they can continue listening to it.

=== Collaborations and expansion ===
ZUN prefers to work alone, explaining that he finds it easier to learn things himself than to rely on others. He has also emphasized his independence as a creator. While working at Taito, he refused an offer from them to release his games under their brand. He explained that as a doujin developer, he can create what he wants, even if this means earning less money. ZUN's sole collaborations are with Twilight Frontier, a team with whom he has created seven fighting game spin-offs. Twilight Frontier approached him following Perfect Cherry Blossom's release to ask for permission to create a fan game. Since he was interested in making a fighting game but could not develop one alone, he worked with them, an experience he enjoyed.

For many years, ZUN was reluctant to release his games digitally, as he was worried that they would not be well received by overseas audiences. However, after seeing international visitors purchase his games, he began to reconsider. He has expressed being "very grateful" for fan translations that helped spread Touhou Project beyond Japan; when he first released his games on Steam in 2017, he said that those translations would allow the games, which were released entirely in Japanese, to be accessible. He has not made any predictions about when he will retire, saying that he will simply continue making games whenever he feels like it.

== Reception ==
=== Popularity ===
Touhou Project has achieved widespread popularity in Japan, with PC Gamer describing the series as "perhaps the biggest indie success" there. In particular, it is known for the dedication of its fans, who have produced numerous derivative works based on the series. In the West, Touhou Project has been less well-known because it did not receive an official English translation for 20 years; despite its lack of mainstream recognition, Sylvia Jones of Anime News Network opined that it has been "one of the most important pillars for modern anime/manga fandom".

Though Touhou Project is not traditionally commercially distributed, it has still gained a wide reach; according to Takumi Ikeda, a researcher from Tokyo Metropolitan University, the market for Touhou Project derivative works was estimated at 2 billion Japanese yen in 2011 (US$25,000,000 in 2026). GameMeca, writing shortly after the release of Subterranean Animism, stated that Touhou Project had surpassed many commercial games in popularity.

=== Critical reception ===
Heidi Kemps of PC Gamer praised Touhou Project's gameplay, describing each installment as "tremendously fun" with a "distinct personality". Sébastien Wesolowski of Vice.com opined that the series was most renowned for the intensity of its playing experience, which he commended for its simplicity and excitement; he compared it to a flow state, though he noted that setbacks could be frustrating at times. Jones called the gameplay "very satisfying to learn and master", with well-designed bullet patterns.

Touhou Project's music has been well received by several critics. A reviewer from 4Gamer.net praised its background music, and Mitsuki of Eplus Spice described it as an especially memorable element of the series. Ant Cooke of Anime News Network said that the series was "known for fantastic soundtracks that fans will remix forever", while Jones characterized ZUN as a "talented composer".

Its visual elements have also garnered warm comments, with Kemps finding the visuals "extremely well done". Jones wrote that the "art, while not as technically refined, has plenty of charm", calling it a mark of ZUN's "doujin spirit". Wesolowski spoke positively of the 2D nature of the graphics, stating that Touhou Project was beautiful as it was and did not need changes.

The characters and worldbuilding have been met with favorable reactions. Jeong Yo-han of GameMeca highlighted how the game adds new and distinct characters with every installment, allowing fans to form their own interpretations of the story. Mitsuki praised Touhou Project's character designs and setting, particularly its older Japanese backdrop, while Kemps called the series's lore and characters a "massive draw" for fans.

=== Accolades ===
Touhou Project was nominated in the Entertainment category of the 11th annual Media Arts Awards, held by Japan's Agency for Cultural Affairs in 2007, where it eventually lost to Nintendo's Wii Sports for the Grand Prize. The series was inducted into the Guinness World Records in October 2010 as the "most prolific fan-made shooter series". In 2026, Fossilized Wonders, the 20th mainline game, was voted the second-best shooter game at the Dengeki Indie Game Awards.

== Fandom ==
Cosplay of characters from the series

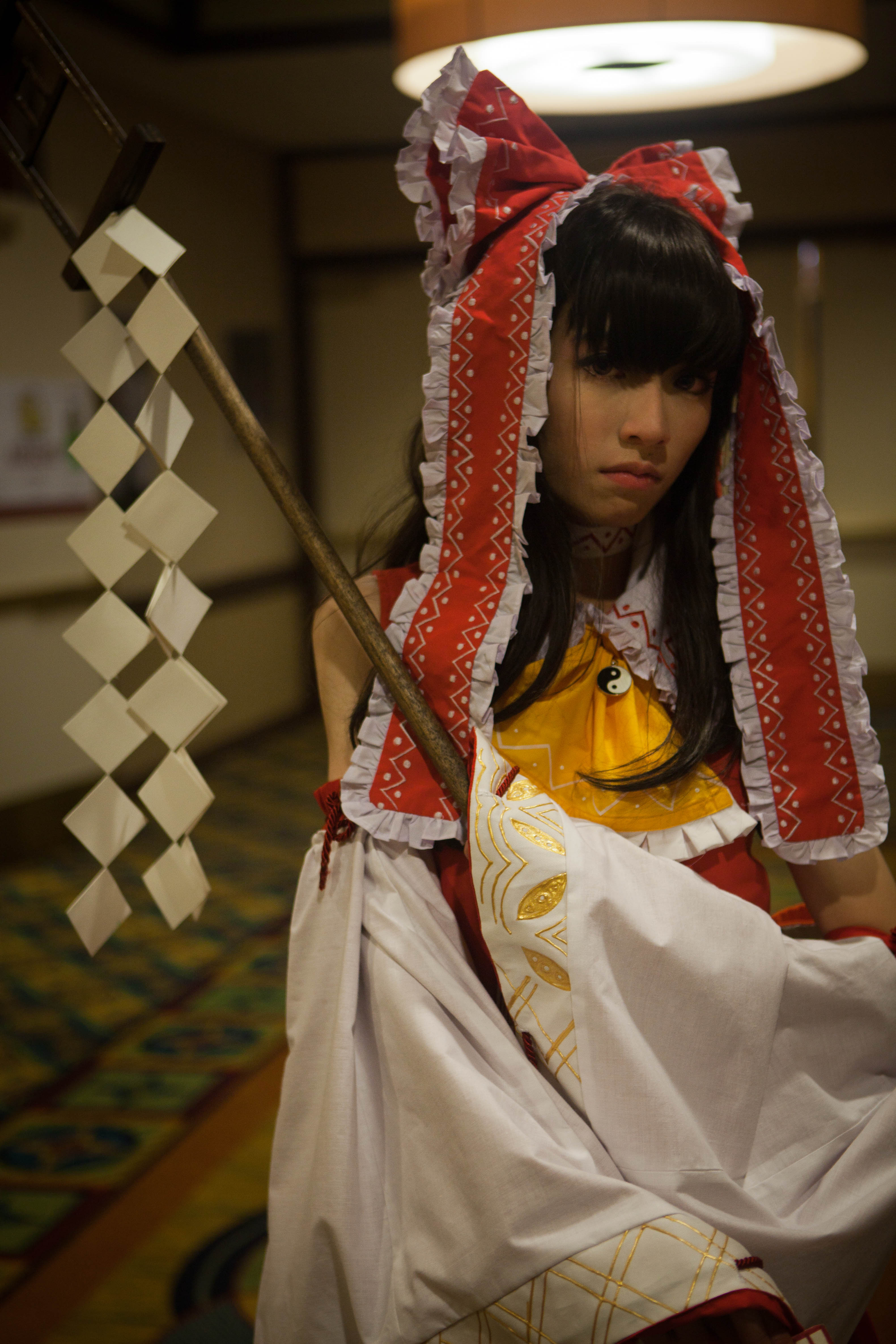
Reimu Hakurei

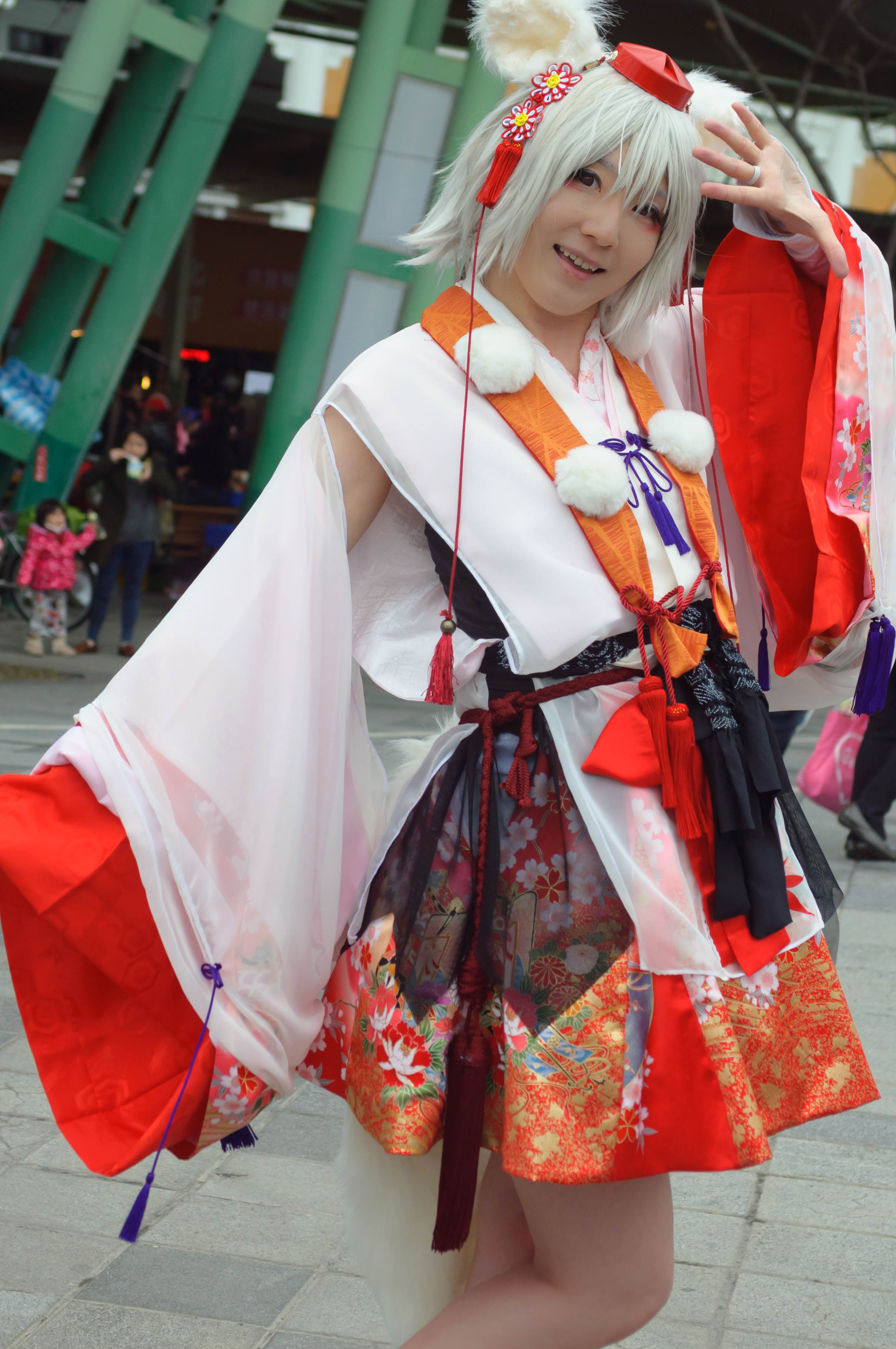
Momiji Inubashiri

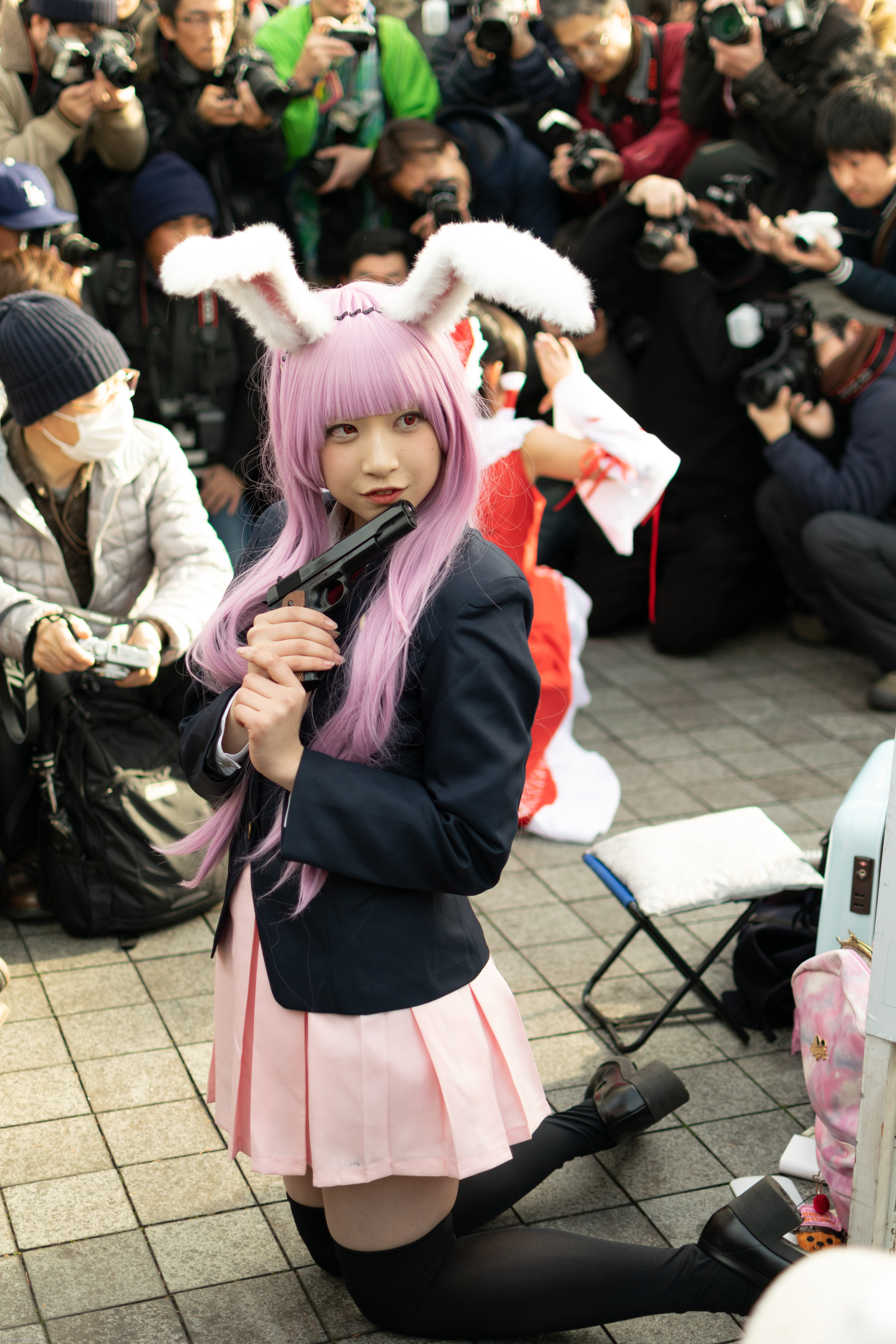
Reisen Udongein Inaba

=== Demography ===
Touhou Project has a large fandom. It grew rapidly throughout the late 2000s, reaching a peak around the early 2010s. From 2012 to 2019, its most popular dedicated convention drew over 50,000 attendees each year, and it continues to have an active fanbase nearly thirty years after its release.

A 2009 survey of Comiket participants found that the average age of fans was 24.8 years. A 2023 survey found that self-described devoted fans of the series had an 85:15 male-to-female ratio, while a community poll taken the same year found that nearly 40% of respondents were aged 15–19 and about 23% were aged 20–24. Several factors have been suggested as explanations for the continued influx of younger fans, including the series's popularity on YouTube and parents passing their interests on to their children.

=== Derivative works ===
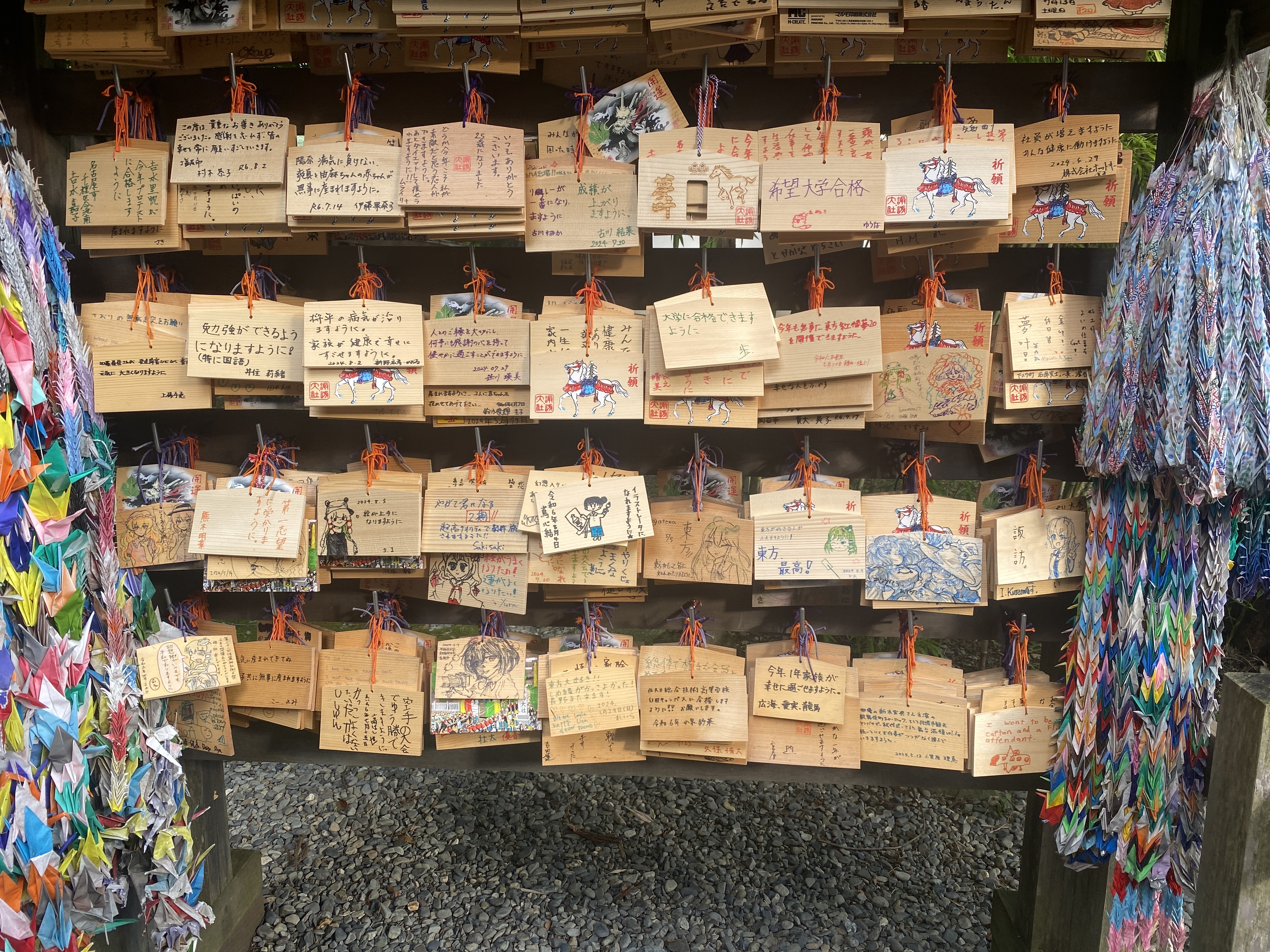
Prayer plaques with Touhou Project characters in Suwa-taisha. Akimiya Kaguraden in Suwa-taisha was used as the background image in Mountain of Faith.

Since the release of Embodiment of Scarlet Devil, fans have created numerous derivative works of Touhou Project, including doujinshi, doujin music, (Note: Many songs are remixes of the original games' music.) anime, and doujin games. The series' extensive body of derivative works has led it to be described as an indispensable part of Japanese consumer-generated media.

==== Doujin culture and conventions ====
Touhou Project has been characterized as an example of database consumption, with doujin works creating new interpretations of existing character attributes and settings. ZUN has generally encouraged fan creations by imposing minimal restrictions on the use of his works. His guidelines prohibit large-scale commercial distribution and ask creators not to crowdfund their projects. ZUN has stated that he does not want the series to be officially commercialized.

A graph comparing the participation of doujin circles at Comiket 85 (December 2013)

The first doujinshi based on Touhou Project appeared at Comiket 65 in December 2003, where seven circles sold derivative works. Touhou Project was the most popular fandom at Comiket from 2009 to 2013, reaching 2,272 circles in the latter year. The series' popularity declined slightly by the late 2010s; by 2019, it was the fourth-most popular series at Comiket. Dedicated conventions known as Touhou-Only (Note: 東方オンリー) events are also held, with the largest including Reitaisai in Kanto and Kouroumu in Kansai; as of December 2016, they had been held in 36 of Japan's prefectures.

==== Fan-created media ====
Fan-made doujin games featuring Touhou Project characters or mechanics form a popular genre of derivative works, ranging from adaptations of other games to entirely original titles. ZUN's commercialization guidelines historically limited the availability of physical copies; that changed in 2014 when Sony and Mediascape, with ZUN's permission, included Touhou Project in their "Play, Doujin!" initiative to allow fan-made games to be ported to other platforms.

Several fan-made anime have also been produced, such as Fantasy Kaleidoscope ~ The Memories of Phantasm (Note: 幻想万華鏡) by Manpuku Jinja and A Summer Day's Dream (Note: 夢想夏郷) by Maikaze. Although generally created by amateur studios, the projects have sometimes featured professional voice actors. In 2010, the professional anime studio Ufotable produced Anime Tenchou x Touhou Project. (Note: アニメ店長 x 東方Project)

Touhou Project music has been a particular inspiration for derivative works, with arrangement CDs regularly sold at conventions. The doujin music circle IOSYS has produced popular Flash music videos, including "Marisa Stole the Precious Thing", which have been widely referenced online on platforms such as Niconico. In 2020, an initiative to make fanmade music arrangements (alongside the original songs) available on digital streaming platforms included over 17,000 songs.

== Legacy ==
=== Influence on creators ===
Touhou Project has had a significant impact on the development of bullet hell games; in particular, its visual focus on attack patterns rather than on the player and their opponents distinguished it from earlier shoot 'em up games, and it is considered representative of the bullet hell genre today. The style of Touhou Project's gameplay has also become a distinct genre in the Japanese doujin video game community, influencing many of the games produced within it.

Touhou Project has also inspired other video game developers, both in and outside Japan. Toby Fox, the creator of Undertale and Deltarune, mentioned that the series could be described as the "sole reason" that his two games have their respective battle systems. He cited Touhou Project's soundtrack as one of his musical influences. Yoshiro Kimura, developer of the side-scrolling shooter Black Bird, said that Touhou Project inspired several of his game's mechanics, particularly its hit detection system.

Touhou Project's association with doujinshi has inspired artists. Nio Nakatani, author of Bloom into You, was initially known for drawing doujinshi of the series; she mentioned that its mostly female cast contributed to her reputation as an author of yuri manga. Yoshitaka Ushiki, author of Dream Eater Merry, similarly began his career drawing doujin manga for Touhou Project. Chomoran, a manga artist who illustrated an adaptation of Zaregoto among other series, stated that Touhou Project's worldbuilding inspired his decision to begin drawing manga.

=== Cultural impact ===
Touhou Project has become a prominent part of Japanese internet culture. It has been particularly popular on Niconico, a video-sharing website that was among the most widely used in Japan in the late 2000s. It contributed to the website's rapid growth and was named as one of three fandoms that frequently dominated its content prior to a new categorization system. By 2014, Touhou Project videos—including song arrangements, theater, gameplay footage, and MikuMikuDance recordings—had reached a combined 2.42 billion views on the website. In the same year, Touhou Project had the second-highest number of tagged works on the artist community Pixiv, behind only original drawings, with over 1.62 million illustrations from 114,000 users.

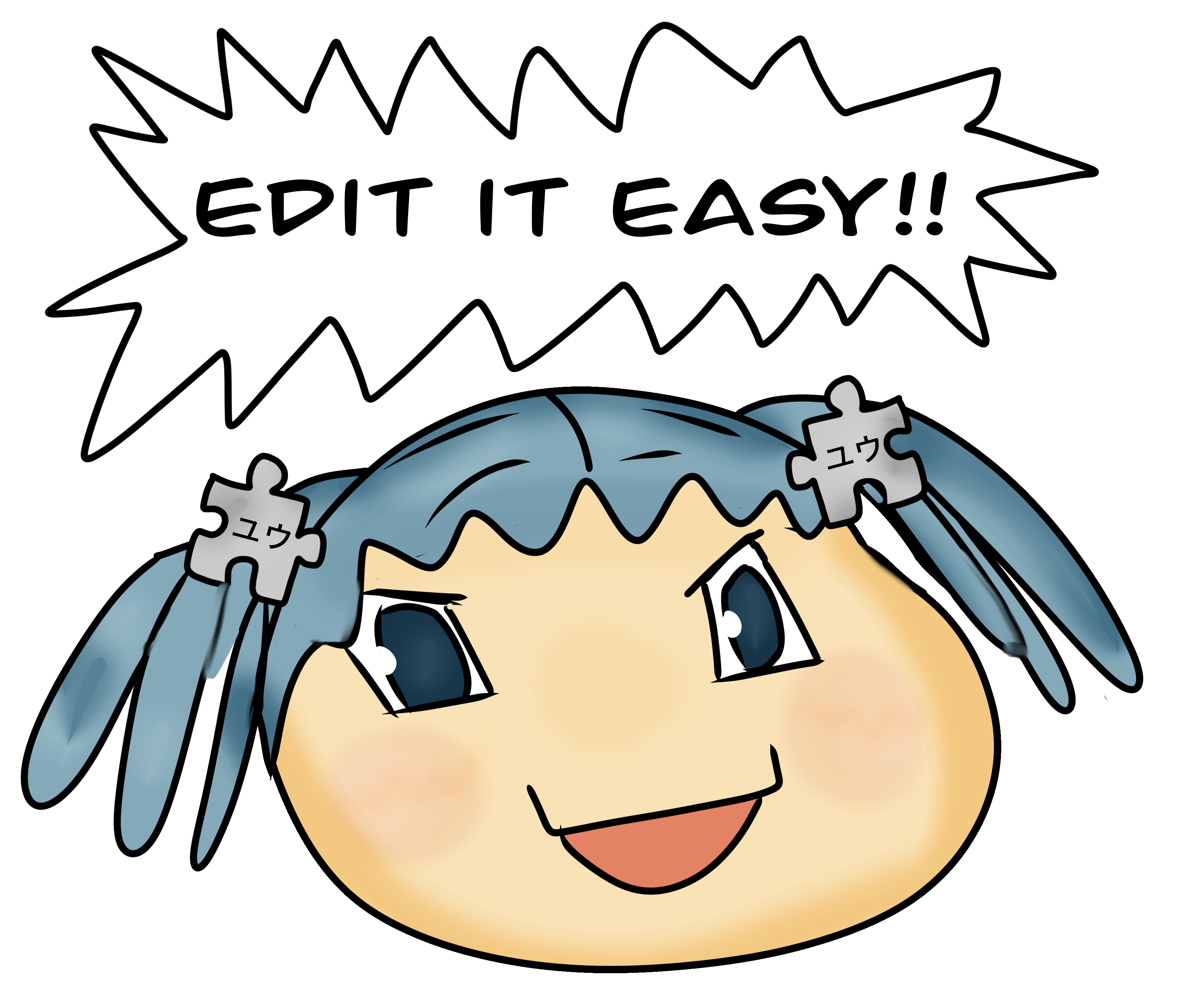
Wikipe-tan drawn in the yukkuri style

Some Touhou Project derivative works have also achieved recognition of their own. A shadow play music video accompanying the arrangement "Bad Apple!!" by Alstroemeria Records has become known for attempts to recreate it on various platforms, particularly unusual ones. (Note: Among them are Excel, graphing calculators, and Rubik's Cubes.) Yukkuri, deformed depictions of Touhou Project protagonists Reimu and Marisa that originated from 2007 Shift JIS art with the phrase "Yukkuri shite itte ne!!!", (Note: ゆっくりしていってね!!!; often translated as "You should be taking it easy!!!") became a Japanese internet meme, placing third in the 2008 Internet Buzzword Awards. Videos pairing Yukkuri graphics with voice synthesis software are a ubiquitous genre of explanatory videos, with over 5300 channels on YouTube as of 2022.
