= Ten Desires =

2011 video game

- Original CD-ROM with a silhouette of Toyosatomimi no Miko.
- Developer: Team Shanghai Alice
- Publisher: Team Shanghai Alice
- Composer: Team Shanghai Alice
- Series: Touhou Project
- Platform: Windows
- Release: JP: 13 August 2011 (Note: Ten Desires was sold on the second day of Comiket 80.)
- Genre: Bullet hell
- Mode: Single-player

Touhou Shinreibyou ~ Ten Desires. (Japanese: 東方神霊廟 ～ Ten Desires.; lit. "Eastern Divine Spirit Temple") is a bullet hell shooter released in 2011 for Windows. It is the thirteenth main game of the Touhou Project dōjin series made by Team Shanghai Alice.

== Gameplay ==
Reimu fighting the Stage 1 boss, Yuyuko. Various divine spirits are onscreen.

Ten Desires retains the same core gameplay mechanics of the rest of the Touhou games, in which the player will traverse through six increasingly difficult stages, in which they have to kill enemies, dodge their projectiles, and fight bosses, halfway through, and at the end of each stage.

Introduced in Ten Desires is the 'divine spirits' feature. When enemies are killed, they will drop spirits, which float towards the top of the screen. They are not automatically collected, even if the player is above the Point of Collection, and each one must be collected manually, except during boss battles, wherein all divine spirits will automatically be collected by the player once they complete a spell card. Gray spirits will give the player extra points, green spirits will give them extra spell cards, and purple spirits will give them extra lives. Similar to the system in Undefined Fantastic Object, the player can fill a 'Trance' gauge by collecting blue and gray spirits. When three of either have been collected, the player can activate a trance, which lasts for ten seconds, and will give them increased shot power, immunity to damage, and increased points from collecting spirits. If the player is hit in this game, unlike previous games, trance mode will automatically activate, and the time will depend on how much of the trance gauge is filled, after which point they will lose a life.

== Plot ==
Large amounts of spirits begin to appear throughout Gensokyo, and the player character goes out and investigates.

The player character enters the Netherworld, where spirits often go. While investigating, the heroine encounters Yuyuko Saigyouji. Yuyuko, who is unaware of the situation, points them to the Myouren Temple, where they find Kyouko Kasodani, the temple's cleaner. Afterwards, they meet Kogasa Tatara, who asks the player character to defeat a girl who's guarding the place. Instead, the player character attacks Kogasa and continues on. Eventually, they meet Yoshika Miyako, the Jiangshi protecting the mausoleum. Yoshika is defeated and opens the door to the mausoleum.

Inside, there are way more divine spirits than there were before. The player character tries to proceed, but encounters Seiga Kaku, who has resurrected Yoshika and used her as a guard of the mausoleum. After being defeated, Seiga states that the temple was built in order to prevent someone from being resurrected. As the player character advances, they find Soga no Tojiko, who is quickly defeated. Eventually, the player character encounters Mononobe no Futo. After being defeated, Mononobe realises that the 'Crown Prince' is being resurrected and quickly goes to see what is going on. The player character continues in the mausoleum and sees a ton of divine spirits and finds Toyosatomimi no Miko, a Saint who had just been resurrected. The divine spirits were gathering here to see the resurrection of a holy person, the holy person being Miko, whom the player character then defeats.

Afterwards, the player character investigates around the Myouren Temple and finds Nue Houjuu, who is angry that Miko was resurrected. Nue attacks the player character, but is defeated. The player character then meets Mamizou Futatsuiwa, who claimed that Nue sent her there.

== Characters ==
=== Player characters ===
- Reimu Hakurei (博霊霊夢)

Miko of the Hakurei Shrine. She investigates the divine spirits to prevent an incident from happening, and it would reflect badly on her shrine if she ignored it.

- Marisa Kirisame (霧雨魔理沙)

Human magician. She investigates the divine spirits due to her personal curiosity.

- Sanae Kochiya (東風谷早苗)

Miko of the Moriya Shrine. She collects the spirits as she thinks it will help increase the amount of faith in her shrine.

- Youmu Konpaku (魂魄妖夢)

Half-ghost, gardener and bodyguard of Yuyuko Saigyouji. She investigates the spirits to try to prevent the possibility of an incident.

=== Boss characters ===
- Yuyuko Saigyouji (西行寺 幽々子)

Stage 1 boss. The ghostly princess of the Netherworld. As she is a ghost and orchestrated the Spring Snow Incident in Perfect Cherry Blossom, the player character assumes she is responsible. In actuality, she has nothing to do with it and directs them to the source of the spirits, the Myouren Temple.

- Kyouko Kasodani (幽谷 響子)

Stage 2 boss. Kyouko Kasodani is a Yamabiko who, after finding that people stopped believing in her kind, began to recite Buddhist sutras, so she could continue to speak from the mountains when it appeared nobody was present.

- Tatara Kogasa (多々良 小傘)

Stage 3 midboss. A Kasa-obake who likes to wander around graveyards and scare people. She noticed that a yōkai was in the graveyard where she normally resided, and attacked it to try to get it to leave, but was unsuccessful. She attacks the player character to draw their attention and get them to defeat the yōkai she found.

- Yoshika Miyako (宮古 芳香)

Stage 3 and Stage 4 boss, alongside Seiga Kaku. Yoshika is a jiangshi who was revived by Seiga and guards the entrance to the Divine Spirit Mausoleum. Because she is a type of zombie, she does not feel pain, but cannot bend her joints or walk properly.

- Seiga Kaku (霍 青娥)

Stage 4 boss, alongside Yoshika Miyako. Seiga Kaku is a hermit whose father was also a hermit and dedicated himself to the Tao, and Seiga grew an interest in the Tao in response, in particular He Xiangu, and became an advocate of Taoism, suggesting to Miko that Taoism could be used to attain superhuman strength. Seiga guards the Divine Spirit Mausoleum from invaders and can use her powers to pass through walls. She is very strict with her employee, Yoshika.

- Soga no Tojiko (蘇我 屠自古)

Stage 5 midboss, one of Toyosatomimi no Miko's servants. Soga no Tojiko is a ghost who came from the powerful Soga clan. She served Miko alongside Futo, but she was denied resurrection as a human due to her previous connections with Futo and instead became a vengeful spirit who guards the Mausoleum. She has the ability to control thunder and lightning. She previously disliked Futo, but came to an agreement, and they both share a hatred of Buddhism.

- Mononobe no Futo (物部 布都)

Stage 5 boss, one of Toyosatomimi no Miko's servants. Mononobe no Futo is a human who came from the Mononobe clan, serving Miko alongside Soga no Tojiko. She has the power to control feng shui and summon a boat during some of her spell cards.

- Toyosatomimi no Miko (豊聡耳 神子)

Stage 6 boss. A saint living inside the Hall of Dreams' Mausoleum. Her intelligence was recognised from a young age, as she was able to listen to ten people speaking at the same time, by listening to their desires. After the events of Ten Desires, she and her followers moved to a world named Senkai (仙界, the hermit realm), which is said to be suited for hermits. She is based on Prince Shotoku.

- Nue Houjuu (封獣 ぬえ)

Extra stage midboss. After being defeated in Undefined Fantastic Object, she took refuge under the Myouren Temple. After hearing of Byakuren's resurrection, she thought Miko would be a threat to Byakuren and called for her friend Mamizou to help.

- Mamizou Hutatsuiwa (二ツ岩 マミゾウ; alternate spelling: Mamizou Futatsuiwa)

Extra stage boss. A tanuki yōkai who resides in the Myouren Temple. Usually, she likes to pull tricks on people and has an ability to change appearances, making her similar to Nue.

== Development ==
Due to the 2011 Tōhoku earthquake, the initial release of the demo was delayed. The demo was released for free download on April 16, 2011, with the physical copy being released on May 8, 2011, at Reitaisai 8, with all proceeds going to charity for disaster relief. The full version of the game was released at the 80th Comiket on August 13, 2011. The game was released on Steam on June 18, 2019.
