= Impossible Spell Card =

2014 video game

- Developer: Team Shanghai Alice
- Publisher: Team Shanghai Alice
- Designer: ZUN
- Series: Touhou Project
- Platform: Windows
- Release: Windows; May 11, 2014; Steam; April 1, 2019
- Genre: Scrolling shooter
- Mode: Single-player

Danmaku Amanojaku ~ Impossible Spell Card. (Japanese: 弾幕アマノジャク ～ Impossible Spell Card.) is a vertically scrolling shooter and the 14.3rd official game of the Touhou Project series. It was first released in the 11th Hakurei Shrine Reitaisai on May 11, 2014. It was released on Steam on April 1, 2019.

== Gameplay ==
The player controls Seija Kijin, the main character, to take down bosses and avoid the bullets. Due to the bullets being nearly too dense to avoid directly, the player must use a series of nine cheat items which belong to other characters of Touhou Project to finish the avoidance. All levels in Impossible Spell Card may be completed without the use of items, however.

== Gold Rush ==
Seija fighting Sekibanki. Impossible Spell Card features danmaku patterns that are impossible to avoid without the usage of items.

On November 16, 2014, ZUN released Danmaku Amanojaku ~ Gold Rush (弾幕アマノジャク ゴールドラッシュ), a single-stage mini game based on Impossible Spell Card where Seija Kijin uses a tenth cheat item that can turn bullets into money. It was made under 2 days specifically for the Digital Game Expo 2014's "Doujin Shooting Game Caravan" contest, where it was available to be played.
