= Subterranean Animism =

2008 bullet hell video game

- Original CD-ROM cover with a silhouette of Utsuho Reiuji
- Developer: Team Shanghai Alice
- Publisher: Team Shanghai Alice
- Composer: Team Shanghai Alice
- Series: Touhou Project
- Platform: Windows
- Release: JP: 16 August 2008 (Note: Subterranean Animism was sold on the second day of Comiket 72.)
- Genres: Bullet hell, scrolling shooter
- Mode: Single-player

Touhou Chireiden ~ Subterranean Animism (Japanese: 東方地霊殿 ～ Subterranean Animism; lit. "Eastern Palace of the Earth Spirits") is the eleventh main game of the Touhou Project bullet hell scrolling shooter video game series by Team Shanghai Alice. The game was released on August 16, 2008, during the 74th Comiket.

== Gameplay ==
Screenshot of Stage 2

Subterranean Animism is a vertically scrolling shoot 'em up game in which the player has to navigate through a total of six stages, while killing enemies and dodging their projectiles. Each stage contains two bosses, with large amounts of health and complex attack patterns called spell cards, that the player must defeat before advancing. The player can also use their own spell cards, which clear the screen of bullets and give temporary invulnerability, using the same system from Mountain of Faith wherein usage of a spell card will consume some of the player's shot power, which is replenished by picking up power-ups from killed enemies. However, unlike Mountain of Faith, the player spell cards in Subterranean Animism offer different properties depending on the player character.

The player gains points by killing enemies, collecting point items, capturing spell cards, and, of particular importance in Subterranean Animism, grazing bullets. The player will receive one extra life upon collecting 5 Life Pieces, one of which drops after each spell card beaten without losing a life.

ZUN has said that he believes Subterranean Animism is one of the more difficult Touhou games, suggesting that the game's Hard Mode is comparable to Lunatic in other installments, and that not all players should expect to clear the game on the higher difficulties.

== Plot ==
During Gensokyo's winter, a geyser erupts, close to the Hakurei Shrine, which caused various spirits from Hell to emerge. Patchouli Knowledge, who had previously read of a "power that was uncontrollable by the likes of the yōkai from above ground", warns Yukari Yakumo, who convinces Reimu to go underground and investigate.

The creation of the geyser was instigated by Kanako Yasaka, who convinced the Hell raven Utsuho Reiuji to consume Yatagarasu (a mythical crow and guiding god in Shinto mythology) and acquire the power of nuclear fusion. Kanako planned to use Hell as a source of nuclear energy, which raised the level of heat in Hell, causing the geyser eruption. Though the proliferation of nuclear energy would have given Gensokyo more energy, Reimu defeats Utsuho, and returns Gensokyo to its normal state. Utsuho explains that nuclear energy was desirable due to its ability to power hot springs at the right temperature.

== Characters ==
=== Playable characters ===
Subterranean Animism has two playable characters, Reimu and Marisa, each of whom can choose one of three partners, that will give special abilities.

- Reimu Hakurei (博麗 霊夢) – The miko of the Hakurei Shrine.
  - Yukari Yakumo (八雲 紫) – A yōkai who can control boundaries, and allows Reimu to teleport.
  - Suika Ibuki (伊吹 萃香) – An oni whose ability is to gather things, and allows Reimu to collect all onscreen items.
  - Aya Shameimaru (射命丸 文) – A tengu with exceptional speed, and allows Reimu to temporarily move quickly.
- Marisa Kirisame (霧雨 魔理沙) – A magician who lives in the Forest of Magic. Marisa is faster than Reimu, and can collect items more easily.
  - Alice Margatroid (アリス・マーガトロイド) – A magician puppeteer, who doubles the player's maximum shot power, from 4 to 8.
  - Patchouli Knowledge (パチュリー・ノーレッジ) – A magician of the elements, who allows Marisa to shoot from five different attack formations.
  - Nitori Kawashiro (河城 にとり) – A kappa who uses advanced technology, giving Marisa high-powered missiles. Nitori can deploy a temporary shield, which will clear the screen of bullets if the player is hit when it is active, and restore some of their shot power if they can last for its duration without getting hit.

=== Enemy characters ===
- Kisume (キスメ) – Stage 1 midboss, a tsurube-otoshi who attacks the heroines out of nowhere. She appears in a well bucket and it is assumed she rarely, if ever, leaves this.
- Yamame Kurodani (黒谷ヤマメ) – Stage 1 boss, a tsuchigumo who is able to inflict diseases on her target despite her cheerful personality
- Parsee Mizuhashi (水橋パルスィ) – Stage 2 boss, a green-eyed, jealousy-driven hashihime who tries to drive the heroines away from the ancient city.
- Yugi Hoshiguma (星熊 勇儀) – Stage 3 boss and friend of Suika, she is also an oni who leads the heroes to the Palace of the Earthly Spirits.
- Satori Komeiji (古明地 さとり) – Stage 4 boss and owner of the Palace of the Earthly Spirits, she is a satori who has the ability to read minds, making her hated and feared among all living creatures. She keeps many pets, as she is well liked by animals, who normally cannot be understood by others.
- Rin Kaenbyou (火焔猫 燐) – Midboss of stages 4 to 6 and boss of stage 5, she is a pet kasha of Satori who is left in charge of the Hell of Blazing Fires. She spends her time carting off corpses to keep the fire strong enough. Though her full name is Rin Kaenbyou, she is referred to by her nickname Orin (お燐) in the game.
- Utsuho Reiuji (霊烏路 空) – Stage 6 boss, a hell raven who was given the power of nuclear fusion via Yatagarasu. She attempts to revive Hell's down-scaled fire with her new powers.
- Sanae Kochiya (東風谷 早苗) – Extra stage midboss, the miko of the Moriya Shrine, where she is encountered.
- Koishi Komeiji (古明地 こいし) – Extra stage boss, she is Satori's sister but does not have the power of mind reading after she sealed off her third eye, sealing her heart to others in the process. By doing so, she became able to control the unconscious mind. She goes to the shrine to find the god that gave Utsuho her power.

Background characters:

- Suwako Moriya (洩矢 諏訪子) – Explains Kanako's motivations to the heroines after Koishi is beaten in the Extra stage.
- Kanako Yasaka (八坂 神奈子) – Set the plot of the game in motion by giving the power of nuclear fusion to Utsuho.

== Development ==
Subterranean Animism was released on August 16, 2008, at C74. The game was released on Steam on June 6, 2020, alongside Mountain of Faith and Undefined Fantastic Object.

== Reception ==
Game Rant considered Subterranean Animism to be the second best Touhou game, writing that it "takes intensity to a whole new level", and that it was not the most accessible game for beginners due to its difficulty.
