= Unconnected Marketeers =

2021 bullet hell video game

- Game cover with a silhouette of Chimata Tenkyuu
- Developer: Team Shanghai Alice
- Publisher: Team Shanghai Alice
- Series: Touhou Project
- Platform: Windows
- Release: May 4, 2021
- Genre: Scrolling shooter
- Mode: Single-player

Touhou Kōryūdō ~ Unconnected Marketeers (東方虹龍洞 〜 Unconnected Marketeers.; lit. "Eastern Rainbow Dragon Cave") is the 18th game in the Touhou Project series of danmaku shoot 'em ups. The game was first announced at Touhou Yomoyama News on February 27, 2021, and had a demo released on March 21. The game's full version released on May 4, 2021, on Steam.

== Gameplay ==
Mike, the Stage 1 boss

Unconnected Marketeers is a danmaku shoot 'em up game, in which the player moves along an automatically scrolling stage, killing enemies, dodging their projectiles, and fighting bosses at the end of each stage. The player's main method of attack is using a shot. The player can focus their shot, which will slow down the player, as well as their shot's rate of fire, but tighten the range of fire and increase its damage. The player is also given spell cards, which will clear bullets in their path, give the player invulnerability when active, and deal immense damage, but are limited in their supply. When enemies are killed, they will drop 'Power' items, which will increase the damage of the player's shot, and spell cards are also dropped, but only in specific areas, mostly after defeating bosses.

Unconnected Marketeers introduces a system of cards and currency. As well as power items, enemies may also drop currency, which can be used to purchase one card at the end of each stage. Some cards will give the player extra lives or spell cards, whereas most will improve the player's survivability in some way with special abilities, which are either applied passively, or need to be activated on command. Many of these abilities are based on those of characters from previous games.

Unconnected Marketeers continues with an achievement mechanic where specified goals (i.e., clearing “Lunatic” without dying) are given to optionally challenge the player to obtain which is granted after completing. However, it does not affect gameplay.

== Plot ==
The plot of the game involves magical cards that have appeared around Gensokyo, revealing the secrets of people and yokai. Reimu proceeds to investigate the origin of these cards, and attempt to contain them.

=== Characters ===
==== Playable characters ====
- Reimu Hakurei (博麗 霊夢) — Miko of the Hakurei Shrine
- Marisa Kirisame (霧雨 魔理沙) — A human magician from the Forest of Magic
- Sakuya Izayoi (十六夜 咲夜) — Maid of the Scarlet Devil Mansion
- Sanae Kochiya (東風谷 早苗) — Miko of the Moriya Shrine

==== Boss characters ====
- Mike Goutokuji (豪徳寺 ミケ) — Stage 1 midboss and boss. She is a maneki-neko (a lucky cat). She can beckon either money or customers, but she will turn away the other.
- Takane Yamashiro (山城 たかね) — Stage 2 midboss and boss. She is a yamawaro who built the aerial tramway to the Moriya Shrine.
- Sannyo Komakusa (駒草 山如) — Stage 3 midboss and boss. Also known as Komakusa-dayuu. She is protecting the Rainbow Dragon Cave from the protagonists.
- Misumaru Tamatukuri (玉造 魅須丸) — Stage 4 boss. She is a magatama crafter who made Reimu's yin yang orbs.
- Tsukasa Kudamaki (菅牧 典) — Stage 5, 6 and Extra Stage midboss. She is a kuda-gitsune who can convince people easily.
- Megumu Iizunamaru (飯綱丸 龍) — Stage 5 boss. She is the general of the crow tengu of the Youkai Mountain. She is the main antagonist.
- Chimata Tenkyuu (天弓 千亦) — Stage 6 boss. She is a market god who created the cards in order to gain faith for herself.
- Momoyo Himemushi (姫虫 百々世) — Extra Stage boss. She is a centipede who can eat dragons.

== Development ==
In late February 2021, Unconnected Marketeers was announced on ZUN's official website and Twitter page. The game's demo was released on March 21, at Reitaisai, and the full game was released on May 4 on Steam, while physical copies were released in Japan on May 13.

== Reception ==
The card system of Unconnected Marketeers was received positively, with reviewers claiming that the mechanic improved the game's replayability. Noisy Pixel gave the game a 9/10, praising the game's spell cards, dialogue, and the card collecting mechanic: "card collecting is addicting, and picking them up during a run is the facelift the bullet hell series needed. Utilizing the ability card system, both series veterans and beginners can enjoy the frenzied sidestepping and iconic, snarky characters that Touhou is known for."
