= Shoot the Bullet =

2005 video game

- Developer: Team Shanghai Alice
- Publisher: Team Shanghai Alice
- Series: Touhou Project
- Platform: Microsoft Windows
- Release: December 30, 2005
- Genre: Shoot 'em up photography
- Mode: Single-player

Touhou Bunkachou ~ Shoot the Bullet. (Japanese: 東方文花帖 〜 Shoot the Bullet.; lit. "Oriental Cultural Album"), commonly abbreviated as StB in English-speaking circles, is a 2005 bullet hell photography game in the Touhou Project by Team Shanghai Alice. It is the second spinoff in the series and is numbered as the 9.5th installment, as the events take place between Phantasmagoria of Flower View (the ninth in the series) and Mountain of Faith (the tenth). It was first released at Comiket 69 on December 30, 2005.

== Gameplay ==
In Shoot the Bullet, unlike other bullet hells in the franchise, the player cannot shoot projectiles at enemies. Instead, the player plays as Aya Shameimaru, who must shoot photographs to clear the screen of bullets and take down bosses. Scores are determined by the aesthetics of each photograph taken, such as colours and bullet density, and the risk taken to take these photos. For each "scene", Aya is only given one life to complete the objective — to take a certain number of pictures of the boss without being hit in a limited amount of time.

Aya (centre) photographing the danmaku of Alice (top).

To take pictures, the film of the camera must be fully loaded, which increases passively. The player can move at three speeds, a normal speed, a focused speed, and a super-focused speed which allows for the camera's film to be loaded quicker. When taking pictures, the player can hold the shoot button to control the viewfinder while the picture frame shrinks — this can be used to zoom in on the boss. During this time, all bullets on screen are slowed down and Aya cannot move. If the shoot button is held for too long, the film will get overexposed and has to be reloaded. The player can also press the shoot button once without holding to take a snapshot around Aya. For every picture taken, Aya will need to reload the film from 0% again before she can take another picture. Only photos that contain an image of the boss ("Success" pictures) will be taken into account when tallying up the score.

== Plot ==
Aya Shameimaru is the tengu reporter of the Gensokyo newspaper Bunbunmaru Shinbun, which she self-manages. Aya goes to search for suitable news topics by taking pictures of bullet patterns with her analog camera. However, she decides not to shoot the subjects with her own danmaku as she does not want her own bullets in her photographs. No one knows what she does with these pictures except herself.

Apart from the game's synopsis, there is no traditional plot to follow. Aya faces a majority of bosses from past Touhou Project installments in levels featuring their spell cards. After reaching a preset score, she will leave a scene-specific comment of that spell card.

The characters Aya faces off against are recurring bosses from previous Touhou games from Embodiment of Scarlet Devil to Phantasmagoria of Flower View.

== Development ==
The only member of Team Shanghai Alice, who goes by the pseudonym "ZUN", recognized that all past installments of the Touhou Project drew inspiration from arcade games, so he wanted to turn all that around and make an experimental PC game that throws arcade conventions aside.

The idea of a danmaku photography game first came to ZUN when he was taking snapshots of bullet patterns during the production of Embodiment of Scarlet Devil so that he could name them into "spell cards" to distinguish one pattern from another. He realized that taking snapshots was quite fun, and the idea should make a good game. After Embodiment of Scarlet Devil, ZUN tried to incorporate this idea into a new weapon type for Reimu Hakurei (the main character of the Touhou Project) where she would take pictures and seal away bullets. However, ZUN felt that he was forcing a totally new idea into the game unnaturally, since none of the characters in the games had a reason to shoot photos; so he filed the idea away for two years until after Imperishable Night was released.

ZUN decided that in order to introduce the idea naturally, he needed a character who actually had a reason to shoot photographs. Thus, he created the reporter girl Aya Shameimaru and planned to introduce her in the upcoming game Phantasmagoria of Flower View so that she can become the main character of a future photography game without being too abrupt. During this process, the manga publisher Ichijinsha was planning a manga anthology of Touhou Project dōjinshi, but ZUN decided that he can use this opportunity to introduce Aya, and negotiated with Ichijinsha to turn the anthology into a fanbook that contains samplings of Aya's newspaper. The result was Touhou Bunkachou ~ Bohemian Archive in Japanese Red., which was released three days before Phantasmagoria of Flower View. ZUN had originally planned to include the photography game along with the fanbook, but ZUN did not have enough time to make that happen. Even so, ZUN continued to use the name "Touhou Bunkachou" for his photography game without Ichijinsha's authorization (although Ichijinsha later agreed to let ZUN use the name). Development took a month and a half to finish, and the game Touhou Bunkachou ~ Shoot the Bullet. was finally released on December 30, 2005. The game was also released on Steam on June 18, 2021.

=== Post-release ===
On January 9, 2006, ZUN added an empty level called "Gōgai" (号外; "Extra" in the newspaper sense) after Level Ex with the version 1.01a patch, with the promise that he would add playable stages in it at a later time. On October 16, 2006, however, ZUN announced that he will not make the "Gōgai" stages since he does not have the time, and he would rather move forward onto new projects, thus leaving an empty level hanging in Shoot the Bullet.

In addition to being a standalone game, Shoot the Bullet has been used as a game engine on which ZUN's future games base. Mountain of Faith and Uwabami Breakers (Drinking Party, 2007) are two games which use Shoot the Bullet as their prototype.

On March 14, 2010, Shoot the Bullet's sequel Double Spoiler was released. It retains the gameplay of Shoot the Bullet with renewed characters.
