= Phantasmagoria of Flower View =

2005 bullet hell versus video game

- Original CD-ROM cover with silhouette of Eiki Shiki
- Developer: Team Shanghai Alice
- Publisher: Team Shanghai Alice
- Composer: Team Shanghai Alice
- Series: Touhou Project
- Platform: Windows
- Release: JP: 14 August 2005 (Note: Phantasmagoria of Flower View was sold on the final day of Comiket 68.)
- Genre: Bullet hell (danmaku)
- Modes: Single-player, multiplayer

Touhou Kaeizuka ~ Phantasmagoria of Flower View (東方花映塚 〜 Phantasmagoria of Flower View.; lit. "Oriental Flower Viewing Mound") is a 2005 bullet hell shooter developed by Team Shanghai Alice. It is the ninth official game in the Touhou Project series. Phantasmagoria of Flower View, like the third Touhou Project game Phantasmagoria of Dim. Dream, differs from other games in the series in that two players battle each other simultaneously. Each player generates large, intricate swarms of projectiles to try to strike the other. In this regard, the gameplay resembles Twinkle Star Sprites by ADK.

== Gameplay ==
A match between Sakuya (left) and Medicine (right). Medicine has just launched a spell card attack, which appears on Sakuya's screen.

Phantasmagoria of Flower View is a split-screen, vertically scrolling shoot 'em up video game in which two players use attacks to defend themselves from enemies that release bullets in their direction. Players can also, under certain conditions, release spell cards onto the opponent's screen. Like most Touhou Project games, in Flower View, the player has a health bar, allowing them to survive multiple hits, and each stage ends when one player depletes their opponent's health.

The game features a Story Mode, wherein the player fights a total of nine increasingly difficult opponents. After a one-credit clear, the Extra Mode is unlocked, containing a difficult single stage in which the player has only a single life. In the game's Match Mode, the player can fight an opponent in a single stage, controlled either by AI or human opponents, locally or over the Internet.

== Plot ==
An abnormally lush spring has arrived in the enclave of Gensokyo. Every plant is in full bloom, including out-of-season flowers and bamboo, and the fairies and creatures become hyperactive. The game's heroines set out to discover the reason behind this unnatural spring. The cause is a supernatural occurrence that happens once every sixty years (one sexagenary cycle), when something major happens in the outside world and fills Gensokyo with ghosts, which then infest flowers and cause them to bloom excessively.

== Characters ==
The characters of PoFV. Left column: Reimu, Sakuya, Reisen, Lyrica, Lunasa, Tewi, Medicine, Komachi. Right column: Marisa, Youmu, Cirno, Merlin, Mystia, Aya, Yuka, Eiki.

A total of 16 characters are available to play. All are playable in Match Mode, while 14 are playable in the Story Mode and 14 are playable in Extra Mode.

- Reimu Hakurei (博麗 霊夢) is the miko of the Hakurei Shrine. She goes out to investigate the massive blooming of flowers, thinking that if she does not do something about it, others will think she is neglecting her duties.
- Marisa Kirisame (霧雨 魔理沙) is an ordinary magician. She sets out to investigate the flowers simply because she is bored.
- Sakuya Izayoi (十六夜 咲夜) is the maid of the Scarlet Devil Mansion. She did not sense any danger from the flowers, so she collects tea along with her investigation.
- Youmu Konpaku (魂魄 妖夢) is a half-ghost from the Netherworld. The ghost princess of the Netherworld, Yuyuko, was not interested in investigating the flower outbreak, so Youmu investigates it on her own.
- Reisen Udongein Inaba (鈴仙・優曇華院・イナバ) is a rabbit from the moon who now resides in Eientei. The rabbits of Eientei became restless because of the blooming flowers, so Reisen decides to investigate and, on the way, tries to look for Tewi, who went missing.
- Cirno (チルノ) is an ice fairy of the lake by the Scarlet Devil Mansion. Since the flowers are exciting the fairies, she sets out to enjoy the festivities. In the manual of the game, ZUN labeled her as "⑨ Idiot" (⑨バカ, baka) in a screenshot. Since then, the symbol ⑨ (pronounced "marukyū" in Japanese or "nineball" in English) gained notoriety as a shorthand for Cirno and "idiot" in the Touhou fandom.
- Lyrica Prismriver (リリカ・プリズムリバー) is the keyboardist of the Prismriver Sisters. She separates from her sisters and sets out to gather musical inspiration during the flower outbreak.
- Merlin Prismriver (メルラン・プリズムリバー) is the trumpeter of the Prismriver Sisters, who has no interest in the flower outbreak. Playable only in Match Mode.
- Lunasa Prismriver (ルナサ・プリズムリバー) is the violinist of the Prismriver Sisters, who has no interest in the flower outbreak. Playable only in Match Mode.
- Mystia Lorelei (ミスティア・ローレライ) is a night sparrow who loves to sing. This time she simply wants to find a place to make music.
- Tewi Inaba (因幡 てゐ) is the leader of the rabbits in Eientei. The rabbits grew excited by the flowers, including Tewi, and she went out to play without informing anyone. In earlier games, her name is spelled "Tei".
- Aya Shameimaru (射命丸 文) is a reporter in the tengu society. She writes for her own newspaper, the Bunbunmaru Shinbun (文々。新聞) (lit. “Bunbunmaru Newspaper”). Thinking that the flowering incident would provide a news story, she goes to investigate potential newsmakers. Although this is her first game appearance, she was first introduced as the main character of the official Touhou fanbook Bohemian Archive in Japanese Red, which was published shortly before the game's release. In this game, her name is spelled in kunrei-shiki as "Syameimaru".
- Medicine Melancholy (メディスン・メランコリー) is an abandoned doll who gained free will over the years due to exposure to lily-of-the-valley plants. The massive blooming strengthened the poison in the lily-of-the-valley plants, prompting Medicine to test her poisonous abilities on those she encounters.
- Yuuka Kazami (風見 幽香) is a yōkai with the power to manipulate flowers, returning with a new design and a new surname since her appearance in Lotus Land Story for the PC-98. Although the flowering incident is not her doing, she becomes the prime suspect.
- Komachi Onozuka (小野塚 小町) is a shinigami who is responsible for ferrying dead spirits across the Sanzu River, but her negligence causes the already abundant spirits to reside in the flowers of Gensokyo, resulting in the massive blooming incident. Playable in Extra Mode and Match Mode.
- Eiki Shiki, Yamaxanadu (四季映姫・ヤマザナドゥ) is the Yama responsible for judging the dead of Gensokyo, reflected in her title Yamaxanadu, or "Yama of Xanadu". Dead spirits are not crossing the Sanzu River, so she goes to check on her subordinate, Komachi. She also takes this opportunity to lecture whoever heads her way on their various faults. Playable in Extra Mode and Match Mode.

== Development ==
ZUN, the sole member of the developer Team Shanghai Alice, originally did not plan to make a game for summer 2005; however, he changed his mind when he realized that 2005 marked the tenth anniversary of the Touhou Project and decided to make a fanservice-type game to mark the occasion. He believed that, in a game, the best kind of fanservice is to pit players against each other so they can have a chance to meet and so tournaments can take place. In this spirit, ZUN adapted the system used by Twinkle Star Sprites to create a versus shooter, focusing on dodging bullets (as in other Touhou games) rather than shooting opponents down. Although ZUN usually develops his games alone, alphes from the dōjin circle Twilight Frontier is listed as a "Graphics Helper" in this game.

After releasing the game at the 68th Comiket, ZUN worked on a netplay patch to support online multiplayer and released it in October 2005. The patch was not without its problems, as online games were often unsynchronized and unstable. However, a year later, ZUN announced that he would not continue making patches to enhance PoFV's netplay because he wanted to move forward.

ZUN had also written a short spin-off story to PoFV named "Sexagennially Empurpled Fragrant Flower" (六十年ぶりに紫に香る花), included in the fanbook Seasonal Dream Vision, featuring Yukari Yakumo as its main character.

Phantasmagoria of Flower View was released on Steam on April 25, 2022. The release supports Steam's "Remote Play Together" feature for online multiplayer. This makes it the only game from Touhou's "Windows Generation No. 1" currently available for purchase, as the source code for the other games, including Phantasmagoria itself until recently, is believed to be lost.
