= List of Touhou Project games =

Video game series

Touhou Project is a bullet hell video game series created by independent Japanese doujin soft developer Team Shanghai Alice, a one-person circle run by ZUN. He has developed programming, graphics, writing, and music for the series, publishing 20 mainline games and 13 spin-offs since 1997, and he collaborated with doujin developer Twilight Frontier on seven of the official spin-offs, six of which are fighting games.

The first five games were developed for the Japanese PC-98 computer, with the first, Highly Responsive to Prayers, released in August 1997; the series' signature danmaku (弾幕; lit. 'bullet curtain') mechanics were introduced in the second game, Story of Eastern Wonderland (also released in 1997). The release of Embodiment of Scarlet Devil in August 2002 marked a shift to Microsoft Windows. Numerous sequels followed, including several spin-offs departing from the traditional shoot 'em up format. Touhou Project was recognized by Guinness World Records in 2010 as the "most prolific fan-made shooter series".

== Summary ==
Games are sorted by their in-game IDs. IDs numbered with decimals are official spin-offs.

Touhou Project summary table
ID	Name	Release date	Platform	Genre	Notes
TH01	Highly Responsive to Prayers (東方靈異伝, Tōhō Reiiden; lit. 'Wondrous Tale')	November 3, 1996	PC-98	Block breaker	
TH02	Story of Eastern Wonderland (東方封魔録, Tōhō Fūmaroku; lit. 'Demon-Sealing Record')	August 15, 1997	PC-98	STG (shoot 'em up)	
TH03	Phantasmagoria of Dim. Dream (東方夢時空, Tōhō Yumejikū; lit. 'Dream Space-Time')	December 29, 1997	PC-98	STG	
TH04	Lotus Land Story (東方幻想郷, Tōhō Gensōkyō; lit. 'Fantasy Land')	August 14, 1998	PC-98	STG	
TH05	Mystic Square (東方怪綺談, Tōhō Kaikidan; lit. 'Bizarre Romantic Story')	December 30, 1998	PC-98	STG	
TH06	Embodiment of Scarlet Devil (東方紅魔郷, Tōhō Kōmakyō; lit. 'Scarlet Devil Land')	August 11, 2002	Microsoft Windows	STG	
TH06NC	Touhou Koumakyou: New Classic – the Embodiment of Scarlet Devil (東方紅魔郷: New Classic 〜 the Embodiment of Scarlet Devil)	September 10, 2026	Microsoft Windows	STG	Official remake
TH07	Perfect Cherry Blossom (東方妖々夢, Tōhō Yōyōmu; lit. 'Ghostly Dream')	August 17, 2003	Microsoft Windows	STG	
TH7.5	Immaterial and Missing Power (東方萃夢想, Tōhō Suimusō; lit. 'Gathering Reverie')	December 30, 2004	Microsoft Windows	Fighting game	Collaboration with Twilight Frontier
TH08	Imperishable Night (東方永夜抄, Tōhō Eiyashō; lit. 'Eternal Night Vignette')	August 15, 2004	Microsoft Windows	STG	
TH09	Phantasmagoria of Flower View (東方花映塚, Tōhō Kaeizuka; lit. 'Flower Reflecting Mound')	August 14, 2005	Microsoft Windows	STG	
TH9.5	Shoot the Bullet (東方文花帖, Tōhō Bunkachō; lit. 'Word Flower Album')	December 30, 2005	Microsoft Windows	STG	
TH10	Mountain of Faith (東方風神録, Tōhō Fūjinroku; lit. 'Wind God Chronicles')	August 17, 2007	Microsoft Windows	STG	
TH10.5	Scarlet Weather Rhapsody (東方緋想天, Tōhō Hisōten; lit. 'Scarlet Perception Heaven')	May 20, 2008	Microsoft Windows	Fighting game	Collaboration with Twilight Frontier
TH11	Subterranean Animism (東方地霊殿, Tōhō Chireiden; lit. 'Earth-Spirit Palace')	August 16, 2008	Microsoft Windows	STG	
TH12	Undefined Fantastic Object (東方星蓮船, Tōhō Seirensen; lit. 'Star-Lotus Ship')	August 15, 2009	Microsoft Windows	STG	
TH12.3	Touhou Hisoutensoku (東方非想天則 〜 超弩級ギニョルの謎を追え, Tōhō Hisōtensoku ~ Chōdokyū Ginyoru no Nazo o Oe; lit. 'Unperceiving of Natural Law ~ Chase the Enigma of the Gargantuan Guignol')	August 15, 2009	Microsoft Windows	Fighting game	Collaboration with Twilight Frontier
TH12.5	Double Spoiler (ダブルスポイラー 〜 東方文花帖, Daburu Supoiraa ~ Tōhō Bunkachō; lit. 'Word Flower Album')	March 14, 2010	Microsoft Windows	STG	
TH12.8	Fairy Wars (妖精大戦争 〜 東方三月精, Yōsei Daisensō ~ Tōhō Sangetsusei; lit. 'Great Fairy Wars ~ Three Fairies')	August 14, 2010	Microsoft Windows	STG	
TH13	Ten Desires (東方神霊廟, Tōhō Shinreibyō; lit. 'Divine Spirit Mausoleum')	August 13, 2011	Microsoft Windows	STG	
TH13.5	Hopeless Masquerade (東方心綺楼, Tōhō Shinkirō; lit. 'Heart Elegant Tower')	May 26, 2013	Microsoft Windows	Fighting game	Collaboration with Twilight Frontier
TH14	Double Dealing Character (東方輝針城, Tōhō Kishinjō; lit. 'Shining Needle Castle')	August 12, 2013	Microsoft Windows	STG	
TH14.3	Impossible Spell Card (弾幕アマノジャク, Danmaku Amanojaku; lit. 'Bullet Curtain Amanojaku')	May 11, 2014	Microsoft Windows	STG	
TH14.5	Urban Legend in Limbo (東方深秘録, Tōhō Shinpiroku; lit. 'Deep Secret Record')	May 10, 2015	Microsoft Windows	Fighting game	Collaboration with Twilight Frontier
TH15	Legacy of Lunatic Kingdom (東方紺珠伝, Tōhō Kanjuden; lit. 'Ultramarine Orb Tale')	August 14, 2015	Microsoft Windows	STG	
TH15.5	Antinomy of Common Flowers (東方憑依華, Tōhō Hyōibana; lit. 'Spirit Possession Bloom')	May 10, 2015	Microsoft Windows	Fighting game	Collaboration with Twilight Frontier
TH16	Hidden Star in Four Seasons (東方天空璋, Tōhō Tenkūshō; lit. 'Heavenly Jade Dipper')	August 11, 2017	Microsoft Windows	STG	
TH16.5	Violet Detector (秘封ナイトメアダイアリー, Hifū Naitomea Daiarī; lit. 'Secret Sealing Nightmare Diary')	August 10, 2018	Microsoft Windows	STG	
TH17	Wily Beast and Weakest Creature (東方鬼形獣, Tōhō Kikeijū; lit. 'Oni-Shaped Beast')	August 12, 2019	Microsoft Windows	STG	
TH17.5	Sunken Fossil World (東方剛欲異聞 〜 水没した沈愁地獄, Tōhō Gōyoku Ibun ~ Suibotsushita Chinshū Jigoku; lit. 'Strange Tale of Avarice ~ Submerged Hell of Sunken Sorrow')	October 24, 2021	Microsoft Windows	Action game	Collaboration with Twilight Frontier
TH18	Unconnected Marketeers (東方虹龍洞, Tōhō Kōryūdō; lit. 'Rainbow Dragon Cave')	May 4, 2021	Microsoft Windows	STG	
TH18.5	100th Black Market (バレットフィリア達の闇市場, Barettofiriatachi no Yami-Ichiba; lit. 'Bulletphiles' Black Market')	August 14, 2022	Microsoft Windows	STG	
TH19	Unfinished Dream of All Living Ghost (東方獣王園, Tōhō Jūōen; lit. 'Beast King Garden')	August 13, 2023	Microsoft Windows	STG	
TH20	Fossilized Wonders (東方錦上京, Tōhō Kinjōkyō; lit. 'Crowning Glory Capital')	August 17, 2025	Microsoft Windows	STG	

== PC-98 games ==
Cover art for Touhou Project PC-98 games

In the 1990s, ZUN, a student at Tokyo Denki University working under the name "ZUN Soft", developed the first five Touhou Project games for the PC-98, utilizing the platform's 16-bit color graphics and 6-channel FM synthesis audio. The games were published by Amusement Makers, a student game development club that ZUN was a member of. These five works are commonly referred as "old works" (旧作, kyūsaku) in the Japanese community.

=== Highly Responsive to Prayers ===
Highly Responsive to Prayers (東方靈異伝, Tōhō Reiiden; lit. 'Wondrous Tale'), the first game in the series, was released on August 15, 1997, at Comiket 52. ZUN began development in 1995 and first showcased the game in November 1996 at the 20th Hatoyama Matsuri, the annual fair held at the Hatoyama campus of Tokyo Denki University. It features the first appearance of series protagonist Reimu Hakurei, the miko of Hakurei Shrine (博麗神社 Hakurei Jinja). After the destruction of the shrine, she charges through a gateway to another world, intent on locating and punishing those responsible. It features gameplay similar to Arkanoid and differs from the vertically-scrolling format of later games. Players direct a Yin-Yang Orb (陰陽玉 Onmyō-gyoku) by side-kicking, swinging Reimu's purification rod (御幣 gohei), and firing amulets (御札 ofuda), with the goal of using it to overturn all the cards in a level. If the player runs out of time, bullets rain down from the top of the screen until the player either completes the level or dies. There are 20 stages, with every fifth stage being a battle where the player must use the orb to deal damage to a boss. After completing Stage 5, the player is given a choice between two routes, Makai (魔界, lit. 'Demon World') and Hell (地獄 jigoku), with each featuring distinct stages, bosses, and endings. It introduces the last-resort "Bomb" system, present in some form in all subsequent games, as well as the four levels of difficulty that would become hallmarks of the series: Easy, Normal, Hard, and Lunatic. According to ZUN, 30 copies of the game were sold.

=== Story of Eastern Wonderland ===
Story of Eastern Wonderland (東方封魔録, Tōhō Fūmaroku; lit. 'Demon-Sealing Record'), the second game in the series, was released alongside Highly Responsive to Prayers at Comiket 52. Reimu Hakurei returns from a training session in the mountains only to find the Hakurei Shrine overrun by ghosts and yōkai. Excited at the opportunity to test her abilities, she takes off with her Yin-Yang Orbs on the back of her turtle Genjii to seek out the source of the invasion. It is the first vertically-scrolling danmaku (弾幕 "barrage", lit. 'bullet curtain') game and also marks the first appearance of Marisa Kirisame, the second major playable character in the series, who appears as the Stage 4 boss. ZUN has cited shoot 'em up arcade game Darius Gaiden as an influence for the gameplay, which consists of firing bullets at bosses that appear from the top of the screen while simultaneously dodging their attacks. It is the only game in the series with five stages (excluding the extra stage). The game introduces many features that have become standard, including weapon selection, hitboxes that are smaller than the player character, power-ups, mid-bosses, and an unlockable Extra Stage. Fifty copies of the game were sold.

=== Phantasmagoria of Dim. Dream ===
Phantasmagoria of Dim. Dream (東方夢時空, Tōhō Yumejikū; lit. 'Dream Space-Time'), the third game in the series, was released on December 29, 1997, at Comiket 53. While enjoying a quiet morning walk, Reimu Hakurei stumbles across mysterious ruins that have suddenly appeared a short distance from the Hakurei Shrine's gateway. She joins in a violent competition with several others who want to explore them, as it is said that the one who reaches the heart of the ruins first will win a prize. In Match Play Mode, it is a versus-type scrolling shooter similar to Twinkle Star Sprites, in which two players engage in danmaku battles in split-screen. In Story Mode, the player faces off against nine increasingly skilled AI opponents. The combat makes use of a "Spell Gauge", with characters unleashing attacks of varying strength based on their charged level of magical power. Approximately 100 to 150 copies of the game were sold.

=== Lotus Land Story ===
Lotus Land Story (東方幻想郷, Tōhō Gensōkyō; lit. 'Fantasy Land'), the fourth game in the series, was released on August 14, 1998, at Comiket 54. The peace in Gensokyo (first used in this game's title) is broken when a tremendous energy surges from beneath a mountain lake, causing yōkai to swarm the Hakurei Shrine. Reimu Hakurei and Marisa Kirisame travel to seek out and eliminate the source of the disturbance, battling yōkai along the way. It features six stages, with the game ending after Stage 5 if the player selects Easy difficulty or uses a "continue". A notable new feature is a "graze" counter for near-misses. According to ZUN, 200 to 300 copies of the game were sold.

=== Mystic Square ===
Mystic Square (東方怪綺談, Tōhō Kaikidan; lit. 'Bizarre Romantic Story'), the fifth and final Touhou Project game for the PC-98 system, was released on December 30, 1998, at Comiket 55. When demons begin emerging from a cave high in the mountains of Gensokyo, Reimu Hakurei and others must travel to the depths of Makai to confront the one behind the incident. Mima and Yuuka, the final bosses of Story of Eastern Wonderland and Lotus Land Story respectively, return as playable characters along with Marisa Kirisame. The game contains six stages and includes a "Dream Gauge" system, which rewards the player for collecting items by clearing all enemy bullets when it is filled to maximum.

== Windows games ==
After the release of Mystic Square, ZUN graduated from university and the series became inactive for four years. During this time, he worked at Taito as a game developer and also composed music for various games created by Seihou Project, a circle formed by a member of Amusement Makers. He left the group in 2001 to focus on game development for Microsoft Windows, forming the one-man doujin circle Team Shanghai Alice and self-publishing all subsequent games. According to ZUN, the Windows games represent a "clean slate" for the series canon, albeit with many carry-overs and references from the PC-98 era. Games numbered with decimals are spin-offs from the main series that vary in genre.

=== Embodiment of Scarlet Devil ===
Embodiment of Scarlet Devil (東方紅魔郷, Tōhō Kōmakyō; lit. 'Scarlet Devil Land'), the sixth game in the series and the first on Windows, was released on August 11, 2002, at Comiket 62. It marked a dramatic graphical improvement from the PC-98 games, and the game's music and sounds used synthesized PCM and MIDI instead of FM synthesis. It introduces the "Spell Card" system, in which bosses fire danmaku patterns in a specific sequence as their health is depleted, with a health bar and unique name for each attack appearing on screen as it is used. For comparison, in the PC-98 games, boss characters would have a select few danmaku patterns that they would switch between at random.

A peaceful summer in Gensokyo is interrupted when an ominous scarlet mist blocks out the sun. As either the shrine maiden Reimu Hakurei or the magician Marisa Kirisame, the player must infiltrate the Scarlet Devil Mansion (紅魔館 Koumakan) and confront the mysterious Scarlet Devil that lives within. The game features the debut of Sakuya Izayoi, who would become a playable character in several sequels.

Several gameplay elements from the PC-98 era were revived in Embodiment of Scarlet Devil, helping to establish a foundation that later Windows titles in the series would follow. One key feature is the selection of an attack style at the beginning of each game. This choice directly influences the character's shot type—determining how their primary weapon behaves—as well as the nature and function of their Spell Card bomb, which serves as a powerful, screen-clearing ability in critical situations. A limited number of these "bombs" are provided as a method of escaping from difficult situations by dealing heavy damage to enemies, cancelling enemy bullets, and collecting all items on the screen. A notable feature added in this game and present in future main entries is Focused Fire mode, which allows the player to slow their movement and focus their shots when activated. The game features six increasingly difficult stages, with the boss of each stage being preceded by a less powerful "midboss". Playing on Easy difficulty causes the game to prematurely end after Stage 5, and completing the game after using a "continue" results in a bad ending. Once a good ending has been achieved on Normal or higher difficulty, the player unlocks a bonus "Extra Stage", which features the game's final boss battle.

On September 10, 2026, a remake of Embodiment of Scarlet Devil was released under the title Touhou Koumakyou: New Classic ~ The Embodiment of Scarlet Devil. It was developed by Team Shanghai Alice Reprise, a new development team helmed by ZUN to develop remakes of early Touhou titles. It is available on Steam, Nintendo Switch and Switch 2, and PlayStation 5. It is available in 11 different languages, making it the first time any mainline Touhou title has been localised outside of Japan.

=== Perfect Cherry Blossom ===
Perfect Cherry Blossom (東方妖々夢, Tōhō Yōyōmu; lit. 'Ghostly Dream'), the seventh installment in the series, was released on August 17, 2003, at Comiket 64. As May arrives, it becomes clear that winter in Gensokyo has lasted far longer than usual. As Reimu, Marisa, or Sakuya, the player must embark on a trip to the Netherworld (冥界 Meikai, lit. 'Realm of the Dead') to find those responsible for stopping the coming of spring. With the addition of Sakuya, Perfect Cherry Blossom continues the series tradition of former bosses reappearing as playable characters. It also features a "Cherry Gauge", which is filled by grazing, shooting enemies, and completing Spell Cards without using bombs, which when full, activates a "Supernatural Border", giving the player a temporary shield. Alice Margatroid from Mystic Square makes her Windows debut in this game. As well as featuring an extra stage, the game also has an unlockable phantasm stage that can be accessed after the player clears the extra stage and has captured a certain amount of spell cards.

=== Immaterial and Missing Power ===
Immaterial and Missing Power (東方萃夢想, Tōhō Suimusō; lit. 'Gathering Reverie'), the 7.5th game in the series and the first versus fighting game, was released on December 30, 2004, at Comiket 67. It is a 2D fighting game with danmaku influences, as reflected by its heavy emphasis on Spell Card projectile attacks. As with all the official fighting games, it was primarily developed by Twilight Frontier, with ZUN providing scenarios, Spell Card designs, and several music tracks. Between the events of Perfect Cherry Blossom and Imperishable Night, a strange mist descends on Gensokyo as Reimu Hakurei and other residents find themselves inexplicably holding a feast every three days. Initial playable characters include Reimu, Marisa, Sakuya, Alice, Youmu Konpaku from Perfect Cherry Blossom, and Patchouli Knowledge from Embodiment of Scarlet Devil. Additionally playable characters become unlocked as the player completes the initial scenarios. A local multiplayer mode is included, with an unofficial patch enabling netplay.

=== Imperishable Night ===
Imperishable Night (東方永夜抄, Tōhō Eiyashō; lit. 'Eternal Night Vignette'), the eighth game in the series, was released on August 15, 2004, at Comiket 66. It is the eve of Gensokyo's yearly Harvest Moon Festival (月見 Tsukimi) when it is discovered that the moon has been replaced with a fake. Two-person teams of humans and yōkai set out into the Bamboo Forest of the Lost (迷いの竹林 Mayoi no Chikurin) to confront the culprits and restore the moon before the night is over. The four playable teams are the Illusionary Barrier Team (Reimu Hakurei and Yukari Yakumo), the Aria of Forbidden Magic Team (Marisa Kirisame and Alice Margatroid), the Visionary Scarlet Devil Team (Sakuya Izayoi and Remilia Scarlet), and the Netherworld Dwellers' Team (Youmu Konpaku and Yuyuko Saigyouji), with the player swapping between characters on a team by activating Focused Fire mode. It adds powerful "Last Word" Spell Cards for players and enemies, as well as "Time Orb" items that affect the story by changing the speed at which the night passes.

=== Phantasmagoria of Flower View ===
Phantasmagoria of Flower View (東方花映塚, Tōhō Kaeizuka; lit. 'Flower Reflecting Mound'), the ninth game in the series, was released on August 15, 2005, at Comiket 68. The game is a split-screen versus-type shooter similar to Phantasmagoria of Dim. Dream. Spring has arrived and Gensokyo's flowers are blooming out of control, with even out-of-season varieties in full bloom. The player must battle their way through nine stages to reach Muenzuka (無縁塚, lit. '(Burial) Mound of the Nameless') and reveal the truth behind the abnormal spring. Initial playable characters include Reimu, Marisa, Sakuya, Youmu, and Reisen Udongein Inaba from Imperishable Night, with a total of 16 playable characters after all of them are unlocked. An official patch enabling multiplayer netplay has been released.

=== Shoot the Bullet ===
Shoot the Bullet (東方文花帖, Tōhō Bunkachō; lit. 'Word Flower Album'), the 9.5th game in the series, was released on December 30, 2005, at Comiket 69. The game was originally created as a minigame to be included with the official fanbook Bohemian Archive in Japanese Red, but was later developed into a full game. Playing as tengu reporter Aya Shameimaru, the player is tasked with photographing bosses and their danmaku in 10 increasingly difficult stages. The game is unique in that the player has no standard shot or bombs; rather, the camera is the main method of offense and defense, as it clears bullets from the screen when used. Scoring is based on the contents of each photo, including the amount and type of bullets included. The game features bosses from Embodiment of Scarlet Devil to Phantasmagoria of Flower View.

=== Mountain of Faith ===
Mountain of Faith (東方風神録, Tōhō Fūjinroku; lit. 'Wind God Chronicles'), the tenth game in the series, was released on August 17, 2007, at Comiket 72. This entry marks a "soft reboot" for the series, with a total overhaul of the game engine that resulted in substantial design and pacing changes. The bomb counter has been removed and replaced by the "Options" system, which adds up to four "satellites" that hover near the player and fire bullets. They can be obtained by collecting power items, and have additional effects based on selected weapon type. The "Faith" system is also used, where players can collect green "Faith" items to increase the value of point items. The game is also one of the three games in the series that allows the player to have unlimited continues, but using one results in the player having to restart the current stage.

One autumn, Reimu receives a message demanding the closure of Hakurei Shrine and threatening its destruction at the hands of the god of Yōkai Mountain. As either Reimu or Marisa, the player must ascend the mountain in order to confront the ones behind the threat and prevent the shrine from being taken over.

=== Scarlet Weather Rhapsody ===
Scarlet Weather Rhapsody (東方緋想天, Tōhō Hisōten; lit. 'Scarlet Perception Heaven'), the 10.5th game in the series and the second versus fighting game, was released on May 25, 2008, at Reitaisai 5. It is a sequel to the first fighting game in the series, Immaterial and Missing Power. The story revolves around strange weather phenomenon occurring around Gensokyo, following Reimu and the other protagonists in their search for the culprit. It features a 20 Spell Card deck system, flying mechanics, and changing weather conditions that affects gameplay. Both local and online multiplayer modes are included in addition to the singleplayer Story Mode.

=== Subterranean Animism ===
Subterranean Animism (東方地霊殿, Tōhō Chireiden; lit. 'Earth-Spirit Palace'), the eleventh game in the series, was released on August 16, 2008, at Comiket 74. A geyser suddenly appears one day near the Hakurei Shrine, spouting evil earth spirits from underground. Playing as Reimu or Marisa, the player must travel to the Underworld (地底 Chitei, lit. 'underground') to find its source, assisted by one of the three yōkai allies communicating from above (Yukari Yakumo, Suika Ibuki, or Aya Shameimaru for Reimu and Alice Margatroid, Patchouli Knowledge, or Nitori Kawashiro for Marisa). The game features graze-based scoring and a variation of the "Options" system introduced in Mountain of Faith.

=== Undefined Fantastic Object ===
Undefined Fantastic Object (東方星蓮船, Tōhō Seirensen; lit. 'Star-Lotus Ship'), the twelfth game in the series, was released on August 15, 2009, at Comiket 76. Spring has come to Gensokyo and a strange flying ship said to bring good omens has appeared in the sky. The player assumes the role of either Reimu, Marisa, or Sanae Kochiya from Mountain of Faith, as the three girls race to board the vessel. "Undefined Fantastic Objects", or UFOs will sometimes appear around the screen, and can be collected for bonus points, lives, or bombs.

=== Touhou Hisoutensoku ===
Touhou Hisoutensoku (東方非想天則 〜 超弩級ギニョルの謎を追え, Tōhō Hisōtensoku ~ Chōdokyū Ginyoru no Nazo o Oe; lit. 'Unperceiving of Natural Law ~ Chase the Enigma of the Gargantuan Guignol'), the 12.3rd game in the series and the third versus fighting game, was released on August 15, 2009, at Comiket 76. It retains much of the gameplay of Scarlet Weather Rhapsody while adding new playable characters, Spell Cards, and weather conditions. The Story Mode, at first has only one playable character, Sanae Kochiya, but after completion, Cirno, and Hong Meiling can be unlocked. The story revolves around a giant creature that has piqued the interest of Gensokyo's residents. The three girls, each with their own ideas as to its nature, set out to investigate the mystery of the giant. Each of the nine playable characters now has an associated Spell Card, which is usable by any character once it is unlocked. Both local and online multiplayer modes are included in addition to the singleplayer Story Mode.

=== Double Spoiler ===
Double Spoiler (ダブルスポイラー 〜 東方文花帖, Daburu Supoiraa ~ Tōhō Bunkachō; lit. 'Word Flower Album'), the 12.5th game in the series, was released on March 14, 2010, at Reitaisai 7. It is a sequel to Shoot the Bullet, following Aya Shameimaru on her mission to photograph the yokai of Gensokyo and their danmaku. It retains much of the same gameplay from its predecessor and features bosses from Mountain of Faith to Undefined Fantastic Object. Aya's colleague and fellow tengu reporter Hatate Himekaidou is an unlockable character. The game was released on Steam on August 2, 2019.

=== Fairy Wars ===
Fairy Wars (妖精大戦争 〜 東方三月精, Yōsei Daisensō ~ Tōhō Sangetsusei; lit. 'Great Fairy Wars ~ Three Fairies'), the 12.8th game in the series, was released on August 14, 2010, at Comiket 78. It is a danmaku shooter based on the official Touhou Sangetsusei manga series. After the Three Fairies of Light destroy Cirno's house one winter, the ice fairy makes plans to take her revenge in the spring. The game features three stages and one playable character, Cirno, who has the unique ability to freeze bullets mid-air. It was released on Steam on August 2, 2019.

=== Ten Desires ===
Ten Desires (東方神霊廟, Tōhō Shinreibyō; lit. 'Divine Spirit Mausoleum'), the thirteenth game in the series, was released on August 13, 2011, at Comiket 80. After the events of Undefined Fantastic Object, Reimu and Marisa notice an increase in spirits in Gensokyo and take off to investigate. Also playable is Sanae, who seeks to utilize the power of the divine spirits for the Moriya Shrine gods, and Youmu, who wants to exterminate spirits that she views as unnecessary. The gameplay includes "Divine Spirits", which are dropped by defeated enemies and come in four varieties (blue, gray, purple, and green). Collecting spirits fills the player's "Trance Gauge", which can be used to enter an invincible "Trance" once filled. It was released on Steam on June 19, 2019.

=== Hopeless Masquerade ===
Hopeless Masquerade (東方心綺楼, Tōhō Shinkirō; lit. 'Heart Elegant Tower'), the 13.5th game in the series and the fourth versus fighting game, was released on May 26, 2013, at Reitaisai 10. The Human Village has fallen into despair in the wake of the high number of incidents, prompting adherents of Gensokyo's three competing religions (Shinto, Taoism, and Buddhism) to battle each other to expand their faith's influence. This concept is reflected in the "Popularity" system: damage dealt and received is measured on a meter, which unlocks a special "Last Word" combo when it is filled to its maximum. The game features a completely new engine from the one used in the previous three fighting games. Both local and online multiplayer modes are included in addition to the singleplayer Story Mode.

=== Double Dealing Character ===
Double Dealing Character (東方輝針城, Tōhō Kishinjō; lit. 'Shining Needle Castle'), the fourteenth game in the series, was released on August 12, 2013, at Comiket 84. Reimu, Marisa, and Sakuya are playable characters, with gameplay resembling that of Ten Desires. As clouds begin to gather and yōkai rebel all over Gensokyo, the weapons of the three main characters begin to behave bizarrely. On August 10, 2014, the game was confirmed for release on Playism, making Double Dealing Character the first game in the series to be sold for digital download. On May 7, 2015, Playism made the game available for download in Western territories, marking the official Western debut of the series. It was released on Steam on June 19, 2019.

=== Impossible Spell Card ===
Impossible Spell Card (弾幕アマノジャク, Danmaku Amanojaku; lit. 'Bullet Curtain Amanojaku'), the 14.3rd game in the series, was released on May 11, 2014, at Reitaisai 11. The player controls the stage 5 boss of Double Dealing Character, amanojaku Seija Kijin, who uses nine "cheat" items to clear otherwise impossible-to-beat Spell Cards. A bounty is set on Seija, and several characters from previous installments attempt to capture her over ten days. The game was released on Steam on April 1, 2019.

=== Urban Legend in Limbo ===
Urban Legend in Limbo (東方深秘録, Tōhō Shinpiroku; lit. 'Deep Secret Record'), the 14.5th game in the series and the fifth versus fighting game, was released on May 10, 2015, at Reitaisai 12. It features a similar style and gameplay to the series' previous fighting game, Hopeless Masquerade, and adds a new "Occult Ball" system for controlling special moves and battle effects. The story centers on the strange rumors circulating in Gensokyo's Human Village, which have begun to manifest themselves in the form of supernatural anomalies. It was released for PlayStation 4 on December 8, 2016, with several added features (including Reisen Udongein Inaba from Imperishable Night as a playable character), becoming the first game in the series to be released for a console system. Both local and online multiplayer modes are included in addition to the singleplayer Story Mode.

=== Legacy of Lunatic Kingdom ===
Legacy of Lunatic Kingdom (東方紺珠伝, Tōhō Kanjuden; lit. 'Ultramarine Orb Tale'), the fifteenth game in the series, was released on August 14, 2015, at Comiket 88. The game features Reimu, Marisa, Sanae, and Reisen as playable characters. Someone has taken over the Lunar Capital, and Lunarians have come to "purify" Gensokyo in order to make it suitable for them to live in; the girls must work to stop the invasion and find the perpetrator behind the incident. Unlike previous games in the series, Legacy of Lunatic Kingdom features two game modes: Legacy Mode, similar to the previous games, and Pointdevice Mode, which replaces lives and continues with a series of "chapters". When the player gets hit in this mode, they restart from the beginning of the current chapter with a small penalty to their shot power. The game was released on Steam on April 1, 2019.

=== Antinomy of Common Flowers ===
Antinomy of Common Flowers (東方憑依華, Tōhō Hyōibana; lit. 'Spirit Possession Bloom'), the 15.5th game in the series and the sixth versus fighting game, was released on December 29, 2017, at Comiket 93. It is a sequel to Urban Legend in Limbo and reuses the "Occult Ball" system. An urban legend known as the "Perfect Possession" has manifested, combining pairs of Gensokyo residents in a single body and enabling them to battle as a switchable "Master" and "Slave" tag team. The game was released on Steam on January 5, 2018. Both local and online multiplayer modes are included in addition to the singleplayer Story Mode.

=== Hidden Star in Four Seasons ===
Hidden Star in Four Seasons (東方天空璋, Tōhō Tenkūshō; lit. 'Heavenly Jade Dipper'), the sixteenth game in the series, was released on August 11, 2017, at Comiket 92. The seasons in Gensokyo are out of control, with spring meadows alongside summer skies, autumn trees, and winter blizzards. Reimu, Marisa, Aya, and Cirno set out to find the cause of this chaos. The game features a "Sub-Season" system, where the player collects seasonal items (cherry petals, green leaves, red leaves, and snowflakes) in order to gain various boosts. Collected sub-seasons can also be released as a mini-bomb in order to clear enemy projectiles. The game was released on Steam on November 16, 2017, marking the series' Steam debut.

=== Violet Detector ===
Violet Detector (秘封ナイトメアダイアリー, Hifū Naitomea Daiarī; lit. 'Secret Sealing Nightmare Diary'), the 16.5th game in the series, was released on August 10, 2018, at Comiket 94. A danmaku photography game in the style of Shoot the Bullet and Double Spoiler, it features the antagonist of Urban Legend in Limbo, Sumireko Usami, as the playable character. It includes bosses from Legacy of Lunatic Kingdom to Hidden Star in Four Seasons, as well as Reimu, Marisa, and most of the final and extra stage bosses from the previous Windows games. The game was released on Steam on September 5, 2018.

=== Wily Beast and Weakest Creature ===
Wily Beast and Weakest Creature (東方鬼形獣, Tōhō Kikeijū; lit. 'Oni-Shaped Beast'), the seventeenth game in the series, was released on August 12, 2019, at Comiket 96. When Reimu, Marisa and Youmu discover that animal spirits are planning to attack the surface world, they venture into Hell to stop them and are accompanied by one of three friendly spirits ("Wolf", "Otter", or "Eagle"). It features a similar bonus system to Undefined Fantastic Object, with "Spirit Items" (based on the three spirit types) that activate special effects when collected in groups of five. The game was released on Steam on September 9, 2019.

=== Sunken Fossil World ===
Sunken Fossil World (東方剛欲異聞 〜 水没した沈愁地獄, Tōhō Gōyoku Ibun ~ Suibotsushita Chinshū Jigoku; lit. 'Strange Tale of Avarice ~ Submerged Hell of Sunken Sorrow') is the 17.5th game in the series. It is a collaboration between Team Shanghai Alice and Twilight Frontier, and is described on its official website as a "horizontally-scrolling danmaku water action game". A beta version was released on October 6, 2019. The game was scheduled to be released at Reitaisai 18, but in March 2021 Twilight Frontier announced that the game had to be postponed until further notice. It was released on October 24, 2021.

=== Unconnected Marketeers ===
Unconnected Marketeers (東方虹龍洞, Tōhō Kōryūdō; lit. 'Rainbow Dragon Cave'), the eighteenth game in the series, was released on May 4, 2021. The game features Reimu Hakurei, Marisa Kirisame, Sakuya Izayoi, and Sanae Kochiya as playable characters. The game features Ability Cards, which the player acquires to gain various boosts and abilities. The game follows the investigation on Yōkai Mountain of the appearance of these cards. The trial version was released on March 21, 2021, at Reitaisai 18. The demo was later released on Steam on March 24, 2021. The full game was released on May 4, 2021, at Gensou Kagura 5 and on Steam.

=== 100th Black Market ===
100th Black Market (バレットフィリア達の闇市場, Barettofiriatachi no Yami-Ichiba; lit. 'Bulletphiles' Black Market'), the 18.5th game in the series, was released on August 14, 2022, in commemoration of the 100th Comiket event. A subsequent Steam release occurred on the same day.

=== Unfinished Dream of All Living Ghost ===
Unfinished Dream of All Living Ghost (東方獣王園, Tōhō Jūōen; lit. 'Beast King Garden'), the nineteenth game in the series, was announced in April 2023 and was released at Comiket 102 on August 13, 2023, with a Steam release soon after. It features gameplay similar to Phantasmagoria of Dim. Dream and Flower View, this time featuring 19 playable characters, and borrows mechanics from the Ability Card system present in Unconnected Marketeers.

=== Fossilized Wonders ===
Fossilized Wonders (東方錦上京, Tōhō Kinjōkyō; lit. 'Crowning Glory Capital'), the twentieth game in the series, was announced on April 12, 2025. The trial version was released on May 5, 2025, at Reitaisai 22. It was released on August 17, 2025. It includes "Incident Stones", a new mechanic allowing the player to unlock, equip and mix items that affect both gameplay and the story's dialogue.
