= Imperishable Night =

2004 bullet hell video game

- Original CD-ROM cover, featuring the silhouettes of Kaguya Houraisan (in the center) and Fujiwara no Mokou (in the moon in the bottom left).
- Developer: Team Shanghai Alice
- Publisher: Team Shanghai Alice
- Composer: Team Shanghai Alice
- Series: Touhou Project
- Platform: Microsoft Windows
- Release: JP: 15 August 2004 (Note: Imperishable Night was sold on the final day of Comiket 66.)
- Genre: Bullet hell (danmaku)
- Mode: Single-player

Touhou Eiyashou ~ Imperishable Night. (Japanese: 東方永夜抄 〜 Imperishable Night.; lit. "Eternal Night Vignette") is a 2004 vertical bullet hell scrolling shoot 'em up video game developed by Team Shanghai Alice. It is the eighth game in the Touhou Project series, and the third main Touhou Project game to be released specifically for the Windows operating system.

Imperishable Night introduces the 'partner' system, allowing the player a choice between four teams of two characters to switch between, each with their own shot type, in real-time.

The game's story is based on that of the Tale of the Bamboo Cutter and centers around Gensokyo's moon being replaced by a fake during the Harvest Moon Festival, with the chosen team warping time to try to find the culprit before the end of the night and festival. It was first released at the 66th Comiket on August 15, 2004.

== Gameplay ==
Imperishable Night is a vertically scrolling bullet hell video game, in which the player character is always facing towards the top of the screen, shooting bullets at enemies, dodging the bullets shot by them, and having to face a boss at the end of each stage.

Unique to Imperishable Night is the Last Spell mechanic. Some of the bosses' last spell cards are called Last Spells, some of which are regular spell cards that require the player to deplete the boss health meter, whereas others simply require the player to survive until the time runs out. When a Last Spell is active, the player cannot activate their own Spell Cards, and will fail if they are hit, regardless of how many lives they have. The player also has access to Spell Cards referred to as Last Spells, which are secondary Spell Cards that last longer and do more damage, but cost twice as much to use.

Another unique part of Imperishable Night is the bosses. Depending on the player's character, the player will either battle Marisa Kirisame or Reimu Hakurei during the 4th stage of the game. There are also two final bosses, Eirin Yagokoro and Kaguya Houraisan. If the player has used a continue or has not seen the normal ending with that particular team, the game continues to Final A, where they face Eirin; afterwards, if the player is still on their first credit but has not seen the good ending yet, the game continues to Final B, where they face Kaguya. Upon seeing the good ending, the player is able to choose the Final for that team on subsequent one credit runs. It is required to fight both before unlocking the extra stage (except for the unlockable solo characters).

=== Time counter ===
Imperishable Night utilizes a "time" counter, which requires the player to collect a certain number of "time points", which are acquired in the same manner as regular points—collecting point items, grazing enemy bullets, or killing enemies. The game begins at 11:00 PM, and with each stage, thirty minutes passes, or an hour if they fail to gather enough time points. The player will receive a bad ending if the clock reaches 5:00 AM. Time will also advance by half an hour if the player uses a continue, or fails any of the Last Spells of Kaguya Houraisan, the game's final boss, who is also the only character to have multiple Last Spells. Because of this system, Imperishable Night is the only Touhou Project game in which the player can use a continue and still get an ending that is not the bad ending.

=== Human-yōkai pairs ===
Imperishable Night features a total of eight playable characters, in pre-set pairs, and, upon completing the game with all teams, the game allows the player to select these characters individually. Each pair consist of one human, and yōkai, with the human being the player's unfocused shot, and the yokai as the focused shot.

A gauge on the lower left corner of the screen keeps track of how human or yōkai the player is, and affects the player's score accordingly. The gauge, ranging from -100% (human) to 100% (yōkai), is determined by which mode the player uses more. When the player reaches 80%, they can collect time orbs by hitting enemies (as a human) or by grazing against bosses and killing enemies (as a yōkai). Because Youmu Konpaku of the Netherworld Dwellers team is a half-ghost, their gauges are adjusted accordingly (-50% to 50% solo, -50% to 100% as the team), and the minimum values for time orb collection are reduced.

Some enemies use familiars that change their vulnerabilities depending on whether the player is playing as a human or a yōkai at the moment. These familiars are completely invulnerable when the player switches to a yōkai, but at the same time these familiars cannot collide with the yōkai player and do not shoot bullets when the player is on top of them. The enemies' alternating vulnerabilities in this game have been compared to Ikaruga. Bosses may also change their standard attacks depending on the orientation of the player, usually firing slower bullets and/or homing bullets when the player is a yōkai.

=== Spell Practice Mode ===
Eirin Yagokoro's "Last Word" in Spell Practice Mode

The Spell Practice Mode is unlocked by beating the game with the normal ending (i.e. before the game time reaches 5:00 am). This feature allows a character/team to practice any of the game's spell cards, so long as they have encountered them. In this mode, players have only one life and cannot use their spell cards. Clearing spell cards here will show the creator's own comments on the spell cards or the characters associated with them. The stage practice, allowing the player to practice an entire stage, provided they have completed it already, is also present in Imperishable Night.

Only available in the Spell Practice Mode are Last Words, which are typically the hardest spell cards in the game. These spells are earned by accomplishing certain feats such as beating the game using certain characters, or capturing a large enough number of spell cards.

== Plot ==
=== Prologue ===
On the eve of Gensokyo's Harvest Moon Festival, the Moon has been replaced by a fake moon that can never become full. In order to find the real Moon before sunrise, the playable teams notice the imperishable night and set out to search for the person who stole the Moon, so they can return it. Yukari Yakumo, a yokai who manipulates boundaries, notices the lunar incident but finds it too bothersome to handle herself, so she enlists the shrine maiden Reimu Hakurei. Meanwhile, the yokai magician Alice Margatroid notices that no one else is taking action; after her own investigation hits a dead end, she seeks the help of the human magician Marisa Kirisame. At the Scarlet Devil Mansion, the vampire Remilia Scarlet attempts to set out to investigate while leaving her maid Sakuya Izayoi in charge of the house, but Sakuya insists on following as a chaperone. Finally, in the Netherworld, the ghost Yuyuko Saigyouji aimlessly departs, dragging her half-ghost gardener Youmu Konpaku along while claiming that if they simply shoot down whatever is flying, they will eventually hit their target.

=== Main stages ===
Along their journey, the protagonists encounter Wriggle Nightbug, a firefly yokai, and Mystia Lorelei, a night sparrow yokai. They then face Keine Kamishirasawa, a were-hakutaku. Misunderstanding the protagonists as villains coming to attack the Human Village, Keine uses her power to "eat" and hide the village's history to protect it. After being defeated, she hints at the direction of the true culprit. Depending on the playable character, the protagonists then face either Reimu or Marisa as the Stage 4 boss, both of whom had rushed out to investigate because the dawn was failing to arrive and they found the endless night either suspicious or interesting.

The protagonists eventually reach the Bamboo Forest of the Lost, where they encounter the earth rabbit yokai Tewi Inaba, and arrive at Eientei, a mansion guarded by the moon rabbit Reisen Udongein Inaba. Reisen had originally fled from the Moon to Earth out of cowardice, mistakenly fearing an invasion by humanity during the Apollo 11 moon landing. Because the isolated residents of Gensokyo were completely unaware of the Apollo 11 mission, the protagonists are unable to clear up the lunar residents' misunderstanding regarding humanity's intentions.

From here, the team confronts the true culprits: Eirin Yagokoro, a Lunar Sage and genius pharmacist, and Kaguya Houraisan, the exiled moon princess based on the legendary Kaguya-hime from The Tale of the Bamboo Cutter. Kaguya is far younger than Eirin. Eirin, who is older than the moon god Tsukuyomi and helped found the Lunar Capital, misses the era before humans existed. Over 1,300 years ago, Kaguya grew bored, drank the forbidden Hourai Elixir—an immortality drug made by Eirin using Kaguya's power—and was exiled to Earth, where she was raised by a bamboo cutter. When lunar emissaries eventually arrived to retrieve her, Kaguya did not want to return, having grown attached to Earth and fearing life as an impure being on the Moon. Eirin, who served as the emissaries' leader, felt guilty for failing to stop Kaguya from taking the elixir; she murdered the other emissaries and helped Kaguya flee. They cast a spell to seal Eientei and hid in Gensokyo for centuries. Eirin serves Kaguya out of guilt and a desire to protect her, holding back her own superior strength to honor her master, and even drank the elixir herself. To prevent the lunar emissaries from finding Kaguya and taking Reisen back, Eirin replaced the Earth's moon with a fake, severing the link between the Earth and the Moon. The team accepts Kaguya's "Five Impossible Requests" and fights until daybreak. After their defeat, the true Moon is restored, and the lunar exiles decide to stop hiding and live openly as members of Gensokyo. Depending on the ending, characters like Ran Yakumo, Chen, and Patchouli Knowledge also make appearances.

=== Extra stage ===
In the Extra Mode, the team is sent to defeat Kaguya's immortal rival, Fujiwara no Mokou, while Keine guards her. Mokou is a former musician and the daughter of the nobleman Fujiwara no Fuhito, who was previously humiliated by Kaguya's impossible requests. Seeking revenge, Mokou followed the royal envoy Iwakasa up Mount Fuji to steal and destroy the immortality elixir Kaguya left behind. After being rescued by Iwakasa from collapsing, they reached the summit, where Konohana-no-Sakuya-hime stopped Iwakasa from burning the elixir. Tempted by its power, Mokou stole the Hourai Elixir, drank it, and became immortal herself. Ostracized by human society for not aging, she wandered for centuries hunting yokai until she reached Gensokyo. Seeing Kaguya 300 years ago, Mokou felt empathy toward a fellow immortal, though they now spend their days trying to kill each other. Mokou mistakes the protagonists for assassins sent by Kaguya and attacks them.

== Development ==
Imperishable Night was created by Team Shanghai Alice, which consists of a single member, who goes by the pseudonym of ZUN. ZUN had interest in making a danmaku game in which the player can switch between two characters easily during the game, as he believed there were few games that incorporated such a system. The idea for Imperishable Night started with this desire, and the plot was written later to justify this system. ZUN had considered the idea for Embodiment of Scarlet Devil, but he felt that having playable characters that had not previously introduced would be unnatural. Thus he decided to make the system in Team Shanghai Alice's third game, Imperishable Night, so he could introduce new characters in the first and second game.

ZUN found it particularly difficult to find a youkai character to pair Reimu and Marisa with. In the end, ZUN picked Alice from the pre-Windows games to be Marisa's partner since he thought Alice was a "Youkai version of Marisa", and thus reintroduced her in Perfect Cherry Blossom. Yukari was selected to be Reimu's partner because their personalities were similar, making them a natural fit.

=== Character design ===
The characters introduced in Imperishable Night feature various specific design elements and naming conventions conceived by series creator ZUN.

Wriggle Nightbug, despite a boyish appearance that often causes her to be mistaken for a boy, is actually a female yokai. Her design incorporates minimal insect-like features, possessing only antennae and wings while otherwise retaining a completely human form. Keine Kamishirasawa normally appears human, but upon transforming under the full moon into her were-beast Hakutaku form, she gains horns and a tail, which can be visibly seen in her in-game sprite. It is noted that she was not born a beast, but became one through unknown means.

Reisen Udongein Inaba's complex name reflects her background: "Reisen" (written in katakana) is her true name given to her by her former master Toyohime; "Udongein" (often shortened to "Udonge") is a nickname given by Eirin; and "Inaba" is an affectionate nickname given by Kaguya. Her design includes signature red eyes that manipulate various waves—including matter, spirit, electromagnetic, and sound—to induce madness, hallucinations, phase-shifting (becoming untouchable and unperceivable), muting nearby sounds, and enabling infinite-distance communication. This power is reflected visually in the game's distorted stage backgrounds during her boss fight.

Eirin Yagokoro's name contains a connection to the moon goddess Chang'e. In an interaction with another moon rabbit, Eirin introduces herself as "Yagokoro XX", noting that the true name of Chang'e is unpronounceable to earthlings. She had also previously made the Hourai Elixir for Chang'e.

Fujiwara no Mokou's design has evolved over her timeline; while she currently has long white hair and red eyes, historical depictions show her with short black hair and a different eye color. ZUN noted that he gave her the name "Mokou" with the meaning of "dye yourself red too." Finally, Tewi Inaba's spell cards heavily reference mythological lore, specifically the White Rabbit of Inaba and Okuninushi's medicine.

== Reception and derivative works ==
Writing for Gamasutra, Michael Molinari singled out an aspect of Imperishable Night's stage design for analysis: the stage two boss had a gimmick that limits the player's field of view and "bring[s] the most tension, excitement, exhilaration, etc., despite it simplifying the game and bringing me to the most primitive of mechanics (the process of movement)". He then goes on to say that the presentation and the mechanics of the bullet patterns not only make it possible for this to happen, but also make the gimmick "worthwhile and memorable".

The characters of Imperishable Night remain popular in the fanbase and frequently rank in character popularity polls. In 2024 polls conducted by Netorabo, Keine Kamishirasawa ranked 15th among voters in their 30s and 40s, and 21st among male voters. In a 2025 poll by Anime! Anime! asking readers for their favorite "medicine characters", Eirin Yagokoro ranked 9th overall.

The game's cast often features prominently in official spin-off games. Reisen Udongein Inaba was added as a playable fighter in the PlayStation 4 release of Urban Legend in Limbo; her addition featured a new story set after the events of Legacy of Lunatic Kingdom, which ZUN stated was "inevitable." In the smartphone RPG Touhou LostWord, Fujiwara no Mokou appears as a powerful high-risk, high-reward attacker who inflicts "Burn" anomalies on both enemies and herself. Her abilities consume her own HP to unleash devastating attacks, reflecting her immortal nature. In the rhythm game Touhou Danmaku Kagura, a visually popular card featuring Eirin and Kaguya references The Tale of the Bamboo Cutter with the quote "Why stay for so long in this impure place?". The artwork depicts Eirin taking a more dominant role, prompting fan speculation on their true master-servant dynamic. Dengeki Online also highlighted Tewi Inaba's mythological origins and power to bring good luck in a trivia column, jokingly suggesting her merchandise might bring good fortune despite her mischievous nature.

Numerous fan-made games also heavily feature the Imperishable Night cast. Touhou Mystia's Izakaya, a highly acclaimed restaurant management simulator developed by Dichromatic Lotus Butterfly, follows Mystia Lorelei attempting to rebuild her business after it was destroyed by a guest. Released on the Nintendo Switch in May 2024, its physical limited editions included merchandise such as tapestries and plates featuring Mystia in landlady attire. In the 2026 4X strategy game Empire of Gensokyo ~TOHOTOPIA, Kaguya Houraisan appears as a playable hero representing the "Houraisan Empire" and Napoleon of France. Another fan game, Touhou Age Chronicle: Twin Princesses of Hourai, features Eirin Yagokoro as a potent support and healer character utilizing dispel and resurrection abilities.

== Related media ==
Touhou Bōgetsushō (東方儚月抄) is an extension of the story in Imperishable Night, split into three parts, each carried by a different Ichijinsha magazine. The main component, Silent Sinner in Blue, is a manga serialized in the monthly Comic Rex; it is through Silent Sinner in Blue that the main plot progresses. Cage in Lunatic Runagate is a novel being serialized in the quarterly Chara Mel; it centers on the viewpoints of the characters around the story. Finally, The Inaba of the Moon and the Inaba of the Earth (月のイナバと地上の因幡, Tsuki no Inaba to Chijō no Inaba) is a lighthearted yonkoma focusing on Reisen and Tewi Inaba. The plot of Touhou Bōgetsushō overall revolves around the disturbances on the lunar capital, Yukari's plans to invade the moon, and Remilia's rocket trip to the moon.

Ichijinsha sought ZUN for this venture before he started to work on Mountain of Faith, and ZUN once had thoughts to make the manga about the upcoming game. However, as development of Mountain of Faith progressed, ZUN decided that he should base the story on something that Touhou Project fans were already familiar with. He turned to Imperishable Night because he felt the game did not provide much room for character development despite having such a rich cast. With the three-part media blitz, ZUN hoped to expand on the characters' inner thoughts.
