= Mountain of Faith =

2007 bullet hell video game

- Original CD-ROM cover with a silhouette of Kanako Yasaka.
- Developer: Team Shanghai Alice
- Publisher: Team Shanghai Alice
- Composer: Team Shanghai Alice
- Series: Touhou Project
- Platform: Windows
- Release: JP: 17 August 2007 (Note: Mountain of Faith was sold on the first day of Comiket 72.)
- Genre: Bullet hell (danmaku)
- Mode: Single-player

Touhou Fūjinroku ~ Mountain of Faith. (Japanese: 東方風神録 ～ Mountain of Faith.; lit. "Eastern Wind God Chronicles") is a 2007 bullet hell scrolling shooter developed by Team Shanghai Alice. It is the tenth main game in the Touhou Project, and the twelfth game overall. As with the other main Touhou Project games, Mountain of Faith is a vertically scrolling shooter. Mountain of Faith was released in the Comiket 72 in August 2007, and released on Steam in June 2020.

== Gameplay ==
Marisa fighting the Stage 4 midboss, Momiji Inubashiri.

Mountain of Faith is a vertically scrolling shoot 'em up game, in which the player is always facing upwards, and is required to maneuver around enemy projectiles, shooting enemies that appear from the top of the screen, and fighting bosses that appear twice in each stage.

Unlike previous Touhou games, the player's spell card ability is not given its own counter, but instead, upon activation, it will consume one point of the player's shot power, which has an upper limit of five points, but can be replenished by collecting power items from killed enemies.

Introduced in Mountain of Faith's scoring mechanics is the Faith system. The "faith counter", displayed at the lower-left corner of the screen, determines the number of points the player will receive by collecting point items and capturing enemy spell cards. The counter decreases as time progresses, but the decrease can be halted temporarily by defeating enemies and collecting point items. Additionally, the Faith Point item was introduced in Mountain of Faith, a green variant of the regular point item, which replenishes the player's faith.

In Mountain of Faith, players can set messages throughout the course of the game, which can be used for subsequent playthroughs. The feature can be set to auto, wherein the game automatically creates a warning in the specific locations that the player had died in previous playthroughs. The player can also edit the hint file to show personalized notes at certain places and times, allowing for the creation of strategy guides with "Nico Nico Douga-like interactivity". Mountain of Faith features two player characters, Reimu Hakurei and Marisa Kirisame, who each have three different shot types, but unlike previous games, they all share the same spell card.

== Plot ==
In autumn, the Hakurei Shrine, the only shrine located in Gensokyo, had a decrease in visitation by humans, causing a major decrease in faith. It is during this period that Reimu, the miko of the shrine, is visited by a stranger who claims to represent a god of mountains and orders her to permanently close down the shrine. Reimu refuses, as the Hakurei Shrine is important in maintaining the Great Hakurei Border, which separates Gensokyo from the Outside World. Marisa Kirisame, her magician friend, is suspicious and also suitably bored. The girls decide to ascend Youkai Mountain to confront the deity behind the threats.

Fighting lesser gods and a kappa, who warns them to turn back, Reimu and Marisa climb Youkai Mountain to find that the tengu society fretting over the presence of a new shrine on the mountain. Turning their attention to the new shrine, the Moriya Shrine on the mountain, the girls find Sanae Kotiya, the messenger who ordered them to shut down the Hakurei Shrine. Sanae is the priestess serving the god Kanako Yasaka, who plots to gather the faith of all of Gensokyo's denizens in order to prevent the faith from declining any further, which would result in gods losing their power. As it would make her shrine obsolete, Reimu battles Kanako, and, Kanako is convinced to make peace with the tengu and kappa, who are also convinced to accept her as the goddess of Youkai Mountain.

In the Extra Stage, Reimu and Marisa hear of a rumor that another god lives in the Moriya Shrine, and so set out for the mountain again. There they meet the true god of the Moriya Shrine, Suwako Moriya, who demands the girls to play with her.

ZUN stated in an interview that the plot of Mountain of Faith was never resolved in itself. This was so that future instalments like Subterranean Animism can base their stories on the loose ends created in Mountain of Faith.

== Characters ==
Top row: Shizuha, Minoriko, Hina Middle row: Nitori, Momiji, Aya Bottom row: Sanae, Kanako, Suwako

Playable characters:

- Reimu Hakurei (博麗 霊夢) – The miko of the Hakurei Shrine, who investigates the mountain after being ordered to close the Hakurei Shrine. Her three attacks modes are homing amulets, persuasion needles, and spread amulets
- Marisa Kirisame (霧雨 魔理沙) – An ordinary magician. After being informed of Reimu's situation, she investigated the mountain herself. Her attacks are trace and hold star fire, magical lasers and cold inferno vents.

Boss characters:

- Shizuha Aki (秋 静葉) – Stage one midboss, her attacks are themed on autumn leaves. Together with her sister Minoriko, they control the season of autumn.
- Minoriko Aki (秋 穣子) – Stage one boss and a goddess of harvest.
- Hina Kagiyama (鍵山 雛) – Stage two boss, the leader of dolls that are sent down rivers to take away bad luck. Thus Hina herself is surrounded by misfortune, which is reflected in the name of some of her spell cards.
- Nitori Kawashiro (河城 にとり) – Stage three boss, Nitori is a kappa engineer, whose stage reflects the aquatic nature of kappas. She believes the kappa and the humans were ancient allies, but she herself is shy, concealing herself with optical camouflage upon encountering humans.
- Momiji Inubashiri (犬走 椛) – Stage four midboss, a wolf who is closely connected to the tengu society. She only has one unnamed spell card. In-game, her name is spelled as "Momizi".
- Aya Syameimaru (射命丸 文) – Stage four boss, the tengu that is most familiar with the humans of Gensokyo due to her job as a newspaper reporter. She was sent by the tengu society to negotiate with the trespassing humans, Reimu and Marisa.
- Sanae Kochiya (東風谷 早苗) – Stage five boss, a human who originally was revered as a living god outside Gensokyo. She is the wind priestess of Moriya Shrine, and her attacks are modelled after miracles and winds. Her surname is sometimes spelled in kunrei-shiki as "Kotiya".
- Kanako Yasaka (八坂 神奈子) – Final stage boss and extra stage midboss, the goddess of Moriya Shrine, based on the Japanese deity Takeminakata and his consort Yasakatome, the gods of Suwa Shrine in Nagano Prefecture. Her attacks are based on the real-life Suwa Shrine's ceremonies and ritual items, such as the shimenawa and onbashira. She planned to move Moriya Shrine from the Outside World into Gensokyo to draw on its spiritual power.
- Suwako Moriya (洩矢 諏訪子) – Extra boss and the other, hidden goddess of Moriya Shrine who controls divine spirits known as Mishaguji. Based on Moreya, the native god of the Suwa region, her spell cards are characterised by frogs and Suwa mythology.

== Development ==
After the release of Imperishable Night, ZUN had achieved his original goal of making three Touhou games for Windows. Although he had thoughts to make the next game return to the simplistic nature of Embodiment of Scarlet Devil, he shelved the idea to work on spinoff games. From Embodiment of Scarlet Devil to Phantasmagoria of Flower View, ZUN created at least one Touhou game per year, but was not able to in 2006 because of his job at Taito, giving him insufficient time and energy to make a game. Additionally, ZUN did not expect that Touhou would have sufficient popularity to warrant another sequel, but was surprised to find that in the year 2006, its popularity continued to grow, prompting the development of Mountain of Faith.

The story of Mountain of Faith is based on Suwa myths familiar to ZUN from his youth, which he says have a nostalgic sentiment to him. Since Suwa mythology had largely faded from public consciousness, ZUN thought it would be interesting to provide his own spin on Suwa mythology. As preparation, he went on a trip to research the gods of the Suwa region.

A major part of Mountain of Faith's design philosophy was to return to a more basic gameplay formula. For this reason, Mountain of Faith did not inherit the Spell Practice mode from Imperishable Night nor the unique player spell cards from previous games. Using Shoot the Bullet as prototype, ZUN extended the spinoff game into Mountain of Faith, thus starting off from scratch instead of using the models of his well-established games. ZUN has stated that being able to revamp the game system and remove existing features freely is one of the advantages of doujin production.

On June 6, 2020, Mountain of Faith was released on Steam, alongside Subterranean Animism and Undefined Fantastic Object.

== Reception ==
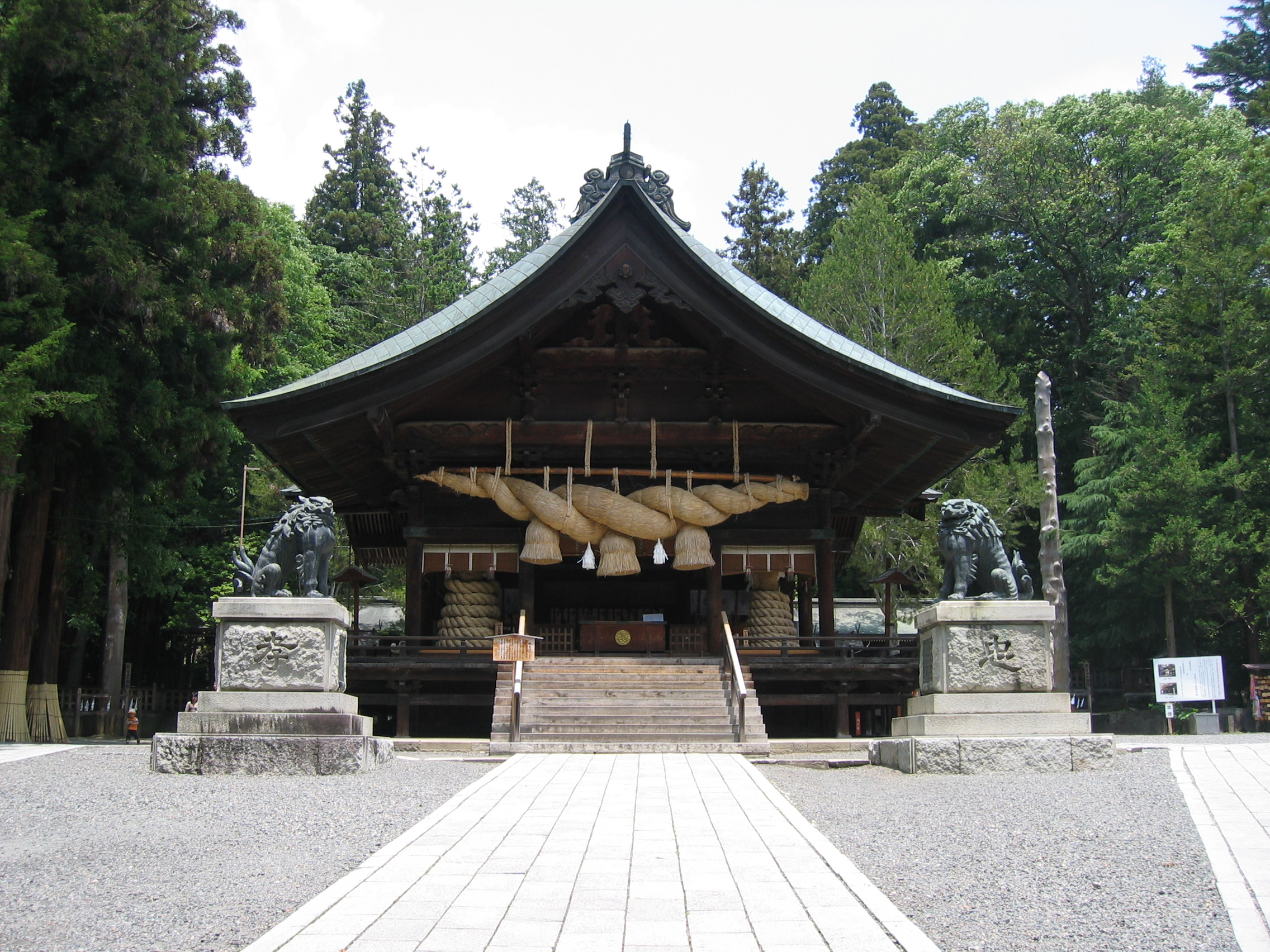
An image of the Akimiya Kaguraden in the Suwa Taisha was used as the background image during Kanako Yasaka's spell cards

As with other Touhou games, Mountain of Faith was lauded for its difficulty. However, Yukikuni Sasayama of 4Gamer.net noted that although the bullet patterns have become more difficult than past Touhou games, the durations of the patterns have become shorter, making it easier for players to outlast the patterns. Sasayama described the game as "spellcard-centric", with the game encouraging bombing throughout the stage until the player reaches the bosses, who can perform spell cards. Hence Mountain of Faith lets the players experience the rhythmic onslaught of spell cards, which may be the reason why Mountain of Faith did not inherit the Spell Practice mode from Imperishable Night, since it fragments the spell cards.

The popularity of Touhou Project brought many fans from outside of Nagano Prefecture to the shrines of Suwa, the place from which Mountain of Faith drew its inspiration. Prayer plaques with manga drawings starting to appear in the Suwa Taisha since July 2008 as a result of these "pilgrimages", a term used by otaku to describe tourism to places connected to anime and video games. The Jinchōkan Moriya Historical Museum (神長官守矢史料館) in Chino, Nagano reported that the number of visitors in 2008 rivaled that of 2007, when tourists were likewise drawn to Suwa because of the Taiga drama Fūrin Kazan. Some locals hoped that these developments would lead to new ways to attract tourists, such as with Washimiya, Saitama (featured in Lucky Star).
