= ZUN (video game developer) =

Japanese video game developer & composer (born 1977)

- ZUN at Anime Expo, 2016
- Born: Jun'ya Ōta (太田 順也); March 18, 1977 (age 49); Hakuba, Nagano Prefecture, Japan
- Other name: Hakurei Kannushi
- Education: Tokyo Denki University
- Occupations: Video game developer, writer, composer
- Notable work: Touhou Project
- Children: 2

Jun'ya Ōta (太田 順也, Ōta Jun'ya) (born March 18, 1977), known professionally as ZUN, is a Japanese independent video game developer and composer, known for creating the Touhou Project bullet hell shoot 'em up video game series through his one-man doujin group Team Shanghai Alice (上海アリス幻樂団, Shanhai Arisu Gengakudan; lit. "Shanghai Alice Fantasy Ensemble").

ZUN developed the first five Touhou games for the Japanese NEC PC-9800 computer series, with the first, Highly Responsive to Prayers, released in August 1997; the series' signature danmaku mechanics were introduced in the second game, Story of Eastern Wonderland (also 1997). The release of Embodiment of Scarlet Devil in August 2002 marked a shift to Microsoft Windows. Numerous sequels followed, including several spin-offs departing from the traditional bullet hell format. He has also collaborated with other circles to produce related print works and music albums.

His Touhou series has become more particularly notable as a prominent source of Japanese dōjin content, with the series spawning a vast amount of fan-made works such as artwork, music, print works, video games, and Internet memes. Because of this, it has gained a large cult following outside of Japan. In 2010, the Guinness World Records called Touhou "the most prolific fan-based shooter series" ever created. The popularity of the series and its derivative works has been attributed in part to the few restrictions placed by ZUN on the use of his content. ZUN is also known as the Hakurei Kannushi (博麗神主), which is also the name he uses for his Twitter account.

== Early and personal life ==
Jun'ya Ōta was born in Hakuba on March 18, 1977, and described himself as a "normal countryside kid." His first exposure to video games was when he was around five years old, when he played the Game & Watch and arcade games from Hakuba ski resorts. Later, his parents bought him a Family Computer and the Disk System add-on. He picked the pseudonym ZUN due to its similarity to his given name. ZUN claimed that SonSon, Super Mario Bros. and Street Fighter II were the games that left the greatest impression on him during this period. As ZUN was born shortly after his grandfather's death and his parents spent most their time working, ZUN was mostly raised by his grandmother, who was particularly strict, and heavily regulated the time he could spend playing video games.

In 2012, ZUN married a mobile game programmer.

ZUN likes to drink beer, and has said that he drinks at least once a day. He has created his own beer (sometimes called ZUN beer), and written reviews for beers in Comptiq. His favourite brand is Kirin.

== Career ==
ZUN's first interest in developing video games came during his high school years. ZUN was part of his school's orchestra club, and originally wanted to create music for video games. Around 2001, he applied to Comiket as a music group under the name of Shanghai Alice Ensemble, but was rejected.

His interest in creating music began in elementary school, when his parents gifted him an Electone as a birthday present. In junior high school, he played the trumpet in a brass band and began composing his own music.

ZUN attended Tokyo Denki University, where he majored in mathematics. He hoped to compose music for fighting games in college, since they were popular at the time due to Street Fighter II. As he did not know anybody else who was making games that he could put his music in, he made his own games for this purpose, which led to the first Touhou Project game, Highly Responsive to Prayers, being released in 1996 for the PC-98, developed under the generic circle name ZUN Soft and published by Amusement Makers, a student video game development club. The first game was originally intended as a practice in programming. The Touhou Project only became a shooting game series from the second game onwards, because the popularity of shooting games had revived due to RayForce and ZUN had long been a fan of such games. While most shoot 'em up games utilise a military or science fiction theme, ZUN wanted a game with a miko main character and a Shinto aesthetic, and started his own series with such. ZUN remarked how the general theme and direction of Touhou only started coming together in the sixth game, Embodiment of Scarlet Devil.

After the release of the fifth Touhou game Mystic Square, ZUN graduated from university and the series became inactive for four years. During this time, he worked at Taito as a game developer and also composed music for various games created by members of Amusement Makers. He got the position by showing his interviewer the Touhou games he had created, after which, he was hired immediately. During his career at Taito, ZUN helped work on Greatest Striker, Magic Pengel: The Quest for Color, Bujingai, Graffiti Kingdom and Exit, as well as some other games that were ultimately cancelled. During this period, he contributed soundtracks to several games developed by his junior classmates in Amusement Makers, notably the Seihou Project (西方Project, Seihō Purojekuto; lit. "Western Project"), a series of bullet hell games for Microsoft Windows by Shunsatsu sare do? (瞬殺サレ道？). The series was intended as a counterpart to the Touhou Project, featuring highly similar gameplay as well as cameo appearances by Reimu Hakurei, Marisa Kirisame, and Yuuka Kazami:

- Shuusou Gyoku (秋霜玉; lit. "Autumn Frost Orb", 2000) - part of the Seihou Project
- Torte Le Magic (トルテルマジック, Torute Ru Majikku; 2001) - a bullet hell game by Pietoro (ぴえとろ) based on the manga 10 Carat Torte!
- Kioh Gyoku (稀翁玉; lit. "Rare Venerable Orb", 2001) - part of the Seihou Project
- ZUN's Strange Works (その他の作品; lit. "Other Works", 2000–2001) - a collection of six MIDI tracks for the Roland SC-88 Pro, including unused music from Shuusou Gyoku

ZUN became focused on game development for Microsoft Windows, forming the one-man dōjin circle Team Shanghai Alice and self-publishing all subsequent games. According to ZUN, the Windows games represent a "clean slate" for the series canon, albeit with many carry-overs and references from the PC-98 era.

In 2007, he left his job at Taito to focus on the development of the Touhou Project. Later that year, ZUN provided programming for Uwabami Breakers (黄昏酒場, Tasogare Sakaba; lit. "Twilight Bar Room"), a beer-themed bullet hell game published by "The Drinking Party" (呑んべぇ会, Nonbe-ekai). However, he did not initially plan for Touhou to become his life work.

The Embodiment of Scarlet Devil brings things back to the starting point, by curbing the game systems that change the difficulty in obscure ways while at the same time pursuing the natural fun of dodging bullets.

— ZUN's blog (2002)

While the Touhou games were initially created as a passion project, ZUN found that they were very successful – the first games he sold were Highly Responsive to Prayers and its sequel, The Story of Eastern Wonderland, at the 1997 Comiket. He brought a combined total of 80 copies, and was surprised when he was able to sell all of them. After Touhou's PC-98 era, he changed the name of his circle to "Shanghai Alice". According to ZUN, this name was chosen to fit the overall theme of the Touhou Project. "Shanghai", to him, is a multicultural city where Western and Oriental styles meet, and "Alice" evokes a feminine or gothic lolita feeling. The Japanese name, "Fantasy Ensemble" (幻樂団 Gengakudan), stems from ZUN's unsuccessful attempt to register the group as a music circle for Comiket 61 in December 2001; he decided to keep the name while applying as a game circle for Comiket 62, where he would release Embodiment of Scarlet Devil. The game received critical acclaim upon release in 2002, and the series soon developed a substantial cult following. Numerous sequels followed, several spin-offs departing from the traditional shoot 'em up format. Touhou games were sold through Comiket until 2004, when the convention Reitaisai was founded. The same year, ZUN wrote Curiosities of Lotus Asia, short stories that appeared in various magazines, which were then put together in a 2010 anthology. This was the first of several pieces of in-universe Touhou literature. Silent Sinner in Blue, the first official Touhou manga, was published in 2007. Literature continues to be produced, with the latest being the on-going Cheating Detective Satori and Lotus Eaters. In 2025, ZUN released Fossilized Wonders, the 20th game in the series.

ZUN does all the graphics, music, and programming alone for the bullet hell games, with the exceptions of the portrait art in Fairy Wars, which was done by Makoto Hirasaka. The fighting games, Immaterial and Missing Power, Scarlet Weather Rhapsody, Touhou Hisōtensoku, Hopeless Masquerade, Urban Legend in Limbo, and Antinomy of Common Flowers, were dual efforts with Twilight Frontier, in which ZUN wrote the music and story, and Twilight Frontier created the art and gameplay. ZUN develops his games with Visual Studio, Adobe Photoshop, and Cubase, according to his interview in Bohemian Archive in Japanese Red. ZUN, for the most part, had acknowledged, appreciated, and even encouraged derivative Touhou works by imposing very few restrictions on the use of his works. The major restrictions are on unauthorized commercial distribution as opposed to dōjin, and the spoiling of endings; proper attribution to Team Shanghai Alice is a requirement; creators of derivative works are asked to refrain from crowdfunding their projects. ZUN stated himself that he did not want the Touhou Project series to be officially commercialized.

In interviews, ZUN often stated his intention to re-release Embodiment of Scarlet Devil on Steam, but due to compatibility issues with later Windows releases, the game would move at abnormally high speeds and render it unplayable without fan patches; ZUN stated that he was unable to fix the issue himself, as he had lost the game's source code, making a direct port impossible. In 2017, Hidden Star in Four Seasons became the first Touhou title to be listed on a worldwide digital storefront; by the release of Fossilized Wonders, every mainline Touhou game for Windows systems had been added to Steam with the notable exception of Embodiment of Scarlet Devil, Perfect Cherry Blossom, and Imperishable Night. These games had ranked consistently as the top three games of the series by the annual Touhou Popularity Poll; speculation led the fan community to believe the source code had been lost for not just Embodiment of Scarlet Devil, but all three missing games from the storefront.

On June 9, 2026, Touhou Koumakyou: New Classic ~ The Embodiment of Scarlet Devil, a remake of Embodiment of Scarlet Devil, was announced in the Japanese version of a Nintendo Direct. It was developed by Shanghai Alice Reprise, a new development team helmed by ZUN and senior developers such as such as Jyunya and Unabara of Twilight Frontier, "dedicated to making Touhou Project games playable on modern platforms". The team's mission is to "make Touhou Project games playable on modern platforms", which came as a result of Embodiment of Scarlet Devil being unable to be ported to Steam due to lost source code. It released for PC through Steam, as well as Nintendo Switch, Switch 2 and Playstation 5 on September 9, 2026.

Embodiment of Scarlet Devil: New Classic was translated into 11 different languages, making it the first time any mainline Touhou title has been localised outside of Japan; multiple members of the Touhou Patch Centre, previously involved in fan translation patches, were involved directly. New Classic features new enhanced visuals and redrawn sprites of the original game, a re-arranged soundtrack by ZUN, and an infinite lives mode, with an option to toggle to recreate the visuals and soundtrack of the 2002 original. Throughout the course of development, ZUN re-discovered a backup of the game's visual assets, which allowed for the inclusion of previously unseen full-body standing illustrations in the game.

== Design philosophy ==
ZUN has voiced criticism of the video game industry, saying that games have become easier and less mechanically complex when they try to appeal to a wider audience. However, he noted that the dojin game market has allowed for danmaku and other niche genres to still thrive.

ZUN works alone, and each mainline Touhou game was created from the ground up, including the engine. He collaborates with others for spinoff games such as the Touhou fighting games, the first of which was Immaterial and Missing Power, created in 2003 with dojin group Twilight Frontier. In the game's afterword, ZUN mentioned that he disliked having to manage other workers, and that he produced things "six times more comfortably" when doing so alone.

In the addendum of Unfinished Dream of All Living Ghost (2023), ZUN lauded the efficiency of generative artificial intelligence (AI) but remarked that "the beasts are the ones building a world of mental enrichment and a palpable sense of life". He referred to the case where the means by which artists create passionately their dojin works, which he calls AI's "opposing symbol of imperfection, organicity, and the importance of 'the process' ...", cannot be comparable to AI works. For the development of Fossilized Wonders, ZUN incorporated images generated by artificial intelligence into the game's background assets, a decision some Touhou fans criticized. However, he stated that his reason of using AI generated images had to do with the game's plot, and affirmed a negative stance against generative AI in art.

ZUN has acknowledged that while the Touhou characters have elaborate stories, little detail is given to them in-game, saying that "danmaku is how the story and characters are communicated." Additionally, he has claimed danmaku is meant to be beautiful and aesthetically pleasing, which is also the main reason why the majority of Touhou characters are female. ZUN believes there is a feminine charm to danmaku, which would be lost with male characters, and that the presence of female characters should not be interpreted as fan service.

Video game scholar Angelo Careri wrote that ZUN's musical style features fast melodies with elements of Japanese music and sequences of ornate arpeggiated strings, paired with fast-tempo or percussive rhythms, using low-fidelity virtual instruments dominated by piano and trumpet timbres.

== Games ==
=== As ZUN Soft ===
Title	Genre	System	Release date	Developer(s)	Ref(s)
Highly Responsive to Prayers Tōhō Reiiden (東方靈異伝; lit. "Wondrous Tale")	Block breaker	PC-98	August 15, 1997 (Comiket 52)	ZUN Soft Amusement Makers	
Story of Eastern Wonderland Tōhō Fūmaroku (東方封魔録; lit. "Demon-Sealing Record")	Shoot 'em up	PC-98	August 15, 1997 (Comiket 52)	ZUN Soft Amusement Makers	
Phantasmagoria of Dim. Dream Tōhō Yumejikū (東方夢時空; lit. "Dream Space-Time)	Shoot 'em up	PC-98	December 29, 1997 (Comiket 53)	ZUN Soft Amusement Makers	
Lotus Land Story Tōhō Gensōkyō (東方幻想郷; lit. "Fantasy Land")	Shoot 'em up	PC-98	August 14, 1998 (Comiket 54)	ZUN Soft Amusement Makers	
Mystic Square Tōhō Kaikidan (東方怪綺談; lit. "Bizarre Romantic Story")	Shoot 'em up	PC-98	December 30, 1998 (Comiket 55)	ZUN Soft Amusement Makers	

=== As Team Shanghai Alice ===
Title	Genre	System	Release date	Developer(s)	Ref(s)
Embodiment of Scarlet Devil Tōhō Kōmakyō (東方紅魔郷; lit. "Scarlet Devil Land")	Shoot 'em up	Microsoft Windows	August 11, 2002 (Comiket 62)	Team Shanghai Alice	
Perfect Cherry Blossom Tōhō Yōyōmu (東方妖々夢; lit. "Ghostly Dream")	Shoot 'em up	Microsoft Windows	August 17, 2003 (Comiket 64)	Team Shanghai Alice	
Imperishable Night Tōhō Eiyashō (東方永夜抄; lit. "Eternal Night Vignette")	Shoot 'em up	Microsoft Windows	August 15, 2004 (Comiket 66)	Team Shanghai Alice	
Immaterial and Missing Power Tōhō Suimusō (東方萃夢想; lit. "Gathering Reverie")	Fighting	Microsoft Windows	December 30, 2004 (Comiket 67)	Team Shanghai Alice Twilight Frontier	
Phantasmagoria of Flower View Tōhō Kaeizuka (東方花映塚; lit. "Flower Reflecting Mound")	Shoot 'em up	Microsoft Windows	August 14, 2005 (Comiket 68)	Team Shanghai Alice	
Shoot the Bullet Tōhō Bunkachō (東方文花帖; lit. "Word Flower Album")	Shoot 'em up	Microsoft Windows	December 30, 2005 (Comiket 69)	Team Shanghai Alice	
Mountain of Faith Tōhō Fūjinroku (東方風神録; lit. "Wind God Chronicles")	Shoot 'em up	Microsoft Windows	August 17, 2007 (Comiket 72)	Team Shanghai Alice	
Scarlet Weather Rhapsody Tōhō Hisōten (東方緋想天; lit. "Scarlet Perception Heaven")	Fighting	Microsoft Windows	May 25, 2008 (Reitaisai 5)	Team Shanghai Alice Twilight Frontier	
Subterranean Animism Tōhō Chireiden (東方地霊殿; lit. "Earth-Spirit Palace")	Shoot 'em up	Microsoft Windows	August 16, 2008 (Comiket 74)	Team Shanghai Alice	
Undefined Fantastic Object Tōhō Seirensen (東方星蓮船; lit. "Star-Lotus Ship")	Shoot 'em up	Microsoft Windows	August 15, 2009 (Comiket 76)	Team Shanghai Alice	
Touhou Hisoutensoku Tōhō Hisōtensoku ~ Chōdokyū Ginyoru no Nazo wo Oe (東方非想天則 〜 超弩級ギニョルの謎を追え; lit. "Unperceiving of Natural Law ~ Chase the Enigma of the Gargantuan Guignol")	Fighting	Microsoft Windows	August 15, 2009 (Comiket 76)	Team Shanghai Alice Twilight Frontier	
Double Spoiler Daburu Supoiraa ~ Tōhō Bunkachō (ダブルスポイラー 〜 東方文花帖; lit. "Word Flower Album")	Shoot 'em up	Microsoft Windows	March 14, 2010 (Reitaisai 7)	Team Shanghai Alice	
Fairy Wars Yōsei Daisensō ~ Tōhō Sangetsusei (妖精大戦争 〜 東方三月精; lit. "Great Fairy Wars ~ Three Fairies")	Shoot 'em up	Microsoft Windows	August 14, 2010 (Comiket 78)	Team Shanghai Alice	
Ten Desires Tōhō Shinreibyō (東方神霊廟; lit. "Divine Spirit Mausoleum")	Shoot 'em up	Microsoft Windows	August 13, 2011 (Comiket 80)	Team Shanghai Alice	
Hopeless Masquerade Tōhō Shinkirō (東方心綺楼; lit. "Heart Elegant Tower")	Fighting	Microsoft Windows	May 26, 2013 (Reitaisai 10)	Team Shanghai Alice Twilight Frontier	
Double Dealing Character Tōhō Kishinjō (東方輝針城; lit. "Shining Needle Castle")	Shoot 'em up	Microsoft Windows	August 12, 2013 (Comiket 84)	Team Shanghai Alice	
Impossible Spell Card Danmaku Amanojaku (弾幕アマノジャク; lit. "Bullet Curtain Amanojaku")	Shoot 'em up	Microsoft Windows	May 11, 2014 (Reitaisai 11)	Team Shanghai Alice	
Urban Legend in Limbo Tōhō Shinpiroku (東方深秘録; lit. "Deep Secret Record")	Fighting	Microsoft Windows	May 10, 2015 (Reitaisai 12)	Team Shanghai Alice Twilight Frontier	
Urban Legend in Limbo Tōhō Shinpiroku (東方深秘録; lit. "Deep Secret Record")	Fighting	PlayStation 4	JP: December 8, 2016	Team Shanghai Alice Twilight Frontier	
Legacy of Lunatic Kingdom Tōhō Kanjuden (東方紺珠伝; lit. "Ultramarine Orb Tale")	Shoot 'em up	Microsoft Windows	August 14, 2015 (Comiket 88)	Team Shanghai Alice	
Hidden Star in Four Seasons Tōhō Tenkūshō (東方天空璋; lit. "Heavenly Jade Dipper")	Shoot 'em up	Microsoft Windows	August 11, 2017 (Comiket 92)	Team Shanghai Alice	
Antinomy of Common Flowers Tōhō Hyōibana (東方憑依華; lit. "Spirit Possession Bloom")	Fighting	Microsoft Windows	December 29, 2017 (Comiket 93)	Team Shanghai Alice Twilight Frontier	
Antinomy of Common Flowers Tōhō Hyōibana (東方憑依華; lit. "Spirit Possession Bloom")	Fighting	PlayStation 4	April 22, 2021	Team Shanghai Alice Twilight Frontier	
Antinomy of Common Flowers Tōhō Hyōibana (東方憑依華; lit. "Spirit Possession Bloom")	Fighting	Nintendo Switch	April 22, 2021	Team Shanghai Alice Twilight Frontier	
Violet Detector Hifū Naitomea Daiarī (秘封ナイトメアダイアリ; lit. "Secret Sealing Nightmare Diary")	Shoot 'em up	Microsoft Windows	August 10, 2018 (Comiket 94)	Team Shanghai Alice	
Wily Beast and Weakest Creature Tōhō Kikeijū (東方鬼形獣; lit. "Oni-Shaped Beast")	Shoot 'em up	Microsoft Windows	August 12, 2019 (Comiket 96)	Team Shanghai Alice	
Sunken Fossil World Tōhō Gōyoku Ibun ~ Suibotsushita Chinshū Jigoku (東方剛欲異聞 ～ 水没した沈愁地獄; lit. "Strange Tale of Advice ~ Submerged Hell of Sunken Sorrow")	Bullet hell and platformer	Microsoft Windows	October 24, 2021	Team Shanghai Alice Twilight Frontier	
Unconnected Marketeers Tōhō Kōryūdō (東方虹龍洞; lit. "Rainbow Dragon Cave")	Shoot 'em up	Microsoft Windows	May 4, 2021	Team Shanghai Alice	
100th Black Market Barettofiriatachi no Yamishijō (バレットフィリア達の闇市場; lit. "Bulletphiles' Black Market")	Shoot 'em up	Microsoft Windows	August 14, 2022 (Comiket 100)	Team Shanghai Alice	
Unfinished Dream of All Living Ghost Tōhō Jūōen (東方獣王園; lit. "Beast King Garden")	Shoot 'em up	Microsoft Windows	August 13, 2023	Team Shanghai Alice	
Fossilized Wonders Tōhō Kinjōkyō (東方錦上京; lit. "Crowning Glory Capital")	Shoot 'em up	Microsoft Windows	August 17, 2025	Team Shanghai Alice	

=== As Shanghai Alice Reprise ===
Title	Genre	System	Release date	Developer(s)	Ref(s)
New Classic ~ The Embodiment of Scarlet Devil Tōhō Kōmakyō: New Classic (東方紅魔郷; lit. "Scarlet Devil Land: New Classic")	Shoot 'em up	Microsoft Windows, Nintendo Switch, Nintendo Switch 2, Playstation 5	September 10, 2026	Shanghai Alice Reprise	

== Music CDs ==
=== ZUN's Music Collection ===
- Dolls in Pseudo Paradise (蓬莱人形, Hōrai Ningyō; lit. "Hourai Doll"; 2002-12-30)
- Ghostly Field Club (蓮台野夜行, Rendaino Yakō; lit. "Night Trip to Rendaino"; 2003-12-30)
- Changeability of Strange Dream (夢違科学世紀, Yumetagae Kagaku Seiki; lit. "Changing Dreams in the Age of Science"; 2004-12-30)
- Retrospective 53 minutes (卯酉東海道, Bōyu Tōkaidō; lit. "East-West Tōkaidō"; 2006-05-21)
- Magical Astronomy (大空魔術, Ōzora Majutsu; lit. "Celestial Wizardry"; 2006-08-13)
- Unknown Flower, Mesmerizing Journey (未知の花 魅知の旅, Michi no Hana, Michi no Tabi; 2011-05-08)
- Trojan Green Asteroid (鳥船遺跡, Torifune Iseki; lit. "Ruins of Torifune"; 2012-04-30)
- Neo-traditionalism of Japan (伊弉諾物質, Izanagi Busshitsu; lit. "Izanagi Object"; 2012-08-11)
- Dr. Latency's Freak Report (燕石博物誌, Enseki Hakubutsushi; lit. "Swallowstone Naturalis Historia"; 2016-05-08)
- Dateless Bar "Old Adam" (旧約酒場, Kyūyaku Sakaba; lit. "Old Testament Tavern"; 2016-08-13)
- Rainbow-Colored Septentrion (虹色のセプテントリオン, Nijiiro no Seputentorion; 2021-12-31)
- Taboo Japan Disentanglement (七夕坂夢幻能, Tanabatazaka Mugen Nou; lit. "Mugen Noh of Tanabata Hill"; 2024-05-03)
- Artificial Utopia in Ruins (霊長新益京 Reichou Aramashi-kyou; lit. '"Primate Spirit Aramashi-kyō"'; 2026-08-15)

=== Akyu's Untouched Score ===
- Akyu's Untouched Score vol.1 (幺樂団の歴史１, Yōgakudan no Rekishi 1; lit. "History of Yougakudan 1"; 2006-05-21)
- Akyu's Untouched Score vol.2 (幺樂団の歴史２, Yōgakudan no Rekishi 2; lit. "History of Yougakudan 2"; 2006-12-31)
- Akyu's Untouched Score vol.3 (幺樂団の歴史３, Yōgakudan no Rekishi 3; lit. "History of Yougakudan 3"; 2006-12-31)
- Akyu's Untouched Score vol.4 (幺樂団の歴史４, Yōgakudan no Rekishi 4; lit. "History of Yougakudan 4"; 2007-12-31)
- Akyu's Untouched Score vol.5 (幺樂団の歴史５, Yōgakudan no Rekishi 5; lit. "History of Yougakudan 5"; 2007-12-31)

=== Collaborations with Twilight Frontier ===
- Immaterial and Missing Power OST (幻想曲抜萃, Gensōkyoku Bassui; lit. "Collection of Illusionary Music"; 2005-08-14)
- Scarlet Weather Rhapsody OST (全人類ノ天楽録, Zenjinrui no Tengakuroku Tōhō Hisōten; lit. "Celestial Music Record of All Humankind"; 2008-08-16)
- Touhou Hisoutensoku OST (核熱造神ヒソウテンソク, Kakunetsuzōshin Hisōtensoku; lit. "Thermonuclear Titan Hisoutensoku"; 2009-12-30)
- Hopeless Masquerade OST (暗黒能楽集・心綺楼, Ankoku Nōgakushū; lit. "Dark Noh Collection"; 2013-08-12)
- Urban Legend in Limbo OST (深秘的楽曲集 宇佐見菫子と秘密の部室, Shinpiteki Gakkyokushū ~ Usami Sumireko to Himitsu no Bushitsu; lit. "A Deeply Mystic Music Collection ~ Sumireko Usami and the Clubroom of Secrets"; 2015-08-14)
- Urban Legend in Limbo OST 2 (深秘的楽曲集・補 東方深秘録初回特典CD, Shinpiteki Gakkyokushū - Ho ~ Tōhō Shinpiroku Shokai Tokuten CD; lit. "A Deeply Mystic Music Collection Supplement ~ Touhou Shinpiroku First Pressing Special CD"; 2016-12-08)
- Antimony of Common Flowers OST (完全憑依ディスコグラフィ, Kanzenhyōi Disukogurafi; lit. "Perfect Possession Discography"; 2018-05-06)
