= Embodiment of Scarlet Devil =

2002 video game

Touhou Koumakyou ~ the Embodiment of Scarlet Devil
- CD-ROM cover art, featuring a silhouette of Flandre Scarlet
- Developers: Team Shanghai Alice (Note: Ponchi, a member of the Seihou Project development team "Shunsatsu sare do?", is additionally credited as "Program Support".); Shanghai Alice Reprise (Note: For the remake Touhou Koumakyou: New Classic - the Embodiment of Scarlet Devil.)
- Publishers: Team Shanghai Alice; Alliance Arts
- Programmer: ZUN
- Composer: ZUN
- Series: Touhou Project
- Platform: Windows
- Release: August 11, 2002: Original (Windows): JP: August 11, 2002; New Classic (Windows, Nintendo Switch, Nintendo Switch 2, PlayStation 5); WW: September 10, 2026
- Genres: Scrolling shooter, bullet hell
- Mode: Single-player

Touhou Koumakyou ~ the Embodiment of Scarlet Devil (Japanese: 東方紅魔郷 ～ the Embodiment of Scarlet Devil., Hepburn: Tōhō Kōmakyō; lit. 'Eastern Lands of the Scarlet Devil') is a 2002 bullet hell video game developed by Team Shanghai Alice. It is the sixth entry in the Touhou Project series, and the first to be released for Microsoft Windows. It follows either the miko Reimu Hakurei or the magician Marisa Kirisame as they battle enemies through the world of Gensokyo to find the cause of a red-colored mist which has covered the sky in the midst of summer.

ZUN, the creator of the Touhou Project, had planned to end the series after the release of Mystic Square in 1998. After graduating, ZUN started work at Taito as a game developer and composed music for games created by Amusement Makers, publishers of the original five Touhou Project games released for the aging PC-98 computer. Leaving Amusement Makers in 2001 but remaining at Taito, he formed the doujin circle Team Shanghai Alice as its sole member, initially applying as a music circle to the 61st Comiket. After being denied, ZUN instead decided to develop a full game to submit at Comiket 62, reviving the Touhou Project series. The jump from PC-98 to Windows represented a "clean slate" for both the series and its developer, and Embodiment of Scarlet Devil served as a soft reboot of the series.

Embodiment of Scarlet Devil was released on 11 August 2002 to positive reviews but low sales, being sold for one day at a single Comiket booth. Over the next few months, ZUN would start to open mail orders online; it soon became a commercial success and earned the Touhou Project a substantial cult following, being followed by numerous sequels starting with Perfect Cherry Blossom in 2003. At Comiket 63, four months after release, there was a single derivative circle dedicated to the Touhou Project; this number would grow to 2,372 circles seven years later, breaking the convention's record. The series' move to Windows allowed for Embodiment of Scarlet Devil to reach a much wider audience than previous installments, having been given retrospective praise for its characters and soundtrack.

A remake was announced on June 9, 2026 under the title Touhou Koumakyou: New Classic - the Embodiment of Scarlet Devil. It was developed by Shanghai Alice Reprise and published by Alliance Arts, and released for Steam, Nintendo Switch and Nintendo Switch 2, and PlayStation 5 on September 10, 2026, with support for eleven different languages, including Japanese and English.

== Gameplay ==
An example of gameplay in Embodiment of Scarlet Devil, illustrating the game's basic mechanics

Embodiment of Scarlet Devil is a vertically scrolling shooter. The game offers two playable characters to choose from, each having two distinct shot types with unique sub-weapons and bombs. Reimu A utilizes "Homing Amulets" that automatically track off-axis enemies alongside the "Fantasy Seal" (Musō Fūin) bomb, which excels at clearing basic enemies, while Reimu B pairs straight-firing "Persuasion Needles" with the "Evil-Sealing Circle" (Fūmarin) bomb, offering a highly balanced and defensive playstyle. On the other hand, Marisa A uses "Magic Missiles" and the "Stardust Reverie" bomb, providing concentrated power against bosses but limited screen coverage, while Marisa B features the penetrating "Illusion Laser" and the highly destructive "Master Spark" bomb. The player can enter "Focus Mode", which slows the player character to allow for more precision when dodging projectiles. Embodiment of Scarlet Devil is the last game in the series that does not show the player's hitbox while in Focus Mode—this is remedied in Perfect Cherry Blossom. The player has the option to use bombs, which will grant temporary invulnerability, clear the screen of enemy bullets and deal immense damage; however, bombs come in limited supply, meaning they must be used cautiously. Bombs act differently depending on the character and shot type chosen. If the player is hit by an enemy bullet and uses a bomb within a six frame window, they can avoid losing their current life. Unique to Embodiment of Scarlet Devil, the amount of time in which a player can perform this technique is decreased each time it is done successfully until the player loses a life.

Bosses and minibosses appear at the end and middle of stages, respectively. Embodiment of Scarlet Devil is the first entry in the series to utilize the "Spell Card" system. Each boss in the game possesses various attack phases denoted by a named spell card which change elements of the game: examples are changing projectile types and stopping the player's control temporarily. These represented by multiple lifebars in contrast to the previous games having just one lifebar for each boss's various phases. They are used in a specific order; depending on the chosen difficulty and chosen shot type, certain Spell Cards are swapped for completely different ones or skipped altogether. Each Spell Card has its own countdown timer: clearing it before time runs out will grant a point bonus, and a further bonus, a 'capture', is given if they are completed without any lives lost or bombs used; timing out will cause the boss to switch to its next attack with no bonus given. There are 64 Spell Cards in total, and they can be viewed in the "Score" menu once the player has encountered them.

Points can be acquired in various ways. The "Graze" system grants the player 500 points for each bullet they narrowly avoid. Shooting enemies and collecting point and power items that they drop on defeat will also increase the number of points, with point items being worth more if collected higher. Power items increase the player's shot power, giving it a larger cone of fire and potential for dealing more damage to enemies at specific values, and when at the maximum power of 128, the player can move to the top of the screen to collect all on-screen items at once. Reaching specific score values will grant the player extra lives. When enemy bullets are erased, whether by boss pattern ending or the player bombing, they are turned into star items that grant further score. The amount of lives and bombs the player starts with can be chosen in the options menu – the default for each is three, and starting with more lives will apply a negative multiplier to the player's score. A "Play Rank" system also exists, which makes the game slightly easier if the player loses a life, and slightly harder if they score more points.

The game features six stages and four levels of difficulty. Easy difficulty prematurely ends the game after stage five with the game's bad ending, a decision that at the time was made due to assumption that the game would be played mostly by pre-existing shooter fans. Depending on difficulty, a positive or negative multiplier bonus is applied and given at the end of each stage. As with previous games in the series, an additional "Extra Stage" is unlocked in the main menu if the player completes the game without using a continue. (Note: Continuing on any difficulty will automatically grant the player the bad ending on completion, preventing this unlock. The "Extra Stage" prevents continuing.)

== Plot ==
=== Setting and prologue ===
The Touhou Project is set in Gensokyo, (Note: Japanese: 幻想郷, Hepburn: Gensōkyō; literally "Land of Illusions" or "Land of Fantasy") a region sealed from the outside human world and primarily inhabited by anthropomorphic yōkai alongside a small number of humans. One of them is Reimu Hakurei, the miko of the Hakurei Shrine. The main protagonist of the series, she is generally tasked with resolving supernatural "incidents" caused in and around Gensokyo. Marisa Kirisame, the other main playable character of the series, is a smug human who has become a magician through sheer hard work and prioritizes self-interest and her own kleptomania over the interests of others. The player chooses either to play as Reimu or Marisa, who each have separate scenarios.

In the summer of the game's events, the sky over Gensokyo becomes covered in a thick scarlet mist. This event, later revealed to be known as the Scarlet Mist Incident (紅霧異変), blocks out the sun, causing the temperature to drop and making the environment cold and dark. The mist is toxic to humans, forcing them to stay inside their homes for safety. Reimu becomes determined to find the cause of the mist to prevent it from spreading to the human world, while Marisa sets out hoping the person responsible possesses valuable items to collect.

=== Main scenario ===
The heroine traces the mist to its source at the Misty Lake (霧の湖). Here, she encounters Rumia (ルーミア), a yōkai with the ability to manipulate darkness, who they encounter by chance because of Rumia's habit of flying and wandering all day. She appears as a first boss due to her greatest weakness of blinding herself in her own darkness, and is additionally weakened by a red, ribbon-like amulet on her head that she is unable to remove herself Proceeding to the lake itself, the heroine faces the area's guardians, Daiyousei (大妖精, lit. "Great Fairy") and Cirno (チルノ), an ice fairy (Note: In Cirno's appearances in Embodiment of Scarlet Devil and Perfect Cherry Blossom, the games' character profiles refer to her as 精 (fairy/spirit) and yōkai, respectively, with the term used in the Touhou Project for fairies (妖精) only being applied to her starting with Phantasmagoria of Flower View.) who freezes water and attacks with cold projectiles.

The protagonist arrives at the Scarlet Devil Mansion (紅魔館), the source of the mist. Guarding the gates is Hong Meiling (紅 美鈴), a yōkai wearing traditional Chinese martial arts attire and mainly specializes in martial arts for combat. After defeating her, the heroine enters the mansion's underground library, defeating custodian Koakuma (小悪魔, lit. "Little Devil") before confronting the librarian Patchouli Knowledge (パチュリー・ノーレッジ), an asthmatic magician who has lived for over 100 years and commands powerful elemental magic based on the Wuxing, as well as the sun and moon.

As the heroine approaches the mistress's quarters, she is stopped by the head maid, Sakuya Izayoi (十六夜 咲夜), who manages the household and possesses the ability to manipulate time and space, allowing her to freeze time and throw innumerable knives. The reason why Sakuya is in the mansion in the first place is unclear, but later materials supposed the possibility of her being a vampire hunter.

The heroine then confronts the lord of the mansion, Remilia Scarlet (レミリア・スカーレット), a vampire who has lived for over 500 years and whose main ability is to manipulate fate,, although later works cast doubt on whether this ability is real or if it is just future predictions. Remilia reveals she created the dense mist to block the sunlight, allowing her to move freely during the day. Upon her defeat, the mist clears, and Remilia compromises by using a parasol to shield herself from the sun.

=== Extra scenario ===
A few days after the incident, Remilia visits the Hakurei Shrine. However, a harsh rainstorm begins to brew around the mansion, preventing her return. Remilia realizes that Patchouli has cast the storm to prevent Remilia's younger sister, Flandre Scarlet (フランドール・スカーレット), from escaping.

The heroine returns to the mansion and discovers Flandre in the basement, who is revealed to be a vampire with unique wings that glow in seven colors. Flandre claims to have been confined there for 495 years due to her emotional instability and her terrifying ability to destroy anything she wishes. However, written works later clarified that Flandre was not actually confined but simply preferred to stay in dark places. They have a quick dialogue where they mainly talk about Flandre's deep respect for her older sister, before challenging the heroine to a battle; upon her defeat, Reimu promises a future rematch, while Marisa taunts her with quotes from the poem Ten Little Indians.

== Development ==
=== Background ===
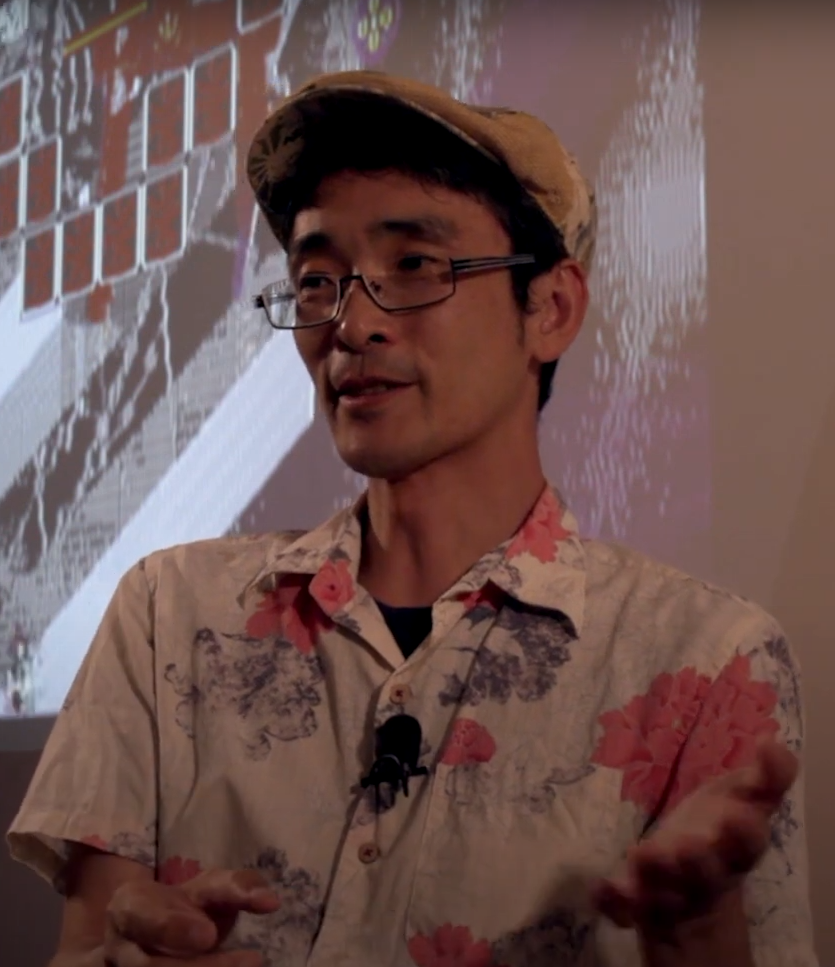
ZUN in 2016

After the release of the previous Touhou Project game, Mystic Square in late 1998, ZUN, creator and developer of the series, graduated from university. Mystic Square was intended to be the final Touhou Project installment with ZUN "sealing" his doujin activities – he had originally planned to stop with Lotus Land Story. He would go on to work at Taito as a game developer, and also composed music for various games created by members of Amusement Makers, the publishers of the previous five Touhou Project games, like the Seihou Project. ZUN left Amusement Makers in 2001, but continued to work at Taito until 2007, meaning each Touhou Project game until Mountain of Faith was developed concurrently with ZUN's work at Taito, which include Magic Pengel: The Quest for Color, Bujingai, Graffiti Kingdom and Exit, as well as other games that were ultimately cancelled. ZUN would reenter doujin activities by establishing his own doujin circle, changing his developer team name from "ZUN Soft" to Team Shanghai Alice, although initially the circle was not meant to develop games. ZUN applied to Comiket 61 under the name as a music circle, but was rejected. ZUN would instead decide to develop a game before the next Comiket, reviving the Touhou Project series. An announcement was then made on ZUN's blog promoting the game.

The game was initially developed under the title Touhou Kouchakan (東方紅茶館, lit. "Eastern Tea House"). A track composed for this early version, "Shanghai Kouchakan ~ Chinese Tea," was kept in the final release, though the game's title was eventually changed to Touhou Koumakyou as the story concepts solidified.

=== Conception and design ===
The Embodiment of Scarlet Devil brings things back to the starting point, by curbing the game systems that change the difficulty in obscure ways while at the same time pursuing the natural fun of dodging bullets.

— ZUN's blog (2002)

As PC-98 usage in Japan declined in comparison to Microsoft's Windows architecture around the late 1990s, Embodiment of Scarlet Devil marked the first time ZUN programmed a Windows application from scratch. As ZUN was more familiar with APIs and DirectX and was relatively unfamiliar with the application level, he spent considerable time creating libraries and tools for the game. Some libraries were borrowed from the Seihou Project; Ponchi, a member of the Seihou Project's development team, is thus given a credit as "Program Support". As a result, little time remained to improve the game's presentation, and ZUN resolved to focus on improving the next game. The game engine developed for Embodiment of Scarlet Devil would later be reused for the games Perfect Cherry Blossom and Imperishable Night. In 2013, ZUN stated fragments of code from the game were still being reused in Double Dealing Character.

As Embodiment of Scarlet Devil would be the first release of Team Shanghai Alice and their first game created for a wider audience, ZUN felt that the game would need to leave an impression. This resulted in the game's Western theme, unlike most other games in the Touhou Project which feature predominantly Asian themes. This also allowed the game's plot to be contained within its own narrative – Embodiment of Scarlet Devil does not mention or feature any PC-98 era characters bar Reimu and Marisa. Now regarding his past works as juvenilia, the jump from PC-98 to Windows represented a "clean slate" for both ZUN and the series: Embodiment of Scarlet Devil essentially serves as a soft reboot. ZUN has since remarked how the general theme and direction of the Touhou Project only started to come together during the development of Embodiment of Scarlet Devil. Some references are used from other material, mainly from the 1939 Agatha Christie mystery novel And Then There Were None for symbolism and dialogue in the game.

ZUN's general goal for Embodiment of Scarlet Devil was to avoid over-complication, and to let the player have fun simply dodging bullets. The Spell Card system was created by ZUN in 1999 while working on the Seihou Project, and was intended to be a means to identify bullet patterns with names as well as adding depth to his characters. ZUN further stated that Embodiment of Scarlet Devil itself was created for the purpose of introducing this system, and it has been featured in every game after. ZUN also had interest during development in making a bullet hell game in which the player could switch between two characters easily during gameplay, as he believed there were few games that incorporated such a system. He would ultimately decide against this, believing that having playable characters who had not been previously introduced would be unnatural, and so this system was reserved until Imperishable Night, when he had determined enough characters had been introduced to the series. A demo version containing the first three stages was also distributed online on June 10, 2002. A third playable character was planned for the game, but was scrapped due to time constraints, with only development leftovers being two text strings hidden in the game's executable file located next to the existing shot types.

The game's characters were designed to fit the Western theme while maintaining specific gameplay roles. ZUN designed the stage one boss, Rumia, to be the weakest boss in the game, intending for her "strong-sounding" ability to manipulate darkness to serve as an opening "punchline." Similarly, the final boss having a more child-like personality was meant to contrast with vampires being depicted as long-lived creatures, although in 2016 ZUN would note that characters similar to Remilia have appeared in other media since the game's release, making her less unique. Several characters draw inspiration from other media. The head maid Sakuya Izayoi was heavily inspired by the character Dio Brando from the manga JoJo's Bizarre Adventure, specifically his time-stopping abilities and knife-throwing attacks. Flandre Scarlet's dialogue, the name of the penultimate Spell Card "And Then Will There Be None?", and her theme song, "U.N. Owen Was Her?", reference the 1939 Agatha Christie mystery novel And Then There Were None.

=== Music ===
"U.N. Owen Was Her?"
"U.N. Owen Was Her?" features sharp arpeggio patterns and unconventional time signatures. This audio sample contains the song's intro.
ZUN's comments on the song imply it was his favorite during the development of the game.

The game's soundtrack was originally composed for the Roland SC-88 Pro sound module; ZUN decided to arrange and re-record the soundtrack in WAV format using a Roland Edirol SD-90 he had recently purchased, just before the game was released. As a result, two versions of the soundtrack exist; however the original MIDI files will only play correctly on an SC-88 Pro, meaning the WAV version of the soundtrack is by far the most recognised.

The game's primary menu features an interactive "Music Room" carried over from the series' PC-98 roots, featuring written commentary where he details his musical compositions, design moods, and personal trivia regarding the characters associated with each track. ZUN has stated he was aiming to give the game's music a "brighter" feel over prior instalments by attempting to add jazz-fusion elements to the soundtrack, and that Remilia Scarlet's theme "Septette for the Dead Princess" and Flandre Scarlet's theme "U.N. Owen Was Her?" were the songs he most thought of as representative of the game. "Septette for the Dead Princess" is a homage to Maurice Ravel's Pavane for a Dead Princess. The name of "U.N. Owen Was Her?" is taken from "U. N. Owen," a pseudonym used in Agatha Christie's novel And Then There Were None. Quotes and references from the book are also used in Marisa's dialogue. ZUN also has stated that the version of "Shanghai Alice in Meiji 17" in the game is actually an arrangement of the one found in Dolls in Pseudo Paradise. In August 2021, the game's soundtrack was released on Spotify along with all later games in the series.

== Remake ==
Comparison of graphics from the original release (top) and New Classic (bottom)

In interviews, ZUN often stated his intention to re-release Embodiment of Scarlet Devil on Steam, but due to compatibility issues with later Windows releases, the game would move at abnormally high speeds and render it unplayable without fan patches; ZUN stated that he was unable to fix the issue himself, as he had lost the game's source code, making a direct port impossible. In 2017, Hidden Star in Four Seasons became the first Touhou Project title to be listed on a worldwide digital storefront; by the release of Fossilized Wonders, every mainline Touhou Project game for Windows had been added to Steam with the notable exception of Embodiment of Scarlet Devil, Perfect Cherry Blossom, and Imperishable Night. These games had ranked consistently as the top three games of the series by the annual "Touhou Popularity Poll"; speculation led the fan community to believe the source code had been lost for not just Embodiment of Scarlet Devil, but all three missing games from the storefront.

On June 9, 2026, Touhou Koumakyou: New Classic - the Embodiment of Scarlet Devil, a remake of Embodiment of Scarlet Devil, was announced in the Japanese version of a Nintendo Direct. The remake was developed by Shanghai Alice Reprise, a new development team headed by ZUN and senior developers "dedicated to making Touhou Project games playable on modern platforms". It was released for PC (via Steam), Nintendo Switch and Switch 2, and PlayStation 5 on September 10 (JST), 2026.

New Classic includes translations into 12 different languages, making it the first time any mainline Touhou Project title has been localised outside of Japan; multiple members of the Touhou Patch Centre, previously involved in fan translation patches, were involved directly. New Classic features new enhanced visuals and redrawn sprites of the original game, a re-arranged soundtrack by ZUN, and an infinite lives mode. Classic, packaged free with the release, is a faithful recreation of the exact visuals and soundtrack of the 2002 original. (Note: Internally, the game is specified as v1.03 of the 2002 Embodiment of Scarlet Devil release.) Throughout the course of development, ZUN re-discovered a backup of the game's visual assets, which allowed for the inclusion of previously unseen full-body standing illustrations in the game.

The new development team, Shanghai Alice Reprise, is represented by JYUNYA of the doujin group AQUA STYLE, with ZUN participating directly as a member. Designed as an upgrade to make the original game compatible with modern hardware, the remake supports 1080p high-definition graphics. It also incorporates several visual quality-of-life additions introduced in later mainline entries, including a visible indicator showing the boss's location at the bottom of the screen and a clearly displayed player hitbox. It has two editions: standard, priced at ¥1,990, and deluxe, priced at ¥2,966 and including additional digital soundtracks and sound player.

New Classic will be released physically on Nintendo Switch and Nintendo Switch 2 in Japan on December 17, 2026, priced at ¥4,400 and ¥5,610 respectively. This will be the first time a mainline Touhou game is released physically for a console.

== Reception and legacy ==
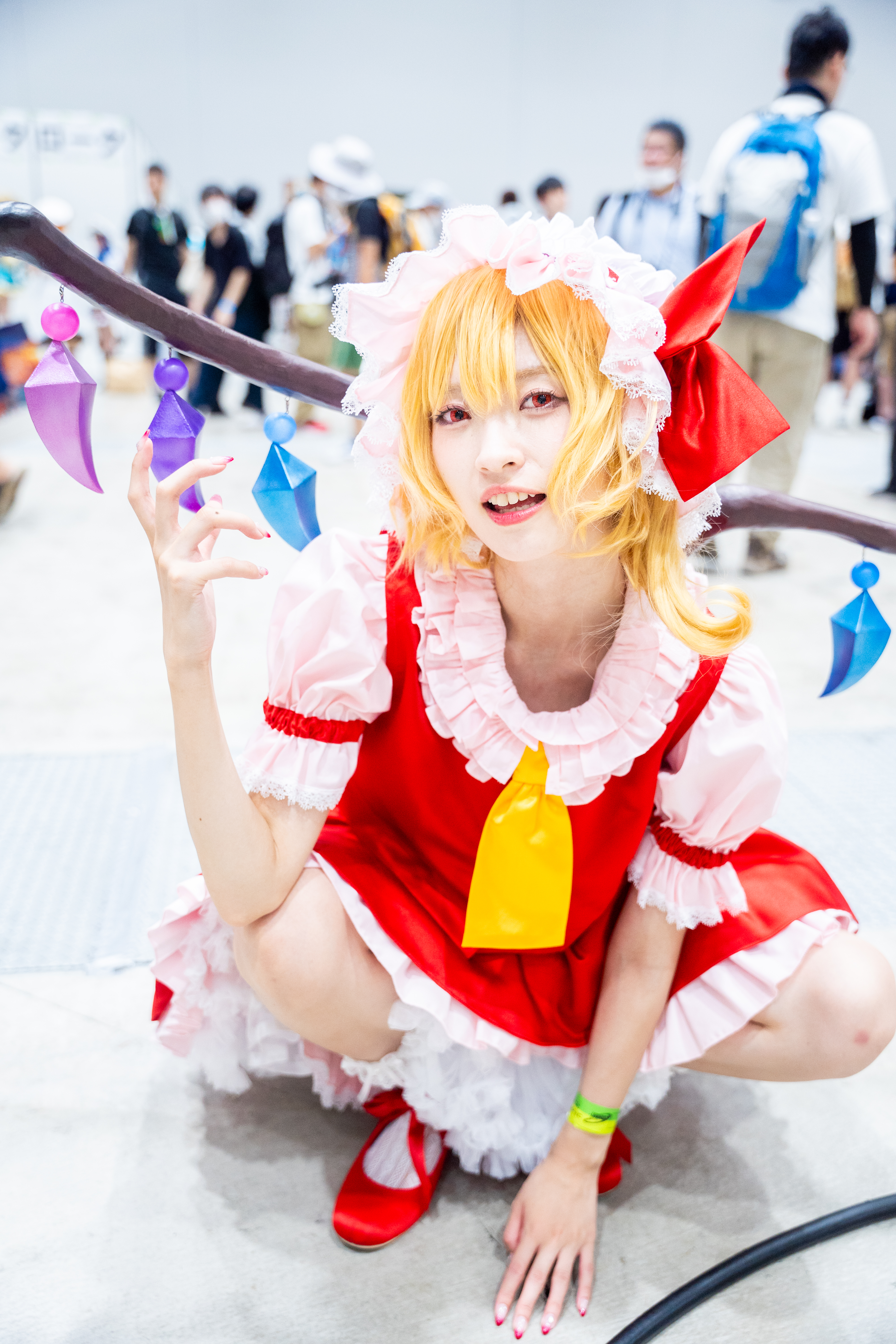
Cosplay of Flandre Scarlet at Comiket 102

Upon release at Comiket 62, Embodiment of Scarlet Devil sold considerably better than previous entries in the series, with ZUN partially crediting its success to the blog of Nobuya Narita of Watanabe Production. Because of this, initial circulation of the game was limited, later being sold through online CD retailers, though ZUN noted in 2005 that at first he did not want to sell the game via retail stores, only to be surprised that when he did, the game copies ended up being sold out. In a 2018 retrospective review of the game, IGN Japan's Shin Amai named Embodiment of Scarlet Devil the best game of 2002, calling the bullet hell mechanics mediocre, but that the level design, music, and presentation's charm made the game a "masterpiece" that would go on to become one of the most popular Japanese games of all time. In 2013, ZUN stated that Embodiment of Scarlet Devil was the overall best-selling Touhou Project game. Until 2026, the game had not been officially released in a language other than Japanese, but fan translation patches for the game have been created. At one point, ZUN stated that he has more faith in his fans to handle localization than a third-party company.

Embodiment of Scarlet Devil has become well-known for its music. Cirno's boss theme "Beloved Tomboyish Girl" was later remixed by doujin group IOSYS into "Cirno's Perfect Math Class" in 2008, a song which ridiculed the apparently unintelligent nature of the character and specifically referencing how in easy mode, one of Cirno's attack patterns does not ever attack directly in front, leading to her becoming an Internet meme. Flandre's boss theme "U.N. Owen Was Her?" is notable for creating an Internet meme and spreading the popularity of the series in the West. It has been remarked that the 2008 viral video "Ronald McDonald Insanity" or "McRoll'd" which remixed the song with samples of Ronald McDonald was the first contact with the Touhou Project for thousands of Western Internet users – the two videos share over 21 million views as of July 2021. It is also known for its use in the rise of the Black MIDI scene, which involve MIDI compositions that contain extremely high numbers of notes. Arrangements of the game's music have appeared in other video games, such as Touhou Luna Nights, Music GunGun!, and Groove Coaster, while Konami released a remix album for Sound Voltex titled Sound Voltex Ultimate Tracks -Touhou Koumakyou Remix-.

Beyond music, the game's characters have achieved significant popularity, resulting in commercial collaborations and starring roles in derivative works. Cirno's popularity, bolstered by the "Perfect Math Class" meme, led to a collaboration with McDonald's Japan in 2021 to promote their beef stew pie. A second collaboration followed in 2024, featuring a new music video where the lyrics of "Perfect Math Class" were humorously changed to "Burger Burger." She also appears in the rhythm game Hatsune Miku: Colorful Stage! and is the protagonist of the fan-made roguelike Mystery Adventure of Cirno! 2.

The characters and setting have also attracted substantial scholarly and critical interest. In his essay "神話文字の書式 2" (Formats of Mythological Characters 2), published in the May 2009 issue of ユリイカ (Eureka) (Volume 41, Issue 6), critic Ryota Fukushima examines the transition of the Touhou Project from its early PC-98 titles to its Windows-era series starting with Embodiment of Scarlet Devil. Fukushima notes an intriguing paradox in Embodiment of Scarlet Devil: despite the franchise being titled "Touhou" (meaning "Eastern" or "Oriental"), the game's prominent characters and motifs—such as vampires and maids—are overtly Western yōkai (monsters) and tropes (p. 22). He further analyzes how the series establishes spatial boundaries, observing that drawing a downward boundary toward the subterranean depths (such as Reimu's descent deep underground to resolve the emerging yōkai incident in Subterranean Animism) is inherently connected to subsequent upward movements (p. 24). Within this structure, Fukushima characterizes the fantasy in Touhou as an allegory or fable (寓話) thoroughly centered on the "past" (p. 24), and conceptualizes the game's bullet-hell patterns (danmaku) as a kind of "cooling agent" (冷却剤) that exerts a "cooling effect" (冷却作用) to regulate and mitigate the high-intensity supernatural conflicts within the narrative (p. 25).

Furthermore, in Reading Spaces in Modern Japan: The Evolution of Sites and Practices of Reading (2023), book historian Andrew T. Kamei-Dyche discusses the representation of books and reading in contemporary popular culture. The study contains a short mention of Patchouli Knowledge, highlighting her role as the quiet custodian of the grand, underground library inside the Scarlet Devil Mansion. Kamei-Dyche contextualizes her character and library within a broader historical discussion about the evolution of physical and virtual reading spaces in Japan, illustrating how traditional Western notions of closed archival spaces are romanticized and repurposed in digital, fan-driven subcultures.

=== Unofficial derivative works ===
Rumia, despite being the stage one boss, has maintained a dedicated fanbase, resulting in her inclusion as a DLC character in the licensed rhythm game Touhou Spell Bubble and high-end merchandise such as watches produced by fashion brand SuperGroupies. She is also the lead character in several action fan games, including Yoiyami Dreamer and Nage-Rumia.

The residents of the Scarlet Devil Mansion—Remilia, Sakuya, Patchouli, and Flandre—appear frequently in secondary games, such as the 3D action RPG Touhou Koukishin: Adventures of Scarlet Curiosity (originally developed by Ankake Spa, released on PlayStation 4 and Steam, and later ported to the Nintendo Switch on September 4, 2025), where players can control either a power-oriented Remilia or a technical, fast-attacking Sakuya. They also appear in the RPG Horafukiyama no Marisa, where the four characters serve as commentators on the player's actions.

Sakuya Izayoi stars as the central protagonist in other notable derivative games. In Touhou Luna Nights, a 2D Metroidvania developed by Team Ladybug and WSS Playground, Sakuya is trapped in a replica world called "Luna Nights" created by Remilia, utilizing knife attacks and time-manipulating abilities to escape; the game was released on multiple platforms, receiving its PlayStation 4 and PlayStation 5 ports on January 25, 2024. She additionally serves as the main character in Koumajou Remilia II: Stranger's Requiem (紅魔城レミリアⅡ妖幻の鎮魂歌), a side-scrolling action Castlevania homage developed by Frontier Aja and published by CFK for Nintendo Switch and PC in late 2023. The game features full voice acting with Miyuki Sawashiro voicing Sakuya and Eri Kitamura voicing Remilia.

The Scarlet Devil Mansion cast also appears in larger ensemble spin-offs. In Touhou no Meikyū: Gensokyo to Tenkan no Taishu (東方の迷宮 幻想郷と天貫の大樹)—a dungeon crawler developed by Nise Eikoku Shinshidan and CUBETYPE that was released on Steam on August 24, 2021—players can recruit and form a massive twelve-character party featuring Remilia, Sakuya, and Patchouli to explore a giant tree that has appeared in Gensokyo. Furthermore, in the 4X strategy game Teikoku Gensokyo ~ TOHOTOPIA (帝国幻想郷~TOHOTOPIA), developed by Remilia Command and released in Steam Early Access on May 14, 2026, players can manage a "Scarlet Empire" led by Remilia Scarlet, who is styled after the Egyptian pharaoh Ramesses II.

Cirno is strongly associated with the number ⑨ in Japanese fan culture, a meme originating from Phantasmagoria of Flower View, whose manual labeled her as an "idiot" (バカ), leading fans to adopt ⑨ as her symbolic number. References to this association continue to appear in derivative works and promotional media, including the 2025 McDonald's collaboration video based on Cirno's Perfect Math Class, which referenced the song's ⑨周年バージョン, and the Steam release of Fushigi no Daibōken: Cirno Kenzan! 2, which was scheduled for 9 September (9/9) at a price of ¥999, numbers explicitly chosen for their connection to Cirno.

The character Sakuya Izayoi has also earned individual recognition in media character rankings; for instance, the Hungarian publication AniMagazin ranked Sakuya 10th on its list of top anime maids in 2019, noting that despite her origins as a video game character rather than an anime character, her high popularity and the vast volume of fanworks centered around her made her an essential inclusion.

Unofficial anime have also been made for the game. Fantasy Kaleidoscope ~ The Memories of Phantasm (幻想万華鏡) by the circle Manpuku Jinja adapted the plot of Embodiment of Scarlet Devil to anime form, while characters from the game also appear in Musou Kakyou: A Summer Day's Dream (東方二次創作同人アニメ 夢想夏郷).

== See also ==
- 2002 in video games
