= Fossilized Wonders =

2025 bullet hell video game

- Game cover with a silhouette of Ariya Iwanaga
- Developer: Team Shanghai Alice
- Publisher: Team Shanghai Alice
- Series: Touhou Project
- Platform: Windows
- Release: August 17, 2025
- Genre: Bullet hell
- Mode: Single-player

Touhou Kinjoukyou ~ Fossilized Wonders (東方錦上京 ~ Fossilized Wonders.; lit. "Capital Atop Magnificence") is a bullet hell video game developed by Team Shanghai Alice. It is the 20th official game and 33rd overall of the Touhou Project series.

It was announced on April 12, 2025; received its demo release on May 5, 2025, at Reitaisai 22; and released on August 17, 2025, at Comiket 106 alongside a Steam release.

== Gameplay ==
Reimu fighting the Stage 1 boss, Ubame Chirizuka

Fossilized Wonders is a vertically scrolling danmaku video game where various enemies fire projectiles the player must dodge and fire bullets back at the enemies with. The game's life system allows multiple hits before a game over, and its Spell Card system has cards releasing powerful attacks limited in quantity. Defeating enemies increases the player's score, where there is an integrated high score system, and can drop power-ups such as extra lives and bombs. At the end of each stage is a boss with significantly more health the player must fight before advancing to the next stage.

Fossilized Wonders introduces a new mechanic to the series, where the playable character combines various different types of Stones that affect their shot type.

== Characters ==
Similar to older entries in the series, only Reimu Hakurei and Marisa Kirisame are playable.

=== Playable characters ===
- Reimu Hakurei (博麗 霊夢), the miko of the Hakurei Shrine
- Marisa Kirisame (霧雨 魔理沙), a human magician from the Forest of Magic

=== Boss characters ===
- Ubame Chirizuka (塵塚 ウバメ), the stage 1 boss and chief of the Yamanba.
- Chimi Houjuu (封獸 チミ), the stage 2 boss and a Chimi. She shares a surname with Nue Houjuu.
- Nareko Michigami (道神 馴子), the stage 3 boss and a Dousojin.
- Yuiman Asama (ユイマン・浅間), the stage 4 boss.
- Watatsuki no Toyohime (綿月 豊姫), the stage 5 boss and a Lunarian.
- Ariya Iwanaga (磐永 阿梨夜), the stage 6 boss. She is directly based on Iwanaga-hime.
- Nina Watari (渡里 ニナ), the extra stage boss and a shen.

== Development ==
ZUN planned on making Fossilized Wonders a traditional bullet hell shooter, where the only playable characters are Reimu and Marisa.

ZUN has used generative artificial intelligence for varying background elements for Fossilized Wonders, a decision Touhou fans have criticized. ZUN later confirmed the use of AI in Fossilized Wonders, saying that he wanted to "reduce it to nothing more than a tool" and confirming that he used Adobe Firefly. ZUN has also said that generative AI is relevant to the theme of Fossilized Wonders.

== Reception ==
During the "Dengeki Indie Game Awards 2026" held by Dengeki Online, the game was voted as the second best shooting game.
