= Tokyo Denki University =

University in Tokyo, Japan

- 東京電機大学
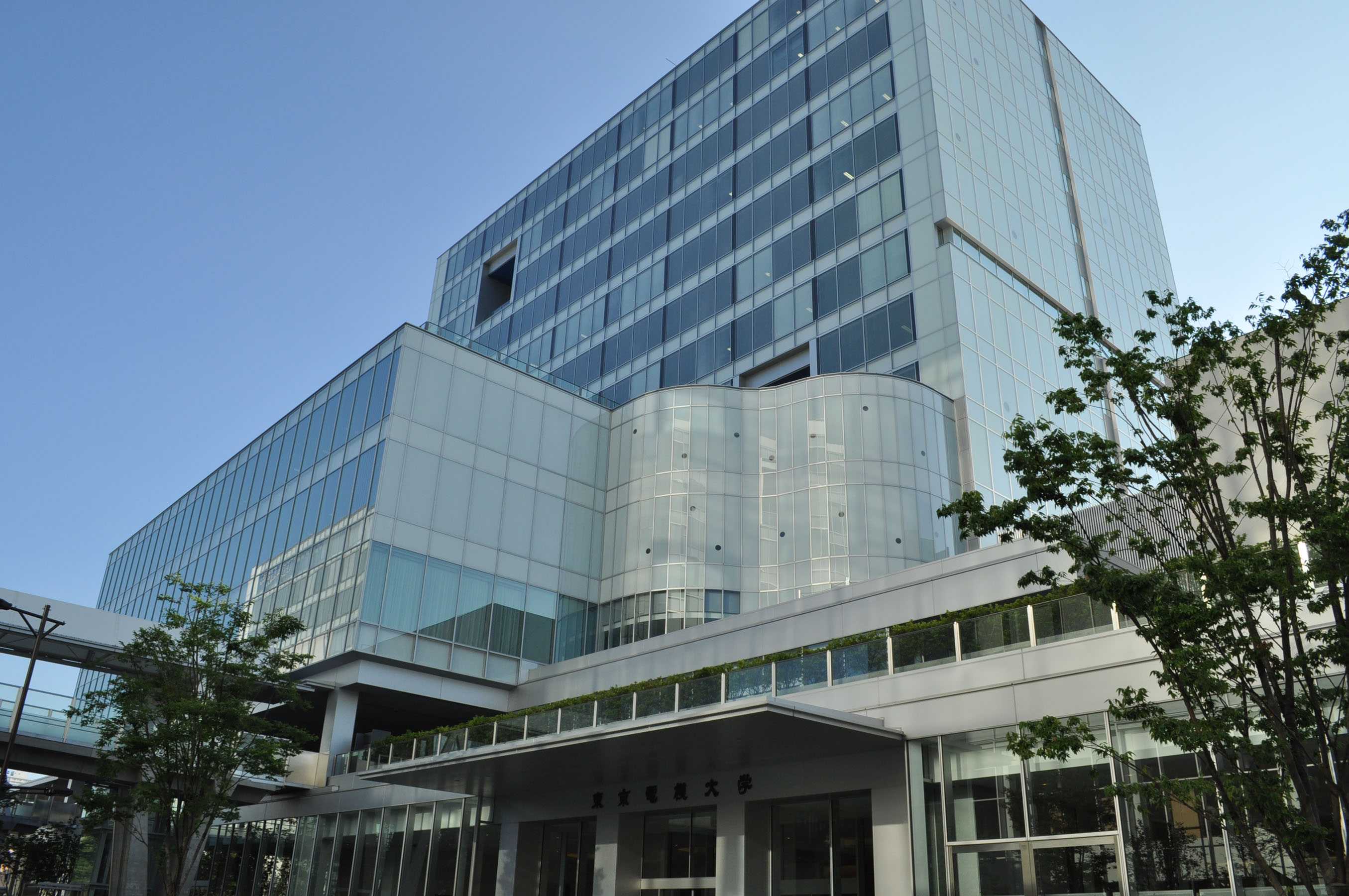
- Tokyo Senju Campus
- Former names: Denki Gakko (1907–1939); Tokyo Denki Technical High School (1939–1944); Denki Technical College (1944–1949)
- Motto: respect for practical science
- Type: Private
- Established: 1907
- Founder: Seiichi Hirota
- President: Tadahiko Ibamoto
- Students: 10,558 (2025)
- Undergraduates: 9,347 (2025)
- Postgraduates: 1,211 (2025)
- Location: Tokyo, Japan; 35°44′51″N 139°48′26″E
- Campus: Adachi, Tokyo Hatoyama, Saitama Inzai, Chiba
- Colors: dark blue
- Website: dendai.ac.jp (in Japanese) www.dendai.ac.jp/en

Japanese name
- Kanji: 東京電機大学
- Hiragana: とうきょうでんきだいがく
- Katakana: トウキョウデンキダイガク
Transcriptions
- Romanization: Tokyo Denki Daigaku
- Location in Tokyo

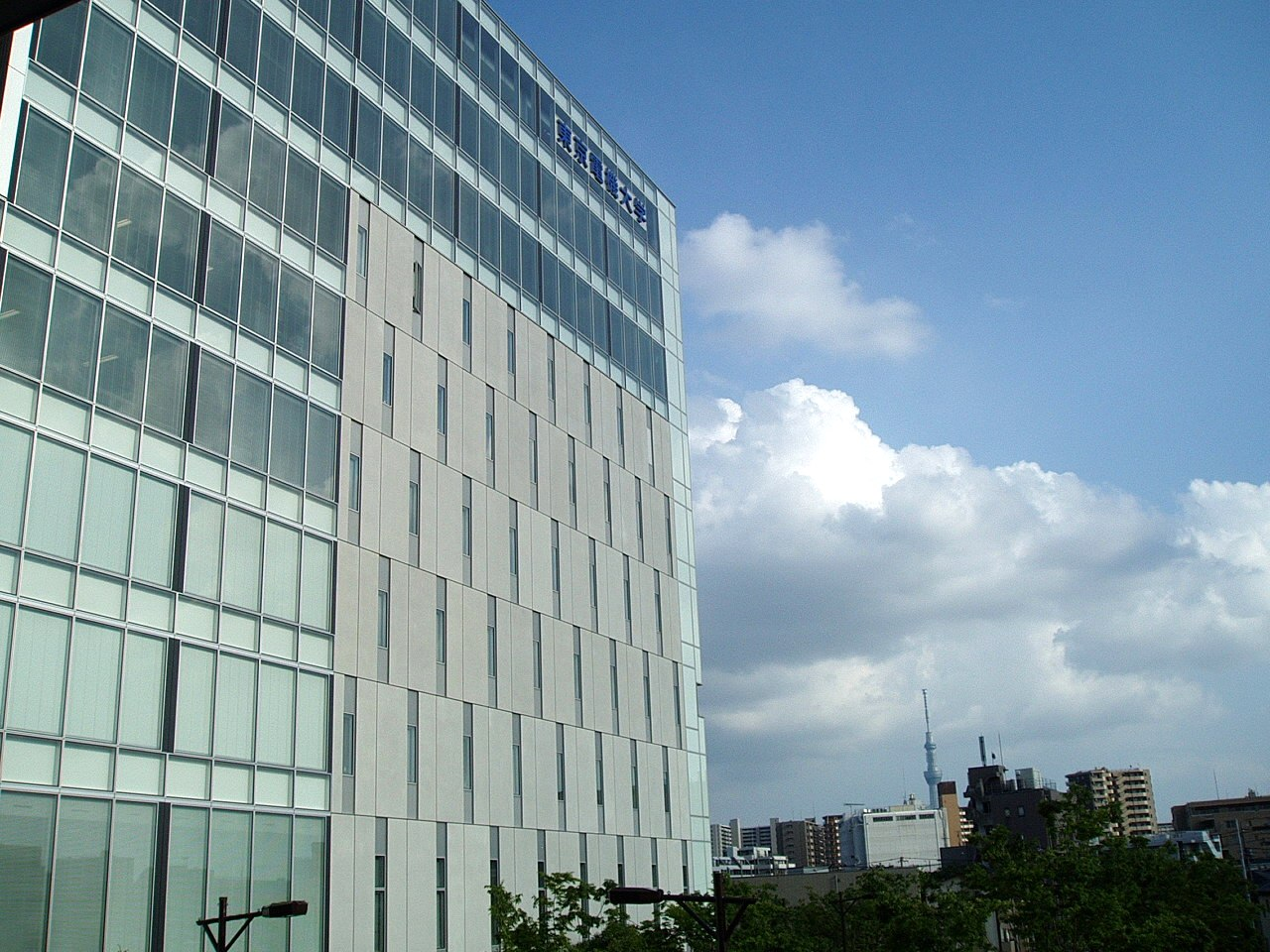
Tokyo-Senju-Bldg4

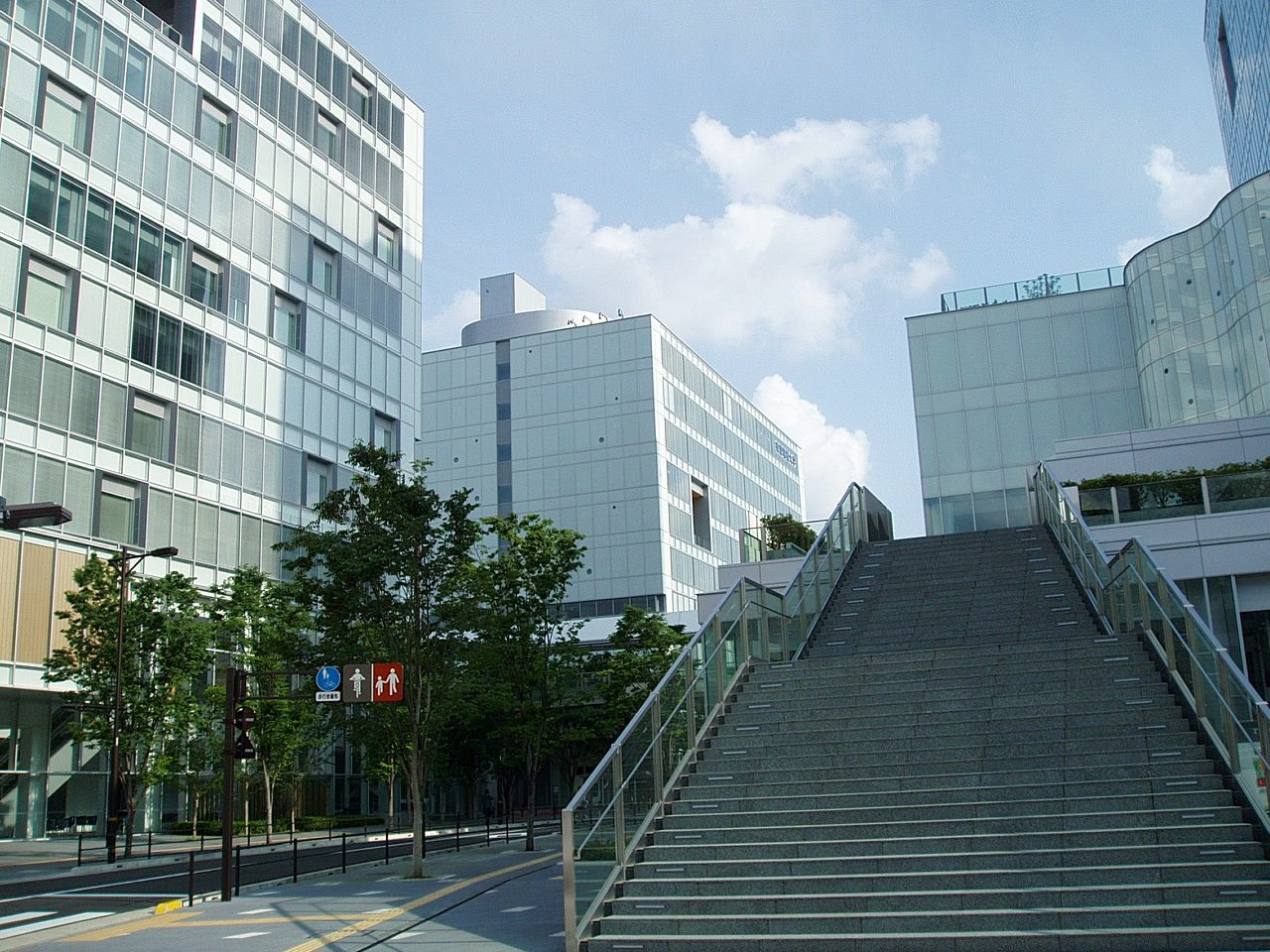
Tokyo-Senju Campus Entrance

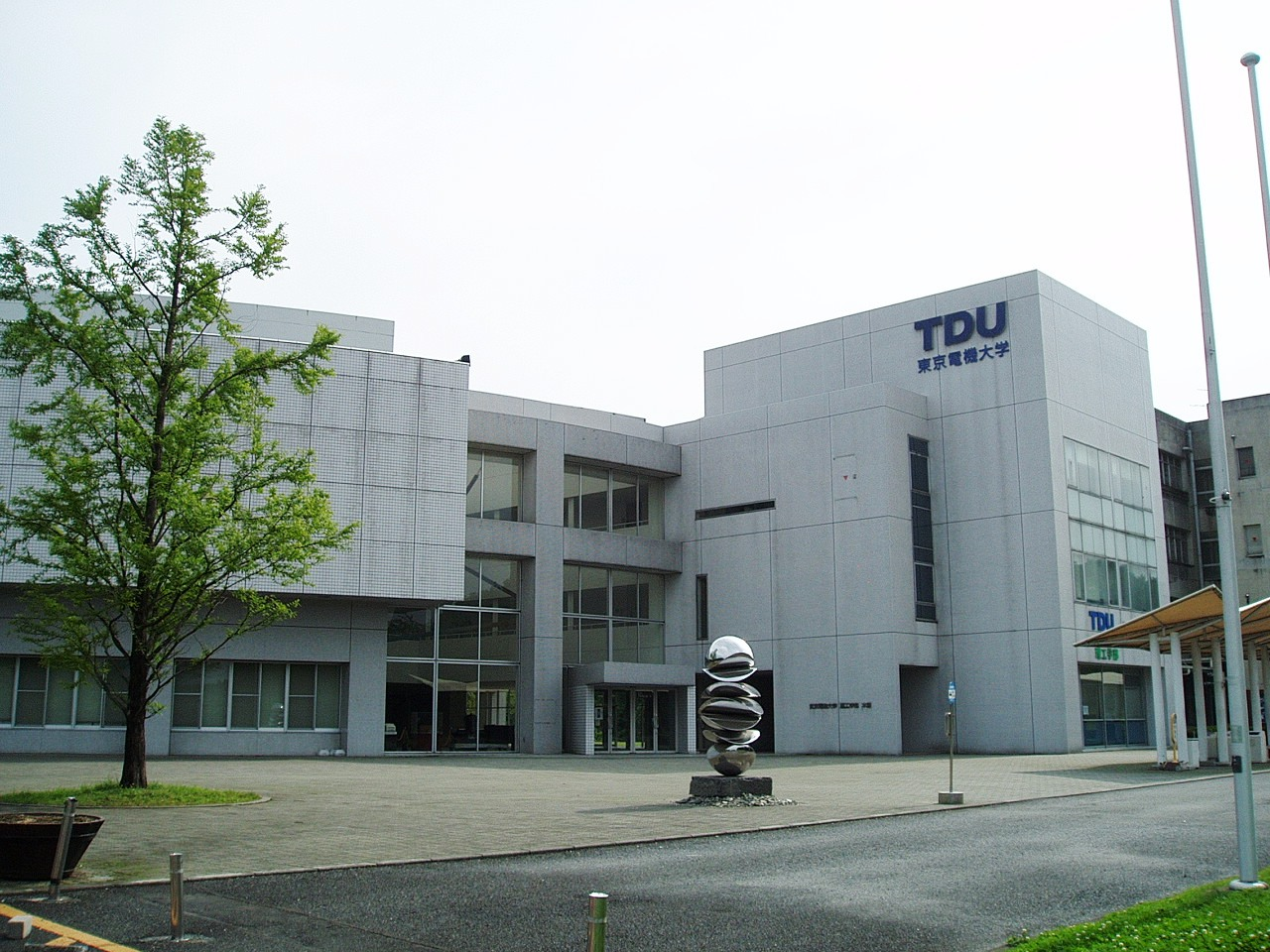
Saitama-Hatoyama-Bldg10 (main building)

Tokyo Denki University (東京電機大学, Tōkyō denki daigaku) is a private university in Adachi, Tokyo, Japan. The predecessor of the school was founded in 1907 as Denki Gakkō (電機学校). It was chartered as a university in 1949 with Yasujiro Niwa as first president. Denki (電機) means an electric device in Japanese, and the university is dedicated to science and technology.

== Organization ==
=== Undergraduate schools ===
- College of Engineering
  - Department of Mechanical Engineering
  - Department of Electrical and Electronic Engineering
  - Department of Electronic Systems Engineering
  - Department of Applied Chemistry
  - Department of Advanced Mechanical Engineering
  - Department of Information and Communication Engineering
- College of Science and Engineering
  - natural science course
  - Information System Design Course
  - life engineering Course
  - mechanical engineering Course
  - Electronic and Information Engineering Course
  - Architecture and Urban Environment Course
- College of Future science
  - Department of Information Media
  - Department of Robotics & Mechatronics
  - Department of Architecture
- College of Systems Design Engineering
  - Department of Information Systems Engineering
  - Department of Design Engineering
- College of Second Department Engineering
  - Department of Mechanical Engineering
  - Department of Electrical and Electronic Engineering
  - Department of Information and Communication Engineering

=== Graduate schools ===
- Graduate School of Engineering (Master's Program)
  - Electrical and Electronic Engineering
  - Electronic Systems Engineering
  - Materials Engineering
  - Mechanical Engineering
  - Advanced Mechanical Engineering
  - Information and Communication Engineering
- Graduate School of Science and Engineering (Master's Program)
  - Natural Science
  - Informatics
  - Life science and Engineering
  - Mechanical Engineering
  - Electronic Engineering
  - Architecture and Urban Environment
- Graduate School of Future science (Master's Program)
  - Architecture
  - Information Media Science
  - Robotics & Mechatronics
- Graduate School of Systems Design Engineering (Master's Program)
  - Information Systems Engineering
  - Design Engineering
- Graduate School of Advanced Science and Technology (Doctor's Program)

== Notable alumni ==
- Jirō Nitta, novelist and meteorologist
- Eiji Tsuburaya, special effects director of films and television series, including Godzilla and Ultraman
- Tomohiro Nishikado, creator of the Space Invaders shooter game
- Jun'ya "ZUN" Ōta, sole member of Team Shanghai Alice and creator of the Touhou Project shoot 'em up video game series
- Kantoku, illustrator and character designer
- Hisashi Koinuma (鯉沼久史), director of the Samurai Warriors video game series and chief operating officer of Koei Tecmo (2015–)

== In popular culture ==
- In the visual novel Steins;Gate, characters Okabe Rintaro and Hashida Itaru attend the university.
