= Bullet hell =

Video game genre

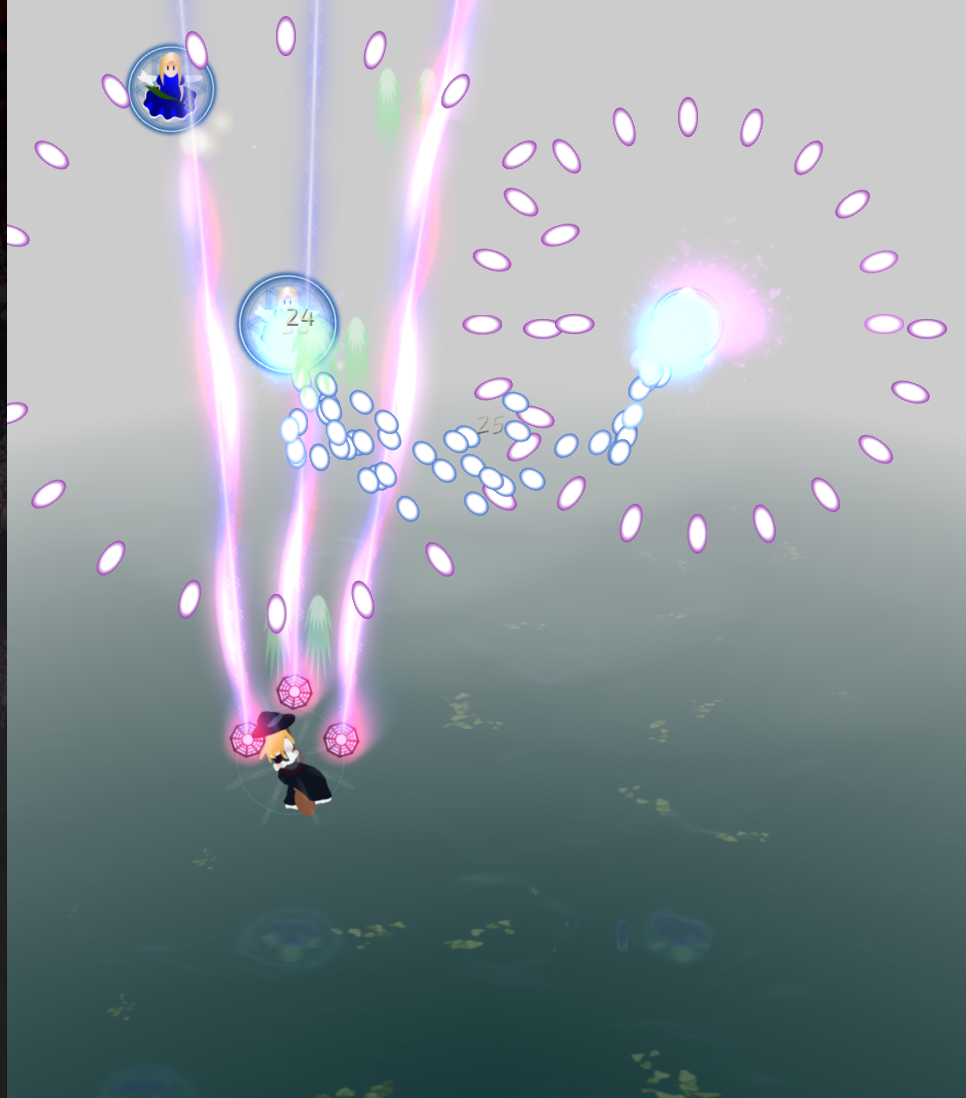
Danmaku in Taisei Project, an open source fan game of Touhou Project

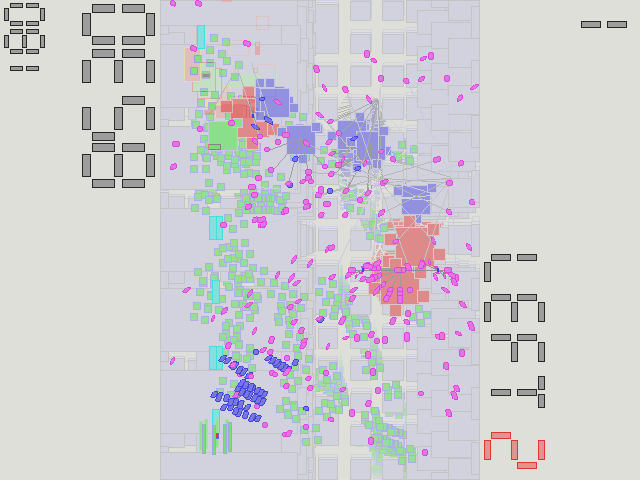
Noiz2sa - little hard

Bullet hell (弾幕, danmaku; literally "barrage" or "bullet curtain"), also known as manic shooter, is a subgenre of shoot 'em up video games with large amounts of projectiles the player is required to dodge. Introduced in 1993 with Batsugun and initially limited to vertically scrolling shooters, bullet hell elements were later added to other genres. The large number of projectiles is usually balanced by the player ship being treated as a single point for collision detection.

Pure bullet hell games remain a niche genre due to their high level of difficulty.

== History ==
The origin of the bullet hell genre is attributed to Toaplan, a now-defunct Japanese video game studio that developed arcade shoot 'em ups. In 1993, the studio released Batsugun, an innovative game that, after the first level, featured increasingly complex and hypnotic bullet patterns. In order to make the game more fair to players, only a small part of the player's ship served as the hitbox, rather than the entire vessel itself. This remains a tenet of bullet hell shooters, allowing players to navigate through seemingly impossible swarms of bullets. The company collapsed soon after, but former employees started a different studio, Cave, that continued to develop bullet hell games.

The 1995 DonPachi added more twists to the formula that continue to be reflected in the genre going forward. It added a fighting game-style combo system that forced the player to defeat enemies quickly or lose score. Around this time, the Touhou Project, the most well-known and prolific fan-made shooter series as recognized by Guinness World Records, was also conceived. Largely the work of a single doujin soft developer, ZUN, he had begun developing the games to showcase his musical compositions. The second game in the series, the 1997 Story of Eastern Wonderland, was its first bullet hell shoot 'em up. The 2002 Embodiment of Scarlet Devil marked a large step forward for the series, and, due to its Windows release, gained massive popularity with a new Western audience.

In 2001, Ikaruga gained significant attention outside of Japan due to its release on the GameCube. It was many Western players' first experience with bullet hell, and gained a respected place in gaming culture. In the modern day, more bullet hell titles have been released on mobile platforms than ever before. While it is still a heavily Japan-centric genre, there have been some Western-developed exceptions, such as Jamestown: Legend of the Lost Colony.

=== Bullet hell hybrids ===
Some games began incorporating bullet hell elements despite being different genres, muddying definitions of what exactly the genre is. RPG/bullet hell hybrids include Knights in the Nightmare (2008), Undertale (2015), Nier: Automata (2017) and Deltarune (2018–present) which have combat systems featuring bullet dodging. Enter the Gungeon (2016) is a twin-stick shooter roguelike with "smart" bullets. Returnal was cited to have injected the bullet hell style into a third-person shooter roguelike. Due to the high difficulty of pure bullet hell games, such hybrids open the genre to a new audience who might not have considered trying them otherwise.

=== Competitive play ===
The competitive bullet hell scene is defined by hyper-fast reflex gameplay with a focus on achieving high scores. Game scholar Alexandra Orlando claims that it has not become an esport due to a lack of human drama, as well as a belief that highly-skilled Japanese players are "gods" of the genre, causing fewer Western players to pick them up. Approximately 90% of records are held by Japanese players.

== Bullet heaven ==
Bullet heaven or reverse bullet hell are terms for games in which, rather than attempting to dodge enemy projectiles, the player's character or vessel generates the bullets, typically in the manner of an auto shooter, in order to take out waves of enemies while the player moves. These games often have the player choose power-ups from a random selection to improve attack and passive abilities. Such games became popular with the release of Vampire Survivors in 2022, and include games like Brotato, 20 Minutes Till Dawn, and HoloCure – Save the Fans!. A common term for the genre, "survivors-like", stems from the popularity of Vampire Survivors.
