= Kumikyoku Nico Nico Douga =

Series of video medleys

"組曲『ニコニコ動画』"
- The video's title card

Song by Shimo
- Language: (Not applicable)
- English title: Kumikyoku Nico Nico Douga
- Genre: medleys, dance music
- Length: 10:48
- Songwriter: Shimo
- Composer: Shimo

Audio sample
- The song's clip with four songs combined.: file; help

Kumikyoku Nico Nico Douga (組曲『ニコニコ動画』, Kumikyoku "Nikoniko Dōga"; lit. "Suite: 'Smile Video'") is a series of video medleys and the title of a video in the series created by a Nico Nico Douga user named "Shimo" (しも).

== Overview ==
On 5 June 2007, a video called "ニコニコ動画中毒の方へ贈る一曲" was uploaded to Nico Nico Douga by Shimo. The "組曲『ニコニコ動画』" was then uploaded on 23 June. The video quickly went viral for its combination of songs popular on the site, with lots of derivative works were created. The song was ranked five most watched video in 2020. There were ten milions of views recorded in 2017, the video's 10th anniversary.

List of videos related to the "Kumikyoku" series uploaded by Shimo
ID of Niconico Douga	Japanese name	Uploaded date
sm405303	ニコニコ動画中毒の方へ贈る一曲	4 June 2007
sm500873	組曲『ニコニコ動画』	23 June 2007
sm1089391	ニコニコ動画物語.wav	18 September 2007
sm2959233	ニコニコ動画流星群	10 April 2008
sm7233711	七色のニコニコ動画	2 June 2009
sm14242201	組曲『ニコニコ動画』改	23 June 2011
sm17554301	超組曲『ニコニコ動画』	15 April 2012

== Reception ==
5 days after the original video was uploaded, another user uploaded a version with his own singing. After that, many users began to upload spin-offs (such as the play version, dance version) of the original video. Some of the lyrics from the original songs were improvised or mondegreen were used instead. Users sometime compile multiple user versions of the medley to form a 'chorus' video. Most of these "auditory illusions" were already well-known/prevalent on Nico Nico Douga.

The videos attracted a lot of singers who would add their own vocals to karaoke versions of the songs, the number of such videos far exceeded that of earlier videos.

It's often misunderstood that the title "Kumikyoku" (組曲, lit. musical suite, or music selection) is not a "music selection" in a strict sense, only "Nico Nico Douga medley songs used in it".

Some other videos posted include ones where users played instruments (recorder, piano, violin, a variety of drums and even bamboo flutes and other musical instruments) or an entire Orchestra performing an instrumental version of the song.

The medleys were also translated and sung in English, Hebrew, French, Korean, Chinese, Thai, Malay and Tagalog. Two such well known versions are the ones by C_Chat and the National Central University.

2 August 2007, C_Chat, a user of the Taiwan BBS board PTT Bulletin Board System, used a week of time to compile a group of people singing Kumikyoku in a chorus and also uploaded it to Nico Nico Douga. This is the first video based on Kumikyoku Nico Nico Douga outside Japan, and also let Japanese users realise that Nico Nico Douga had a lot of overseas users.

== Lists of songs used ==
The following is a list of songs used in the videos of the Kumikyoku Nico Nico Douga series.

=== A Song for Nico Nico Dougaholics ===
A Song for Nico Nico Dougaholics (ニコニコ動画中毒の方へ贈る一曲, Nico Nico Douga Chūdoku no Kata e Okuru Ikkyoku)
#	Song title	Source
1	Let's Go! Onmyōji	Game; Shin Gōketsuji Ichizoku: Bonnō Kaihō insert song
2	Marisa Stole The Precious Thing	Game; Perfect Cherry Blossom BGM - Doll Judgment ~ The Girl who Plays with People's Shapes (arrangement by IOSYS)
3	Omoide wa Okkusenman!	Game; Mega Man 2 Dr. Wily Stage 1 BGM (arrangement by Blue Fang (蒼い牙, Aoi Kiba))
4	God knows...	Anime; The Melancholy of Haruhi Suzumiya insert song
5	Motteke! Sailor Fuku	Anime; Lucky Star opening theme
6	"Genesis of Aquarion"	Anime; Genesis of Aquarion opening theme
7	Futari no Mojipittan	Game; Kotoba no Puzzle: Mojipittan theme song
8	Tsurupettan	Remix; Flight of the Bamboo Cutter ~ Lunatic Princess, Let's Go! Onmyōji, Futari no Mojipittan remix (arrangement by Silver Forest)
9	true my heart	Game; Nursery Rhyme opening theme
10	kiss my lips	Song; by ave;new feat. Saori Sakura
11	RODEO MACHINE	PV; Sukoshi Tanoshikunaru Douga by HALFBY
12	DRAGON QUEST Overture	Game; Dragon Quest theme song (lyrics from Kimi ga Yo or the translator's national anthem when translated into other languages outside Japan; for example, the Hebrew version uses lyrics from Hatikva instead)
13	FINAL FANTASY	Game; Final Fantasy theme song
14	Gacha Gacha Cute - Figu@mate	Game; Figu@mate opening theme
15	You are the Prince of Tennis	Musical; Prince of Tennis insert song

=== Suite: Nico Nico Douga ===
Suite: Nico Nico Douga (組曲『ニコニコ動画』, Kumikyoku Nico Nico Douga)
#	Song title	Source
1	Agent Departs at Night	Game; THE IDOLM@STER insert song
2	Hare Hare Yukai	Anime; The Melancholy of Haruhi Suzumiya ending theme
3	Stops at the affected area and immediately dissolves ~ Lunatic Udongein	Game; Imperishable Night BGM - Lunatic Eyes ~ Invisible Full Moon (arrangement by IOSYS)
4-1	Help me, ERINNNNNN!!	Game; Imperishable Night BGM - Flight of the Bamboo Cutter ~ Lunatic Princess (arrangement by COOL&CREATE)
4-2 (3)	Stops at the affected area and immediately dissolves ~ Lunatic Udongein	Previously used within the medley.
5	nowhere	Anime; Madlax insert song
6	Fang of Critias	Anime; Yu-Gi-Oh! Duel Monsters BGM
7	GONG	Game; 3rd Super Robot Wars Alpha: To the End of the Galaxy opening theme
8-1	Beware the Forest's Mushrooms	Game; Super Mario RPG BGM
8-2 (7)	GONG	Previously used within the medley.
9	Butter-Fly	Anime; Digimon Adventure opening theme
10-1	Makka na Chikai	Anime; Buso Renkin opening theme
10-2 (9)	Butter-Fly	Previously used within the medley.
11-1	Air Man ga Taosenai	Game; Mega Man 2 BGM (original song; arrangement by Sera/Tetsukuzuokiba)
11-2 (12)	Yūki Vs. Iji	Mentioned below.
12	Yūki Vs. Iji	Musical; Prince of Tennis insert song
13	Uninstall	Anime; Bokurano opening theme
14	Tori no Uta	Game; Air opening theme
15	you	Game; Higurashi No Naku Koro Ni Kai: Meakashi-hen ending theme
16-1	Marisa Stole The Precious Thing	Game; Perfect Cherry Blossom BGM - Doll Judgment ~ The Girl who Plays with People's Shapes (arrangement by IOSYS)
16-2 (15)	you	Previously used within the medley.
17-1	Omoide wa Okkusenman!	Game; Mega Man 2 Dr. Wily Stage 1 BGM (arrangement by Blue Fang (蒼い牙, Aoi Kiba))
17-2 (16)	Marisa Stole The Precious Thing	Previously used within the medley.
18-1 (17)	Omoide wa Okkusenman!	Previously used within the medley.
18-2	God knows...	Anime; The Melancholy of Haruhi Suzumiya insert song
19	Motteke! Sailor Fuku	Anime; Lucky Star opening theme
20	Gacha Gacha Hertz ~ Figu@radio	Game; Figu@mate Carnival opening theme
21	"Genesis of Aquarion"	Anime; Genesis of Aquarion opening theme
22	Futari no Mojipittan	Game; Kotoba no Puzzle: Mojipittan theme song
23	Tsurupettan	Remix; Flight of the Bamboo Cutter ~ Lunatic Princess, Let's Go! Onmyōji, Futari no Mojipittan remix (arrangement by Silver Forest)
24	Here we go!	Game; Super Mario World BGM
25	true my heart	Game; Nursery Rhyme opening theme
26	kiss my lips	Song; by ave;new feat. Saori Sakura
27	RODEO MACHINE	PV; Sukoshi Tanoshikunaru Douga by HALFBY
28	DRAGON QUEST Overture	Game; Dragon Quest theme song (lyrics from Kimi ga Yo or the translator's national anthem when translated into other languages outside Japan; for example, the Hebrew version uses lyrics from Hatikva instead)
29	FINAL FANTASY	Game; Final Fantasy theme song
30	Gacha Gacha Cute - Figu@mate	Game; Figu@mate opening theme.
30-1 (29)	FINAL FANTASY	Previously used within the medley.
31	You are the Prince of Tennis	Musical; Prince of Tennis insert song
32	Let's Go! Onmyōji	Game; Shin Gōketsuji Ichizoku: Bonnō Kaihō insert song
33	Sakura, Sakura feat. foo-san	Song; Japanese folk song; the same song that Nico Nico Douga used to use to replace deleted videos

=== Nico Nico Douga Monogatari.wav ===
Nico Nico Douga Monogatari.wav (ニコニコ動画物語.wav, Nico Nico Douga Monogatari.wav)
#	Song title	Source
0	Intro	Remix; Marisa Stole The Precious Thing, Mega Man 2 Dr. Wily Stage 1 BGM, You are the Prince of Tennis, Let's Go! Onmyōji mix
1	Endless Rain	Song; by X Japan
2	Konayuki	Song; by Remioromen
3	GREEN GREENS	Game; Kirby's Dream Land BGM
4-1	Here we go!	Game; Super Mario World BGM
4-2 (3)	GREEN GREENS	Game; Kirby Super Star stage BGM
5-1	SMILES&TEARS	Game; Mother 2 ending song
5-2 (6)	Eight Melodies	Game; Mother main theme
5-3 (7)	Ai no Theme	Game; Mother 3 main theme
8	CANDY POP	Song; by Heartsdales
9-1	GO MY WAY!!	Game; THE IDOLM@STER dance song
9-2 (5)	SMILES&TEARS	Previously used within the medley.
10-1	Motteke! Sailor Fuku	Anime; Lucky Star opening theme
10-2 (11)	God knows...	Anime; The Melancholy of Haruhi Suzumiya insert song
12	Agent Departs at Night	Game; THE IDOLM@STER insert song
13	Hare Hare Yukai	Anime; The Melancholy of Haruhi Suzumiya ending theme
14-1	Hito toshite Jiku ga Bureteiru	Anime; Sayonara, Zetsubou-Sensei opening theme
14-2 (13)	Hare Hare Yukai	Previously used within the medley.
15	PRIDE	Song; Pride Fighting Championships theme song; animation sequence from the MAD SUMOU
16	Bonmawari	TV Show; Hachi Ji Da Yo! Zenin Shūgō! TV-size BGM; animation sequence from the MAD Ichiro's Laser Beam Annihilation
17	Kakero! Spiderman	TV Show; Spiderman TV opening theme
18	Ievan Polkka	Song; by Loituma
19	Miko Miko Nurse: Theme of Love	Game; Miko Miko Nurse opening theme
20	Saikyō○×Keikaku	Anime; Sumomomo Momomo opening theme
21	Usatei	Game; Phantasmagoria of Flower View BGM - Lord Usa's White Flag (arrangement by IOSYS)
22-1	Gacha Gacha Hertz ~ Figu@radio	Game; Figu@mate Carnival opening theme
22-2 (23)	Stops at the affected area and immediately dissolves ~ Lunatic Udongein	Game; Imperishable Night BGM - Lunatic Eyes ~ Invisible Full Moon (arrangement by IOSYS)
24-1	Help me, ERINNNNNN!!	Game; Imperishable Night BGM - Flight of the Bamboo Cutter ~ Lunatic Princess (arrangement by COOL&CREATE)
24-2 (25)	Maggare ↓ Spectacle	Anime; The Melancholy of Haruhi Suzumiya Itsuki Koizumi character song
26-1	Sakuranbo	Song; by Ai Otsuka; animation sequence from Fate/stay night
26-2 (27)	Koi no Mikuru Densetsu	Anime; The Melancholy of Haruhi Suzumiya episode 00 opening theme
26-3	Battle with Gilgamesh	Game; Final Fantasy V Big Bridge BGM
28	Battle with Gilgamesh	Game; Final Fantasy V Big Bridge BGM
29	You are the Prince of Tennis	Musical; Prince of Tennis insert song
30	Yuki to Kodomo	Web Original; Neko Nabe BGM
31	Taishou.a	Anime; Higurashi no Naku Koro ni Kai Ending Theme
32	Naraku no Hana	Anime; Higurashi no Naku Koro ni Kai Opening Theme
33	Tsuki no Waltz	TV Show; from NHK's Minna no Uta (Oct - Nov 2004)
33-1	GOLD RUSH	Game; from beatmania IIDX14 GOLD's song collection
34	GOLD RUSH	Game; from beatmania IIDX14 GOLD's song collection
35	Dramatic	Anime; Big Windup! opening theme
36	Zankoku na Tenshi no These	Anime; Neon Genesis Evangelion opening theme
37-1	U.N. Owen was Her?	Game; The Embodiment of Scarlet Devil BGM (lyrics vary from mix to mix, but the most common set are from a vocal track in Sweets Time)
37-2 (36)	Zankoku na Tenshi no These	Previously used within the medley.
38	Necrofantasia	Game; Perfect Cherry Blossom BGM
39	Jounetsu - Tairiku	TV Show; Jounetsu - Tairiku theme song
40	Princess Bride!	Game; Princess Bride opening theme
41	Love Cheat!	Game; Itadaku Jungalian R opening theme
42	Butter-Fly	Anime; Digimon Adventure opening theme
43	Makka na Chikai	Anime; Buso Renkin opening theme
44	SKILL	Game; 2nd Super Robot Wars Alpha opening theme
45	"Genesis of Aquarion"	Anime; Genesis of Aquarion opening theme
46	Futari no Mojipittan	Game; Kotoba no Puzzle: Mojipittan theme song
47	Tsurupettan	Remix; Flight of the Bamboo Cutter ~ Lunatic Princess, Let's Go! Onmyōji, Futari no Mojipittan remix (arrangement by Silver Forest)
48	true my heart	Game; Nursery Rhyme opening theme
49	relations	Game; THE IDOLM@STER dance song
50	Uninstall	Anime; Bokurano opening theme
51	Tori no Uta	Game; Air opening theme
52-1	you	Game; Higurashi No Naku Koro Ni Kai: Meakashi-hen ending theme
52-2 (50)	Uninstall	Previously used within the medley.
53	Marisa Stole The Precious Thing	Game; Perfect Cherry Blossom BGM - Doll Judgment ~ The Girl who Plays with People's Shapes (arrangement by IOSYS)
53-2 (51)	you	Previously used within the medley.
54-1	Omoide wa Okkusenman!	Game; Mega Man 2 Dr. Wily Stage 1 BGM (arrangement by Blue Fang (蒼い牙, Aoi Kiba))
54-2 (53)	Marisa Stole the Precious Thing	Previously used within the medley.
55	You are the Prince of Tennis	Previously used within the medley.
56	Let's Go! Onmyōji	Game; Shin Gōketsuji Ichizoku: Bonnō Kaihō insert song
ED1-1 (54)	Omoide wa Okkusenman!	Previously used within the medley.
ED1-2 (48)	true my heart	Previously used within the medley.
ED2-1 (53)	Marisa Stole the Precious Thing	Previously used within the medley.
ED2-2 (22)	Gacha Gacha Cute Figu@mate	Previously used within the medley.
ED3-1 (56)	Let's Go! Onmyōji	Previously used within the medley.
ED3-2 (4)	Here we go!	Previously used within the medley.
ED4-1 (55)	You are the Prince of Tennis	Previously used within the medley.
ED4-2(10)	Motteke! Sailor Fuku	Previously used within the medley.
ED5 (56)	Let's Go! Onmyōji	Previously used within the medley.

=== Nico Nico Douga Ryūseigun ===
Nico Nico Douga Ryūseigun (ニコニコ動画流星群, Nico Nico Douga Ryūseigun)
#	Song title	Source
0	Announcement Jingle	Song; the song Nico Nico Douga uses to notify its users of an announcement
1	STAR RISE	Anime; Bamboo Blade ending theme
2	Ne-Ni-Ge de Risetto!	Anime; Lucky Star Tsukasa Hiiragi character song
3-1	Hanamaru☆Sensation	Anime; Kodomo no Jikan ending theme
3-2 (4)	Caramelldansen	Song; by Caramell; animation sequence from Popotan
5	Crash! Gourmet Race	Game; Kirby Super Star Duel! Gourmet Race stage BGM
6	nowhere	Anime; Madlax insert song
7	Cheetahmen 2 BGM	Game; Cheetahmen 2 BGM
8	Ievan Polkka	Song; by Loituma
9-1	Balalaika	Anime; Kirarin Revolution opening theme
9-2	Yaranaika	Parody; Kirarin Revolution opening theme (Balalaika)
10	Danjo	Song; by Tarō
11	Montagues and Capulets (Dance of the Knights)	Classical music; by Sergei Prokofiev; used in the homebrew game Noroi no Yakata
12	I'm lovin' it	Advertising; from McDonald's' ad campaign
13	The Last Wolf Suite	Anime; Rurouni Kenshin BGM
14	I Won't Sleep Until I Clear This!	Web Original; composition by Tetsukuzuokiba and Team.Nekokan [Neko]
15	Asu he no Hōkō	Game; Muv-Luv Alternative opening theme
16	Air Man ga Taosenai	Game; Mega Man 2 BGM (original song; arrangement by Sera/Tetsukuzuokiba)
17	Melt	Web Original; composition by ryo/supercell for the Vocaloid Hatsune Miku
18	Mag Mell / Dango Daikazoku	Anime; CLANNAD opening and ending themes
19	Yearnings of the Wind	Game; Chrono Trigger BGM
20	Yuki, Muon, Madobe Nite	Anime; The Melancholy of Haruhi Suzumiya Yuki Nagato character song
21	you	Game; Higurashi No Naku Koro Ni Kai: Meakashi-hen ending theme
22	Marisa Stole The Precious Thing	Game; Perfect Cherry Blossom BGM - Doll Judgment ~ The Girl who Plays with People's Shapes (arrangement by IOSYS)
23	U.N. Owen Was Her?	Game; The Embodiment of Scarlet Devil BGM (lyrics vary from mix to mix, but the most common set are from a vocal track in Sweets Time)
24	Make Us Your Brides!	Game; Touhou Project - Multiple BGMs from 3 different Touhou games used (arrangement by IOSYS)
25	Omoide wa Okkusenman!	Game; Mega Man 2 Dr. Wily Stage 1 BGM (arrangement by Blue Fang (蒼い牙, Aoi Kiba))
26-1	(Åh) När ni tar saken i egna händer	Song; by After Dark
26-2 (27)	Hare Hare Yukai	Anime; The Melancholy of Haruhi Suzumiya ending theme
28-1	God knows...	Anime; The Melancholy of Haruhi Suzumiya insert song
28-2 (29)	Joint	Anime; Shakugan no Shana II opening theme
30-1	Kaidoku Funō	Anime; Code Geass: Lelouch of the Rebellion opening theme
30-2 (31)	The happy escapism song 〜Life is Over Song〜	Song; by Saka-ROW
32	Perfect Star Perfect Style	Song; by Perfume
33	Stops at the affected area and immediately dissolves ~ Lunatic Udongein	Game; Imperishable Night BGM - Lunatic Eyes ~ Invisible Full Moon (arrangement by IOSYS)
34-1	Help me, ERINNNNNN!!	Game; Imperishable Night BGM - Flight of the Bamboo Cutter ~ Lunatic Princess (arrangement by COOL&CREATE)
34-2 (35)	Millennial Gensokyo 〜History of the Moon	Game; Imperishable Night BGM
36	Little Busters!	Game; Little Busters! opening theme
37	1000% SPARKING!	Anime; Negima!? opening theme
37-2 (38)	Yūki Vs. Iji	Musical; Prince of Tennis insert song
37-3 (39)	You are the Prince of Tennis	Musical; Prince of Tennis insert song
40	Agent Departs at Night	Game; THE IDOLM@STER insert song
41	Native Faith	Game; Mountain of Faith BGM
42-1	true my heart	Game; Nursery Rhyme opening theme
42-2 (43)	Kero⑨destiny	Game; Mountain of Faith BGM - Native Faith (arrangement by Silver Forest)
44	Yatta	Song; by Happa-tai; originally shown as a sketch on the comedy show Adventures of a Laughing Dog
45	Miku Miku ni Shite Ageru♪	Web Original; composition by ika for the Vocaloid Hatsune Miku
46	Let's Go! Onmyōji	Game; Shin Gōketsuji Ichizoku: Bonnō Kaihō insert song
ED1-0	Let's Go! Onmyōji	Game; Shin Gōketsuji Ichizoku: Bonnō Kaihō insert song
ED1-1 (22)	Marisa Stole The Precious Thing	Previously used within the medley.
ED1-2 (25)	Omoide wa Okkusenman!	Previously used within the medley.
ED1-3 (27)	Hare Hare Yukai	Previously used within the medley.
ED1-4 (2)	Ne-Ni-Ge de Risetto!	Previously used within the medley.
ED1-5 (45)	Miku Miku ni Shite Ageru♪	Previously used within the medley.
ED1-6 (5)	Kirby's Gourmet Race	Previously used within the medley.
ED1-7 (23)	U.N. Owen Was Her?	Previously used within the medley.
ED1-8 (43)	Kero⑨destiny	Previously used within the medley.
ED2-1 (45)	Miku Miku ni Shite Ageru♪	Previously used within the medley.
ED2-2 (46)	Let's Go! Onmyōji	Previously used within the medley.
47	Air on the G String	Song; by Johann Sebastian Bach; a song Nico Nico Douga uses to replace deleted videos

=== Nico Nico Douga Ryūseimusume ===
Nico Nico Douga Ryūseimusume (ニコニコ動画流星娘, Nico Nico Douga Ryūseimusume), a shortened arrangement of Nico Nico Douga Ryūseigun
#	Song title	Source
0	Announcement Jingle	Song; the song Nico Nico Douga uses to notify its users of an announcement
1	STAR RISE	Anime; Bamboo Blade ending theme
2	Ne-Ni-Ge de Risetto!	Anime; Lucky Star Tsukasa Hiiragi character song
3-1	Hanamaru☆Sensation	Anime; Kodomo no Jikan ending theme
3-2 (4)	Caramelldansen	Song; by Caramell; animation sequence from Popotan
5	Stops at the affected area and immediately dissolves ~ Lunatic Udongein	Game; Imperishable Night BGM - Lunatic Eyes ~ Invisible Full Moon (arrangement by IOSYS)
6-1	nowhere	Anime; Madlax insert song
6-2 (7)	Ievan Polkka	Song; by Loituma
8	Balalaika	Anime; Kirarin Revolution opening theme
9	Danjō	Song; by Tarō
10	The Last Wolf Suite	Anime; Rurouni Kenshin BGM
11	Asu he no Hōkō	Game; Muv-Luv Alternative opening theme
12	Air Man ga Taosenai	Game; Mega Man 2 BGM (original song; arrangement by Sera/Tetsukuzuokiba)
13	Yuki, Muon, Madobe Nite	Anime; The Melancholy of Haruhi Suzumiya Yuki Nagato character song
14	Marisa Stole The Precious Thing	Game; Perfect Cherry Blossom BGM - Doll Judgment ~ The Girl who Plays with People's Shapes (arrangement by IOSYS)
15	Omoide wa Okkusenman!	Game; Mega Man 2 Dr. Wily Stage 1 BGM (arrangement by Blue Fang (蒼い牙, Aoi Kiba))
16-1	God knows...	Anime; The Melancholy of Haruhi Suzumiya insert song
16-2(17)	Joint	Anime; Shakugan no Shana II opening theme
18-1	Hare Hare Yukai	Anime; The Melancholy of Haruhi Suzumiya ending theme
18-2(19)	Yatta	Song; by Happa-tai; originally shown as a sketch on the comedy show Adventures of a Laughing Dog
20	Miku Miku ni Shite Ageru♪	Web Original; composition by ika for the Vocaloid Hatsune Miku
21	Let's Go! Onmyōji	Game; Shin Gōketsuji Ichizoku: Bonnō Kaihō insert song

Although not officially in this version of the medley, the melodies of the songs Montagues and Capulets (Dance of the Knights) and You are the Prince of Tennis from The Prince of Tennis musicals can still be heard.

=== Nanairo no Nico Nico Douga ===
Nanairo no Nico Nico Douga (七色のニコニコ動画, Nanairo no Nico Nico Douga)
#	Song title	Source
1	Black Rock Shooter	Web Original; composition by ryo/supercell for the Vocaloid Hatsune Miku
2	Heavenly Star	Song; by Genki Rockets
3	Do-Dai	Game; THE IDOLM@STER song
4-1	Minagi Has Come (みwなwぎwっwてwきwたwww （篠笛禁断症状L5）, Minagitte Kita (Shinobue Kindanshōjō L5)	Song; by ShimashimaP
4-2 (5)	Under My Skin	Song; by Paffendorf feat. Leyla de Vaar
6-1	Night of Knights	Game; Phantasmagoria of Flower View BGM - Flowering Night (arrangement by Beat Mario)
6-2 (7)	Dancing Samurai	Web Original; composition by KanimisoP for the Vocaloid Gackpoid
8	Sand Canyon	Game; Kirby's Dream Land 3 BGM
9	Sky High	Game; Kirby Super Star BGM
10	Pop Star	Game; Kirby 64: The Crystal Shards BGM
11	Got The Groove	Song; by SM-Trax
12	Septette for the Dead Princess	Game; The Embodiment of Scarlet Devil BGM
13	Bad Apple!! feat. nomico	Game; Lotus Land Story BGM - Bad Apple!! (arranged by Alstroemeria Records)
14	Ora Tokyo sa Igu da	Song; by Ikuzo Yoshi
15	RAINBOW GIRL	Web Original; song originated from 2channel
16	Starry Sky	Song; by capsule
17	Hello Windows	Remix; Microsoft Windows XP start up music remix (arrangement by Hige Driver)
18	Saikyō Pare Parade	Radio; Haruhi Suzumiya radio show opening theme
19	Sora	Game; THE IDOLM@STER song
20	celluloid	Web Original; composition by baker for the Vocaloid Hatsune Miku
21	The Disappearance of Hatsune Miku	Web Original; composition by cosMo for the Vocaloid Hatsune Miku
22-1	Lion	Anime; Macross Frontier opening theme
22-2 (21)	The Disappearance of Hatsune Miku	Previously used within the medley.
23	Seikan Hikō	Anime; Macross Frontier insert song
24	Nihon no Mikata -Nevada Kara Kimashita-	Song; by Yazima Beauty Salon
25	promise	Song; by Kohmi Hirose
26	Soul's Refrain	Anime; Evangelion: Death and Rebirth theme
27	World is Mine	Web Original; composition by ryo/supercell for the Vocaloid Hatsune Miku
28	Beloved Tomboyish Girl	Game; The Embodiment of Scarlet Devil BGM
29-1	TOWN	Game; THE IDOLM@STER BGM
29-2 (30)	PoPiPo	Web Original; composition by LamazeP for the Vocaloid Hatsune Miku
31	Mizonokuchi Taiyou Zoku	Anime; Astro Fighter Sunred opening theme
32	Ponyo on the Cliff by the Sea	Anime; Ponyo theme
33	Hakata no Shio	Advertising; Hakata no Shio commercial jingle
34	smooooch・∀・	Game; from beatmaniaIIDX 16 EMPRESS's song collection
35	Double Lariat	Web Original; composition by AgoanikiP for the Vocaloid Luka Megurine
36	Tewi! ~Eien Tewi ver.~	Game; Imperishable Night BGM - Cinderella Cage ~Kagome-Kagome (arrangement by Shūsan (Sekkenya))
37	Roshin Yūkai -Meltdown-	Web Original; composition by iroha(sasaki) for the Vocaloid Rin Kagamine
38	Ojamajo Carnival!!	Anime; Ojamajo Doremi opening theme
39	Blue Flame	Musical; Prince of Tennis musical insert song
40	The Regulars	Musical; Prince of Tennis musical insert song
41	Hammer Melody	Game; Donkey Kong power-up music
42	RED ZONE	Game;from beatmania IIDXREDs song collection
ED1	Konayuki	Song; by Remioromen
ED2	ENDLESS RAIN	Song; by X Japan
ED3	Uninstall	Anime; Bokurano opening theme
ED4	true my heart	Game; Nursery Rhyme opening theme
ED5	Let's Go! Onmyōji	Game; Shin Gōketsuji Ichizoku: Bonnō Kaihō insert song
ED6	Marisa Stole The Precious Thing	Game; Perfect Cherry Blossom BGM - Doll Judgment ~ The Girl who Plays with People's Shapes (arrangement by IOSYS)
ED7	Futari no Mojipittan	Game; Kotoba no Puzzle: Mojipittan theme song
ED8	SKILL	Game; 2nd Super Robot Wars Alpha opening theme
ED9	Omoide wa Okkusenman!	Game; Mega Man 2 Dr. Wily Stage 1 BGM (arrangement by Blue Fang (蒼い牙, Aoi Kiba))
ED10	Tsurupettan	Remix; Flight of the Bamboo Cutter ~ Lunatic Princess, Let's Go! Onmyōji, Futari no Mojipittan remix (arrangement by Silver Forest)
ED11	Hare Hare Yukai	Anime; The Melancholy of Haruhi Suzumiya ending theme
ED12	Gacha Gacha Cute - Figu@mate	Game; Figu@mate opening theme
ED13	Agent Departs at Night	Game; THE IDOLM@STER insert song
ED14	You are the Prince of Tennis	Musical; Prince of Tennis insert song
ED15	you	Game; Higurashi No Naku Koro Ni Kai: Meakashi-hen ending theme
ED16	Motteke! Sailor Fuku	Anime; Lucky Star opening theme
ED17	Help me, ERINNNNNN!!	Game; Imperishable Night BGM - Flight of the Bamboo Cutter ~ Lunatic Princess (arrangement by COOL&CREATE)
ED18	GO MY WAY!!	Game; THE IDOLM@STER dance song
ED19	Air Man ga Taosenai	Game; Mega Man 2 BGM (original song; arrangement by Sera/Tetsukuzuokiba)
ED20	Melt	Web Original; composition by ryo (supercell) for the Vocaloid Hatsune Miku
ED21	Little Busters!	Game; Little Busters! opening theme
ED22	God knows...	Anime; The Melancholy of Haruhi Suzumiya insert song
ED23	Cheetah Man 2 BGM	Game; Cheetah Man 2 BGM
ED24	"Genesis of Aquarion"	Anime; Genesis of Aquarion opening theme
ED25	Miku Miku ni Shite Ageru♪	Web Original; composition by ika for the Vocaloid Hatsune Miku
ED26	Caramelldansen	Song; by Caramell; animation sequence from Popotan
ED27	U.N. Owen was Her?	Game; Embodiment of Scarlet Devil BGM
ED28	Makka na Chikai	Anime; Buso Renkin opening theme
43	Don't say "lazy"	Anime; K-On! ending theme
*	Announcement Jingle	Song; the song Nico Nico Douga uses to notify its users of an announcement
44	Reach Out To The Truth	Game; Persona 4 BGM

The last section (ED1 - ED28) is also called "HEROES".

=== Nanairo no Nico Nico Douga (mobile rainbow mix) ===
Nanairo no Nico Nico Douga (mobile rainbow mix) (七色のニコニコ動画(mobile rainbow mix), Nanairo no Nico Nico Douga), a shortened arrangement of Nanairo no Nico Nico Douga
#	Song title	Source
1	Heavenly Star	Song; by Genki Rockets
2	Under My Skin	Song; by Paffendorf feat. Leyla de Vaar
3	Nihon no Mikata -Nevada Kara Kimashita-	Song; by Yazima Beauty Salon
4	Ponyo on the Cliff by the Sea	Anime; Ponyo theme
5	Hakata no Shio	Advertising; Hakata no Shio commercial jingle
6	Saikyō Pare Parade	Radio; Haruhi Suzumiya radio show opening theme
7	Got The Groove	Song; by SM-Trax
(7-2)	Beloved Tomboyish Girl	Game; The Embodiment of Scarlet Devil BGM
8	Cirno's Perfect Math Class	Game; The Embodiment of Scarlet Devil BGM - Beloved Tomboyish Girl (arrangement by IOSYS)
9	Seikan Hikō	Anime; Macross Frontier insert song
10	Starry Sky	Song; by capsule
11	Blue Flame	Musical; Prince of Tennis musical insert song
12	Ora Tokyo sa Igu da	Song; by Ikuzo Yoshi
13	Mizonokuchi Taiyou Zoku	Anime; Tentai Senshi Sun Red opening theme
14	The Regulars	Musical; Prince of Tennis musical insert song
15	Tamashii no Refrain	Anime; Evangelion: Death and Rebirth theme
16	promise	Song; by Kohmi Hirose
17	Lion	Anime; Macross Frontier opening theme
18	Don't say "lazy"	Anime; K-On! ending theme

=== Suite: Nico Nico Douga Revision ===
Suite: Nico Nico Douga Revision (組曲『ニコニコ動画』改, Kumikyoku Nico Nico Douga Kai), a remix of Suite: Nico Nico Douga.
#	Song title	Source
1	Agent Departs at Night	Game; THE IDOLM@STER insert song
2	Hare Hare Yukai	Anime; The Melancholy of Haruhi Suzumiya ending theme
3	Stops at the affected area and immediately dissolves ~ Lunatic Udongein	Game; Imperishable Night BGM - Lunatic Eyes ~ Invisible Full Moon (arrangement by IOSYS)
4-1	Help me, ERINNNNNN!!	Game; Imperishable Night BGM - Flight of the Bamboo Cutter ~ Lunatic Princess (arrangement by COOL&CREATE)
4-2 (3)	Stops at the affected area and immediately dissolves ~ Lunatic Udongein	Previously used within the medley.
5	nowhere	Anime; Madlax insert song
6	Fang of Critias	Anime; Yu-Gi-Oh! Duel Monsters BGM
7	GONG	Game; Super Robot Wars Alpha 3 opening theme
8-1	Beware the Forest's Mushrooms	Game; Super Mario RPG BGM
8-2 (7)	GONG	Previously used within the medley.
9	Butter-Fly	Anime; Digimon Adventure opening theme
10-1	Makka na Chikai	Anime; Buso Renkin opening theme
10-2 (9)	Butter-Fly	Previously used within the medley.
11-1	Air Man ga Taosenai	Game; Mega Man 2 BGM (original song; arrangement by Sera/Tetsukuzuokiba)
11-2 (12)	Yūki Vs. Iji	Mentioned below.
12	Yūki Vs. Iji	Musical; Prince of Tennis insert song
13	Uninstall	Anime; Bokurano opening theme
14	Tori no Uta	Game; Air opening theme
15	you	Game; Higurashi No Naku Koro Ni Kai: Meakashi-hen ending theme
16-1	Marisa Stole The Precious Thing	Game; Perfect Cherry Blossom BGM - Doll Judgment ~ The Girl who Plays with People's Shapes (arrangement by IOSYS)
16-2 (15)	you	Previously used within the medley.
17-1	Omoide wa Okkusenman!	Game; Mega Man 2 Dr. Wily Stage 1 BGM (arrangement by Blue Fang (蒼い牙, Aoi Kiba))
17-2 (16)	Marisa Stole The Precious Thing	Previously used within the medley.
18-1 (17)	Omoide wa Okkusenman!	Previously used within the medley.
18-2	God knows...	Anime; The Melancholy of Haruhi Suzumiya insert song
19	Motteke! Sailor Fuku	Anime; Lucky Star opening theme
20	Gacha Gacha Hertz ~ Figu@radio	Game; Figu@mate Carnival opening theme
21	"Genesis of Aquarion"	Anime; Genesis of Aquarion opening theme
22	Futari no Mojipittan	Game; Kotoba no Puzzle: Mojipittan theme song
23	Tsurupettan	Remix; Flight of the Bamboo Cutter ~ Lunatic Princess, Let's Go! Onmyōji, Futari no Mojipittan remix (arrangement by Silver Forest)
24	Here we go!	Game; Super Mario World BGM
25	true my heart	Game; Nursery Rhyme opening theme
26	kiss my lips	Song; by ave;new feat. Saori Sakura
27	RODEO MACHINE	PV; Sukoshi Tanoshikunaru Douga by HALFBY
28	DRAGON QUEST Overture	Game; Dragon Quest theme song (lyrics from Kimi ga Yo or the translator's national anthem when translated into other languages outside Japan; for example, the Hebrew version uses lyrics from Hatikva instead)
29	FINAL FANTASY	Game; Final Fantasy theme song
30	Gacha Gacha Cute - Figu@mate	Game; Figu@mate opening theme.
30-1 (29)	FINAL FANTASY	Previously used within the medley.
31	You are the Prince of Tennis	Musical; Prince of Tennis insert song
32	Let's Go! Onmyōji	Game; Shin Gōketsuji Ichizoku: Bonnō Kaihō insert song
33	Marisa Stole The Precious Thing	Previously used within the medley.
34	Omoide wa Okkusenman!	Previously used within the medley.
35	Hare Hare Yukai	Previously used within the medley.
36	Ne-Ni-Ge de Risetto!	Anime; Lucky Star Tsukasa Hiiragi character song
37	Kirby's Gourmet Race	Game; Kirby Super Star Duel! Gourmet Race stage BGM
38	U.N. Owen Was Her?	Game; The Embodiment of Scarlet Devil BGM
39	Kero⑨destiny	Game; Mountain of Faith BGM - Native Faith (arrangement by Silver Forest)
40	Miku Miku ni Shite Ageru♪	Web Original; composition by ika for the Vocaloid Hatsune Miku
41	Let's Go! Onmyōji	Previously used within the medley.

=== Super Suite: Nico Nico Douga ===
Super Suite: Nico Nico Douga (超組曲『ニコニコ動画』, Chou Kumikyoku Nico Nico Douga)
#	Song title	Source
1	Black Rock Shooter	Web Original; composition by ryo/supercell for the Vocaloid Hatsune Miku
2	Heavenly Star	Song; by Genki Rockets, premiered in Lumines 2
3	STAR RISE	Anime; Bamboo Blade ending theme
4	Caramelldansen	Song; by Caramell; animation sequence from Popotan
5	nowhere	Anime; Madlax insert song
6	Ievan Polkka	Song; by Loituma
7	Bad Apple!! feat. nomico	Game; Lotus Land Story BGM - Bad Apple!! (arranged by Alstroemeria Records)
8	Ora Tokyo sa Igu da	Song; by Ikuzo Yoshi
9	Danjō	Song; by Tarō
10	Makka na Chikai	Anime; Buso Renkin opening theme
11	Air Man ga Taosenai	Game; Mega Man 2 BGM (original song; arrangement by Sera/Tetsukuzuokiba)
12	Melt	Web Original; composition by ryo/supercell for the Vocaloid Hatsune Miku
13	"Genesis of Aquarion"	Anime; Genesis of Aquarion opening theme
14	Roshin Yūkai -Meltdown-	Web Original; composition by iroha(sasaki) for the Vocaloid Rin Kagamine
15	U.N. Owen was Her?	Game; The Embodiment of Scarlet Devil BGM
16	Tamashii no Refrain	Anime; Evangelion: Death and Rebirth theme
17	promise	Song; by Kohmi Hirose
18	Uninstall	Anime; Bokurano opening theme
19	you	Game; Higurashi No Naku Koro Ni Kai: Meakashi-hen ending theme
20	Marisa Stole The Precious Thing	Game; Perfect Cherry Blossom BGM - Doll Judgment ~ The Girl who Plays with People's Shapes (arrangement by IOSYS)
21	Seikan Hikō	Anime; Macross Frontier insert song
22	Omoide wa Okkusenman!	Game; Mega Man 2 Dr. Wily Stage 1 BGM (arrangement by Blue Fang (蒼い牙, Aoi Kiba))
23	God knows...	Anime; The Melancholy of Haruhi Suzumiya insert song
24	Hare Hare Yukai	Anime; The Melancholy of Haruhi Suzumiya ending theme
25	Miku Miku ni Shite Ageru♪	Web Original; composition by ika for the Vocaloid Hatsune Miku
26	Let's Go! Onmyōji	Game; Shin Gōketsuji Ichizoku: Bonnō Kaihō insert song
27	You are the Prince of Tennis	Musical; Prince of Tennis insert song

== Others ==
On 26 December 2007, Lantis published らき☆すたRe-Mix002〜『ラキスタノキワミ、アッー』【してやんよ】〜, a "mixed music collection" based on Lucky Star. One of the songs in the collection, 「組曲『らき☆すた動画』」, was to pay tribute to the creativity of Kumikyoku Nico Nico Douga.

On 5 March 2008, the same company published a similar music CD called “Lantis Kumikyoku”.

Somewhere around 19 October 2008, a Super Mario World ROM hacker created an automatic level in the game that would play the song using sound effects from the game (with the original song playing in the background) The video has been viewed over 2 million times across all of the reuploads of the video on YouTube, and is an important part of the Super Mario World ROM Hacking community.

In 2012, a team of users on YouTube collaborated to create "8 Sides of Nico Nico Douga", a remix of Nanairo Nico Nico Douga using audio samples from Jack Black's appearance on Sesame Street. The second part of "RAINBOW GIRL" was replaced with "Karate" by Tenacious D.

== Videos ==
Original videos

- 「ニコニコ動画中毒の方へ贈る一曲」
- 「組曲『ニコニコ動画』」
  - 「組曲『ニコニコ動画』」 - Transloaded to YouTube
- 「ニコニコ動画物語.wav」
- 「ニコニコ動画流星群」
- 「七色のニコニコ動画」
- 組曲『ニコニコ動画』改
- 「超組曲『ニコニコ動画』」

Cover videos

- 組曲『NICONICO動畫』、台灣人大合唱（PTT）
- 中央大學歌謠祭「組曲『NICONICO動畫』」
- NICONICO動畫『裏組曲』(衍生作品之一)
- 組曲『NICONICO動畫』中文版 ver.elielin - YouTube (publicly viewable)

== See also ==
- Nico Nico Douga
