= Let's Go! Onmyōji =

- Hikomaro Yabeno, main character of Let's Go! Onmyōji
- Japanese: レッツゴー!陰陽師
- Starring: Hikomaro Yabeno (VA. Toshikazu Tanaka), Kotohime (VA. Momoeika), Bōzu Dancers
- Music by: Toshikazu Tanaka
- Distributed by: Atlus
- Release date: March 6, 2007
- Running time: 5:20
- Country: Japan
- Language: Japanese

Let's Go! Onmyōji (Japanese: レッツゴー!陰陽師) is a music video attached in Matrimelee, a 2006 video game of the Power Instinct series. It is also the oldest video uploaded to Niconico Douga that is alive today. The 5-minute-and-20-second video features five characters dancing and praying to drive away evil spirits, who are Hikomaro Yabeno (矢部野彦麿) the Onmyōji, Kotohime (琴姫) the Miko, and three unnamed monks. The song is written by Toshikazu Tanaka, a video game composer.

On 6 March 2007 (JST), Makoto Nakano, engineer of Dwango, uploaded the video to Niconico Douga, obtained one of the first identifier of "sm9" in the platform. With its long history for the platform and special style, Let's Go! Onmyōji is one of the most-viewed Niconico Douga videos with lots of derivative works.

== Background ==
Let's Go! Onmyōji is a music video inserted in Shin Gōketsuji Ichizoku: Bonnō Kaihō (新・豪血寺一族 煩悩解放), PlayStation 2 port version of Matrimelee in the Power Instinct series. Developed by Atlus, the series is known by unusual settings compared to other fighting games. The music is developed by Noise Factory (ノイズファクトリー) with Toshikazu Tanaka as the songwriter.

On 12 December 2006, Niconico Douga was established as "ニコニコ動画(仮)". The platform renamed "ニコニコ動画(β)" and "ニコニコ動画(γ)" on 15 January 2007, and 6 March 2007. The platform is founded by Nobuo Kawakami (川上量生), with the support from Hiroyuki Nishimura, director of Niwango. According to Nishimura, he had always planned a website allowing viewers to post comments in real time while watching the video.

On 6 March 2007, at 0:33:00 p.m. JST (Note: The uploading time is indicated as "2007-03-05T15:33:00.000Z"), Makoto Nakano, engineer of Dwango with the username "Nakano" (中の), uploaded the video to Niconico Douga, obtained one of the first identifier of "sm9" in the platform. It is the oldest video uploaded to Niconico Douga that is alive today. As of 2026, the most recent video from Nakano is "【ギャラ子β版】ANOTHER:WORLD (アニメversion)【デモ曲】" uploaded in 2012.

== Content ==
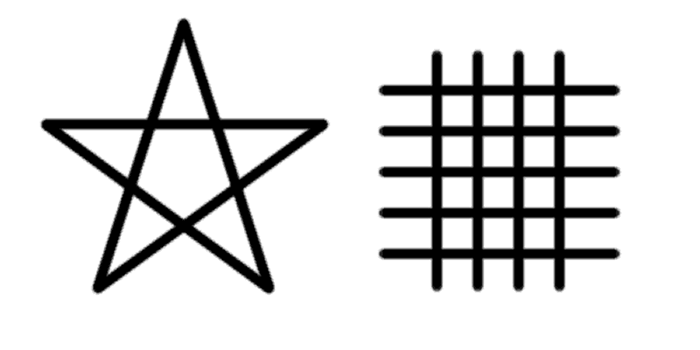
Doman-Seman mentioned in the video

Let's Go! Onmyōji is approximately 5 minutes and 20 seconds long with five characters, who are Hikomaro Yabeno (矢部野彦麿, VA: Toshikazu Tanaka (Note: under the name "Dencyuū" (Japanese: でんちゅう))) the Onmyōji, Kotohime (琴姫, VA: Momoeika) the Miko, and three unnamed monks known as "Bōzu Dancers" (Note: Japanese: 坊主ダンサーズ).

At beginning, the narrator described that in Heisei, the time when people can settle everything by science, depressed mind developed evil spirits that can't even settled by science, and Yabeno urged to fight against them. The film's structure is as follows: the five characters first start singing and dancing, saying that people may ask Onmyōji to drive away evil spirits if they are plagued by spirits or supernatural phenomena. Then, Yabeno describes how depressed mind developed evil spirits, and Kotohime will start singing and dancing to pray for dispelling evil. Finally, the video starts from five characters singing and dancing again. The pattern repeated serveral times until Yabeno saying "rest in peace". (Note: Japanese: 成仏しろよ, lit. 'becoming a Buddha')

== Reaction ==
As the oldest video on Niconico Douga, Let's Go! Onmyōji is one of the most-played video at the platform, and has been seen as the video that represents Niconico Douga that is described as "attractive". It is also compared with other famous videos on the platform such as Kumikyoku Nico Nico Douga, Omoide wa Okkusenman!, Ran Ran Ru, and Air Man ga Taosenai. It garnered 20 million views on Niconico in 2021. Infoseek described the video as a "benchmark video" (Note: Japanese: 基準動画) with "creative work," "danmaku", "MAD", and "promotion/advertising." While Noise Factory noticed the video's unauthorised uploading, they consent tacitly since "lots of people enjoyed it" (Note: Japanese: 大勢の人に楽しんでもらえたから).

=== Derivative works ===
With the popularity gained, derivative works of Let's Go! Onmyōji have emerged online, such as Shirakami Fubuki, Suō Sango, and FUWAMOCO, who have covered the music or imitated the dances in the video.

In 2007, after discussions with Noise Factory, Niconico Animation released related ringtones and CDs. The initial expected sales were 1,000 to 2,000 copies, but the final sales were about 10,000 copies. In 2008, after signing a copyright agreement, Niconico Douga included the music as the first track in their 2008 compilation album CD de Iitemite. ~Niconico Douga Selection~. In 2025, CASSETRON announced the release of a mini CD and vinyl record single of "Let's Go! Onmyoji". The single also includes "Let's Go! Pachinko Onmyōji".

In 2023, Let's Go! Onmyōji collaborated with "Yokai Rumble!" (Note: Japanese: あやかしランブル！), a mobile game developed by DMM GAMES, to release a Reiwa version of Let's Go! Onmyōji. In addition to changing "Heisei" to "Reiwa" in the original lines, it also drew a picture of Yabeno 16 years later. In addition, Nippon Ham and Nissin Foods released an advertisement parodying "Let's Go! Onmyōji", featuring SUWEHIROGARIS as the actor.

In 2024, Niconico Douga was taken offline due to a cyberattack. On August 5 at its relaunch, Hyakka Ryouran (Note: Japanese: 百花繚乱) uploaded the video "Let's Go! Onmyōji: Ancient Legend Collaboration" (Note: Japanese: レッツゴー！陰陽師 古伝説コラボ) inviting several users to participate in creations related to "Let's Go! Onmyōji". Notable participants in the video included ZUN, Hiroyuki Nishimura, and Toshikazu Tanaka.

== See also ==
- Me at the zoo
