= Air Man ga Taosenai =

- Team.Nekokan's Comiket CD cover

Song by Team.Nekokan

from the album CD de Kiite Mite.: Nico Nico Douga Selection
- Language: Japanese
- Published: May 26, 2007
- Released: July 1, 2007
- Recorded: June 1, 2007
- Genre: Dōjin
- Length: 3:50
- Songwriters: "Seramikaru" (せらみかる, Seramikaru)

"Air Man ga Taosenai" (エアーマンが倒せない, Eāman ga Taosenai; "Can't Beat Air Man") is a dōjin song and Internet meme from Japan. The song itself describes a player trying to defeat the boss character Air Man (and later in the song Wood Man) in Mega Man 2. Unlike the earlier song "Omoide wa Okkusenman!" which uses a song originally composed for Mega Man 2 as its melody, "Air Man ga Taosenai" is an original composition by an individual only known as "Seramikaru" (せらみかる, Seramikaru).

== History ==
The song was first posted on Nico Nico Douga on May 26, 2007. An extended vocal version was performed by dōjin music group Team.Nekokan (Team.ねこかん[猫], Team.Nekokan [Neko]) was later posted to their website and YouTube on June 1, 2007, and later to Nico Nico Douga on July 1. This version was a collaboration with fellow dōjin musicians SoundCYCLONE and Scinicade. An English version titled "Can't Beat Air Man" was posted to both Nico Nico Douga and YouTube on December 23, 2007. "Air Man ga Taosenai" was incorporated into the second of the Kumikyoku Nico Nico Douga videos and has been included in all but one of the subsequent mashups.

The lyrics detail a video game player's difficulties with Mega Man 2, specifically with the vanishing block portion of Heat Man's stage. The player notes he could get past the difficult section easily if he had Item #2, which is obtained by defeating Air Man, but he also has difficulty with that boss, even when he holds off using the health restoring E-Tank until the last moment. The player then notes that Air Man would be much easier if he had the Leaf Shield weapon, but he has just as much trouble defeating Wood Man. Ironically, one of Wood Man's weaknesses is Heat Man's Atomic Fire weapon, which of course is of no help to the player since he cannot reach Heat Man to begin with.

The song has been translated into English and covered several times since it was first released. Among the more widely known translations is one done by Kiwi Kenobi, which debuted on YouTube in July 2008 and gained considerable popularity.

The song was used as entrance music for professional wrestling tag team The Golden Lovers (Kota Ibushi and Kenny Omega) in DDT Pro-Wrestling, with a special version of the music video produced by Team.Nekokan.

== Commercial release ==
Team.Nekokan's version of "Air Man ga Taosenai" was distributed at Comiket on a CD along with an acoustic version of this song. Team. Nekokan's original version and its instrumental are available through the iTunes Store. It is also included on the Nico Nico Douga album CD de Kiite Mite.: Nico Nico Douga Selection (CDで聞いてみて。～ニコニコ動画せれくちょん～, CD de Kiite Mite. ~Niko Niko Dōga Serekuchon~; "Try to Listen to the CD.") released July 9, 2008. A cover version arranged by Ryu☆ and sung by zaki was released on the CD Exit Trance Presents Umauma Dekiru Trance o Tsukuttemita 4: Goran no Arisama da yo (EXIT TRANCE PRESENTS ウマウマできるトランスを作ってみた 4 ごらんの有様だよ♥) on April 1, 2009.
