= Zoome =

Japanese video hosting service (2007–2011)

zoome
- Website type: Video hosting service
- Owners: zoome Co., Ltd.
- Website: http://www.zoome.jp/
- Registration: Yes
- Launched: January 30, 2007
- Current status: Closed on August 31, 2011

zoome Co., Ltd. zoome株式会社
- Type: Kabushiki kaisha Subsidiary company of ACCA Networks Co., Ltd.
- Industry: Internet media service, video hosting service
- Founded: June 2, 2008
- Defunct: 30 September 2011
- Headquarters: Yūrakuchō, Tokyo
- Key people: Jumpei Kudo: President & Representative Director
- Website: http://www.zoome.jp/

zoome (ズーミー, lit. "zoom me") was a video hosting service in Japan managed by zoome Co., Ltd. (zoome株式会社).

The name is a combination of "zoom" and "me", and means "My broadcasting station & community". zoome supported H.264/MPEG-4 AVC for the first time by a video hosting service in Japan. The site was the second largest video hosting service in Japan, after Nico Nico Douga.

The site was called a "CGM video hosting site" and "The third force" different from YouTube and Nico Nico Douga.

== Features ==
These functions were all free for the zoome user, unlike Nico Nico Douga.

- H.264/MPEG-4 AVC and HE-AAC highest video quality in Japan: The H.264 video (maximum bit rate 1.5 Mbit/s) and HE-AAC (unrestricted bit rate) can be opened to the public due to no deterioration.
- My Page: zoome mounts SNS. After registration, new users can host videos and diaries visible to the public.
- My Clip: zoome user lists a favorite video.
- Circle: zoome user can make "Circle" over which the user who has the same preference, and participate in other users' circle.
- Telop Command: This is a limited function of the video player of the circle. This is so-called, an upgraded version of Uploader comments of Nico Nico Douga.
- Ranking: Many popular videos can be confirmed by various standards.
- zoome mobile: Cell phone only.

== History ==
zoome was launched by ACCA Networks on January 30, 2007. However, zoome was overshadowed by Nico Nico Douga, which was launched at the same time, and zoome lurked in an unremarkable state until the end of the year.

zoome's popularity boomed via Hatsune Miku at the end of 2007. Nico Nico Douga, the fostering site of the voice synthesis software, became involved in a scandal which caused some of its members to move to zoome. Dwango, the owner of Nico Nico Douga, had registered the copyright of a Hatsune Miku song to the copyright management group JASRAC under the name "Dwango", without permission from the song's author, sparking outrage among Vocaloid fans. Sometime before the scandal broke out, ACCA had opened a Vocaloid video hosting circle TDKI (投稿動画向上委員会, Tōkō Dōga Kōjō Iinkai; lit. "TDKI (Video hosting improvement committee)"), which was officially recognized by Hatsune Miku's developer, Crypton Future Media. The scandal on Nico Nico Douga and the official recognition in zoome lured many members away from Nico Nico Douga to zoome. As a result, Hatsune Miku videos became one of the mainstays of zoome, and zoome became a leading competitor able to challenge Nico Nico Douga's monopoly of the video hosting service industry in Japan.

In addition, events of 2008 greatly aided zoome in its development. Stage6 was closed and the majority of the Japanese Stage6 users migrated to zoome. Also, zoome continued to benefit from various happenings within Nico Nico Douga. Particularly worthy of note was when Dwango announced the complete purge of anime MAD Movies from Nico Nico Douga in July. Many creators of MAD Movies moved to zoome because of this announcement.

On June 2, 2008, the zoome site split from ACCA Networks and became its subsidiary, zoome Co., Ltd. On July 21, 2011, zoome announced that it would shut down all its services on August 31, 2011.

== See also ==
- NicoNico
- H.264/MPEG-4 AVC
- HE-AAC
- Hatsune Miku
- Vocaloid
- ACCA Networks: Stockholder of zoome Co., Ltd.
- Crypton Future Media: Collaboration with zoome
- NTT Communications Corp: Stockholder of ACCA Networks
