= Perfect Cherry Blossom =

2003 bullet hell video game

Touhou Youyoumu ~ Perfect Cherry Blossom
- CD-ROM cover art, featuring a silhouette of Yukari Yakumo
- Developer: Team Shanghai Alice
- Publisher: Team Shanghai Alice
- Composer: Team Shanghai Alice
- Series: Touhou Project
- Platform: Windows
- Release: JP: 17 August 2003 (Note: Perfect Cherry Blossom was sold on the final day of Comiket 64.)
- Genres: Scrolling shooter, bullet hell
- Mode: Single-player

Touhou Youyoumu ~ Perfect Cherry Blossom (Japanese: 東方妖々夢 〜 Perfect Cherry Blossom; lit. "Bewitching Eastern Dream") is a 2003 vertically scrolling shooter bullet hell video game developed by Team Shanghai Alice. It is the seventh game in the Touhou Project series. Playable characters include returning protagonists Reimu Hakurei and Marisa Kirisame, with Sakuya Izayoi featuring in her first playable appearance. The story centers around the chosen heroine traveling to Gensokyo's Netherworld to stop Gensokyo from being stuck in an eternal state of winter when spring fails to arrive.

The full game was first released on August 17, 2003, at Comiket 64. The game introduces many gameplay changes over its predecessor Embodiment of Scarlet Devil, many of which would become staples of subsequent Touhou Project entries, including the ability to visualise the player's own hitbox.

== Gameplay ==
Screenshot of stage 5

Perfect Cherry Blossom is a vertically scrolling shoot 'em up bullet hell game. Similarly to the previous game, Embodiment of Scarlet Devil, the game consists of six regular stages with four levels of difficulty. Perfect Cherry Blossom also features a practice mode to play through previously completed stages, a replay mode for watching saved game replays, and a music room to listen to the game's soundtrack and view ZUN's comments on each song.

If the player completes the game without using a continue, they are shown the "good ending" of their particular shot type, and unlock an additional "Extra Stage"; otherwise, they are revealed a "bad ending" and are unable to save a replay. Unlike the previous game, the player is not prevented from reaching Stage 6 and achieving the good ending on Easy difficulty.

The player can enter "focus mode" by holding the focus button, which slows the player character's movements, alters their shot, and shows their hitbox, making it easier to dodge enemy attacks. The player can also use bombs, which grant temporary invulnerability, clear the screen of bullets, and deal varying amount of damage to enemies depending on the shot type. The player has a limited supply of bombs per each life, with each individual shot type featuring two different bombs (one fired while unfocused, the other while focused). Upon being hit by an enemy bullet, the player can avoid losing a life by using a bomb within a small window of time (the timing determined by the chosen character), a technique known as "deathbombing."

The game offers three playable characters to choose from with two shot types each: Reimu Hakurei starts with three bombs, has the smallest hitbox, and the longest time in the game to deathbomb, with either homing amulets or strong but narrow needles. Marisa Kirisame is the fastest character, and has a lower boundary to collect all items onscreen, with strong but narrow attacks that are either vertically traveling projectiles or lasers that pierce enemies; she also starts with only two bombs. Sakuya Izayoi has the largest area in which she can graze enemy bullets and a lower Cherry point penalty for dying, and fires knives that can either lock onto enemies in front of her or have their angle manually aimed and then locked depending on the shot type; she starts with four bombs.

Throughout the course of the game, enemies drop Power Items, which increase the damage and rate of fire of the player's shot, Point Items, which increase the player's score and Point counter and grant additional lives at increasing numeric thresholds (unlike Embodiment of Scarlet Devil, in which extra lives are awarded directly based on score) and Cherry items, which contribute to the Cherry mechanic. When the player reaches maximum shot power, all bullets on-screen are canceled and converted into points; while at full power, the player can move to the top of the screen to collect all onscreen items, and any additional Power items dropped will instead be Cherry items. The player will also receive a point bonus if they can "capture" an enemy spell card: completing it without dying, bombing, running out of time, or breaking a Supernatural Border.

Perfect Cherry Blossom's game-exclusive mechanic is the "Cherry" system. Shooting enemies and collecting cherry blossom petal items dropped by enemies increases the "Cherry Points" (displayed as "Cherry" and "Cherry+" in-game), but using a bomb, dying, or failing to defeat a boss's attack before time runs out decreases it. The maximum value of Point Items is determined by the Cherry level; Point Items are worth an amount equal to the Cherry level near the top of the screen and decrease in value the lower on the screen they are collected. When a total of 50,000 "Cherry+" points are collected and the player is not currently invincible due to bomb or respawning after a lost life, a "Supernatural Border" (森羅結界, Shinra Kekkai) will be triggered, a shield that lasts for nine seconds. While active, all items are automatically collected (with Point Items giving their maximum value no matter where on the screen the player is), and the player is protected from one enemy attack. If the player is hit while the border is active, or if the player manually cancels the border by pressing the bomb button, a "Spirit Strike" (霊撃, Reigeki) is unleashed; this removes all onscreen bullets and converts them into small cherry petal items (which are worth a fixed, non-scaling amount, unlike the regular ones, which award additional Cherry for each Spell Card captured), but ends the shield prematurely (without consuming a bomb stock if the button was pressed). If the player is able to survive for the entirety of the shield's duration without being hit or breaking it manually, an additional "Border Bonus" is granted to score (as well as a very brief period of invincibility). The Cherry value has an upper bound, dictated in-game by the number depicted after the slash, which can be increased by achieving a Border Bonus or grazing (having enemy bullets reach the edge of the player hitbox) when the Supernatural Border is active. Additionally, each bullet grazed independently adds to the player's score and gives a score bonus at the end of the stage. Depending on the selected difficulty level and the initial number of lives, a multiplier bonus or penalty is applied at the end of each stage; at the end of the final stage, additional points are awarded for each remaining life and bomb in stock.

Among new features introduced in Perfect Cherry Blossom are visualizing the player's hitbox when focusing, changing a shot type's behavior more drastically when focused compared to Embodiment of Scarlet Devil, including a cursor on the bottom margin of the screen during a boss battle which tells the player where the boss is currently located, and having a consistent time in which to perform a deathbomb. Unlike the previous game, the practice mode grants the player the maximum amount of lives, and it is possible to save a replay of an attempt made through this mode. ZUN has stated those features are meant to make the game more user-friendly after observing the positive reaction and increasing fanbase of Embodiment of Scarlet Devil. Although not explicitly stated within the game itself, an additional "Phantasm Stage" is unlocked for characters that have cleared the "Extra Stage" once the player has captured 60 unique spell cards across all characters and difficulties; the Phantasm stage contains the conclusion to the game's story.

Erroneously, the version of the game's manual hosted on ZUN's website contains a mix of information from the game's earliest trial versions (such as extra lives being granted by score instead of collecting Point Items or practice mode giving player the default amount of lives) and content only present in the full release (such as unlocking the Extra Stage).

== Plot ==
=== Setting and prologue ===
In the spring of the 119th season of Gensokyo, an event later known as the Spring Snow Incident (春雪異変) occurs. Gensokyo is stuck in an eternal winter, with snowstorms continuing well into May. The three heroines, each for their own reasons, set out to resolve the incident and return spring to the land. Reimu Hakurei is motivated by the cold temperature making her life at the shrine miserable. Marisa Kirisame finds a cherry blossom petal in her home in the Forest of Magic and sets out to see if winter is affecting the outside world as well. Sakuya Izayoi is forced to act to prevent the Scarlet Devil Mansion from running out of supplies and fuel. Canonically, Reimu is the one that resolves this incident.

=== Main scenario ===
In Stage 1, "The Spring of Silvery Snow," the heroine encounters Letty Whiterock (レティ・ホワイトロック). Letty is a yōkai (later explicitly stated to be of the yuki-onna variety) who possesses the ability to manipulate cold. She attacks the heroine to protect the winter environment, which she considers her "happiness." According to official lore, her power is equivalent to the forces of nature during winter, but she becomes virtually powerless and hides in the shadows during other seasons.

Proceeding to the village of Mayohiga in Stage 2, "Black Cat of Mayohiga," the heroine faces Chen (橙), a nekomata (two-tailed cat demon). Chen serves as the shikigami to Ran Yakumo, who is herself a shikigami, making Chen a "shikigami of a shikigami." She possesses the ability to use sorcery but is notably weak to water; getting wet dispels her shikigami possession, reducing her to a regular cat youkai.

In Stage 3, "One Night in the Settlement of the Dolls," the protagonist encounters Alice Margatroid (アリス・マーガトロイド). A magician who lives in the Forest of Magic, Alice was originally a human who became a yōkai through magical training. She originally appeared as the Stage 3 boss and Extra Stage boss of the fifth Touhou Project game, Mystic Square, albeit without a surname. She is known as the "Seven-Colored Puppeteer" and possesses extreme dexterity, allowing her to manipulate multiple dolls simultaneously to perform magic. In battle, she is noted for never using her full strength, preferring to win with a slight margin to maintain the "fun" of the fight.

Passing through the cloud barrier in Stage 4, "The Cherry Blossom Barrier from Above the Clouds," the heroine attempts to enter the Netherworld. She is intercepted by Lily White (リリーホワイト), a fairy known as the "Herald of Spring" who appears to announce the coming of the season. At the gate of the Netherworld, the heroine battles the Prismriver Sisters (プリズムリバー三姉妹)—Lunasa, Merlin, and Lyrica. They are poltergeists who perform as a musical ensemble. The sisters were not born naturally but were created by the delusion of a human noble girl named Layla Prismriver after she was separated from her family; the sisters continue to exist in a mansion near the Misty Lake long after Layla's death.

In Stage 5, "Spirit Battle on the Staircase of Hakugyokurou," the heroine enters Hakugyokurō (白玉楼, lit. 'Tower of White Jade'), the residence of the Netherworld's mistress. There, she confronts Youmu Konpaku (魂魄 妖夢), the estate's gardener and fencing instructor. Youmu is a half-human, half-phantom hybrid who is constantly accompanied by a large floating phantom form; unlike normal humans, her body temperature is lower, while her phantom half is warmer. She wields two swords (a daishō): the long katana "Roukanken," (楼観剣, lit. 'watchtower sword') said to kill ten ghosts in one slash, and the short wakizashi "Hakurouken," (白楼剣, lit. 'white tower sword') which cuts through "confusion" of those it hits (described as mildly painful for humans, but causing enlightenment on other phantoms). Youmu reveals she stole Gensokyo's spring on the orders of her mistress to make the estate's cherry trees bloom. She was taught by her predecessor, Youki Konpaku (魂魄 妖忌), who mysteriously disappeared one day.

The final confrontation takes place in Stage 6, "A Maiden's Remains in the Other World." The heroine faces Yuyuko Saigyouji (西行寺 幽々子), the ghost (Note: Yuyuko is referred in the character profiles as bōrei whereas Youmu is referred to as yūrei; ZUN has noted that even native Japanese speakers might confuse these two terms, as they're similar in typical Japanese folklore and admits to not really properly explaining the difference between the two in Touhou canon.) princess of Hakugyokurō. Despite her whimsical, airheaded demeanor and reputation as a glutton, she holds a high-ranking position managing the spirits of the dead for the Yama. Yuyuko reveals she wishes to revive a corpse sealed beneath the "Saigyou Ayakashi" (西行妖), a demonic cherry blossom tree that has never bloomed. To break the seal, she needs the final fragments of spring carried by the heroine. Upon the heroine's victory, the truth is revealed: the body sealed beneath the tree is Yuyuko's own. In her previous life as a human—implied to be the daughter of the real-life poet Saigyō Hōshi—she possessed a "death-manipulating" ability that she came to fear. She committed suicide to seal the tree and her own terrifying power, becoming a ghost who eventually forgot her living past.

=== Extra scenario ===
Sometime later, as the heroines are busy flower viewing with the now-restored spring, Yuyuko asks the heroine for a favor. The boundary between Gensokyo and the Netherworld has been weakened, causing ghosts to leak into the living world. Yuyuko asks the heroine to find her friend, Yukari Yakumo, who is responsible for the barrier's maintenance.

In the Extra Stage, "Shikigami of the Shikigami of the Youkai," the heroine returns to the Netherworld and is confronted by a powered-up Chen, and subsequently her master, Ran Yakumo (八雲 藍). Ran is a nine-tailed fox kitsune and the shikigami of Yukari Yakumo. Highly intelligent, Ran possesses a mind comparable to a supercomputer, capable of calculating the width of the Sanzu River or complex equations instantly. Because her master sleeps twelve hours a day, Ran handles much of the day-to-day maintenance of Gensokyo's barriers. She attacks the heroine to avenge Chen's earlier defeat but is ultimately subdued.

Ran suggests the heroine return at night when her master is awake. In the Phantasm Stage, "Border of Humans and Youkai," the heroine meets Yukari Yakumo (八雲 紫). Yukari is the "Phantasm Youkai" who manipulates boundaries—a power that allows her to control the borders between truth and falsehood, reality and dream, and physical locations. She is one of the Sages of Gensokyo and was instrumental in the creation of the Great Hakurei Barrier that isolates Gensokyo from the outside world. Impressed by the heroine's skill, Yukari battles her before agreeing to repair the boundary.

== Development ==
The first demo of Perfect Cherry Blossom was released at the 63rd Comiket on December 30, 2002. Another demo with only the MIDI soundtrack was released freely online on January 26, 2003. The full game was released on August 17, 2003, in the 64th Comiket, while distribution in doujin shops started on September 7 of that year. ZUN, the only member of Team Shanghai Alice, made another version of the game for the first Reitaisai, held on April 18, 2004, where a score attack tournament was held. This version features changed dialogue and background music for the Phantasm stage. The new track is included in the doujin CD Cradle -tōhō gegakushi den- (Cradle -東方幻樂祀典-) by Sound Sepher.

Due to many fans asking him about the names of the nameless mid-bosses in Embodiment of Scarlet Devil, ZUN decided to have a name and character profile in-mind while designing the Stage 4 midboss character Lily White. ZUN also has noted that designing the boss patterns for the Prismriver Sisters was difficult, due to various bugs.

ZUN stated that Perfect Cherry Blossom is "not a very smart game", saying that since many new people are playing his games, it would be nice to have more fan service, but it is just more of the same. He says that this is on purpose, since doujin games give him the freedom to create what he likes as opposed to game companies where the main goal is to attract new customers.

== Reception and legacy ==
In a review for Sick Critic, Max Broggi-Sumner said that "Perfect Cherry Blossom is a fantastic sequel, taking everything that made EoSD great and improving on it. With more playable characters, more welcoming mechanics, a second extra stage, a debatably better soundtrack, and just as entrancing bullet patterns, PCB is fantastic for both newcomers to the series who just want to beat the game on normal, as well as veterans who’re good enough to focus on getting a high score on Lunatic difficulty." On GameSpot, Perfect Cherry Blossom had an average user rating of 9.4/10.

According to ZUN, Perfect Cherry Blossom was the most popular Touhou Project game in the series. Sometime after its release, he has noticed an increasing number of derivative works that, to his surprise, covered various genres.Game Rant ranked it as the 5th best Touhou Project game, praising it for being among the most accessible titles in the series. British comedian and journalist Charlie Brooker, in his video game review show Gameswipe, presented Perfect Cherry Blossom as an example of the shoot 'em up genre that "masochistic maniacs actively enjoy dipping into". He said the game "sort of resembles a firework display being sick".

=== Character popularity and derivative works ===
The characters introduced in Perfect Cherry Blossom have maintained significant popularity decades after the game's release, appearing frequently in polls and fan-created media.

In an August 2025 survey conducted by the Japanese media site 'Anime! Anime!' for "National Ghost Day," Yuyuko Saigyouji ranked 3rd in the "Favorite Ghost Character" category, trailing only the protagonists of Toilet-Bound Hanako-kun and GeGeGe no Kitaro. She held this position for two consecutive years, with fans citing the gap between her "fluffy" demeanor and her terrifying strength as a key appeal. Youmu Konpaku also appeared on the same list, ranking 15th.

Alice Margatroid continues to be a popular subject for doujin games. In April 2007, a vocal arrangement by IOSYS of the game's "Doll Judgement ~ The Girl Who Played with People’s Shapes", called "Marisa Stole The Precious Thing" and featuring the character, became popular on the Japanese video sharing website Niconico. In May 2024, the circle Desunoya released SUPER ALICE DOLLS on Steam, a 2D side-scrolling action game where Alice uses her dolls to shield herself, attack enemies, and traverse gaps. The game highlights her "Seven-Colored Puppeteer" ability originally showcased in Perfect Cherry Blossom, adapting the bullet hell mechanics into a platforming format.

=== Cross-media appearances ===
The game introduced several characters who became central figures in the wider Touhou Project franchise. Yukari Yakumo was established as one of the Sages of Gensokyo and a key figure in the creation of the Great Hakurei Barrier; ZUN has noted that introducing Yukari was an important step in Touhou's worldbuilding, as she allowed him to start making distinction between what's part of Gensokyo, and what isn't, as well creating a character that could speak from a meta-perspective. Lore books and manga such as Silent Sinner in Blue expanded on her backstory, revealing she had organized an invasion of the Moon over a millennium prior to the game's events.

Alice Margatroid, a returning character from the PC-98 era, was reintroduced in this game specifically to serve as a partner for Marisa Kirisame in the sequel, Imperishable Night, as ZUN felt it would be unnatural to pair Marisa with a brand new character, though ZUN has also noted that due to trying to avoid introduction any elements pointing towards the final boss in the game's trial version, her appearance towards the end of it was meant to serve as a red herring for any players speculating on this topic.

Yuyuko Saigyouji's backstory is heavily implied to be connected to the real-life poet Saigyō Hōshi; the game's lore states she was the daughter of a "poet famous for cherry blossoms" who died beneath the Saigyou Ayakashi. She later appeared as a guest character in the Square Enix arcade game Lord of Vermilion Re:2. Youmu Konpaku also became a recurring playable protagonist in later titles such as Ten Desires and Wily Beast and Weakest Creature. Her distinct nature as a half-human, half-phantom hybrid—where she is physically human but accompanied by a large "phantom" sac—has been a subject of various game mechanics and lore explanations.

The game's music has been featured in other titles; an arrangement of Yukari Yakumo's theme "Necrofantasia" appears in the Taito arcade games Music GunGun! 2 and Groove Coaster. Several tracks from the game were also included in the mobile rhythm game Touhou Danmaku Kagura.
