= Hiroyuki Goto =

Japanese video game designer

Hiroyuki Gotō (後藤 裕之, Gotō Hiroyuki) recited pi from memory to 42,195 decimal places at NHK Broadcasting Centre, Tokyo on 18 February 1995. This set the world record at the time, which was held for more than a decade until Lu Chao beat it in 2005.

Goto was born in Tokyo, Japan. He is a game designer at Namco. He is the creator of word puzzle video game Kotoba no Puzzle Moji Pittan, which was released as an arcade game in 2001 and later become available for various console and portable gaming systems.
