= List of Haruhi Suzumiya character song singles =

The following music singles are from the anime series The Melancholy of Haruhi Suzumiya sung by the voice actors for the three main female and two main male characters in the series along with four other supporting female characters, making the total number of character albums nine in all. The first three released included songs by Aya Hirano as Haruhi Suzumiya, Minori Chihara as Yuki Nagato and Yuko Goto as Mikuru Asahina. Moreover, two additional character CDs were released on December 6, 2006, sung by Yuki Matsuoka as Tsuruya and Natsuko Kuwatani as Ryōko Asakura. Two more character CDs were released on January 24, 2007, sung by Sayaka Aoki as Kyon's Sister and Yuri Shiratori as Emiri Kimidori. Finally, the CDs for Itsuki Koizumi and Kyon were released on February 21, 2007.

Each of the nine singles feature the ending theme song "Hare Hare Yukai". Other than the three main female character's versions which are solo cover versions of the original, there are some alterations. For Tsuruya's version as well as Ryōko's version, the lyrics were changed to fit the character; Tsuruya's version contains her catch phrase "nyoro", while Ryōko reverses the optimistic lyrics to convey futility and destruction. However, while Tsuruya's and Ryōko's versions have the same arrangements as the original version, the last four released have their arrangements changed along with the lyrics. Kyon's Sister's version is very upbeat; Emiri's version is very fact-based; Itsuki's version talks about his ESP; and Kyon reflects about his now-disturbed life in his version.

== First set ==
=== Haruhi Suzumiya ===
Melancholy of Haruhi Suzumiya Character Song Vol. 1 Haruhi Suzumiya

Soundtrack album by Haruhi Suzumiya (Aya Hirano)
- Released: July 5, 2006
- Genre: Anime soundtrack
- Length: 23:24
- Label: Lantis

Haruhi Suzumiya (Aya Hirano) chronology
Suzumiya Haruhi no Tsumeawase	Melancholy of Haruhi Suzumiya Character Song Vol. 1 Haruhi Suzumiya	Ashita no Prism

Melancholy of Haruhi Suzumiya Character Song Vol. 1 Haruhi Suzumiya (涼宮ハルヒの憂鬱 キャラクターソング Vol. 1 涼宮ハルヒ, Suzumiya Haruhi no Yūutsu Kyarakutā Songu Vol. 1 Suzumiya Haruhi) is the first volume of the character song albums and was released on July 5, 2006. The special edition of the third volume DVD of the anime series in North America bundled this CD in the package, released on September 25, 2007.

- Oricon Weekly Rank Peak: #11
- Weeks in Chart: 10 weeks

==== Track listing ====
1. "Parallel Days" (パラレル Days) – 4:19
2. "SOS Nara Daijōbu" (SOS ならだいじょーぶ, The SOS Will Be Alright) – 3:46
3. "Hare Hare Yukai (Haruhi solo)" (ハレ晴レユカイ) – 3:37
4. "Parallel Days (off vocal)" (パラレル Days (off vocal)) – 4:19
5. "SOS Nara Daijōbu (off vocal)" (SOS ならだいじょーぶ (off vocal)) – 3:46
6. "Hare Hare Yukai (Haruhi solo) (off vocal)" (ハレ晴レユカイ (off vocal)) – 3:37

=== Yuki Nagato ===
Melancholy of Haruhi Suzumiya Character Song Vol. 2 Yuki Nagato

Soundtrack album by Yuki Nagato (Minori Chihara)
- Released: July 5, 2006
- Genre: Anime soundtrack
- Length: 24:56
- Label: Lantis

Melancholy of Haruhi Suzumiya Character Song Vol. 2 Yuki Nagato (涼宮ハルヒの憂鬱 キャラクターソング Vol. 2 長門 有希, Suzumiya Haruhi no Yūutsu Kyarakutā Songu Vol. 2 Nagato Yuki) is the second volume of the character song albums and was released on July 5, 2006.

- Oricon Weekly Rank Peak: #13
- Weeks in Chart: 16 weeks (Longest charting single of the series)

==== Track listing ====
1. "Yuki, Muon, Madobe Nite." (雪、無音、窓辺にて。, Snow, Silence, By the Window.) – 4:30
2. "SELECT?" – 4:21
3. "Hare Hare Yukai (Yuki solo)" (ハレ晴レユカイ) – 3:37
4. "Yuki, Muon, Madobe Nite. (off vocal)" (雪、無音、窓辺にて。 (off vocal)) – 4:30
5. "SELECT? (off vocal)" – 4:21
6. "Hare Hare Yukai (Yuki solo) (off vocal)" (ハレ晴レユカイ (off vocal)) – 3:37

=== Mikuru Asahina ===
Melancholy of Haruhi Suzumiya Character Song Vol. 3 Mikuru Asahina

Soundtrack album by Mikuru Ashahina (Yūko Gotō)
- Released: July 5, 2006
- Genre: Anime soundtrack
- Length: 23:52
- Label: Lantis

Melancholy of Haruhi Suzumiya Character Song Vol. 3 Mikuru Asahina (涼宮ハルヒの憂鬱 キャラクターソング Vol. 3 朝比奈 みくる, Suzumiya Haruhi no Yūutsu Kyarakutā Songu Vol. 3 Asahina Mikuru) is the third volume of the character song albums and was released on July 5, 2006.

- Oricon Weekly Rank Peak: #14
- Weeks in Chart: 8 weeks

==== Track listing ====
1. "Mitsukete Happy Life" (見つけて Happy Life) – 3:57
2. "Toki no Puzzle" (時のパズル) – 4:22
3. "Hare Hare Yukai (Mikuru solo)" (ハレ晴レユカイ) – 3:37
4. "Mitsukete Happy Life (off vocal)" (見つけて Happy Life (off vocal)) – 3:57
5. "Toki no Puzzle (off vocal)" (時のパズル (off vocal)) – 4:22
6. "Hare Hare Yukai (Mikuru solo) (off vocal)" (ハレ晴レユカイ (off vocal)) – 3:37

=== Tsuruya-san ===
The Melancholy of Haruhi Suzumiya Character Song Vol. 4 Tsuruya-san

Soundtrack album by Tsuruya-san (Yuki Matsuoka)
- Released: December 6, 2006
- Genre: Anime soundtrack
- Length: 22:23
- Label: Lantis

The Melancholy of Haruhi Suzumiya Character Song Vol. 4 Tsuruya-san (涼宮ハルヒの憂鬱 キャラクターソング Vol. 4 鶴屋さん, Suzumiya Haruhi no Yūutsu Kyarakutā Songu Vol. 4 Tsuruya-san) is the fourth volume of the character song albums and was released on December 6, 2006.

- Oricon Weekly Rank Peak: #13
- Weeks in Chart: 9 weeks

==== Track listing ====
1. "Seishun Ii ja nai ka" (青春いいじゃないかっ) – 4:09
2. "Megassa Kōkishin" (めがっさ好奇心) – 5:14
3. "Hare Hare Yukai" ~Ver. Tsuruya-san~ (ハレ晴レユカイ～Ver.鶴屋さん～) – 3:37
4. "Seishun Ii ja nai ka" (off vocal) (青春いいじゃないかっ（off vocal）) – 4:09
5. "Megassa Kōkishin" (off vocal) (めがっさ好奇心（off vocal）) – 5:14

=== Ryōko Asakura ===
The Melancholy of Haruhi Suzumiya Character Song Vol. 5 Ryōko Asakura

Soundtrack album by Ryōko Asakura (Natsuko Kuwatani)
- Released: December 6, 2006
- Genre: Anime soundtrack
- Length: 20:31
- Label: Lantis

The Melancholy of Haruhi Suzumiya Character Song Vol. 5 Ryōko Asakura (涼宮ハルヒの憂鬱 キャラクターソング Vol. 5 朝倉涼子, Suzumiya Haruhi no Yūutsu Kyarakutā Songu Vol. 5 Asakura Ryōko) is the fifth volume of the character song albums and was released on December 6, 2006.

- Oricon Weekly Rank Peak: #16
- Weeks in Chart: 9 weeks

==== Track listing ====
1. "Koyubi de Gyu!" (小指でぎゅっ！) – 4:39
2. "COOL EDITION" – 3:48
3. "Hare Hare Yukai" ~Ver. Asakura Ryōko~ (ハレ晴レユカイ～Ver.朝倉涼子～) – 3:37
4. "Koyubi de Gyu!" (off vocal) (小指でぎゅっ！(off vocal)) – 4:39
5. "COOL EDITION" (off vocal) – 3:48

=== Kyon's Sister ===
The Melancholy of Haruhi Suzumiya Character Song Vol. 6 Kyon's Sister

Soundtrack album by Kyon's Sister (Sayaka Aoki)
- Released: January 24, 2007
- Genre: Anime soundtrack
- Length: 14:38
- Label: Lantis

The Melancholy of Haruhi Suzumiya Character Song Vol. 6 Kyon's Sister (涼宮ハルヒの憂鬱 キャラクターソング Vol. 6 キョンの妹, Suzumiya Haruhi no Yūutsu Kyarakutā Songu Vol. 6 Kyon no Imōto) is the sixth volume of the character song albums and was released on January 24, 2007. This single is the second highest charting of all the Haruhi Character singles, however, also was the second shortest in charting weeks.

- Oricon Weekly Rank Peak: #10
- Weeks in Chart: 6 weeks

==== Track listing ====
1. "Imōto Wasurecha Oshioki Yo" (妹わすれちゃおしおきよ) – 3:37
2. "Hare Hare Yukai" ~Ver. Kyon's Sister~ (ハレ晴レユカイ～Ver.キョンの妹～) – 3:42
3. "Imōto Wasurecha Oshioki Yo" (off vocal) (妹わすれちゃおしおきよ(off vocal)) – 3:37
4. "Hare Hare Yukai" ~Ver. Kyon's Sister~ (off vocal) (ハレ晴レユカイ～Ver.キョンの妹～（off vocal）) – 3:42

=== Emiri Kimidori ===
The Melancholy of Haruhi Suzumiya Character Song Vol. 7 Emiri Kimidori

Soundtrack album by Emiri Kimidori (Yuri Shiratori)
- Released: January 24, 2007
- Genre: Anime soundtrack
- Length: 19:48
- Label: Lantis

The Melancholy of Haruhi Suzumiya Character Song Vol. 7 Emiri Kimidori (涼宮ハルヒの憂鬱 キャラクターソング Vol. 7 喜緑 江美里, Suzumiya Haruhi no Yūutsu Kyarakutā Songu Vol. 7 Kimidori Emiri) is the seventh volume of the character song albums and was released on January 24, 2007.

- Oricon Weekly Rank Peak: #11
- Weeks in Chart: 5 weeks (Shortest charting single out of the whole series)

==== Track listing ====
1. "Fixed Mind" – 5:04
2. "Hare Hare Yukai" ~Ver. Emiri Kimidori~ (ハレ晴レユカイ～Ver.喜緑江美里～) – 4:50
3. "Fixed Mind" (off vocal) – 5:04
4. "Hare Hare Yukai" ~Ver. Emiri Kimidori~ (off vocal) (ハレ晴レユカイ～Ver.喜緑江美里～ (off vocal)) – 4:50

=== Itsuki Koizumi ===
Melancholy of Haruhi Suzumiya Character Song Vol. 8 Itsuki Koizumi

Soundtrack album by Itsuki Koizumi (Daisuke Ono)
- Released: February 21, 2007
- Genre: Anime soundtrack
- Length: 17:58
- Label: Lantis

Melancholy of Haruhi Suzumiya Character Song Vol. 8 Itsuki Koizumi (涼宮ハルヒの憂鬱 キャラクターソング Vol.8 古泉一樹, Suzumiya Haruhi no Yūutsu Kyarakutā Songu Vol. 8 Koizumi Itsuki) is the eighth volume of the character song albums and was released on February 21, 2007.

- Oricon Weekly Rank Peak: #11
- Weeks in Chart: 10 weeks

==== Track listing ====
1. "Maggāre ↓ Spectacle" (まっがーれ↓スペクタクル, Maggāre↓Supekutakuru) – 3:51
2. "Hare Hare Yukai" ~Ver. Itsuki Koizumi~ (ハレ晴レユカイ～Ver.古泉一樹～) – 5:08
3. "Maggāre ↓ Spectacle" (off vocal) (まっがーれ↓スペクタクル (off vocal), Maggāre↓Supekutakuru) – 3:51
4. "Hare Hare Yukai" ~Ver. Itsuki Koizumi~ (off vocal) (ハレ晴レユカイ～Ver.古泉一樹～ (off vocal)) – 5:08

=== Kyon ===
Melancholy of Haruhi Suzumiya Character Song Vol. 9 Kyon

Soundtrack album by Kyon (Tomokazu Sugita)
- Released: February 21, 2007
- Genre: Anime soundtrack
- Length: 17:32
- Label: Lantis

Melancholy of Haruhi Suzumiya Character Song Vol. 9 Kyon (涼宮ハルヒの憂鬱 キャラクターソング Vol.9 キョン, Suzumiya Haruhi no Yūutsu Kyarakutā Songu Vol. 9 Kyon) is the ninth volume of the character song albums and was released on February 21, 2007. Kyon's single was the highest charting of all the series, and the second longest charting.

- Oricon Weekly Rank Peak: #9
- Weeks in Chart: 12 weeks

==== Track listing ====
1. "Kentai Life Returns!" (倦怠ライフ・リターンズ!, Kentai Raifu Ritānzu!) – 3:36
2. "Hare Hare Yukai" ~Ver. Kyon~ (ハレ晴レユカイ～Ver.キョン～) – 5:10
3. "Kentai Life Returns!" (off vocal) (倦怠ライフ・リターンズ! (off vocal), Kentai Raifu Ritānzu!) – 3:36
4. "Hare Hare Yukai" ~Ver. Kyon~ (off vocal) (ハレ晴レユカイ～Ver.キョン～ (off vocal)) – 5:10

== Second set ==
=== Haruhi Suzumiya ===
Melancholy of Haruhi Suzumiya Character Song Vol. 1 Haruhi Suzumiya

Soundtrack album by Haruhi Suzumiya (Aya Hirano)
- Released: October 1, 2009
- Genre: Anime soundtrack
- Length: 14:34
- Label: Lantis

Melancholy of Haruhi Suzumiya Character Song Vol. 1 Haruhi Suzumiya (涼宮ハルヒの憂鬱 キャラクターソング Vol. 1 涼宮ハルヒ, Suzumiya Haruhi no Yūutsu Kyarakutā Songu Vol. 1 Suzumiya Haruhi) is the first volume of the character song albums and was released on October 1, 2009.

==== Track listing ====
1. "Punkish Regular" – 3:24
2. "Sono Hi Sora wa Kitto Aoi" (その日空はきっと青い) – 4:03
3. "Punkish Regular (off vocal)" – 3:24
4. "Sono Hi Sora wa Kitto Aoi (off vocal)" (その日空はきっと青い) – 3:46

=== Yuki Nagato ===
Melancholy of Haruhi Suzumiya Character Song Vol. 2 Yuki Nagato

Soundtrack album by Yuki Nagato (Minori Chihara)
- Released: October 1, 2009
- Genre: Anime soundtrack
- Label: Lantis

Melancholy of Haruhi Suzumiya Character Song Vol. 2 Yuki Nagato (涼宮ハルヒの憂鬱 キャラクターソング Vol. 2 長門 有希, Suzumiya Haruhi no Yūutsu Kyarakutā Songu Vol. 2 Nagato Yuki) is the second volume of the character song albums and was released on October 1, 2009.

==== Track listing ====
1. "under 'Mebius'" – 5:11
2. "Tsūka Chiten no Musica" (通過地点のMUSICA) – 3:51
3. "under 'Mebius' (off vocal)" – 5:11
4. "Tsūka Chiten no Musica (off vocal)" (通過地点のMUSICA) – 3:51

=== Mikuru Asahina ===
Melancholy of Haruhi Suzumiya Character Song Vol. 3 Mikuru Asahina

Soundtrack album by Mikuru Asahina (Yūko Gotō)
- Released: October 1, 2009
- Genre: Anime soundtrack
- Label: Lantis

Melancholy of Haruhi Suzumiya Character Song Vol. 3 Mikuru Asahina (涼宮ハルヒの憂鬱 キャラクターソング Vol. 3 朝比奈 みくる, Suzumiya Haruhi no Yūutsu Kyarakutā Songu Vol. 3 Asahina Mikuru) is the third volume of the character song albums and was released on October 1, 2009.

==== Track listing ====
1. "Etto...Returns Shite Revenge!" (えっと…リターンズしてリベンジ！) – 3:53
2. "Hen desu, Kowai desu" (ヘンですコワイです) – 3:48
3. "Etto...Returns Shite Revenge! (off vocal)" (えっと…リターンズしてリベンジ！(off vocal)) – 3:53
4. "Hen desu, Kowai desu (off vocal)" (ヘンですコワイです(off vocal)) – 3:48

=== Itsuki Koizumi ===
Melancholy of Haruhi Suzumiya Character Song Vol. 4 Itsuki Koizumi

Soundtrack album by Itsuki Koizumi (Daisuke Ono)
- Released: November 18, 2009
- Genre: Anime soundtrack
- Label: Lantis

Melancholy of Haruhi Suzumiya Character Song Vol. 4 Itsuki Koizumi (涼宮ハルヒの憂鬱 キャラクターソング Vol. 4 古泉一樹, Suzumiya Haruhi no Yūutsu Kyarakutā Songu Vol. 4 Koizumi Itsuki) is the fourth volume of the character song albums and was released on November 18, 2009.

==== Track list ====
1. "'Tsumaranai Hanashi desu yo' to Boku wa Iu" (「つまらない話ですよ」と僕は言う) – 4:25
2. "Tada no Himitsu" (ただの秘密) – 4:40
3. "'Tsumaranai Hanashi desu yo' to Boku wa Iu (off vocal)" (「つまらない話ですよ」と僕は言う(off vocal)) – 4:25
4. "Tada no Himitsu (off vocal)" (ただの秘密(off vocal)) – 4:40

=== Kyon ===
Melancholy of Haruhi Suzumiya Character Song Vol. 5 Kyon

Soundtrack album by Kyon (Tomokazu Sugita)
- Released: December 9, 2009
- Genre: Anime soundtrack
- Label: Lantis

Melancholy of Haruhi Suzumiya Character Song Vol. 5 Kyon (涼宮ハルヒの憂鬱 キャラクターソング Vol. 5 キョン, Suzumiya Haruhi no Yūutsu Kyarakutā Songu Vol. 5 Kyon) is the fifth volume of the character song albums and was released on December 9, 2009.

==== Track list ====
1. "Homo Sapiens Rhapsody" (ホモ・サピエンス・ラプソディ) – 4:21
2. "Daga Soredake Janai" (だがそれだけじゃない) – 3:48
3. "Homo Sapiens Rhapsody (off vocal)" (ホモ・サピエンス・ラプソディ(off vocal)) – 4:21
4. "Daga Soredake Janai (off vocal)" (だがそれだけじゃない(off vocal)) – 3:48

=== Tsuruya-san ===
Melancholy of Haruhi Suzumiya Character Song Vol. 6 Tsuruya-san

Soundtrack album by Tsuruya-san (Yuki Matsuoka)
- Released: December 9, 2009
- Genre: Anime soundtrack
- Label: Lantis

Melancholy of Haruhi Suzumiya Character Song Vol. 6 Tsuruya-san (涼宮ハルヒの憂鬱 キャラクターソング Vol. 6 鶴屋さん, Suzumiya Haruhi no Yūutsu Kyarakutā Songu Vol. 6 Tsuruya-san) is the sixth volume of the character song albums and was released on December 9, 2009.

==== Track list ====
1. "Matte Matte! Irasshai" (祭って祭って! いらっしゃ～い) – 3:16
2. "Osawagase no the End" (お騒がせのジ・エンド) – 3:38
3. "Matte Matte! Irasshai (off vocal)" (祭って祭って! いらっしゃ～い(off vocal)) – 3:16
4. "Osawagase no the End (off vocal)" (お騒がせのジ・エンド(off vocal)) – 3:38

=== Taniguchi ===
Melancholy of Haruhi Suzumiya Character Song Vol. 7 Taniguchi

Soundtrack album by Taniguchi (Minoru Shiraishi)
- Released: December 9, 2009
- Genre: Anime soundtrack
- Label: Lantis

Melancholy of Haruhi Suzumiya Character Song Vol. 7 Taniguchi (涼宮ハルヒの憂鬱 キャラクターソング Vol. 7 谷口, Suzumiya Haruhi no Yūutsu Kyarakutā Songu Vol. 7 Taniguchi) is the seventh volume of the character song albums and was released on December 9, 2009.

==== Track list ====
1. "Jinsei no Shuyaku Call！" (人生の主役コール！) – 3:30
2. "Tomodachi Toshite wa Sorega" (友達としてはソレが) – 3:47
3. "Jinsei no Shuyaku Call！ (off vocal)" (人生の主役コール！(off vocal)) – 3:30
4. "Tomodachi Toshite wa Sorega (off vocal)" (友達としてはソレが(off vocal)) – 3:47
