= Kotoba no Puzzle: Mojipittan =

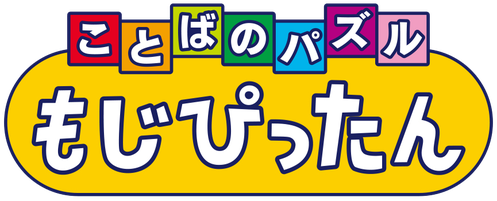
- Genre: Puzzle
- Developers: Namco; Namco Bandai Games
- Publishers: Namco; Namco Bandai Games
- Creator: Hiroyuki Goto
- Platforms: Arcade, Game Boy Advance, PlayStation 2, PlayStation Portable, Wii, Nintendo DS, Feature phones, iOS, Android, PlayStation 4, Microsoft Windows, Nintendo Switch
- First release: Kotoba no Puzzle: Mojipittan; December 2001

Kotoba no Puzzle: Mojipittan (Note: Japanese: ことばのパズル もじぴったん, Hepburn: lit. Word Puzzle: Mojipittan) is a series of Japanese word puzzle video games developed and published by Bandai Namco Entertainment, formerly Namco. The series began in arcades with Kotoba no Puzzle: Mojipittan in 2001, and has seen multiple sequels for several platforms, including the Game Boy Advance, PlayStation Portable and Nintendo DS. Gameplay is similar to Scrabble — players are tasked with using Hiragana to form words on a board by placing down pieces marked with Hiragana characters.

The original Kotoba no Puzzle was designed by Hiroyuki Goto, who is well known in Japan for being able to recite pi from memory to 42,195 decimal places, making him the world record holder at the time. Likely due to its strong usage of Japanese, the series has remained confined to Japan. The Kotoba no Puzzle series was met with positive reviews from critics, being praised for its originality, multiplayer and addictive gameplay, with Kotoba no Puzzle: Mojipittan DS receiving the "Gold Hall of Fame" award from Famitsu.

== Gameplay ==
Mojipittan is similar in play to the word game Scrabble. The player uses tiles with hiragana to build words. The player may take turns against the computer or a human opponent or play alone. Unlike Scrabble, however, each player may place only one tile per turn as opposed to multiple tiles in the former. Tiles must be placed next to any other tile on the board, space permitting, but at least one word must be formed with each tile placed; as long as these conditions are met, a tile may be placed anywhere on the board, even if not all of the other tiles a new tile is connected to form new words.

A major difference in how the game plays in contrast with Scrabble is that words do not need to be isolated.

		つ	
ふ	つ	う	ち
		か	

For example, in the play pictured above, with the bold letter う (u) being played, in addition to つうか (tsuuka, either 通過, meaning "passing", or 通貨, meaning "currency"), つう (通 or tsuu, meaning "connoisseur") and うか (羽化 or uka, meaning "eclosion") qualify as words. The horizontal words that qualify in this play are ふつう (普通 or futsuu, meaning "normal"), つうち (通知 or tsuuchi, meaning "notification"), and うち (内 or uchi, meaning "inside"), as well as つう again. Forming multiple words with the placement of a single tile is termed a "chain".

Stages have objectives such as "fill all the spots on the board", "create twenty words over three tiles long", or "create chains of three, eight times". The board always has pre-existing tiles that players have to work with.

== Games in series ==
- Kotoba no Puzzle: Mojipittan (ことばのパズル もじぴったん) (2001, Arcade)
- Kotoba no Puzzle: Mojipittan (ことばのパズル もじぴったん) (2003, PlayStation 2)
- Kotoba no Puzzle: Mojipittan Advance (ことばのパズル もじぴったん アドバンス) (2003, Game Boy Advance, Wii U Virtual Console)
- Kotoba no Puzzle: Mojipittan Daijiten (ことばのパズル もじぴったん大辞典, Word Puzzle: Mojipittan Encyclopedia) (2004. PlayStation Portable)
- Kotoba no Puzzle: Mojipittan DS (ことばのパズル もじぴったんDS) (2007, Nintendo DS)
- Kotoba no Puzzle: Mojipittan Wii (ことばのパズル もじぴったんWii) (2008, Wii)
- Nagameru Dake de Kashikoku Nareru! Mojipittan Shiritori Tokei (眺めるだけで賢くなれる!もじぴったんしりとり時計, Become Smarter Just By Watching! Mojipittan Shiritori Clock) (2009, Nintendo DSi)
- Kotoba no Puzzle: Mojipittan (ことばのパズル もじぴったん) (2010, iOS, Android)
- Kotoba no Puzzle: Mojipittan Encore (ことばのパズル もじぴったんアンコール) (2020, Nintendo Switch, PlayStation 4, Android, iOS, Steam)

=== Spin-off games ===
- Mojiris (もじリス) (2005, i-appli)
- Mojiris Hekisa (もじリスヘキサ) (2007, i-appli)
- Puzzle de Tanoshiku Eigo ga Manaberu! Mojipittan for ENGLISH (パズルで楽しく英語が学べる! もじぴったん for ENGLISH, Have Fun Learning English With Puzzles! Mojipittan for ENGLISH) (2019, iOS)

== Board game ==
A board game adaptation called Kotoba no Card Game: Mojipittan (ことばのカードゲーム もじぴったん, lit. Words' Card Game: Mojipittan) was made by Mega House under Bandai Namco's license and released in 2007.

== Reception ==
On release, Famitsu scored Mojipittan DS a 33 out of 40 (9/8/8/8).
