= Matrimelee =

2003 video game

- North American Arcade flyer
- Developer: Noise Factory
- Publisher: Atlus; Playmore; MEGA; Sun Amusement: Excite Japan (PS2)
- Director: Keiko Iju
- Producer: Keiko Iju
- Designer: Orie Kinugasa
- Programmers: Hidenari Mamoto; Hiroshi Hishikawa; Kazuaki Ezato
- Artists: Bunshichirō Ōma; Range Murata; Tomokazu Nakano
- Composer: Toshikazu Tanaka
- Series: Power Instinct
- Platforms: Arcade, Neo Geo AES, PlayStation 2
- Release: Arcade: WW: 20 March 2003; Neo Geo AES: WW: 29 May 2003; PlayStation 2: JP: 25 May 2006
- Genre: Fighting
- Modes: Single-player, multiplayer
- Arcade system: Neo Geo MVS

Matrimelee (Note: Known in Japan as Shin Gouketsuji Ichizoku: Toukon -Matrimelee- (新豪血寺一族 闘婚 -Matrimelee-)) is an arcade fighting game published by Playmore. It is the fifth installment in the Power Instinct series, and the second fighting game developed by Noise Factory after Rage of the Dragons. The game was first released on Neo Geo arcade system on March 20, 2003, and was one of the last games to be released on the system. The title is a portmanteau of "matrimony" and "melee".

Matrimelee ignores gameplay elements introduced in its predecessor, Groove on Fight, and goes back to 1-on-1 match structure. A few of the elements from Rage of the Dragons were integrated to this game, such as the special meter that slowly fills up when an attack connects with an opponent and the four guest stars.

In 2006, the game was released on PlayStation 2 exclusively in Japan, under the new title Shin Gōketsuji Ichizoku: Bonnō Kaihō (新・豪血寺一族 煩悩解放). This port treats itself a sequel, taking place after the events from Matrimelee, with more changes in gameplay and the addition of new characters while removing the Rage of the Dragons cast.

== Gameplay ==
Gameplay screenshot showcasing a match between Clara Hananokouji and Oume Goketsuji.

Matrimelee discards all the characters introduced in Groove on Fight and brings back the roster from Power Instinct 2 (except Angela, Oshima, Sahad and Kinta, the latter of whom was replaced by his alter-ego of kinta, Poochi), plus four new characters and one new boss (Princess Sissy). It features four unlockable guest characters from Rage of the Dragons: Jimmy, Elias, Lynn, and Mr. Jones. In the game's story, the King of Certain Country wants to find a worthy successor for the throne and the ideal husband for his little daughter (or a beautiful and strong woman for his older son). He decides to hold a fighting tournament where the prize is the hand of the princess and the throne succession.

The game inherits the Stress meter system from Power Instinct 2, but with further changes. The Stress meter can now be filled up to three levels. Super moves included are a Stress Shot (one bar), an Ippatsu Ougi (two bars) and a powerful, hidden super attack called a Kinjite (three bars). However, only a few of the characters have Kinjite moves. Transformations are also no longer possible.

== Release ==
Matrimelee was first released for arcades on March 20, 2003. The home console version for the Neo Geo AES was released on May 29, 2003.

The game was ported to PlayStation 2 on May 25, 2006, under the title Shin Gōketsuji Ichizoku: Bonnō Kaihō (新・豪血寺一族 煩悩解放). It was released exclusively in Japan. It includes enhanced graphics and sound, the return of two older characters, Angela Belti, and Kinta Kokuin, a new boss (Bobby Strong, a comedic re-interpretation of Nigerian-Japanese personality Bobby Ologun, who provided his voice for the game), and the transformation feature. Gameplay was also improved in some areas, and super attacks were made easier to execute. The game has the same backgrounds and all the characters from Matrimelee (except the four secret characters from Rage of the Dragons), while the story takes place after the events from the previous game, making it a sort of sequel or update. The game tells the story of the king from the previous game, who holds a "Bonnou Kaihou" ("Liberation of Lusts") tournament to cheer up his daughter Princess Sissy. This time the prize is anything that the winner could wish for (except the throne succession).

This version also features an online mode and a 'Lust Cards System' that consists of buying cards with special effects. Some allow the player to change certain attributes of the characters, while others are used to view special music video clips, and to call strange allies to help in battle.

== Reception ==
Reception

Review score
Publication	Score
HardCore Gamers	(NG) 8/10

== See also ==
- Rage of the Dragons
