= Niwango =

Japanese media corporation

Niwango, Inc. (株式会社 ニワンゴ, Kabushiki Kaisha Niwango) was a Japanese company that was created to manage Niconico. Its headquarters were in the Nico Nico Headquarters Building (ニコニコ本社ビル, Niko Niko Honsha Biru) in Shibuya, Tokyo. It was a subsidiary of Dwango before absorbed into its parent on October 1, 2015.
