= List of K-On! albums =

This is a list of albums from the Japanese anime K-On!.

== Theme songs ==
=== "Cagayake! Girls" ===
"Cagayake! Girls"

Single by Ho-kago Tea Time
- B-side: "Happy!? Sorry!!"
- Released: April 22, 2009
- Recorded: 2009
- Genre: J-pop, rock
- Label: Pony Canyon

"Cagayake! Girls" is a single used as the opening theme for the first season of the anime K-ON!. Sung by Aki Toyosaki as Yui Hirasawa on vocals with Yōko Hikasa as Mio Akiyama, Satomi Satō as Ritsu Tainaka, and Minako Kotobuki as Tsumugi Kotobuki as backup, it was released on April 22, 2009, in Japan by Pony Canyon where it debuted at fourth in the rankings on the Oricon weekly singles chart, selling approximately 62,000 copies.

1. "Cagayake! Girls" – 4:13
2. "Happy!? Sorry!!" – 3:45
3. "Cagayake! Girls" (instrumental) – 4:13
4. "Happy!? Sorry!!" (instrumental) – 3:45

=== "Don't say "lazy"" ===
"Don't say "lazy""

Single by Ho-kago Tea Time
- B-side: "Sweet Bitter Beauty Song"
- Released: April 22, 2009
- Recorded: 2009
- Genre: J-pop, rock
- Label: Pony Canyon

"Don't say "lazy"" is a single used as the ending theme for the first season of the anime K-ON!. Sung by Yōko Hikasa as Mio Akiyama on vocals with Aki Toyosaki as Yui Hirasawa, Satomi Satō as Ritsu Tainaka, and Minako Kotobuki as Tsumugi Kotobuki as backup, it was released on April 22, 2009, in Japan by Pony Canyon where it debuted at second in the rankings on the Oricon weekly singles chart, selling 67,000 copies. It was also awarded the Best Theme Song at the 2009 (14th) Animation Kobe Awards.

1. "Don't say 'lazy'" – 4:27
2. "Sweet Bitter Beauty Song" – 4:21
3. "Don't say 'lazy'" (instrumental) – 4:27
4. "Sweet Bitter Beauty Song" (instrumental) – 4:21

=== "Go! Go! Maniac" ===
"Go! Go! Maniac"

Single by Ho-kago Tea Time
- B-side: "Genius...!?"
- Released: April 28, 2010
- Recorded: 2010
- Genre: J-pop, rock
- Label: Pony Canyon

"Go! Go! Maniac" is a single used as the first opening theme for the second season of the anime K-ON!!. Sung by Aki Toyosaki as Yui Hirasawa on vocals with Yōko Hikasa as Mio Akiyama, Satomi Satō as Ritsu Tainaka, and Minako Kotobuki as Tsumugi Kotobuki, and Ayana Taketatsu as Azusa Nakano as backup, it was released on April 28, 2010, in Japan by Pony Canyon where it debuted at first in the rankings on the Oricon weekly singles chart, selling approximately 83,000 copies. "Go! Go! Maniac" became the first anime image song to ever top the singles chart and the band also became the first female vocalists to occupy the top two spots with "Listen!!" on the singles chart in 26 years since Seiko Matsuda in 1983. It also topped the Billboard Japan Hot 100.

1. "Go! Go! Maniac" – 4:11
2. "Genius...!?" – 4:29
3. "Go! Go! Maniac" (instrumental) – 4:10
4. "Genius...!?" (instrumental) – 4:26

=== "Listen!!" ===
"Listen!!"

Single by Ho-kago Tea Time
- B-side: "Our MAGIC"
- Released: April 28, 2010
- Recorded: 2010
- Genre: J-pop, rock
- Label: Pony Canyon

"Listen!!" is a single used as the first ending theme for the second season of the anime K-ON!!. Sung by Yōko Hikasa as Mio Akiyama on vocals with Aki Toyosaki as Yui Hirasawa, Satomi Satō as Ritsu Tainaka, and Minako Kotobuki as Tsumugi Kotobuki, and Ayana Taketatsu as Azusa Nakano as backup, it was released on April 28, 2010, in Japan by Pony Canyon where it debuted at second in the rankings on the Oricon weekly singles chart, selling approximately 76,000 copies. It also placed second on the Japan Hot 100.

1. "Listen!!" – 3:47
2. "Our Magic" – 4:12
3. "Listen!!" (instrumental) – 3:46
4. "Our Magic" (instrumental) – 4:09

=== "Utauyo!! Miracle" ===
"Utauyo!! Miracle"

Single by Ho-kago Tea Time
- B-side: "Kirakira Days"
- Released: August 4, 2010
- Recorded: 2010
- Genre: J-pop, rock
- Label: Pony Canyon

"Utauyo!! Miracle" is a single used as the second opening theme for the second season of the anime K-ON!!. Sung by Aki Toyosaki as Yui Hirasawa on vocals with Yōko Hikasa as Mio Akiyama, Satomi Satō as Ritsu Tainaka, and Minako Kotobuki as Tsumugi Kotobuki, and Ayana Taketatsu as Azusa Nakano as backup, it was released on August 4, 2010, in Japan by Pony Canyon where it debuted at third in the rankings on the Oricon weekly singles chart, selling approximately 85,000 copies.

1. "Utauyo!! Miracle" – 4:02
2. "Kira Kira Days" (キラキラDays) – 3:40
3. "Utauyo!! Miracle" (instrumental) – 4:01
4. "Kira Kira Days" (instrumental) (キラキラDays) – 3:38

=== "No, Thank You!" ===
"No, Thank You!"

Single by Ho-kago Tea Time
- B-side: "Girls in Wonderland"
- Released: August 4, 2010
- Recorded: 2010
- Genre: J-pop, rock
- Label: Pony Canyon

"No, Thank You!" is a single used as the second ending theme for the second season of the anime K-ON!!. Sung by Yōko Hikasa as Mio Akiyama on vocals with Aki Toyosaki as Yui Hirasawa, Satomi Satō as Ritsu Tainaka, and Minako Kotobuki as Tsumugi Kotobuki, and Ayana Taketatsu as Azusa Nakano as backup, it was released on August 4, 2010, in Japan by Pony Canyon where it debuted at second in the rankings on the Oricon weekly singles chart, selling approximately 87,000 copies, only being beaten by SMAP's single, "This is Love". The song's name comes from all of the first letters of their name, T-ainaka Ritsu, H-irasawa Yui, A-kiyama Mio, N-akano Azusa and K-otobuki Tsumugi.

1. "No, Thank You!" – 4:17
2. "Girls in Wonderland" – 3:34
3. "No, Thank You!" (instrumental) – 4:16
4. "Girls in Wonderland" (instrumental) – 3:31

=== "Unmei♪wa♪Endless!" ===
"Unmei♪wa♪Endless!"

Single by Ho-kago Tea Time
- B-side: "Ichiban Ippai"
- Released: December 7, 2011
- Recorded: 2011
- Genre: J-pop, rock
- Label: Pony Canyon

"Unmei♪wa♪Endless!" is a single used as the opening theme for the K-ON! film. Sung by Aki Toyosaki as Yui Hirasawa on vocals with Yōko Hikasa as Mio Akiyama, Satomi Satō as Ritsu Tainaka, and Minako Kotobuki as Tsumugi Kotobuki, and Ayana Taketatsu as Azusa Nakano as backup, it was released on December 7, 2011, in Japan by Pony Canyon where it debuted at fifth in the rankings on the Oricon weekly singles chart.

1. "Unmei♪wa♪Endless!" – 3:52
2. "Ichiban Ippai" – 4:10
3. "Unmei♪wa♪Endless!" (instrumental) – 3:51
4. "Ichiban Ippai" (instrumental) – 4:06

=== "Singing!" ===
"Singing!"

Single by Ho-kago Tea Time
- B-side: "Ohayou, Mata Ashita"
- Released: December 7, 2011
- Recorded: 2011
- Genre: J-pop, rock
- Label: Pony Canyon

"Singing!" is a single used as the ending theme for the K-ON! film. Sung by Yōko Hikasa as Mio Akiyama on vocals with Aki Toyosaki as Yui Hirasawa, Satomi Satō as Ritsu Tainaka, and Minako Kotobuki as Tsumugi Kotobuki, and Ayana Taketatsu as Azusa Nakano as backup, it was released on December 7, 2011, in Japan by Pony Canyon where it debuted at fourth in the rankings on the Oricon weekly singles chart.

1. "Singing!" – 3:54
2. "Ohayou, Mata Ashita" – 4:55
3. "Singing!" (instrumental) – 3:52
4. "Ohayou, Mata Ashita" (instrumental) – 4:50

== Insert songs ==
=== "Fuwa Fuwa Time" ===
"Fuwa Fuwa Time"

Single by Sakura High Club
- B-side: "Tsubasa o Kudasai"
- Released: May 20, 2009
- Recorded: 2009
- Genre: J-pop, rock
- Label: Pony Canyon

"Fuwa Fuwa Time" (ふわふわ時間(タイム), Fuwa Fuwa Taimu) is performed by Aki Toyosaki as Yui Hirasawa, Yōko Hikasa as Mio Akiyama, Satomi Satō as Ritsu Tainaka, and Minako Kotobuki as Tsumugi Kotobuki.

1. "Fuwa Fuwa Time" (ふわふわ時間(タイム)) – 3:59
2. "Tsubasa o Kudasai" (翼をください) – 3:24
3. "Fuwa Fuwa Time" (instrumental) (ふわふわ時間) – 3:59
4. "Tsubasa o Kudasai" (instrumental) (翼をください) – 3:24
5. "Fuwa Fuwa Time" (instrumental Guitar) (ふわふわ時間) – 4:01
6. "Fuwa Fuwa Time" (instrumental Keyboard) (ふわふわ時間) – 4:01
7. "Fuwa Fuwa Time" (instrumental Bass) (ふわふわ時間) – 4:01
8. "Fuwa Fuwa Time" (instrumental Drums) (ふわふわ時間) – 4:00

=== "Pure Pure Heart" ===
"Pure Pure Heart"

Single by Ho-kago Tea Time
- B-side: "Sakuragaoka Joshi Kōtō Gakkō Kōka (Rock Ver.)"
- Released: June 2, 2010
- Recorded: 2010
- Genre: J-pop, rock
- Label: Pony Canyon

"Pure Pure Heart" (ぴゅあぴゅあはーと, Pyua Pyua Hāto) is performed by Aki Toyosaki as Yui Hirasawa, Yōko Hikasa as Mio Akiyama, Satomi Satō as Ritsu Tainaka, Minako Kotobuki as Tsumugi Kotobuki, and Ayana Taketatsu as Azusa Nakano.

1. "Pure Pure Heart" (ぴゅあぴゅあはーと) – 4:36
2. "Sakuragaoka Joshi Kōtō Gakkō Kōka (Rock Ver.)" (桜が丘女子高等学校校歌 (Rock Ver.)) – 2:57
3. "Pure Pure Heart" (instrumental) (ぴゅあぴゅあはーと) – 4:35
4. "Sakuragaoka Joshi Kōtō Gakkō Kōka (Rock Ver.)" (instrumental) (桜が丘女子高等学校校歌 (Rock Ver.)) – 2:58
5. "Pure Pure Heart" (instrumental Guitar1) (ぴゅあぴゅあはーと) – 4:36
6. "Pure Pure Heart" (instrumental Guitar2) (ぴゅあぴゅあはーと) – 4:36
7. "Pure Pure Heart" (instrumental Keyboard) (ぴゅあぴゅあはーと) – 4:36
8. "Pure Pure Heart" (instrumental Bass) (ぴゅあぴゅあはーと) – 4:37
9. "Pure Pure Heart" (instrumental Drums) (ぴゅあぴゅあはーと) – 4:34

=== "Gohan wa Okazu / U & I" ===
"Gohan wa Okazu / U & I"

Single by Ho-kago Tea Time
- Released: September 8, 2010
- Recorded: 2010
- Genre: J-pop, rock
- Label: Pony Canyon

"Gohan wa Okazu" (ごはんはおかず, lit. Rice is a side dish) / "U & I" is performed by Aki Toyosaki as Yui Hirasawa on vocals with Yōko Hikasa as Mio Akiyama, Satomi Satō as Ritsu Tainaka, Minako Kotobuki as Tsumugi Kotobuki and Ayana Taketatsu as Azusa Nakano.

1. "Gohan wa Okazu" (ごはんはおかず) – 3:12
2. "U & I" – 4:36
3. "Gohan wa Okazu" (instrumental) (ごはんはおかず) – 3:11
4. "U & I" (instrumental) – 4:36
5. "Gohan wa Okazu" (instrumental Guitar1) (ごはんはおかず) – 3:14
6. "Gohan wa Okazu" (instrumental Guitar2) (ごはんはおかず) – 3:14
7. "Gohan wa Okazu" (instrumental Keyboard) (ごはんはおかず) – 3:14
8. "Gohan wa Okazu" (instrumental Bass) (ごはんはおかず) – 3:14
9. "Gohan wa Okazu" (instrumental Drums) (ごはんはおかず) – 3:14
10. "U & I" (instrumental Guitar1) – 4:36
11. "U & I" (instrumental Guitar2) – 4:36
12. "U & I" (instrumental Keyboard) – 4:36
13. "U & I" (instrumental Bass) – 4:36
14. "U & I" (instrumental Drums) – 4:33

== Albums and mini albums ==
=== Ho-kago Tea Time ===
Ho-kago Tea Time

EP by Ho-kago Tea Time
- Released: July 22, 2009
- Recorded: 2009
- Genres: J-pop, rock
- Label: Pony Canyon

Ho-kago Tea Time (放課後ティータイム, Hōkago Tī Taimu) is a mini album by Aki Toyosaki as Yui Hirasawa, Yōko Hikasa as Mio Akiyama, Satomi Satō as Ritsu Tainaka, Minako Kotobuki as Tsumugi Kotobuki, and Ayana Taketatsu as Azusa Nakano.

Disc 1 (Studio mix)

1. "カレーのちライス" – 3:16 (Curry Nochi Rice)
2. "わたしの恋はホッチキス" – 4:24 (Watashi no Koi wa Hotchkiss)
3. "ふでペン ～ボールペン～" – 3:57 (Fudepen ~Ballpen~)
4. "ふわふわ時間(タイム)" – 3:56 (Fuwa Fuwa Time)

Disc 2 ("Live" mix)

1. "カレーのちライス" – 3:20
2. "わたしの恋はホッチキス" – 4:30
3. "ふでペン ～ボールペン～" – 4:00
4. "ふわふわ時間(タイム)" – 4:05

=== Ho-kago Tea Time II ===
Ho-kago Tea Time II

Studio album by Ho-kago Tea Time
- Released: October 27, 2010
- Recorded: 2010
- Genres: J-pop, rock
- Label: Pony Canyon

Ho-kago Tea Time II (放課後ティータイムII, Hōkago Tī Taimu Tsū), pronounced Ho-kago Tea Time Second is an album by Aki Toyosaki as Yui Hirasawa, Yōko Hikasa as Mio Akiyama, Satomi Satō as Ritsu Tainaka, Minako Kotobuki as Tsumugi Kotobuki and Ayana Taketatsu as Azusa Nakano. Second disc is labelled as cassette mix. It's the recording that the members have done in anime (episode 23) and includes everything that was shown to be recorded. Initial copies also contained a cassette with the same recording. Track 4 on this disc also contains spoken word by Asami Sanada as Sawako Yamanaka.

Disc 1 (Studio mix)
No.	Title	Lead vocals	Length
1.	"いちごパフェが止まらない" ("Ichigo Parfait ga Tomaranai")	Yui Hirasawa	3:29
2.	"ぴゅあぴゅあはーと" ("Pure Pure Heart")	Mio Akiyama	4:35
3.	"Honey Sweet Tea Time"	Tsumugi Kotobuki	4:13
4.	"五月雨20ラブ" ("Samidare 20 Love")	Akiyama	4:03
5.	"ごはんはおかず" ("Gohan wa Okazu")	Hirasawa	3:12
6.	"ときめきシュガー" ("Tokimeki Sugar")	Akiyama	4:00
7.	"冬の日" ("Fuyu no Hi")	Hirasawa	3:16
8.	"U & I"	Hirasawa	4:36
9.	"天使にふれたよ!" ("Tenshi ni Furetayo!")	Hirasawa, Akiyama, Ritsu Tainaka, Kotobuki	4:42
10.	"Interlude"	Instrumental	1:00
11.	"放課後ティータイム" ("Ho-kago Tea Time")	Hōkago Tea Time (Kotobuki, Akiyama, Tainaka, Azusa Nakano, Hirasawa)	4:47

Disc 2 (Cassette mix)
No.	Title	Lead vocals	Length
1.	"Introduction"	Vocal introduction	1:06
2.	"ふわふわ時間" ("Fuwa Fuwa Time")	Hirasawa, Akiyama	4:31
3.	"カレーのちライス" ("Curry nochi Rice")	Hirasawa	3:37
4.	"わたしの恋はホッチキス" ("Watashi no Koi wa Hotchkiss")	Hirasawa, Akiyama	5:40
5.	"ふでペン ～ボールペン～" ("Fudepen (Ballpen)")	Akiyama, Hirasawa	4:26
6.	"ぴゅあぴゅあはーと" ("Pure Pure Heart")	Akiyama	4:45
7.	"いちごパフェが止まらない" ("Ichigo Parfait ga Tomaranai")	Hirasawa	4:17
8.	"Honey Sweet Tea Time"	Kotobuki	4:45
9.	"ときめきシュガー" ("Tokimeki Sugar")	Akiyama	4:13
10.	"冬の日" ("Fuyu no Hi")	Hirasawa	3:28
11.	"五月雨20ラブ" ("Samidare 20 Love")	Akiyama	4:53
12.	"ごはんはおかず" ("Gohan wa Okazu")	Hirasawa	3:35
13.	"U & I"	Hirasawa	5:05

=== Ho-kago Tea Time in Movie ===
Ho-kago Tea Time in Movie

Studio album by Ho-kago Tea Time, Death Devil
- Released: January 18, 2012
- Recorded: 2012
- Genres: J-pop, rock, speed metal
- Label: Pony Canyon

Ho-kago Tea Time in Movie (放課後ティータイム, Hōkago Tī Taimu in Movie), is a mini album with lead vocals by Aki Toyosaki as Yui Hirasawa, Yōko Hikasa as Mio Akiyama, Satomi Satō as Ritsu Tainaka, Minako Kotobuki as Tsumugi Kotobuki, and Asami Sanada as Sawako Yamanaka and backup vocals by Ayana Taketatsu as Azusa Nakano, and Yu Asakawa as Norimi Kawaguchi. First disc contains the insert songs from the movie by Ho-kago Tea Time. Second disc contains the insert song from the movie by Death Devil and its instrumental version.

Disc 1
No.	Title	Lead vocals	Length
1.	"カレーのちライス(映画「けいおん!」Mix)" ("Curry Nochi Rice (K-ON! The Movie Mix)")	Hirasawa	3:17
2.	"ごはんはおかず(映画「けいおん!」Mix)" ("Gohan wa Okazu (K-ON! The Movie Mix)")	Hirasawa	3:55
3.	"五月雨20ラブ(映画「けいおん!」Mix)" ("Samidare 20 Love (K-ON! The Movie Mix)")	Akiyama	4:04
4.	"U & I(映画「けいおん!」Mix)" ("U & I (K-ON! The Movie Mix)")	Hirasawa	4:38
5.	"天使にふれたよ!(映画「けいおん!」Mix)" ("Tenshi ni Furetayo! (K-ON! The Movie Mix)")	Hirasawa, Akiyama, Tainaka, Kotobuki	4:39
6.	"ふわふわ時間(タイム)(映画「けいおん!」Mix)" ("Fuwa Fuwa Time (K-ON! The Movie Mix)")	Hirasawa, Akiyama	3:12

Disc 2
No.	Title	Lead vocals	Length
1.	"光" ("Hikari")	Sawako Yamanaka	4:22
2.	"光 (Instrumental)" ("Hikari (Instrumental)")	Instrumental	4:19

== Character song singles ==
=== Season 1 ===
==== Yui Hirasawa ====
"Yui Hirasawa"

Single by Aki Toyosaki as Yui Hirasawa
- Released: June 17, 2009
- Recorded: 2009
- Genre: J-pop
- Label: Pony Canyon

1. "Giita ni Kubittake" – 3:33
2. "Sunday Siesta" – 3:38
3. "Let's Go! (Yui Ver.)" – 4:11
4. "Giita ni Kubittake" (instrumental) – 3:34
5. "Sunday Siesta" (instrumental) – 3:38
6. "Let's Go!" (instrumental) – 4:41

==== Mio Akiyama ====
"Mio Akiyama"

Single by Yōko Hikasa as Mio Akiyama
- Released: June 17, 2009
- Recorded: 2009
- Genre: J-pop
- Label: Pony Canyon

1. "Heart Goes Boom!!" – 3:36
2. "Hello Little Girl" – 4:42
3. "Let's Go! (Mio Ver.)" – 4:11
4. "Heart Goes Boom!!" (instrumental) – 3:36
5. "Hello Little Girl" (instrumental) – 4:43
6. "Let's Go!" (instrumental) – 4:10

==== Ritsu Tainaka ====
"Ritsu Tainaka"

Single by Satomi Satō as Ritsu Tainaka
- Released: August 26, 2009
- Recorded: 2009
- Genre: J-pop
- Label: Pony Canyon

1. "Girly Storm Shissou Stick" – 3:34
2. "Mokojise Happy 100%" – 3:17
3. "Let's Go! (Ritsu Ver.)" – 4:11
4. "Girly Storm Shissou Stick" (instrumental) – 3:34
5. "Mokojise Happy 100%" (instrumental) – 3:15
6. "Let's Go!" (instrumental) – 4:10

==== Tsumugi Kotobuki ====
"Tsumugi Kotobuki"

Single by Minako Kotobuki as Tsumugi Kotobuki
- Released: August 26, 2009
- Recorded: 2009
- Genre: J-pop
- Label: Pony Canyon

1. "Dear My Keys ～Kenban no Mahou～" – 3:34
2. "Humming Bird" – 3:17
3. "Let's Go! (Tsumugi Ver.)" – 4:11
4. "Dear My Keys ～Kenban no Mahou～" (instrumental) – 3:34
5. "Humming Bird" (instrumental) – 3:15
6. "Let's Go!" (instrumental) – 4:10

==== Azusa Nakano ====
"Azusa Nakano"

Single by Ayana Taketatsu as Azusa Nakano
- Released: August 26, 2009
- Recorded: 2009
- Genre: J-pop
- Label: Pony Canyon

1. "Jajauma Way To Go" – 4:29
2. "Watashi wa Watashi no Michi o Iku" – 3:18
3. "Let's Go! (Azusa Ver.)" – 4:11
4. "Jajauma Way To Go" (instrumental) – 4:27
5. "Watashi wa Watashi no Michi o Iku" (instrumental) – 3:17
6. "Let's Go!" (instrumental) – 4:09

==== Ui Hirasawa ====
"Ui Hirasawa"

Single by Madoka Yonezawa as Ui Hirasawa
- Released: October 21, 2009
- Recorded: 2009
- Genre: J-pop
- Label: Pony Canyon

1. "Lovely Sisters" – 4:36
2. "Oui! Ai Kotoba" – 4:00
3. "Lovely Sisters" (instrumental) – 4:36
4. "Oui! Ai Kotoba" (instrumental) – 3:58

==== Nodoka Manabe ====
"Nodoka Manabe"

Single by Chika Fujitō as Nodoka Manabe
- Released: October 21, 2009
- Recorded: 2009
- Genre: J-pop
- Label: Pony Canyon

1. "Coolly Hotty Tension Hi!!" – 3:54
2. "Prologue" – 4:36
3. "Coolly Hotty Tension Hi!!" (instrumental) – 3:53
4. "Prologue" (instrumental) – 4:34

=== Season 2 ===
==== Yui Hirasawa ====
"Yui Hirasawa"

Single by Aki Toyosaki as Yui Hirasawa
- Released: September 21, 2010
- Recorded: 2010
- Genre: J-pop
- Label: Pony Canyon

1. "Oh My Giita!!" – 4:14
2. "Shiawase Hiyori" – 3:45
3. "Come with Me!! (Yui Ver.)" – 3:34
4. "Oh My Giita!!" (instrumental) – 4:13
5. "Shiawase Hiyori" (instrumental) – 3:43
6. "Come with Me!!" (instrumental) – 3:32

==== Mio Akiyama ====
"Mio Akiyama"

Single by Yōko Hikasa as Mio Akiyama
- Released: September 21, 2010
- Recorded: 2010
- Genre: J-pop
- Label: Pony Canyon

1. "Seishun Vibration" – 3:38
2. "Soukuu no Monologue" – 4:29
3. "Come with Me!! (Mio Ver.)" – 3:34
4. "Seishun Vibration" (instrumental) – 3:37
5. "Soukuu no Monologue" (instrumental) – 4:28
6. "Come with Me!!" (instrumental) – 3:32

==== Ritsu Tainaka ====
"Ritsu Tainaka"

Single by Satomi Satō as Ritsu Tainaka
- Released: November 17, 2010
- Recorded: 2010
- Genre: J-pop
- Label: Pony Canyon

1. "Drumming Shining My Life" – 3:25
2. "Yuuzora a la Carte" – 4:08
3. "Come with Me!! (Ritsu Ver.)" – 3:34
4. "Drumming Shining My Life" (instrumental) – 3:25
5. "Yuuzora a la Carte" (instrumental) – 4:08
6. "Come with Me!!" (instrumental) – 3:32

==== Tsumugi Kotobuki ====
"Tsumugi Kotobuki"

Single by Minako Kotobuki as Tsumugi Kotobuki
- Released: November 17, 2010
- Recorded: 2010
- Genre: J-pop
- Label: Pony Canyon

1. "Diary wa Fortissimo" – 3:54
2. "Yasei no Jounetsu" – 4:38
3. "Come with Me!! (Tsumugi Ver.)" – 3:34
4. "Diary wa Fortissimo" (instrumental) – 3:53
5. "Yasei no Jounetsu" (instrumental) – 4:37
6. "Come with Me!!" (instrumental) – 3:32

==== Azusa Nakano ====
"Azusa Nakano"

Single by Ayana Taketatsu as Azusa Nakano
- Released: November 17, 2010
- Recorded: 2010
- Genre: J-pop
- Label: Pony Canyon

1. "Over the Starlight" – 4:08
2. "Joyful Todays" – 3:10
3. "Come with Me!! (Azusa Ver.)" – 3:34
4. "Over the Starlight" (instrumental) – 4:08
5. "Joyful Todays" (instrumental) – 3:09
6. "Come with Me!!" (instrumental) – 3:32

==== Ui Hirasawa ====
"Ui Hirasawa"

Single by Madoka Yonezawa as Ui Hirasawa
- Released: January 19, 2011
- Recorded: 2011
- Genre: J-pop
- Label: Pony Canyon

1. "Uki Uki New! My Way" – 4:10
2. "Shiny GEMS" – 3:26
3. "Come with Me!! (Ui Ver.)" – 3:34
4. "Uki Uki New! My Way" (instrumental) – 4:09
5. "Shiny GEMS" (instrumental) – 3:26
6. "Come with Me!!" (instrumental) – 3:32

==== Nodoka Manabe ====
"Nodoka Manabe"

Single by Chika Fujitō as Nodoka Manabe
- Released: January 19, 2011
- Recorded: 2011
- Genre: J-pop
- Label: Pony Canyon

1. "Jump" – 4:00
2. "Hidamari Living" – 4:54
3. "Come with Me!! (Nodoka Ver.)" – 3:34
4. "Jump" (instrumental) – 3:59
5. "Hidamari Living" (instrumental) – 4:53
6. "Come with Me!!" (instrumental) – 3:32

==== Jun Suzuki ====
"Jun Suzuki"

Single by Yoriko Nagata as Jun Suzuki
- Released: January 19, 2011
- Recorded: 2011
- Genre: J-pop
- Label: Pony Canyon

1. "Junjou Bomber!!" – 3:15
2. "Midnight Superstar" – 3:44
3. "Come with Me!! (Jun Ver.)" – 3:34
4. "Junjou Bomber!!" (instrumental) – 3:14
5. "Midnight Superstar" (instrumental) – 3:43
6. "Come with Me!!" (instrumental) – 3:32

=== Death Devil ===
==== "Maddy Candy" ====
"Maddy Candy"

Single by Death Devil
- B-side: "Hell The World"
- Released: August 12, 2009
- Recorded: 2009
- Genre: Speed metal
- Label: Pony Canyon

"Maddy Candy" is performed by Asami Sanada as Sawako Yamanaka.

1. "Maddy Candy" – 4:45
2. "Hell The World" – 4:48
3. "Maddy Candy" (instrumental) – 4:45
4. "Hell The World" (instrumental) – 4:47

==== "Love" ====
"Love"

Single by Death Devil
- B-side: "Genom"
- Released: June 23, 2010
- Recorded: 2010
- Genre: Speed metal
- Label: Pony Canyon

Love (ラヴ, Ravu) is performed by Asami Sanada as Sawako Yamanaka.

1. "Love" (ラヴ) – 4:29
2. "Genom" – 4:20
3. "Love" (instrumental) (ラヴ) – 4:29
4. "Genom" (instrumental) – 4:17

== Soundtracks ==
=== K-On! Original Soundtrack ===
K-On! Original Soundtrack

Soundtrack album by Hyakkoku Hajime
- Released: June 3, 2009
- Recorded: 2009
- Label: Pony Canyon

K-On! Original Soundtrack (「けいおん!」 オリジナルサウンドトラック) is the first original soundtrack of the anime series K-On!. The album contains 36 instrumental songs that are used as background music during the first season of the anime. It was released on June 3, 2009, in Japan by Pony Canyon. The whole album was composed, arranged and recorded by Hajime Hyakkoku.

1. "Have Some tea?" – 1:49
2. "Morning Dew" – 1:45
3. "Isoge ya Isoge!" – 1:34
4. "Kawai Inbou" – 1:42
5. "2 Hiki no Koneko" – 1:34
6. "Ii Yumemite ne" – 1:48
7. "Cotton Candy" – 1:52
8. "Virtual Love" – 1:51
9. "Tanpopo Takkyuubin" – 1:40
10. "Ukkari-kun no Tameni" – 1:38
11. "Genki!" – 1:39
12. "Obaa-chan no Tansu" – 1:49
13. "The other Side of Evening Sun" – 1:49
14. "Dead Soldiers" – 1:45
15. "Hold on Your Love" – 1:57
16. "Falling Reinforced Concrete" – 1:50
17. "Small Flashing" – 1:39
18. "Kendama-kun" – 0:09
19. "Karui Joudan" – 1:38
20. "Crepe wa Ikaga" – 1:33
21. "Happy Languidness" – 1:38
22. "Emerald Green" – 1:34
23. "My Hometown Where it Snows" – 2:03
24. "Ginsekai no Asa" – 1:47
25. "Tea at the Night of Christmas" – 1:58
26. "Koneko no Ensou Kai" – 1:34
27. "Patrol of Stroll" – 1:39
28. "Doki Doki Friday Night" – 1:43
29. "Ringo...Ringo...Ringo Ame" – 1:47
30. "15sai no March" – 1:39
31. "Jajauma 3nin Musume" – 1:47
32. "Hesitation" – 1:59
33. "Pinch Daisuki!" – 1:45
34. "Dress ni Crepe wa Niawa nai" – 2:02
35. "Ano hi no Yume" – 1:44
36. "Happy End" – 1:39
