= SM-Trax =

SM-Trax is an electronic duo from Germany consisting of producers Stefan Grunwald and Mirko von Schlieffen. In mid-1999 they went to number one on the US Hot Dance Music/Club Play chart with "Got the Groove", released on Groovilicious Records.

SM-Trax eventually went on to produce "... Is Calling" (also known as "SM-Trax Is Calling"), with lyrics discussing the nature of house music, while the chorus features a repeated "Wake up, SM Trax is in the club" line. "... Is Calling" was featured on the 2005 techno album Radikal Techno 6.

== Career ==
In 1997, SM-Trax released the single "Climb on Top" along with American singer Sweet Pussy Pauline (Candice Jordan). The song peaked at number 63 on the German singles chart and stayed on the chart for six weeks. In 1999, the single "Got the Groove" was released, which topped Billboard's Dance Club Songs chart in the United States. In Germany, the song reached number 58 on the chart. The follow-up single "... Is Calling" reached number 57. In 2000, SM-Trax were able to enter the German singles chart again with the single "At the Club". In the same year von Schlieffen left the music project. Their last release occurred in 2004.

== See also ==
- List of number-one dance hits (United States)
- List of artists who reached number one on the US Dance chart
