= Omoide wa Okkusenman! =

- A screenshot from the MAD Movie featuring the song

Song by Blue Fang (蒼い牙, Aoi Kiba)
- Language: Japanese
- Released: February 6, 2007
- Length: 2:49
- Composer: Takashi Tateishi
- Lyricist: Unknown

"Omoide wa Okkusenman!" (思い出はおっくせんまん！; translated as "110 million memories!" or "Countless memories!" (Note: The song's title is also sometimes written as Omoide wa Okusenman! (思い出は億千万！), which has the same meaning.)) is a song that has become an Internet meme in Japan. The original song was composed by Capcom composer Takashi Tateishi as the background music for Doctor Wily's Stage in Mega Man 2 titled "Wily's Castle (Dr. Wily Stage 1)", but was eventually rearranged by an individual solely known as "Blue Fang" (蒼い牙, Aoi Kiba). Lyrics were later written for this version of the song, and then posted to YouTube on February 6, 2007, by the user PiggKingg and then posted in full on February 14. The song describes the singer reminiscing about his childhood and friends, particularly pretending to be Ultraman/Ultraseven with them, while realizing his life and theirs is nothing like what it used to be.

== History ==
The first posting of "Omoide wa Okkusenman!" with vocals by an individual known as Gom occurred on YouTube on February 19, 2007.

A scene from the original flash animation for "Okkusenman!" featuring the subject of the song as an adult while a caricature of Ultraman plays on the TV in the background

The earliest postings of the song on Nico Nico Douga were on March 6, 2007, and sung by an individual (or group) known as "CHROMES", followed by Gomu's minutes later. While the original videos feature scenes taken from the Rockman 2 video game, an original flash animation of the song was made by an individual known as "Douro of DNA" (DNAのどうRO, DNA no Dōro) was uploaded on May 27, 2007, to Nico Nico Douga.

The original writer of the song's lyrics is unknown. When Nico Nico Douga attempted to discover the song's proper writer to include the song in one of their CDs, their campaign was unsuccessful and determined that it was written as a collaboration of users in the Nico Nico Douga and Japanese internet communities.

== Commercial releases ==
The popularity of "Okkusenman!" in Japan led to various covers on Nico Nico Douga and YouTube as well as commercial releases. Gomu's version was included as a track on the album CD de Kiite Mite.: Nico Nico Douga Selection (CDで聞いてみて。～ニコニコ動画せれくちょん～, CD de Kiite Mite. ~Niko Niko Dōga Serekuchon~; "Try listening on the CD.") released July 9, 2008. At the 2008 Animelo Summer Live concert, Hironobu Kageyama, Masaaki Endoh, Hiroshi Kitadani, Yoshiki Fukuyama, and Aki Misato performed a cover version of "Okkusenman!" to begin the second day's setlist. In 2009, JAM Project contributed a cover version of "Okkusenman!" to the album Nico Nico Douga Selection: Sainō no Mudazukai (ニコニコ動画せれくちょん～才能の無駄遣い～, Niko Niko Dōga Serekuchon ~Sainō no Mudazukai~; "A Waste of Talent") as its bonus track. In 2012 a Doujin music collective by the name of Sound Holic released an officially licensed Mega Man themed album called Rockman Holic, celebrating the 25th anniversary of the franchise. This album included an English adaptation of the song, under the name of "Together as One", sung by Nano (singer).
