= Niconico =

Japanese video sharing website

Niconico, Inc.
- Website type: Video hosting service
- Available in: Japanese
- Area served: Worldwide
- Owner: Dwango (Kadokawa Corporation)
- Creator: Niwango
- Website: nicovideo.jp
- Commercial: Yes
- Registration: Optional
- Launched: December 12, 2006; 19 years ago
- Current status: Active

Niconico, Inc. (Japanese: ニコニコ, Hepburn: Nikoniko), known before 2012 as Nico Nico Douga (ニコニコ動画, Niko Niko Dōga), is a Japanese video sharing service based in Tokyo, Japan. "Niconico" or "nikoniko" is the Japanese ideophone for smiling. As of 2021, Niconico is the 34th most-visited website in Japan, according to Alexa Internet.

The site won the Japanese Good Design Award in 2007, and an Honorary Mention of the Digital Communities category at Prix Ars Electronica 2008. Between June 8, 2024, and August 5, 2024, its servers were affected by a cyberattack and the website was partially active.

== History ==
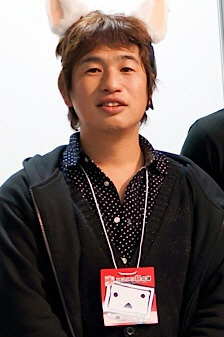
Nobuo Kawakami, the founder and CEO of Niconico

The first version of Niconico used YouTube as a video source. When the site grew, YouTube's server infrastructure strained due to increased traffic and bandwidth, leading YouTube to make a decision to block access from Niconico. As a result, Niconico ceased operations for two weeks. The site relaunched with an on-premises video server. On May 7, 2007, Niconico announced a mobile phone version of the website. Since August 9, 2007, "Nico Nico Douga (RC) Mobile" has serviced mobile phones of NTT DoCoMo and au.

By October 31, 2011, Niconico had over 23,690,000 registered users, 6,870,000 mobile users and 1,390,000 premium users. Due to the limited server capacity, Niwango limits the number of free users who can access the website at peak times (7 p.m. to 2 a.m.), based on the time of registration. The website is in Japanese, and the majority of the site traffic is from Japan, although approximately 4% is from outside Japan, notably one percent from Taiwan. Niconico launched a Taiwanese version of the site on October 18, 2007.

In July 2008, Niconico launched German and Spanish-language versions of the site, followed by an update for the Taiwanese-language version. An English-language version was added on October 17, 2012, superseding the Niconico.com website, with translation functionality allowing users to translate video descriptions into English or Chinese.

On April 27, 2012, Nico Nico Douga announced it would be rebranding itself as Niconico. The site also introduced a new "Zero" update, which improved video resolution along with various other upgrades.

Hiroyuki Nishimura served as director at Niwango until February 2013.

Niconico launched for the Nintendo Switch in Japan on July 13, 2017, and was the Switch's 1st 3rd-party media app in any market.

Support for the English and Chinese-language versions of Niconico were discontinued on July 5, 2023, with the company citing the advancements in automated translation as a reason to deprecate the translations of the user interface, with comment fields, video titles and video descriptions the only natively supported translation on the site.

As of October 30, 2024, Niconico made changes to their terms of service from being focused and based on Japanese law, to also being more inline with the laws of countries from where it is deemed their content is being viewed.

=== 2024 Ransomware attack ===
On June 8, 2024, a group of hackers called BlackSuit launched a ransomware attack on multiple Kadokawa-owned websites including Niconico, resulting in the website being taken offline. A feature-limited version of the website using select backup data was released on June 14. On June 27, the hacker group published a statement on the dark web claiming responsibility for the attack and threatening to publish 1.5 terabytes of stolen data on business contracts and users unless a ransom was paid.

=== Niconico.com ===
In 2010, an English version was in the works. Furthermore, in April 2011, an English-language beta website (Niconico) was launched. Unlike the Japanese counterpart of Niconico (nicovideo.jp), Niconico.com hosted videos from YouTube, DailyMotion, and Niconico. Similar to the pre-2007 version of Niconico, users can view the hosted videos via a version of the Niconico player, complete with commenting and tagging systems.

Niconico.com later introduced video upload and (for Premium users) live streaming functionalities. The site also simulcast select anime titles from June 2011. On October 14, 2011, Niconico announced a partnership with Funimation Entertainment to form Funico, to handle licensing of anime properties for streaming and home video. With the implementation of English language features into Nicovideo.jp, Niconico.com was retired on November 19, 2012, and used to redirect to the Japanese website until late 2016.

In March 2018, Niconico announced the end of English-language community services.

In October and November 2018, DDoS attacks from outside Japan led to disconnected services for some areas outside the country to combat these attacks.

In September 2019, the antenna shop "Niconico Douga Headquarters" was closed and its functions were consolidated into the new studio "Haresta" in Ikebukuro.

== Features ==
Users can upload, view, and share video clips. Unlike other video-sharing sites, however, comments are overlaid directly onto the video, and synced to specific playback times. This feature allows comments to respond directly to events occurring in the video, in sync with the viewer—creating a sense of a shared watching experience. Niconico's atmosphere and cultural context are close to 2channel's or Futaba Channel's. Many popular videos on this site have otaku tastes, such as anime, computer games, and pop music. Niconico offers a feature for users (not just the uploader of the video) to tag videos. Each video may have up to eleven tags, of which up to five the uploader may lock. Frequently, this functionality can be used not only as categorization, but also as critical commentary, satire, or other humor related to the video's content. Certain tags may have an explanation attached to them in the form of a Niconicopedia (ニコニコ大百科, Nikoniko daihyakka) article, some being proper descriptions while others having a more comedic tone. The site is also known for its MAD videos and its medleys of popular songs on the website, most notably Kumikyoku Nico Nico Douga. Niconico also distributed some original net animations, such as Candy Boy, Tentai Senshi Sunred, and Penguin Musume Heart.

Other features include:

- Mylist: each user may create "mylists", which function similarly to a list of bookmarks. Users can have up to 25 mylist folders, but the number of videos per folder depends on the user's membership status. A basic account can have 100 videos per folder, while a premium (paid) account has five times that amount (500). Under this limit, a free member can have up to 2,500 mylisted videos, while premium members can mylist up to 12,500 videos. Daily mylist activity is used to compute the default ranking view, although one may also sort by view or comment count. Mylists may be optionally made public and linked to; for example, to make a list of uploader's works (e.g., original songs or gameplay videos).
- Uploader comments: the uploader of a video may attach permanent comments to the video. This feature is suitable for some cases as subtitles, lyrics, or corrections.
- Nicoscript: by using special commands in the uploader comments, the uploader can add special effects to the video, including voting, automatic transfer to another video, quiz scoring, and other features.

== Business aspects ==
=== Income ===
The main income of Niconico comes from premium membership subscriptions, advertisements, and Nico Nico Ichiba (Affiliate).

Premium membership

Until early 2019, users need to register an account to watch videos on Niconico. There are two types of registered accounts; free (basic tier) and premium (subscription) accounts. The premium membership fee is ¥550 per month or ¥6,600 per year. As of January 2, 2012, they reached 1,500,000 premium members. Users can purchase a premium subscription via PayPal. Japanese users can also pay with mobile, credit card, Line Pay, and WebMoney.

Advertisement

Niconico uses Google Ads and other web advertisements. On May 8, 2008, Dwango announced a partnership with Yahoo! Japan and plans to adopt search-related ads and other Yahoo-related services.

Nico Nico Ichiba (Affiliate)

Nico Nico Ichiba is an advertisement system in which users can place banners freely on each video page. Uploaders and viewers can choose which items they want to place in the advertisement banners. Users also can know how many clicks each banner accrued, and how many items purchased. Ranking info of numbers of items bought through Nico Nico Ichiba is also officially provided. Items available are from Amazon.co.jp, Yahoo Shopping, and Dwango mobile service.

As of July 2010, Nico Nico Ichiba has been extended to the Taiwanese website.

=== Financial condition ===
On October 30, 2007, Dwango and the JASRAC (a Japanese copyright holders' society) agreed to form a comprehensive partnership. For this agreement, Dwango will pay two percent of its earnings to JASRAC as copyright royalties.

In the fiscal year from Q4 2010 to Q3 2011, Niconico has had a gross income of approximately 10.81 billion yen (US$139.1 million as of November 10, 2011), and posts a 670 million yen (US$8.6 million) operating profit.

== See also ==
- AcFun – Chinese video sharing website
- Bilibili – Chinese video sharing website
- Danmaku – Video game genre
- Gachimuchi – Internet meme started after a movie by American porn actor Billy Herrington was posted to Nico Nico Douga
- FC2 – Japanese blogging host
- Hatsune Miku – Singing voice synthesizer software
- Pixiv – Japanese online artist community
- Viddsee – Video entertainment platform
- VK – Russian social media and social networking service
- zoome – Japanese video hosting service (2007–2011)
- Let's Go! Onmyōji
