= List of Touhou Project fan games =

Touhou Project, a series of bullet hell video games created by Team Shanghai Alice, has been the source of a large number of unofficial derivative works. Among these are fan games: original games, usually created by doujin groups, that use Touhou characters and settings.

Name	Developer	Year	Genre	Notes
Super Marisa Land (スーパーマリサランド)	Twilight Frontier	2005	Platformer	Parody of Super Mario Land, with Marisa as the main character.
Super Marisa World (スーパーマリサワールド)	Double Cluster	2007	Platformer	Parody of Super Mario World.
Koumajou Densetsu: Scarlet Symphony (紅魔城伝説 緋色の交響曲)	Frontier Aja	2009	Metroidvania	Parody of Castlevania: Symphony of the Night. A remastered version was planned to release on Steam and Nintendo Switch in 2021. However, it was later delayed for July 27, 2022.
Gensou Shoujo Taisen Kou (幻想少女大戦紅; Fantasy Maiden Wars E)	Sanbondo	2010	Tactical role-playing game	Parody of Super Robot Wars. In 2019, all Gensou Shoujo Taisen games were bundled in the Gensou Shoujo Taisen Complete Box.
Koumajou Densetsu II: Stranger's Requiem (紅魔城伝説II 妖幻の鎮魂歌)	Frontier Aja	2010	Metroidvania	Sequel to the first Koumajou Densetsu.
New Super Marisa Land (魔理沙と６つのキノコ)	Twilight Frontier	2010	Platformer	Sequel to Super Marisa World.
Touhou Sōjinengi: The Genius of Sappheiros (東方蒼神縁起)	Strawberry Bose	2010	Turn-based role-playing game	Microsoft Windows dōjin game released at Comiket 78. Ported to PlayStation Vita, PlayStation 4 and Nintendo Switch in 2018.
Age of Ethanols (東方蟒酒宴)	Neetpia	2011	Real-time strategy	
DynaMarisa 3D (ダイナマリサ3D)	Twilight Frontier	2011	Third-person shooter	Parody of Earth Defense Force.
Touhou Gensō Maroku: The Devil of Decline (東方幻想魔録)	Strawberry Bose	2011	Turn-based role-playing game	Microsoft Windows dōjin game released at Comiket 81. Ported to PlayStation Vita, PlayStation 4 and Nintendo Switch.
Taisei project	taisei-project.org	2012	Bullet hell	Open-source Touhou fan game.
Gensou Shoujo Taisen You (幻想少女大戦妖; Fantasy Maiden Wars P)	Sanbondo	2012	Tactical role-playing game	Sequel to Gensou Shoujo Taisen Kou.
Satori Komeiji's Mental Education (古明地さとりの情操教育)	Twilight Frontier	2012	Puzzle	
Touhou Azure Reflections (舞華蒼魔鏡)	souvenir circ.	2012	Shoot 'em up	Microsoft Windows dōjin game released at Comiket 82. Re-released on Steam, and ported to Nintendo Switch and PlayStation 4.
Gensou Shoujo Taisen Ei (幻想少女大戦永, Fantasy Maiden Wars I)	Sanbondo	2014	Tactical role-playing game	Sequel to Gensou Shoujo Taisen You.
Fantastic Danmaku Festival (東方幕華祭)	Oriental Umbrella Festival	2014	Shoot 'em up	
Hifū Bōenkyō (秘封ぼうえんきょう)	Chiyuudou	2014	Tactical role-playing game	Released for Microsoft Windows in 2014, ported to Nintendo Switch in 2020.
Touhou: Scarlet Curiosity (東方紅輝心)	Ankake Spa	2014	Action role-playing game	Microsoft Windows dōjin game released at Comiket 86. Re-released on Steam, and ported to PlayStation 4.
Mystery Gensokyo: The Tower of Desire	Aqua Style	2015	Roguelike	Playstation Vita exclusive. In August, the game received an expansion pack, titled Mononobe no Futo and the 7 Trials.
Touhou : Nighter, Grinder and Uncut	PnFGaming	2015	Role-playing game	A Touhou fangame featuring three episodes and three side episodes featuring various playable characters in each episode.
Touhou Genso Rondo: Bullet Ballet (幻想の輪舞)	Cubetype	2016	Shoot 'em up	
Touhou Sky Arena: Matsuri Climax (東方スカイアリーナ・幻想郷空戦姫-MATSURI-CLIMAX)	Area-ZERO	2016	Third-person shooter	Enhanced release of the Microsoft Windows dōjin game Touhou Sky Arena: Kurenai released at Reitaisai 9, itself a sequel to Touhou Sky Arena, released in 2011. Re-released on Steam, and ported to PlayStation Vita, PlayStation 4, and Nintendo Switch.
Gensou Shoujo Taisen Yume (幻想少女大戦夢; Fantasy Maiden Wars D)	Sanbondo	2017	Tactical role-playing game	Sequel to Gensou Shoujo Taisen Ei.
Touhou Double Focus (ダブルフォーカス -文と椛の弾丸取材紀行-)	Aqua Style	2017	Metroidvania	
Touhou Genso Wanderer (不思議の幻想郷３)	Aqua Style	2017	Roguelike	PlayStation exclusive.
Touhou Kobuto V: Burst Battle (東方紅舞闘)	Cubetype	2017	Shoot 'em up	
MarisaLand Legacy (マリサランド・レガシィ)	Twilight Frontier	2018	Platformer	Remake of Super Marisa Land, with an added 4 player co-op mode.
RAIN Project - a touhou fangame	Kirisame Jump	2018	Platformer	
Remyadry	Kokoko Soft	2018	Dungeon crawler	
The Disappearing of Gensokyo (永遠消失的幻想鄉)	MyACG Studio	2018	Action role-playing game	Ported to PlayStation 4. The Disappearing of Gensokyo was the first Touhou fangame to appear on Steam.
Touhou Genso Wanderer -Reloaded- (不思議の幻想郷TOD -RELOADED-)	Aqua Style	2018	Roguelike	Comes with all of the base game's DLC, as well as additional playable characters and dungeons. Ported to Windows and Nintendo Switch.
Touhou Luna Nights	Team Ladybug	2018	Metroidvania	
Fantastic Danmaku Festival Part II (東方幕華祭 春雪篇)	Oriental Umbrella Festival	2019	Shoot 'em up	
Gensokyo Defenders (幻想郷ディフェンダーズ)	Neetpia	2019	Tower defense	
Gensokyo Night Festival (幻想郷萃夜祭)	tea_basira	2019	Metroidvania	Commenced Steam Early Access in 2019.
Gensou SkyDrift (幻走スカイドリフト)	illuCalab.	2019	Racing game	Released on Steam and Nintendo Switch in 2019. Several former Nintendo employees who worked on Mario Kart: Double Dash participated in the development of the game.
Inorikaze (祈風)	Astrolabe Draft	2019	Visual novel	
Touhou Cannonball (東方キャノンボール)	Aniplex	2019	Digital board game	Gacha game released on Android and iOS; service terminated in October 2020.
Touhou Genso Mahjong (東方幻想麻雀)	D.N.A. Softwares	2019	Mahjong	Nintendo Switch exclusive. Features ZUN as a guest character.
Touhou Ibunseki - Ayaria Dawn: ReCreation (東方異文石~アヤリアの夜明け：ReCreation)	Team L.U.R.Id Glow	2019	Digital board game	A "Monopoly-like game", in Early Access since November 2019. The developers claim finishing the game will take 3 months.
Touhou Labyrinth: Gensokyo to Tenkan no Taiju (東方の迷宮 幻想郷と天貫の大樹)	Cubetype, Nise-Eikoku Shinshidan	2020	Dungeon crawler role-playing game	Released on PlayStation 4 and Nintendo Switch in June 2020. Translated into English and released for Steam in October 2021.
Touhou Nil Soul (东方梦零魂)	Two-color lyophilic Butterfly	2019	Turn-based strategy	Early Access game. Version 1.0 launched in February 2020.
Touhou Dungeon Dive	Star Factory, Seven Volt	2020	Mobile roguelike	Japan exclusive. Features music from various dōjin circles, including IOSYS and Tokyo Active NEETs.
Touhou Endless Dream (东方夜光幻梦)	MyACG Studio	2020	Roguelike	Early Access since October 2020. The developers claim finishing the game will take 3–6 months.
Touhou LostWord (東方LostWord)	Good Smile Company, NextNinja	2020	Turn-based strategy	Gacha game released for Android and iOS. The game was released in Japan in April, and became available for pre-order internationally in October. The game was released internationally on May 11, 2021.
Touhou Mechanical Scrollery (幻想討幻経)	Mikosansaho	2020	Role-playing game	
Touhou MONEY STOCKS SHOPS (東方金株店)	ikasumiyaki	2020	Digital board game	Early Access since August 2020. The developers claim finishing the game will take 6 months.
Touhou: Shooting Star (東方流星譚)	Stardust Laboratory	2020	Role-playing game	
Touhou Spell Bubble (東方スペルバブル)	Taito	2020	Puzzle	Spin-off of Taito's Puzzle Bobble series. Released on Nintendo Switch as a digital exclusive. Siliconera called Touhou Spell Bubble one of the best games of 2020.
Hifuu Fragment	Phoenixx	2021	Visual novel	
Touhou Danmaku Kagura (東方ダンマクカグラ)	Aqua Style, DeNA, Xeen	2021	Rhythm game	Released for Android and iOS in 2021.
Touhou DollDraft	milliondoubts	2021	Real-time strategy	Announced in June 2021, released in August for Steam.
Kubinashi Recollection	Phoenixx	2021	Platformer	Planned to release in 2021.
Three Fairies’ Hoppin’ Flappin’ Great Journey!	Phoenixx	2021	Role-playing game	Planned to release in August 2021.
Touhou Multi Scroll Shooting 2	Skydash Studio	2021	Shoot 'em up	Planned to release in 2021.
Touhou Mystia's Izakaya (东方夜雀食堂)	Two-color lyophilic Butterfly, Re-0 Doujin Club	2021	Restaurant business simulation game	Izakaya management and cooking game with RPG elements such as ingredients collection and NPC questlines.
Touhou Perfect Sakura Fantastica	exA-Arcadia	2021	Shoot 'em up	Arcade game, remake of Fantastic Danmaku Festival Part II.
The Touhou Empires	Neetpia	2022	Real-time strategy	Planned to release in 2022.
Touhou Choushinsei	Ankake Spa	2022	Action role-playing game	
Touhou Artificial Dream in Arcadia	Bar Holographic Otaku	2023	JRPG	Shin Megami Tensei inspired dungeon crawler which takes place in the Touhou universe.
Valkyrie of Phantasm (幻想のヴァルキューレ)	Area-ZERO	TBA	Third-person shooter	Planned for release on PlayStation 4, Nintendo Switch, and Microsoft Windows.
