= Hopeless Masquerade =

2013 video game

- Developers: Twilight Frontier; Team Shanghai Alice
- Publisher: Twilight Frontier
- Series: Touhou Project
- Platform: Microsoft Windows
- Release: 26 May 2013 (Reitaisai 10)
- Genre: Fighting
- Modes: Single-player, multiplayer

Touhou Shinkirō ~ Hopeless Masquerade (Japanese: 東方心綺楼 ～ Hopeless Masquerade.; lit. "Eastern Tower of Heart Fabric") is a versus fighting game in the Touhou Project game series, announced on 5 October 2012. The game, by Twilight Frontier and Team Shanghai Alice, is labelled as the 13.5th Touhou game. The final version of the game was released on 26 May 2013 at Reitaisai 10.

== Gameplay ==
Preview in-game screenshot.

Like its predecessor, Touhou Hisōtensoku, Hopeless Masquerade is a two-dimensional versus fighting game, where two characters fight each other with various moves. This game features a completely different style of 2D sprites compared to the earlier fighter games. Match timers have been introduced, something not present in previous Touhou fighter games. It is also the first official game to have a native resolution of 1280×720.

Various new systems have been made specifically for this game, most notably a completely aerial-based combat system, special moves performed in a key combo system, and an Instant Guard system, which allows the player to parry attacks by blocking right before the attack hits to prevent spirit loss.

== Plot ==
A gloomy atmosphere fills the human village after a series of recurring disasters and catastrophes, as the villagers become uncaring and fall into disorder. Those of religion believe that they should seize control over those falling into disorder, as an opportunity to gather faith and restore order. A battle between three individuals competing over popularity and appeal becomes underway in Gensōkyō, namely the Buddhist priest, the Taoist, and the shrine maiden.

== Characters ==
Hopeless Masquerade features 10 playable characters:

- Reimu Hakurei - Main character. The miko of the Hakurei Shrine.
- Marisa Kirisame - Main character. Magician from the Forest of Magic.
- Ichirin Kumoi - Character from Undefined Fantastic Object.
- Byakuren Hijiri - Character from Undefined Fantastic Object.
- Mononobe no Futo - Character from Ten Desires.
- Toyosatomimi no Miko - Character from Ten Desires.
- Nitori Kawashiro - Character from Mountain of Faith.
- Koishi Komeiji - Character from Subterranean Animism.
- Mamizou Futatsuiwa - Character from Ten Desires.
- Hata no Kokoro (秦 こころ) - A menreiki who was born from the 66 masks that belonged to Hata no Kawakatsu. When one of the masks, the Mask of Hope was lost, it caused the humans to lose all hope and she decided to search for it, but it went in vain. She's a lifeless and emotionally devoid person, and she had to rely on her masks to properly express her emotions. All of her masks are in harmony with one another, but when she lost the Mask of Hope, it caused a severe imbalance and as such, she went berserk.
