= Touhou Hisoutensoku =

2009 video game

- Developers: Twilight Frontier; Team Shanghai Alice
- Publisher: Twilight Frontier
- Series: Touhou Project
- Platform: Microsoft Windows
- Release: August 15, 2009
- Genre: Fighting
- Modes: Single-player, multiplayer

Touhou Hisoutensoku ~ Chōdokyū Ginyoru no Nazo wo Oe (Japanese: 東方非想天則 〜 超弩級ギニョルの謎を追え; lit. "Unperceiving of Natural Law ~ Chase the Enigma of the Gargantuan Guignol") is a versus fighting game in the Touhou Project game series. The game, by Twilight Frontier and Team Shanghai Alice, can be played as a standalone game or as an expansion pack for the previous fighting game Scarlet Weather Rhapsody. In the Touhou Project overall, it is labeled as the 12.3rd Touhou game.

== Gameplay ==
Utsuho (left) using a projectile on Youmu (right)

Touhou Hisoutensoku stayed true to its predecessors in that it retained most of the Immaterial's basic system and moves. Projectiles are still the main attack feature, grazing is still an effective way of evasion, and the changing weather affects every match. In addition, Touhou Hisoutensoku added some new spellcards and a weather system for the characters to turn the tide of battle. Touhou Hisoutensoku also provides built-in support for multiplayer games over the internet, like its predecessor.

Characters from Scarlet Weather Rhapsody can be made playable in Touhou Hisoutensoku if the player also owns that game on the same computer. The imported characters have new moves and new winning dialog in the arcade and versus modes, though they do not have a storyline associated with Touhou Hisoutensoku.

=== Card deck system ===
Mostly identical to Scarlet Weather Rhapsody, Touhou Hisoutensoku allows the player to assemble a "deck" of 20 cards. Cards become available for in-play use as the player deals or receives damage. New cards can be obtained through various actions in gameplay (such as defeating an opponent).

Cards fall into three categories: System Cards, Skill Cards, and Spell Cards. System Cards include bombs (like in Immaterial, knocks the enemy back), weather change, and other miscellaneous options. Skill Cards upgrade special attacks to do more damage, allow the player to gain alternate special attacks, or both. Spell Cards are powerful attacks that automatically work once activated. Proper assembly of card decks according to the player's style is key to mastering the game, since the decks limit what the characters can do during a match.

A departure from Scarlet Weather Rhapsody is the personalized System Cards, each associated with a character. These replace the System Cards of Scarlet Weather Rhapsody.

=== Weather ===
The weather changes during a match, which subjects the two combatants to some handicap according to the weather, as listed below. There are no weather effects in the Story Mode, unlike in Scarlet Weather Rhapsody. Five additional weather types are introduced in this game, along with modifications of some old ones.

| Weather | Associated with | Effect |
|---|---|---|
| Temperament 気質 | N/A | No effect until the timer reaches 100. |
| Sunny 快晴 | Reimu Hakurei | Border Escapes are free; flight cost is halved. |
| Drizzle 霧雨 | Marisa Kirisame | Spell card damage increases. |
| Cloudy 曇天 | Sakuya Izayoi | Decreases spellcard cost by 1; increases the rate at which the spell gauge fills. The weather effect ends if any card is used. |
| Azure Sky 蒼天 | Youmu Konpaku | Special attacks can be canceled into other special attacks. Every special attack canceled into only costs half a spirit orb. |
| Hail 雹 | Alice Margatroid | Spirit Orb Recovery speed is doubled, increasing the damage of bullet-type specials. |
| Spring Haze 花曇 | Patchouli Knowledge | Melee attacks can be grazed, at the cost of spirit. |
| Dense Fog 濃霧 | Remilia Scarlet | Inflicting damage on an opponent restores a small bit of health to the player. |
| Snow 雪 | Yuyuko Saigyouji | Hitting an opponent will cause her to lose some of her card gauge. Cards lost this way are returned to the player's deck. |
| Sunshowers 天気雨 | Yukari Yakumo | Incorrectly blocked melee attacks result in an instant guard crush. |
| Sprinkle 疎雨 | Suika Ibuki | All special moves and Skillcard moves are upgraded to Level 4. |
| Tempest 風雨 | Aya Shameimaru | Walking and dashing speed increased; maximum airdashes/flies allowed increased by one. |
| Mountain Vapor 晴嵐 | Reisen Udongein Inaba | Spellcard hand is hidden and randomized. Weather effect ends if a card is used. |
| River Mist 川霧 | Komachi Onozuka | Causes the distance between players to oscillate. |
| Typhoon 台風 | Iku Nagae | Characters gain superarmor and will not enter hitstun, and also lose the ability to block. |
| Aurora 極光 | Tenshi Hinanai | Cause a random weather effect. |
| Calm 凪 | Sanae Kochiya | Hitting the opponent will cause a healing spotlight to fall on the player. |
| Diamond Dust ダイヤモンド ダスト | Cirno | Groundteching is disabled; knocked-down characters take damage from standing up. |
| Dust Storm 黄砂 | Hong Meiling | Attacks induce a counter hit state. |
| Scorching Sun 烈日 | Utsuho Reiuji | When high in the air, power increases, but health lowers gradually. |
| Monsoon 梅雨 | Suwako Moriya | Attacks induce groundslam/wallslam. |

== Plot ==
A mysterious giant is seen wandering around Gensokyo. It can suddenly appear and can just as suddenly vanish seemingly without a trace. Everyone who sees it becomes curious and wonders about the truth behind this strange sight. Sanae Kochiya, Cirno, and Hong Meiling each have their own fears and dreams about the giant, and each sets out in pursuit of this roaming behemoth.

Exploring the Forest of Magic, the Scarlet Devil Mansion, and the subterranea, the heroines face many challenges and obstacles in their pursuit of a mystery that's far deeper than it first appears.

== Characters ==
As a standalone game, Touhou Hisoutensoku only features 9 characters total (Including the Giant Catfish). Combined with the characters from Scarlet Weather Rhapsody, the game has a total of 20 characters.

- Sanae Kochiya (東風谷早苗) - The miko of the Moriya Shrine. She is one of the people who noticed the Hisoutensoku rampaging around Gensokyo.
- Cirno (チルノ) - The ice fairy of the Misty Lake. She thought the giant thing she saw was the great yokai Daidarabocchi.
- Hong Meiling (紅美鈴) - The gate guardian of the Scarlet Devil Mansion. She dreams that the Giant Catfish is the giant shadow and the one wanting her powers to come back to the earth and cause destruction.
- Reimu Hakurei (博麗霊夢) - The miko of the Hakurei Shrine.
- Marisa Kirisame (霧雨魔理沙) - A magician living in the Forest of Magic, who played a prank on Cirno.
- Utsuho Reiuji (霊烏路空) - The operator of the nuclear facility in the Hell of Blazing Flames.
- Patchouli Knowledge (パチュリー・ノーレッジ) - The resident bookworm of the Scarlet Devil Mansion.
- Alice Margatroid (アリス・マーガトロイド) - A puppeteer magician who also lives in the Forest of Magic. She was experimenting with Goliath-sized puppets, which caught Cirno's attention. She is the last boss in Cirno's Route.
- Suwako Moriya (洩矢諏訪子) - One of the goddesses of the Moriya Shrine and the last boss in Sanae's route.

== Development ==
Like with Immaterial and Missing Power and Scarlet Weather Rhapsody, ZUN of Team Shanghai Alice only did parts of the game while Twilight Frontier did most of the game-making. ZUN, besides overseeing the whole development, also provided the storyline, new character designs, spell card names, and three new music tracks for the game. The full version was released at Comiket 76 on August 15, 2009.

Unlike the main line of Touhou games, where the character artwork is drawn by ZUN, the dialog character sprites and ending artwork in Touhou Hisoutensoku are drawn by alphes from the Twilight Frontier team, as is the case with Immaterial and Missing Power and Scarlet Weather Rhapsody.

== Soundtrack ==
The soundtrack of the game was compiled into an album named Thermonuclear Deity Hisoutensoku ~ Touhou Hisoutensoku ORIGINAL SOUND TRACK (核熱造神ヒソウテンソク 東方非想天則 ORIGINAL SOUND TRACK), first sold in Comiket 77 on December 30, 2009.
