= Higurashi Daybreak =

2006 video game

- Box art
- Developers: Twilight Frontier; Cavia (PSP)
- Publishers: Twilight Frontier; Alchemist (PSP)
- Platforms: Microsoft Windows; PlayStation Portable
- Release: August 13, 2006; April 22, 2007 (expansion); November 27, 2008 (PSP); November 26, 2009 (PSP Mega Edition)
- Genre: Third-person shooter
- Modes: Single-player, multiplayer

Higurashi Daybreak (ひぐらしデイブレイク, Higurashi Deibureiku) is a Japanese dōjin third-person shooter developed by Twilight Frontier, first released on August 13, 2006, and is based on the popular visual novel Higurashi no Naku Koro ni. The game is Twilight Frontier's first attempt in making a 3D game. 07th Expansion, the creators of the original franchise, assisted in making the game — most notably, Ryukishi07, the writer of the original game, provided the script for Higurashi Daybreak. Also, this game uses the same voice cast as the drama CD of Higurashi no Naku Koro ni.

In the title, the "Bu" is made red (ブ), a practice similar to the original material. In Japan, the game is also called Hidebu, by taking the initials of the game (which, coincidentally, is homonymous to a well-known phrase in Fist of the North Star, where the nonsensical phrase is uttered by a fat grunt before he explodes).

Hirukowashi-hen of Higurashi no Naku Koro ni Rei, released on December 31, 2006, is a novelization of this game. Also, a related short story, "Higurashi Outbreak", was included in the original soundtrack of the game, which was released on April 22, 2007, along with the expansion Higurashi Daybreak Kai (ひぐらしデイブレイク改).

In April 2008, Alchemist announced that they would be porting Higurashi Daybreak to the PlayStation Portable, and released the port on November 27, 2008.

== Gameplay ==
In-game screenshot

The game is a two-on-two versus third-person shooter based on the system of the Mobile Suit Gundam VS Series. Each of the four players can be played by humans (either together locally or through netplay) or controlled by the computer. Each character has a choice of two to three different weapons, with vastly different properties. Actions such as dashing, guarding, jumping, or flying through the air are restricted by a "stamina" gauge — once that gauge is depleted, none of the said actions can be carried out, though the gauge refills itself when it is not in use. Also, a "charge" and "main" gauge determine what kind of projectile the player fires, and how many they can fire. And finally, there is also a "limit gauge" that can be charged in one of two ways: when the player is damaged, or when the player deals damage. Once the gauge is full, the player can go into Hypermode and receive some stat bonuses for a limited period of time. The game ends when a team's balloon reaches a preset limit (default at 100%); the percentage increases when a team member's HP bar gets depleted.

In the story mode, there are initially three storylines to go through, while more can be unlocked after the initial three has been played through. The teams are preset in the story mode, they are:

- The protagonists team (これぞ！主人公チーム) - Keiichi Maebara and Rena Ryuugu
- The twin sisters team (迷惑双子姉妹チーム) - Mion Sonozaki and Shion Sonozaki
- The chibikko team (頑張れちびっ子チーム) - Rika Furude and Satoko Hojo
- The lovers team (熱愛アベックチーム) - Jirō Tomitake and Miyo Takano
- The Okinomiya Police investigator team (興宮署特命刑事チーム) - Kuraudo Ōishi and Mamoru Akasaka
- The Hinamizawa School teachers team (雛見沢分校先生チーム) - Kyōsuke Irie and Rumiko Chie
- The Sonozaki yakuza team (武闘派園崎組チーム) - Akane Sonozaki and Tatsuyoshi Kasai
- The club leader's private team (部長さん内緒チーム) - Keiichi Maebara and Mion Sonozaki (expansion only)
- Together with Nee-nee team (ねーねーと一緒チーム) - Satoko Hojo and Shion Sonozaki (expansion only)
- Rena's take home team (レナのお持ち帰りチーム) - Rena Ryugu and Rika Furude (expansion only)

Although the teams are preset in the story mode, a team can consist of any two characters in other matches.

== Plot ==
In a peaceful day like any other, a small box was dropped on Rika Furude's head when she was sweeping in the Furude Shrine. In it was a pair of magatama, one red and one white. The magatama is actually the sacred treasure of the Furude Shrine. With its magical powers, the holder of the red magatama would unconditionally fall in love with the holder of the white one. Upon testing its effects on the school faculty, the club members of a Hinamizawa school decided that they should duel each other to see which pair gets to keep the magatama. In the beginning it was only an afterschool club activity, but their game eventually engulfed all of Hinamizawa.

== Characters ==
The character settings are based on the original visual novels.

Character selection screen in the expansion

Keiichi Maebara (前原 圭一, Maebara Keiichi)
Voiced by: Sōichirō Hoshi

- A balanced character with strong melee attacks and good ranged attacks.
  - Transfer student's bat: The bat offers an excellent range for melee attacks. Ranged attacks are basic but effective.
  - Invincible iron: The club ranged attacks have an explosion attribute, and are harder to dodge, but also harder to aim with them.
  - Evidence destructor shovel (expansion): The shovel specializes Keiichi on wide area attacks, which permits the player to cover more efficiently their partner with ranged attacks.

Rena Ryūgū (竜宮 レナ, Ryūgū Rena)
Voiced by: Mai Nakahara

- Like Keiichi, Rena is a balanced character with no particular weak points.
  - Favorite cleaver: The cleaver is her standard playstyle, balancing both melee and range aspects. While she doesn't have the melee range or ranged damage output of Keiichi's bat, her melee attacks are stronger and faster.
  - Blade-split axe: The axe offers a brutal playstyle, though at the expense of her ranged attacks. She becomes specialized in disabling and wide area attacks, but with much less accuracy.
  - Ironclad cleaver (expansion): The huge ironclad cleaver drastically changes her gameplay. Because of the blade heaviness, she cannot cancel her attacks, moves rather slowly, dashes on the ground for a much shorter distance and drains her stamina bar quicker on aerial movements. However, her attack power is extremely powered up, while her defense power halves the damage she takes and also offers her some resilience on hit stun, much like Oyashiro Hypermode. Also, her voice changes to reflect her delusional state when wielding this blade.

Mion Sonozaki (園崎 魅音, Sonozaki Mion)
Voiced by: Satsuki Yukino

- Mion is an agile ranged attack specialist, being weak in melee combat.
  - Dual wield pistols: The pistols gives a well balanced mix of firing speed, damage output, ammunition and reload speed.
  - Specially loaded water guns: The water guns are more powerful and deal a significant hit stun effect, but lack ammunition and have a slow reload speed.
  - Anti-riot water cannon (expansion): Much like the water guns, the water cannon is focusing Mion's playstyle on a more brutal and burst damage output at the expense of the hitstun, swapped with some knockback effect and recoil on herself. The projectiles are far less spread, focusing much more on straight and longer trajectories, with a much faster reloading and charging speed.

Shion Sonozaki (園崎 詩音, Sonozaki Shion)
Voiced by: Satsuki Yukino

- Shion is fragile melee character, lacking of good melee range. However, her speed and agility balance her handicap very well. Unlike her sister, ranged attacks are not her forte.
  - Combat knives: Designed for her standard playstyle, the knives are suitable for hit and run tactics and for fast assault, along with swift ranged attacks.
  - Modified stun guns: the stun guns offer a slower but stronger style, along with some wide area of effect attribute. This weapon also has a very special hitstun, as the projectiles electrocute the targets.
  - Torture chamber whips (expansion): The whips give her more opportunity to deal with ranged characters and can harass high defense melee characters, as the hitstun completely incapacitates the target and can deal damage on knocked characters.

Rika Furude (古手 梨花, Furude Rika)
Voiced by: Yukari Tamura

- Rika is a very slow and fragile character, lacking of melee options. However, she is extremely at ease whilst airborne, being a very versatile aerial fighter.
  - Ceremonial hoe: The hoe is her basic ranged attacks, using "all range" trajectories projectiles, with some good damage and explosion attributes.
  - Anti-cleaver girl mop: The mop is more specialized on widespread damage. The large energy attacks can bypass obstacles and buildings.
  - Scythe from the ritual tools shrine (expansion): The scythe changes her playstyle completely. While her defense is still a bit low, Rika has much better physical traits, being much more efficient on ground with much faster and stronger dash and melee attacks at the expense on her aerial abilities. While her ranged attacks aren't that powerful anymore, they are very efficient for any range with good damage, giving her a very nice balance between melee and ranged options. Much like Rena, this weapon changes her personality, being much more serious and cynical about fate and life.

Satoko Hōjō (北条 沙都子, Hōjō Satoko)
Voiced by: Mika Kanai

- Satoko is a very unpredictable melee character, dealing surprise attacks with a flexible pattern, though the damage is very weak. To compensate this handicap, she has various and different options for any range.
  - Selected fireworks set: The fireworks deal moderate damage but the projectiles are fast and can create a huge barrage, considering the high amount of ammo and the quick reload speed.
  - Satoko's Trap Lecture: Her trap mode is unique since she has no range attacks in that mode, but she can set traps that does various kinds of damage to whoever on the opposing team that activates the traps.
  - Homing fireworks set (expansion): This set of fireworks are much more powerful, giving her some solid options to deal huge damage. Consequently, the amount of ammo and the reload speed are fairly inferior to the first fireworks set. The missiles have a serious explosion attribute, which are better for the damage aspect, but can be a double edged weapon as she can hit her partner or even herself in the process.

Jirō Tomitake (富竹 ジロウ, Tomitake Jirō)
Voiced by: Tōru Ōkawa

- Tomitake is a strong melee character, with a moderate range and a good defense.
  - Survival camera: The survival camera is rather unusual, playing with the line of sight of the opponents regardless the range between him and his target(s), with weak but very fast ranged attacks. Tomitake can also blind his opponents.
  - Spiritual camera: The spiritual camera is a standard weapon, giving him a usual and direct approach in ranged damage.
  - Submachine gun (expansion): The H&K MP5 submachine gun is a versatile weapon, combining standard projectiles with his camera "sight attacks" and a unique melee dash attack.

Miyo Takano (鷹野 三四, Takano Miyo)
Voiced by: Miki Ito

- Takano is a support character, specialized in ranged damaging attacks. While she isn't exactly an autonomous ranged character, her support can be very effective, depending on her partner.
  - Toxic syringe: The syringes are her trademark playstyle, as Takano is dealing damage over time: set amount of damage, which follows up with a poison-like ailment that gradually decreases the victim's hit points. Note that the poison ignores completely the extra or minus defense of either character trait or buff (such like Hypermode and Match extra defense); which makes her the perfect (if not rigged) character against high defense opponents, but much less useful against low defense and agile characters. The poison cannot finish off a character with 0 hp, a direct attack is required in such instance.
  - Poisonous gas spray: Similar to the syringe, the gas spray uses the poison ailment, but in a widespread style with unpredictable projectiles, as their trajectories aren't straight forward.
  - Reinforcement transponder (expansion): The reinforcement transponder is suitable for hit and run tactics as the damage component is delayed, like her 2 previous poison modes. However, this approach deals direct damage instead, which is a more aggressive playstyle.

Kuraudo Ōishi (大石 蔵人, Ōishi Kuraudo)
Voiced by: Chafurin

- Ōishi is a very tough character, having a very high attack and defense power. Consequently, his ranged options and speed are compromised in exchange.
  - Favorite handgun: Oishi's revolver gives him various versatile options, optimizing his chances to get his target in range.
  - Hyper arm: This "weapon" makes Oishi specialized on brute force: he is able to grab his opponent and use him/her as a projectile. A very effective playstyle against tough melee characters, but it makes him completely helpless in term of mid and long range.
  - The confiscatory (expansion): The confiscatory gives him the ability to randomly pick up a ranged weapon, which improves a lot his usually poor ranged abilities.

Mamoru Akasaka (赤坂 衛, Akasaka Mamoru)
Voiced by: Takehito Koyasu, Daisuke Ono (PSP version)

- Akasaka is similar to Keiichi, being balanced in melee and ranged attacks. Of course, he doesn't have the range, nor the swiftness of his youth counterpart, but has a higher attack power and a slightly better defense.
  - Secret book of energy attacks: Similar to Keiichi's bat, this book gives basic but efficient energy attacks. These projectiles are generally weaker, slower and longer to charge than Keiichi's baseballs, but they are larger and two simple energy attacks can be fired consecutively. In addition, all energy attacks have some homing effect and the full charged shot bounces to the other opponent if it connects with the first opponent.
  - Secret book of karate: This book specializes Akasaka in a more brutal melee playstyle, at the expense of the range and speed of his projectiles. The charged and full charged shots are actually strengthened punch, which are very powerful, but only on a straight line.
  - Secret book of setsuna (expansion): This book works like Karate, but with an innate ability: counterattacks which are effective against either melee or ranged attacks. This playstyle is much more strategic, but its stall and timed aspect can be a handicap against swift characters.

Kyōsuke Irie (入江 京介, Irie Kyōsuke)
Voiced by: Toshihiko Seki

- Irie is another support character, specialized in status ailment ranged attacks. Much like Takano, Irie isn't exactly effective as a stand-alone character, but his teamwork is very effective.
  - Irie's deluxe medical treatment set: This first set deals low damage, but has the unique ability to heal his partner, whenever they are either hit by the projectiles or standing on the healing circles. It isn't required to aim the partner to heal them, as even stray projectiles will heal them.
  - Irie's deluxe hospitalization set: This second set deals good damage, and has the unique ability to reduce drastically the opponent attack power for a moderate period of time once charged completely.
  - Irie's deluxe support set (expansion): This third set deals average damage. Much like the two other sets, this one has a unique ability: boosting either the Attack or Defense power (or both) of your partner. The buffs duration can be extended, but the boost values are static.

Rumiko Chie (知恵 留美子, Chie Rumiko)
Voiced by: Fumiko Orikasa

- Chie is a fast and very agile character, having the largest combo moves set. Her movements resemble her model Ciel from Tsukihime. The reference is made more visible in the expansion, where Chie can wear a costume resembling those of Ciel's which, when worn, makes her talk like her Tsukihime counterpart. Like Ciel in Melty Blood, she cannot change directions when dashing.
  - Lecture-use T-square: This weapon gives to Chie some light but fast ranged attacks, resembling Ciel's trademark weapons, the Black Keys. This mode gives her the ability to deal with both opponents in melee and mid/long range.
  - Lecture-use compass: Much stronger, this weapon enhance a lot Chie's ranged abilities, at the expense of ammo and reload speed.
  - Lecture-use chalk (expansion): This weapon puts more emphasis on Chie's agile playstyle, giving more motion options.

Akane Sonozaki (園崎 茜, Sonozaki Akane)
Voiced by: Kikuko Inoue

- Akane is a very fast melee character, dealing great damage without having trouble to get close to an enemy. She has however a low defense and the "lag" between each melee attack make her approach a risk.
  - Mumei (無銘): The Mumei is very efficient in ranged attacks, giving her a good ranged support for her melee moves.
  - Tamahiki (玉弾き): The Tamahiki plays much more on melee playstyle. While Akane cannot deal with characters from afar due to the lack of projectiles, this weapon offers some support on her movements, making her approach easier. Much like how the name of the weapon suggests (lit. Shell Repeller), this weapon has the unique and innate ability to nullify any ranged attack if Akane hits the projectile with a good timing.
  - Iai katana (expansion): The Iai Katana is much more "brutal damage" based, with movements included, which gives more possibilities against high defense characters. This weapon is a great compromise between melee and mid-range situations.

Tatsuyoshi Kasai (葛西 辰由, Kasai Tatsuyoshi)
Voiced by: Fumihiko Tachiki

- Tatsuyoshi Kasai is a tough ranged character. Despite his stiff and slow movements, his defense and arsenal give him the ability to outlast any standard ranged characters.
  - Shotgun: The shotgun is the fastest weapon among the three, dealing good damage on one or several targets.
  - Machine gun: The AK47 assault rifle is more "wide area attacks" based, with a better damage output, at the expense of ammo and reload speed.
  - Sniper rifle (expansion): The sniper rifle has the slowest consecutive shot lag, and the slowest reload speed. However, the damage dealt is above average, and can deal 100% damage (on a normal match setup) on a character if the projectile hits the opponent's head. This playstyle is much more stalling and tactical, though the lack of flexibility is a serious handicap without a good partner.

Hanyū (羽入)
Voiced by: Yui Horie

- Hanyū is a new character, added in the expansion, not available in the story mode. She is the character with the worst defense, which makes her extremely fragile against brutal characters and melee in general. However, her weapons are flexible enough to deal with her weakness.
  - God's World: This first power gives her the ability to reflect any projectile with magical barriers. She can also freeze her opponents briefly, which can stall them (especially their hypermode, since the freeze effect doesn't stop the hypermode drain). Her final ability is a complete Time stop, freezing everything except herself for several seconds; this move is actually a parody of the same abilities exhibited by two characters from JoJo's Bizarre Adventure, namely the character Dio Brando; Hanyū even parodies one of his phrases when activating the technique. This weapon gives her the options to deal with both melee and ranged opponents and to support her partner as well.
  - Onigari no Ryūō (鬼狩柳桜): This second power gives her the ability to use energy attacks. It sets her playstyle into a more direct but ranged aspect. Onigari no Ryūō has also a unique special trait: Any Hypermode will transform Hanyū into a serious and wrathful self and will reveal the true form of Onigari no Ryūō: a sacred demon banishing sword. This "wrath mode" also doubles the usual duration of the hypermode, optimizing the effect of this state. This "fury state" gives her new melee and ranged attacks moves set and drastically increases her melee and ranged attack power.

Natsumi Kimiyoshi (公由 夏美, Kimiyoshi Natsumi)

Voiced by: Kaori Mizuhashi

- Natsumi is a new character, added in the expansion, not available in the story mode. She is a swift melee character, more balanced in regards of defense, while her speed doesn't completely match Shion's. She has however much more problem to deal with ranged characters, as her ranged options are inferior than most melee characters.
  - Mother's kitchen knife: The knife is straight forward, giving an aggressive playstyle. This weapon however lacks of versatility in general.
  - Grandma's saw: The saw deal damage with weaker but consecutive blows with each melee attack, being effective against tough characters and super armor in general. This weapon specializes much more on melee wide area effects, which permits Natsumi to deal with 2 melee opponents at once.

== Expansion ==
Cover to Higurashi Daybreak Kai

The expansion, Higurashi Daybreak Kai (ひぐらしデイブレイク改) was announced and released on April 22, 2007, in the convention Sunshine Creation 37. Aside from adding new characters and new teams, new features include a third new weapon for the original characters, new costumes, a new stage, a third mode to increase the limit gauge, and a functionality enabling observers in a netplay match. Minor balance adjustments were also implemented.

The "Kai" (改, revision) in the expansion's title is a homonym to the "Kai" (解, solutions) in Higurashi no Naku Koro ni Kai, which is the title of Higurashi no Naku Koro ni during its answer chapters (and also the title of the second season of the Higurashi anime).

== Higurashi Daybreak Portable ==
The PSP port was developed by Cavia, with the assistance from the original makers, Twilight Frontier and 07th Expansion. The port boasts revamped character graphics to match Alchemist's previous Higurashi ports, new storylines for Hanyū and Natsumi, new costumes and weapons, a new opening animation with a theme song, as well as a "shop" feature.

An enhanced version, Higurashi Daybreak Portable Mega Edition, was released on November 26, 2009. This new version features three new characters—Satoshi, Miyoko, and Okonogi—alongside new stages, several changes and revamped storylines.
