= Touhou Project fandom =

Fan community

Cosplay of Reimu Hakurei, the central protagonist of Touhou Project, at Comiket 107, 2026

Taisei Project is a free fan game based on Touhou Project

Touhou Project is a bullet hell video game series created by independent Japanese doujin soft developer Team Shanghai Alice, a one-person circle run by ZUN. ZUN originally wanted to publish his music without being limited to incorporating it into existing games. The first game in the series, Highly Responsive to Prayers, was released in 1997.

The series became popular in 2002 following the release of Embodiment of Scarlet Devil. The series subsequently gained international reach alongside the rise of the Internet and digital platforms. Numerous fan-made works related to Touhou Project have been released, with ZUN's lenient restrictions toward derivative works often regarded as a factor in the series' popularity. There are other Touhou-only events in Japan besides Comiket, with Reitaisai in Kanto and Kouroumu in Kansai being among the most popular.

== Background ==
The Japanese video game industry rose to prominence following the emergence of personal computers in the 1980s. In the 1990s, ZUN, a college student at the time, wanted to publish his music without being limited to existing games and decided to develop his own doujin soft games. In 1996, ZUN released Highly Responsive to Prayers, the first game in the Touhou Project series.

ZUN formed the one-man doujin circle named Team Shanghai Alice and published the series's sixth entry, Embodiment of Scarlet Devil, at Comiket 62 in 2002. It is also the first work that was released for Microsoft Windows. With the Internet's rapid development in the 2000s, the series' popularity increased, while its fandom culture also began to spread internationally. In the 2010s, amidst the internationalization of the doujin scene through digital platforms, doujin games also became increasingly popular overseas. ZUN stated that doujin games were "starting to become indie".

=== ZUN's attitude ===
Touhou Project is regarded as a typical example of database consumption. These doujin activities are mostly responsible for adding original attributes to characters that ZUN may not have intended. In Japan, works are protected by copyright law, and derivative works may be liable for infringing the original work's copyright. ZUN, on the other hand, has acknowledged, appreciated, and even encouraged these derivative works for the most part. ZUN's tolerant attitude on doujin activities has helped the fandom flourish.

ZUN published an official guide outlining proper practice for the creation and distribution of Touhou fan material. It allows anyone to release derivative works without obtaining permission from Team Shanghai Alice as long as they comply with the official guidelines, including obeying public policy doctrine and "a customary means for the same person and the content". The guidelines were amended in 2016 to permit Let's Play videos of the series. Proper attribution, restrictions on spoiling endings, and prohibitions on unauthorized commercial distribution are other noted restrictions. Creators of derivative works are asked to refrain from crowdfunding their projects.

== Community ==
Cosplay of characters from the series

Remilia Scarlet

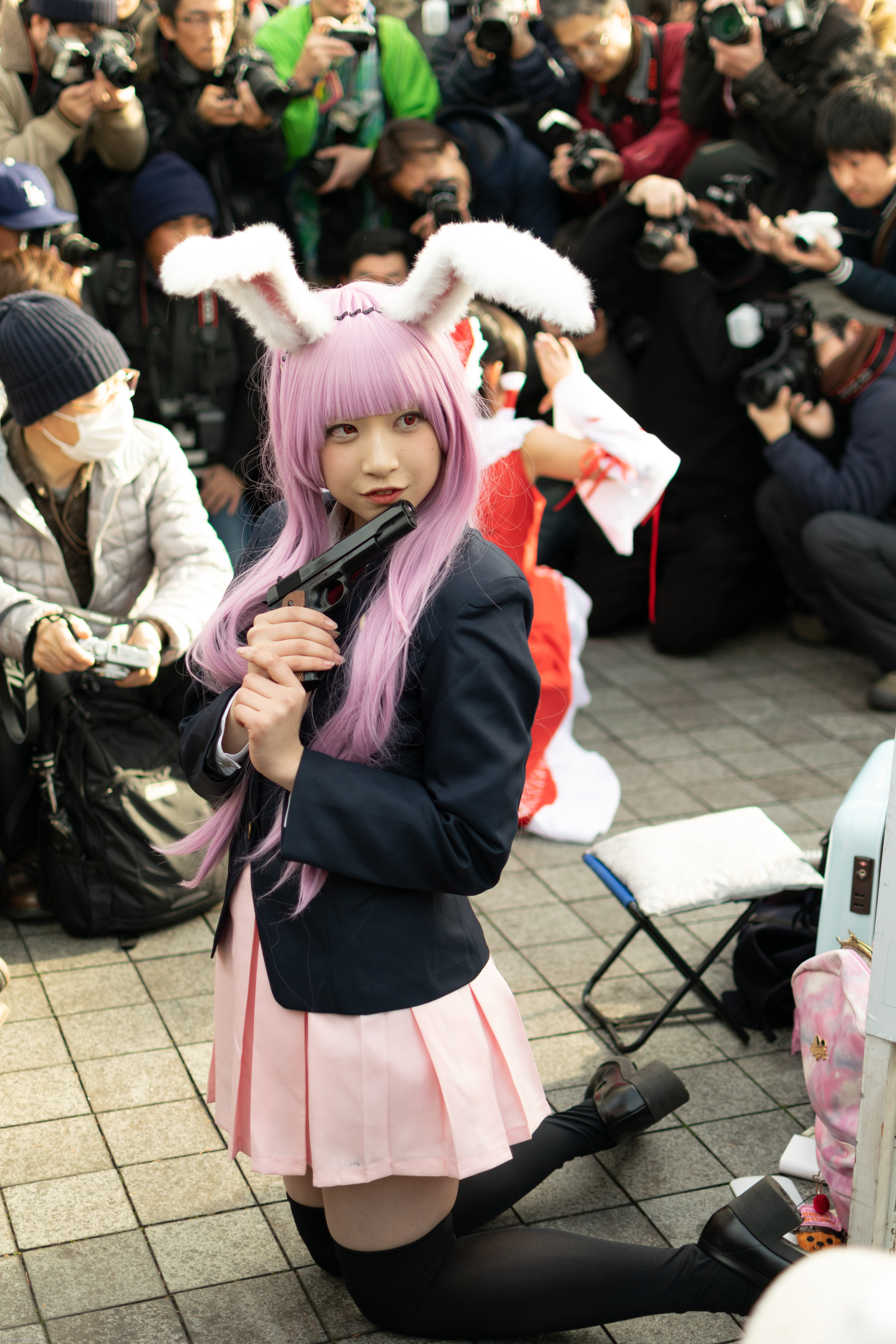
Reisen Udongein Inaba

=== Demography ===
A survey conducted by the Comic Market Committee in 2009 lists the average age of Touhou Project fans among Comiket attendees as 24.8 years of age. According to the results of the Touhou Project Popularity Poll 2023, almost 40% of respondents to the poll were aged 15 to 19 years old, while people over 25 years old made up only about 20%. A later survey conducted by Nikkei Entertainment from December 16, 2023, with a sample size of 50,000 participants across various different fandoms, showed that respondents who considered themselves devoted fans of Touhou Project within Japan had an average age of 23 years, and a male-to-female ratio that skews 85:15.

=== Prizes ===
Touhou Project was nominated for the 11th annual Media Arts Awards held by Japan's Agency for Cultural Affairs, under the Entertainment category, where Touhou Project eventually lost to Nintendo's Wii Sports for the Grand Prize award. The series was inducted into the Guinness World Records in October 2010 as the "most prolific fan-made shooter series".

=== Comiket ===
A graph comparing the participation of doujin circles at Comic Market (Comiket) 85 (December 2013)

The first publication of Touhou Project derivative doujinshi occurred during December 2003, following the release of Perfect Cherry Blossom; seven circles sold Touhou Project derivative works at Comiket 65 in December 2003. At Comiket 74 in August 2008, a total of 885 circles had Touhou Project derivative works on display or for sale, out of a total of 35,000 circles participating at Comiket. At Comiket 77 (December 2009), 2,372 circles were dedicated to Touhou Project, breaking the previous record held by The Prince of Tennis at Comiket 66 (August 2004), which had 2,130 circles. At Comiket 85 (December 2013), Touhou Project was still in the lead, with 2,272 participating circles selling Touhou Project derivatives, compared to Kuroko's Basketball, the second most popular franchise at that year's Comiket, which had 1,462 circles. Throughout the mid-2010s, Touhou Project's popularity at Comiket began to wane. From 2015 to 2017, Kantai Collection was consistently the most popular series at Comiket. By 2019, Touhou Project was the fourth most popular series at Comiket, with less than half the circles at Comiket than the Fate series.

View source data.
Doujin circles registered under the Touhou Project genre since Comiket 65 (December 2003)

== Touhou conventions ==
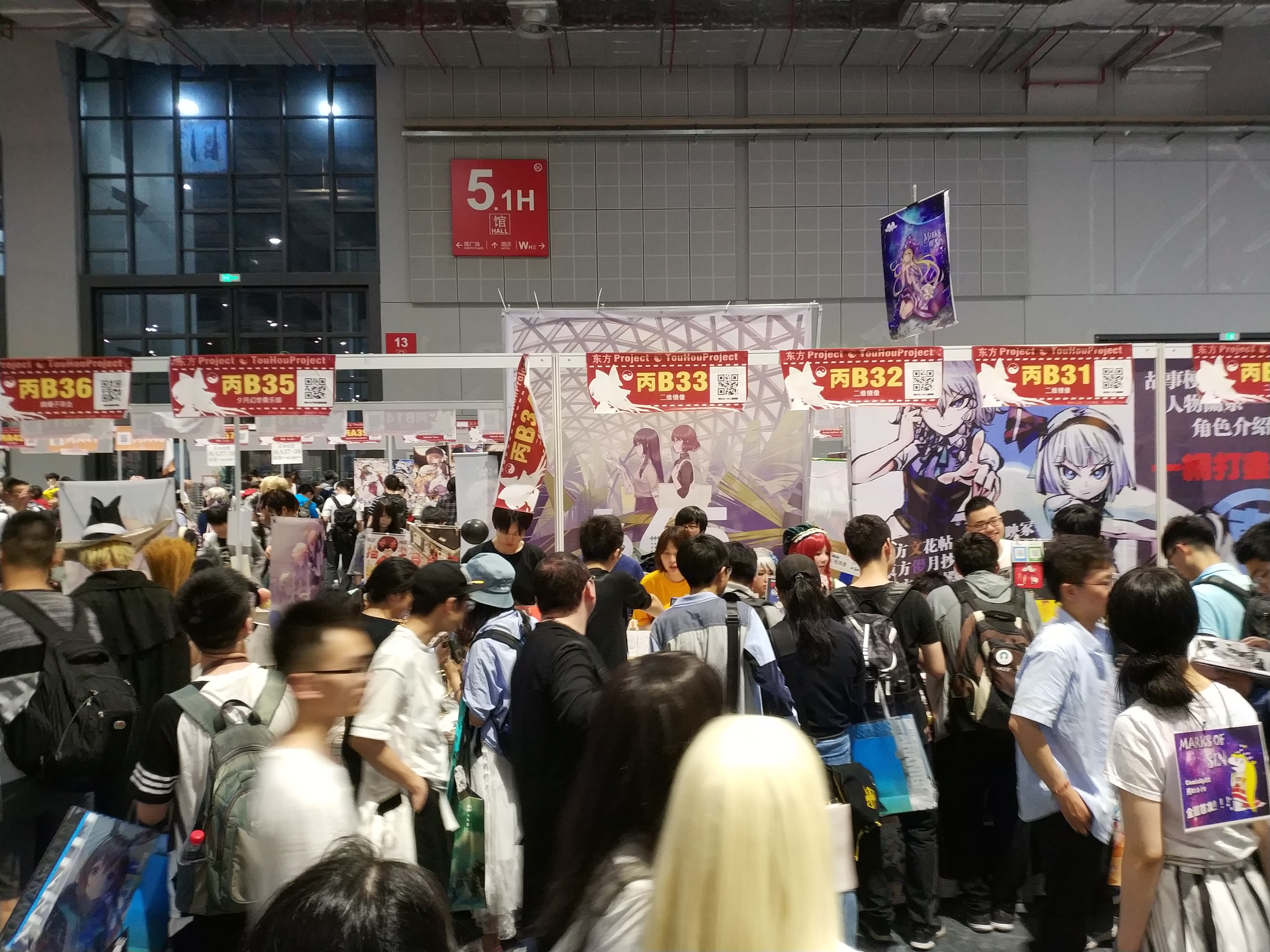
Touhou booth at 22st Comicup (2018) in Shunghai, China

Events that host Touhou Project content exclusively are called Touhou-only (東方オンリー). The first Touhou-only event was Reitaisai, held in Kanto, Japan, in 2004. Over one hundred circles participated in the event at the time. Starting in 2005, the first Touhou Kouroumu event was held in Kansai, which became a popular Touhou-Only event in later years. Among all Touhou circles, four in ten circles would attend Reitaisai and Kouroumu.

Touhou-only events quickly grew and reached their peak in 2008–2010. Participation in these conventions mostly stabilized by the 2010s, including Reitaisai and Kouroumu, while other Touhou-Only events begun to slow down, or even shrink. The number of participating circles in Reitaisai and Kouroumu has also begun to decline from 2014.

=== Reitaisai ===
Reitaisai SP2 in 2011

The Hakurei Shrine Reitaisai (博麗神社例大祭, Hakurei Jinja Reitaisai; Hakurei Shrine's Regular Grand Festival) is the largest Touhou-Only convention. Although the coordinator of this convention is unrelated to Team Shanghai Alice, the name "Hakurei Shrine Reitaisai" was given by ZUN himself.

The first Reitaisai convention was held on April 18, 2004, in Ōta, Tokyo, featuring a total of 114 participating circles. Team Shanghai Alice also released demo versions of its upcoming games, Imperishable Night and Immaterial and Missing Power. The convention featured a total of 114 participating circles.

Since then, many Touhou Project derivative works have been sold at Reitasai, and it has become the largest Touhou-only convention. In 2010, an additional Reitaisai convention called "Reitaisai SP" (例大祭SP) was started. It was held every autumn due to its increasing popularity, but was cancelled after 2011, and later brought back and rebranded as "Autumn Reitaisai" (博麗神社秋季例大祭). The first Autumn Reitaisai was held on November 24, 2014.

The 2011 Reitaisai was originally cancelled due to safety concerns after the 2011 Tōhoku earthquake and tsunami, and the release of Ten Desires was also postponed. It was later rescheduled and held on May 8, 2011, with approximately 4,940 participating circles. The 17th Reitaisai in 2020, which was originally going to run on March 22 before being postponed to May 17, was ultimately cancelled due to safety concerns over the COVID-19 pandemic, making it the first Reitaisai to be cancelled.

Starting in 2015, Reitaisai began holding events in Taiwan. It was suspended from 2019 to 2024 and resumed in 2024.

=== Kouroumu ===
Touhou Kouroumu (東方紅楼夢, Touhou Kouroumu; Eastern Dream of the Red Chamber) is an annual Touhou-Only event held in Kansai. It is the second largest Touhou-only event after Reitaisai, and they are called "The Big Two in Touhou-only events". (Note: 東方Projectオンリーイベンドの二大巨頭)

== Derivative works ==
Many derivative works based on Touhou Project have been created since the release of Embodiment of Scarlet Devil, including doujinshi, doujin music, (Note: Many of the songs had been made remixing the original games' music.) doujin anime, and doujin games. (Note: Touhou Project games themselves are also doujin games.) The vast scope of Touhou Project derivatives prompted commentary, noting that Touhou Project became an unmissable aspect of Japanese consumer generated media.

=== Music ===
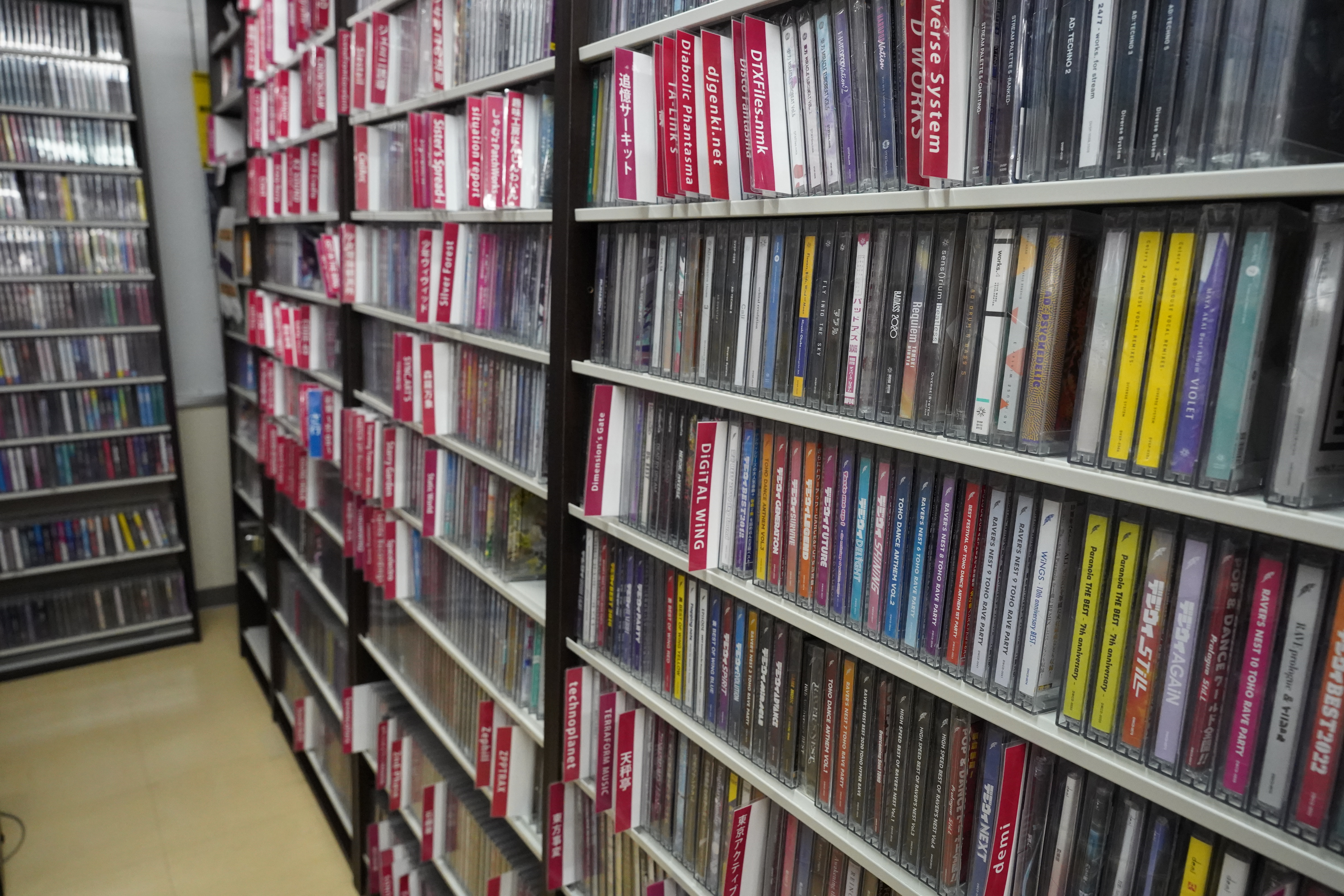
Shelves of Touhou derivative fanwork music album CDs at a store in Akihabara, with laminated dividers categorising CDs by doujin circle

The music of Touhou Project has been a particular source of interest, and many arrangement CDs are sold at Comiket and other Japanese conventions. Among the most popular derivatives are the series of Flash music videos created by the doujin music circle IOSYS, which are often shared on otaku internet forums and Niconico. One such song, "Marisa Stole the Precious Thing", has been heavily referenced and parodied in derivative anime music videos and Internet memes. "Marisa Stole the Precious Thing", alongside "Cirno's Perfect Math Class", "Night of Nights", and "Bad Apple!!" were included in the video game Touhou Spell Bubble. Toby Fox, the creator of Undertale, cited Touhou Project as one of his musical influences.

==== Bad Apple!! ====
"Bad Apple!!", one of the most famous pieces of Touhou music, was originally composed by ZUN as the Stage 3 theme for the fourth game, Lotus Land Story, released on August 14, 1998. According to ZUN, he aimed for a song that sounded "as old-fashioned as possible". It was later included in the soundtrack collection Akyu's Untouched Score vol.1, released at the third Hakurei Shrine Reitaisai in 2006.

The song saw a massive surge in popularity following a 2007 arrangement by the doujin circle Alstroemeria Records titled "Bad Apple!! feat. nomico". Arranged by Masayoshi Minoshima with vocals by the singer nomico, this version was released on the album Lovelight on May 20, 2007, at the 4th Hakurei Shrine Reitaisai. The lyrics, written by Haruka, utilize the English idiom "bad apple" (referring to a rotten apple that spoils the barrel) to depict a protagonist struggling with apathy, introspection, and a desire to completely "change to white" or "turn to black." Between May 2017 and August 2018, Alstroemeria Records released three commemorative albums—10th Anniversary Bad Apple!!, PHASE 2, and PHASE 3—featuring various remixes and covers of the track.

The visual component that cemented the song's internet fame began on June 8, 2008, when a user named Μμ uploaded a crude storyboard video to Niconico based on a shortened version of the song, asking for someone to animate it. On October 27, 2009, a Niconico user named Anira (Japanese: あにら) published a completed black-and-white shadow play animation based on the storyboard. The video, which features characters such as Reimu Hakurei and Marisa Kirisame transitioning fluidly while dancing, quickly gained popularity, reaching #1 on the Niconico daily rankings on November 15, 2009. Alstroemeria Records themselves praised the video, describing the motion as beautiful. By March 2023, Anira's shadow art video had achieved over 30 million views on Niconico alone, making it the most-viewed Touhou-related video on the site. In January 2025, a YouTube upload of the shadow art video surpassed 100 million views; however, as the video was an unauthorized reprint, the community encouraged viewers to support the official version uploaded by Alstroemeria Records to assert ownership. The video's global impact has been significant enough to warrant coverage by major international media such as CNN.

Following the success of the shadow art video, "Bad Apple!! feat. nomico" was integrated into various official rhythm games and karaoke services. A limited version of Taiko no Tatsujin featuring the song was exhibited at Niconico Chokaigi 2 in 2013. In 2019, DAM began distributing the song for karaoke, followed by Karaoke Joysound in 2020, which included the music video. In 2020, the mobile game BanG Dream! Girls Band Party! added a cover version by the in-game band Roselia (vocals by Aina Aiba). The song was also added to Muse Dash in September 2021 as part of a collaboration pack. In 2022, the rhythm game Touhou Danmaku Kagura included both the standard arrangement and a "Tetsuya Komuro Remix". In May 2024, the game Project Sekai: Colorful Stage! feat. Hatsune Miku released a cover by the unit "25-ji, Nightcord de." accompanied by a 2D music video paying homage to the original shadow art.

The song and its shadow art video also became a staple in the demoscene and retrocomputing communities, often used to demonstrate the capabilities of hardware presumed incapable of playing back full-motion video. Peter Dell, a programmer who contributed to a port, described the video as having become a graphical equivalent to "Hello, World!" programs for retro platforms. Notable recreations include:

- IBM PC/XT (Intel 8088): In April 2014, the video was played on an IBM Personal Computer XT equipped with an Intel 8088 CPU at a resolution of 640×200 and a frame rate of 30 fps.
- Commodore 64: A port running at 12 fps on the Commodore 64 appeared in June 2014.
- Consoles: By 2015, ports had been created for the Vectrex, Atari 2600, Nintendo Entertainment System, and Sega Genesis, as well as the TI-84 Plus series of graphing calculators.
- Microcontrollers: In 2019, an Arduino Mega played the video (without audio) at 128×176 resolution and 60 fps. The physics club at Rokko Junior/Senior High School also displayed the video on an oscilloscope using a Raspberry Pi.
- Apple IIe: A version played on an Apple IIe without any hardware modifications was released in 2021.
- Software and Physics: In 2021, the YouTube channel "Plugla" (formerly Yukkuri AI Channel) recreated the video using cell painting in Excel. In 2023, a user named zboy recreated the video using graphing functions in Desmos, successfully filling in the colors with mathematical formulas rather than just outlining them. A 2024 implementation by engineer Waldemar Erk embedded the animation frames directly into a font file using WebAssembly inside the HarfBuzz text shaping engine. Other mediums have included stop motion using actual apples, Rubik's Cubes, Minecraft "Steve" heads, Tesla coils, lasers, and a performance by the traditional Japanese instrument group "Kineie Nami Shachu" featuring Shamisen, Koto, Shakuhachi, and Taiko.

=== Games ===
A maid café featuring Touhou Gensou Eclipse, a Touhou commercialized mobile game, in Taichung, Taiwan

Due to the tolerant guidelines for derivative works, there are many fan games based on Touhou Project. While some of them adapt other game series' mechanics with Touhou Project characters, such as Koumajou Densetsu: Scarlet Symphony, which is based on Castlevania, original games are also available, such as an RPG called Labyrinth of Touhou.

The official guidelines regarding commercialization made finding physical copies of Touhou Project fan games in the West difficult until 2014. In 2014, Sony and Mediascape launched the "Play, Doujin!" (formally named "ZUN×PlayStation") initiative, which ZUN was involved in, allowing fan-made Touhou games to be ported to other platforms. The first three Touhou fan games to be ported were released on PlayStation 4 in September 2014. Since then, more Touhou fan games have been released on various platforms such as PS4, Switch and Steam. Yuyuko Saigyouji and Reimu Hakurei also made cameo character appearances in Square Enix's game Lord of Vermilion Re:2.

=== Anime ===
Several fanmade anime have been created for Touhou Project. ZUN has stated that no official anime would be made due to concerns over altering the series's target audience from shoot 'em up gamers. Even for fanmade anime, ZUN suggested that creators should not have excessive advertising, and restrict distribution. Due to the official author's position, little progess were made of these fanmade anime.

Although these projects are created by amateur studios, they have sometimes included appearances by professional voice actors, including Rie Tanaka, among others. Doujin anime of note include Fantasy Kaleidoscope ~ The Memories of Phantasm (幻想万華鏡) by the circle Manpuku Jinja in 2011, A Summer Day's Dream (夢想夏郷) by the doujin circle Maikaze, and Hifuu Club Activity Record ~ The Sealed Esoteric History (秘封活动记录) by the Chinese doujin circle Kyoto Fantasy Troupe.

A derivative anime from a commercial anime studio came in the form of Anime Tenchou x Touhou Project (アニメ店長 x 東方Project) by Ufotable to celebrate the 10th anniversary of Japanese goods chain Animate as a promotional video for the store combining Touhou Project with Animate's mascot, Meito Anizawa.

=== "Yukkuri shite itte ne!!!" ===
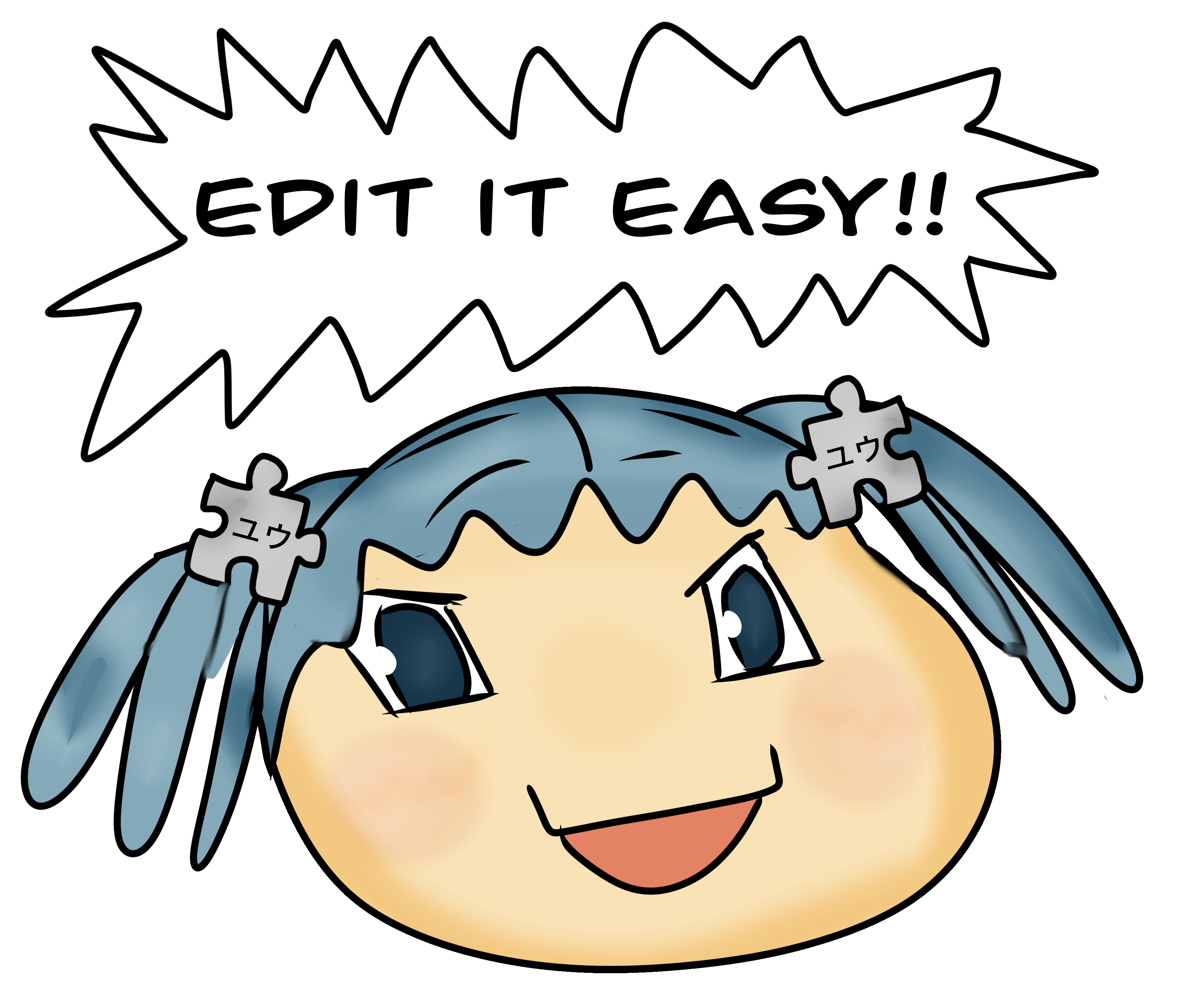
Wikipe-tan drawn in the yukkuri style

A major Internet meme based on Touhou Project is "Yukkuri shite itte ne!!!" (ゆっくりしていってね!!!; often translated as "You should be taking it easy!!!"), which centers around the disembodied, deformed heads of Touhou Project characters, often referred to as "yukkuris". This meme originated from a crude attempt to draw the main characters Reimu and Marisa with Shift JIS art in late 2007.

Yukkuris became so popular that the phrase "Yukkuri shite itte ne!!!" won bronze for 2008's Internet Buzzword Awards in Japan. It also appeared in Internet advertisements, the anime Natsu no Arashi! and Pani Poni, and games like Needy Streamer Overload and most notably, the front page of 2channel, one of the most visited Japanese websites.

The yukkuris are often given voices by the text-to-speech synthesizer SofTalk, and it has become popular in Japan to use yukkuris to stand-in and narrate online videos to the point that they became known as a genre called Yukkuri videos (ゆっくり動画).

On May 15, 2022, a YouTuber unrelated to the Touhou fandom announced that they had registered the trademark rights of "Yukkuri-Chaban-Theater" (ゆっくり茶番劇) and would set an annual fee as the royalty, provoking backlash and criticism due to the perception of someone unrelated to the fandom commercializing its culture. Later, Dwango, which operates Nico Nico Douga, launched a negotiation to have the rights waived. The YouTuber announced that they had "decided to forego the trademark on May 23". Currently, the "Yukkuri-Chaban-Theater" trademark is not valid.

=== Other ===
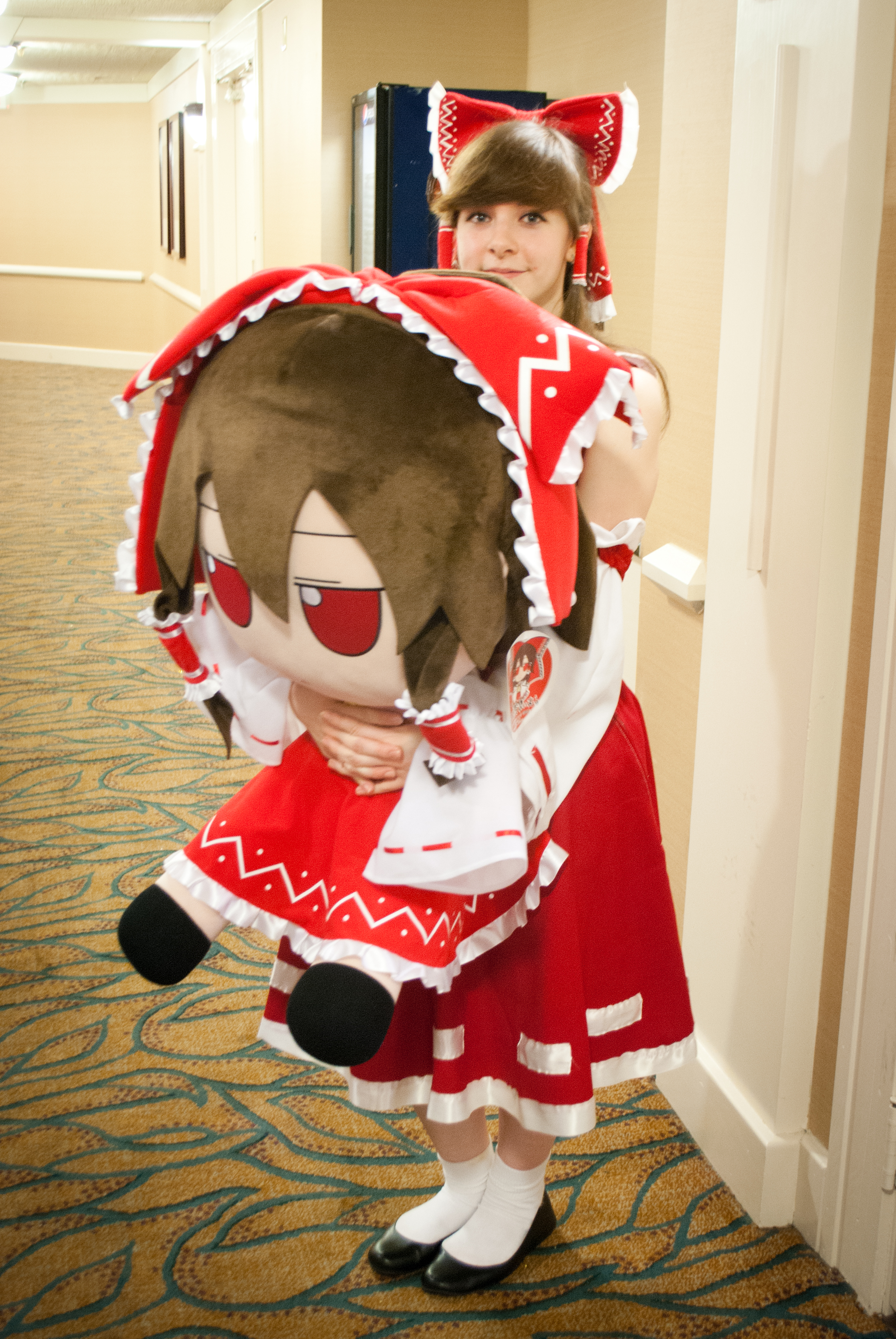
A Reimu cosplayer holding a Reimu DekaFumo

A popular internet meme is FumoFumo (ふもふも), referring to a line of plush dolls of characters from Touhou Project, which are designed by the Japanese illustrator Neji and manufactured by the Japanese merchandise company Gift. The plush series features emotionless faces, scornful eyes, and the standard size is about two heads tall. After becoming popular, the dolls have since caused panic buying.

In 2017, a crape myrtle cultivar, Lagerstroemia indica 'Lingmeng' (Chinese: 灵梦) was bred by Beijing Forestry University students and named after Reimu for its similarities to her outfit.
