= Twilight Frontier =

Video game developer

- Trade name: Tasofro
- Native name

Japanese name
- Kanji: 黄昏フロンティア
- Industry: Video game development
- Website: tasofro.net

Twilight Frontier (黄昏フロンティア, Tasogare Furontia), known as Tasofro for short, is a Japanese doujin game developer. They are best known for their collaborations with Team Shanghai Alice (a one-person circle run by ZUN), which include seven official games in the Touhou Project series.

== Productions ==
=== Games ===
Title	Genre	System	Release date	Note(s)	Ref(s)
Eternal Fighter Zero (-RENEWAL-, Blue Sky Edition, Bad Moon Edition, -MEMORIAL-)	Fighting	Windows	August 11, 2000 (Comiket 58)	A fighting game featuring characters from Moon, One, Kanon, and Air.	
Immaterial and Missing Power Tōhō Suimusō (東方萃夢想; lit. "Gathering Reverie")	Fighting	Windows	December 30, 2004 (Comiket 67)	1st Touhou Project fighting game; a collaboration with Team Shanghai Alice.	
Super Marisa Land Sūpā Marisa Rando (スーパーマリサランド)	Platform	Windows	May 4, 2005 (Reitaisai 2)	A clone of Super Mario World featuring Marisa Kirisame.	
MegaMari MegaMari – Marisa no Yabou (メガマリ – 魔理沙の野望; lit. Marisa's Ambition)	Platform	Windows	May 21, 2006 (Reitaisai 3)	A clone of Mega Man 2 featuring Marisa Kirisame.	
Higurashi Daybreak Higurashi Deibureiku (ひぐらしデイブレイク)	Third-person shooter	Windows	August 13, 2006 (Comiket 70)	Based on the visual novel Higurashi When They Cry by 07th Expansion. An expansion, Higurashi Daybreak Kai, was released on April 22, 2007.	
PatchCon! Pachukon! (ぱちゅコン! – Defend the library!)	Real-time strategy	Windows	December 31, 2007 (Comiket 73)	A real-time strategy game featuring Patchouli Knowledge.	
Scarlet Weather Rhapsody Tōhō Hisōten (東方緋想天; lit. "Scarlet Perception Heaven")	Fighting	Windows	May 25, 2008 (Reitaisai 5)	2nd Touhou Project fighting game; a collaboration with Team Shanghai Alice.	
Touhou Hisoutensoku Tōhō Hisōtensoku ~ Chōdokyū Ginyoru no Nazo o Oe (東方非想天則 〜 超弩級ギニョルの謎を追え; lit. "Unperceiving of Natural Law ~ Chase the Enigma of the Gargantuan Guignol")	Fighting	Windows	August 15, 2009 (Comiket 76)	3rd Touhou Project fighting game; a collaboration with Team Shanghai Alice.	
New Super Marisa Land Marisa to Muttsu no Kinoko (魔理沙と6つのキノコ; lit. "Marisa and the Six Mushrooms")	Platform	Windows	August 14, 2010 (Comiket 78)	A sequel to Super Marisa Land.	
DynaMarisa 3D Daina Marisa 3D (ダイナマリサ3D)	Third-person shooter	Windows	May 1, 2011 (Comic 1☆5)	A parody of Earth Defense Force 2017 featuring Marisa Kirisame.	
Grief Syndrome Gurīfu Shindorōmu (グリーフシンドローム)	Platform	Windows	August 12, 2011 (Comiket 80)	A side-scrolling game based on the anime Puella Magi Madoka Magica.	
Komeiji Satori no Jousou Kyouiku (古明地さとりの情操教育; lit. "Satori Komeiji's Mental Education")	Puzzle-platform	Windows	August 11, 2012 (Comiket 82)	An isometric game featuring Satori Komeiji.	
Hopeless Masquerade Tōhō Shinkirō (東方心綺楼; lit. "Heart Elegant Tower")	Fighting	Windows	May 26, 2013 (Reitaisai 10)	4th Touhou Project fighting game; a collaboration with Team Shanghai Alice.	
Shoot Shoot Nitori Shūshū Nito (収集荷取; lit. "Collecting Goods")	Shoot 'em up	Windows	May 11, 2014 (Reitaisai 11)	A side-scrolling danmaku featuring Nitori Kawashiro.	
Urban Legend in Limbo Tōhō Shinpiroku (東方深秘録; lit. "Deep Secret Record")	Fighting	Windows	May 10, 2015 (Reitaisai 12)	5th Touhou Project fighting game; a collaboration with Team Shanghai Alice.	
Urban Legend in Limbo Tōhō Shinpiroku (東方深秘録; lit. "Deep Secret Record")	Fighting	PlayStation 4	JP: December 8, 2016	5th Touhou Project fighting game; a collaboration with Team Shanghai Alice.	
Shoot Shoot Nitori: The Golden Shūshū Nito – Kin (収集荷取・金; lit. "Collecting Goods – Gold")	Shoot 'em up	Windows	December 30, 2015 (Comiket 89)	A sequel to Shoot Shoot Nitori.	
Antinomy of Common Flowers Tōhō Hyōibana (東方憑依華; lit. "Spirit Possession Bloom")	Fighting	Windows	December 29, 2017 (Comiket 93)	6th Touhou Project fighting game; a collaboration with Team Shanghai Alice.	
Antinomy of Common Flowers Tōhō Hyōibana (東方憑依華; lit. "Spirit Possession Bloom")	Fighting	PlayStation 4	April 22, 2021	6th Touhou Project fighting game; a collaboration with Team Shanghai Alice.	
Antinomy of Common Flowers Tōhō Hyōibana (東方憑依華; lit. "Spirit Possession Bloom")	Fighting	Nintendo Switch	April 22, 2021	6th Touhou Project fighting game; a collaboration with Team Shanghai Alice.	
MarisaLand Legacy Marisarando Regashi (マリサランド・レガシィ)	Platform	Windows	October 14, 2018 (Autumn Reitaisai 5)	A remake of Super Marisa Land.	
Sunken Fossil World Tōhō Gōyoku Ibun ~ Suibotsushita Chinshū Jigoku (東方剛欲異聞 〜 水没した沈愁地獄; lit. "Strange Tale of Avarice ~ Submerged Hell of Sunken Sorrow")	Bullet hell-platform	Windows	October 24, 2021	1st Touhou Project platform game; a collaboration with Team Shanghai Alice.	
Sunken Fossil World Tōhō Gōyoku Ibun ~ Suibotsushita Chinshū Jigoku (東方剛欲異聞 〜 水没した沈愁地獄; lit. "Strange Tale of Avarice ~ Submerged Hell of Sunken Sorrow")	Bullet hell-platform	Nintendo Switch	October 20, 2022	1st Touhou Project platform game; a collaboration with Team Shanghai Alice.	

=== Music CDs ===
- Higurashi Daybreak OST (ひぐらしデイブレイク OST; 2004-04-22)
- New Super Marisa Land OST (魔理沙と6つのキノコ OST; lit. "Marisa and Six Mushrooms OST"; 2010-12-30)

==== Collaborations with Team Shanghai Alice ====
- Immaterial and Missing Power OST (幻想曲抜萃, Gensōkyoku Bassui; lit. "Collection of Illusionary Music"; 2005-08-14)
- Scarlet Weather Rhapsody OST (全人類ノ天楽録, Zenjinrui no Tengakuroku Tōhō Hisōten; lit. "Celestial Music Record of All Humankind"; 2008-08-16)
- Touhou Hisoutensoku OST (核熱造神ヒソウテンソク, Kakunetsuzōshin Hisōtensoku; lit. "Thermonuclear Titan Hisoutensoku"; 2009-12-30)
- Hopeless Masquerade OST (暗黒能楽集・心綺楼, Ankoku Nōgakushū; lit. "Dark Noh Collection"; 2013-08-12)
- Urban Legend in Limbo OST (深秘的楽曲集 宇佐見菫子と秘密の部室, Shinpiteki Gakkyokushū ~ Usami Sumireko to Himitsu no Bushitsu; lit. "A Deeply Mystic Music Collection ~ Sumireko Usami and the Clubroom of Secrets"; 2015-08-14)
- Urban Legend in Limbo OST 2 (深秘的楽曲集・補 東方深秘録初回特典CD, Shinpiteki Gakkyokushū – Ho ~ Tōhō Shinpiroku Shokai Tokuten CD; lit. "A Deeply Mystic Music Collection Supplement ~ Touhou Shinpiroku First Pressing Special CD"; 2016-12-08)
- Antimony of Common Flowers OST (完全憑依ディスコグラフィ, Kanzenhyōi Disukogurafi; lit. "Perfect Possession Discography"; 2018-05-06)

== Main members ==
- Unabara Iruka (海原海豚) — General Producer/Character Graphics/System Graphics/Script/Sound Effects
- Nono Tarō (ののたろう) — Chief Programmer
- KuMa — Assistant Programmer
- alphes — Character Graphics
- Specter (スペクター) — Character Graphics
- Hasegawa Iwashi (長谷川イワシ) — Character Graphics, Background Graphics
- GOME — Character Graphics
- JUN — Sound Effects
- Uni Akiyama (あきやまうに) a.k.a. U2 — Music
- NKZ — Music
