= Touhou Spell Bubble =

2020 video game

- Developer: Taito
- Publisher: Taito: AS: Arc System Works
- Director: Mayu Kikuchi
- Producer: Tomoyuki Sawada
- Designer: Hidetake Iyomasa
- Composer: Yu Shimoda
- Series: Touhou Project; Puzzle Bobble
- Platform: Nintendo Switch
- Release: JP: February 6, 2020; AS: October 15, 2020; WW: October 29, 2020
- Genres: Puzzle, rhythm
- Modes: Single-player, multiplayer

Touhou Spell Bubble (Note: Japanese: 東方スペルバブル) is a rhythm based competitive arcade puzzle game developed and published by Taito as an officially licensed spin-off in the Touhou Project series. The gameplay is similar to that of the Puzzle Bobble series, which Taito also developed.

== Gameplay ==
Example of a match between Reimu and Marisa. Marisa is currently in the rhythm microgame that, once finished, will put further pressure on the panicking Reimu.

In Touhou Spell Bubble, the player is given colored bubbles, which they fire from the bottom of the screen onto a pile towards the top. The rate at which the player can fire bubbles corresponds to the tempo of the music. When three bubbles of the same color are connected, they pop, giving the player points. If a large enough group is destroyed, a rhythm microgame will initiate, requiring the player to rhythmically press the button to the song's timeline (seen on both far left and right) to receive further points and send colorless junk bubbles to the opponent.

Touhou Spell Bubble features a story mode told from either Reimu and Marisa's perspectives, both containing 22 levels each. Using visual novel-styled cutscenes and gameplay, it tells the tale of Marisa's newly developed, magically charged game "Spell Bubble" and the ongoing mysteries regarding the upcoming tournament surrounding it.

Characters can be unlocked in story mode, totalling at 20 playable characters upon completion, each of whom has a total of 3 spell cards to choose from, which can be used to destroy bubbles, or impede her opponent's ability to do the same. Matches last for the runtime of the background music, and the player with the most points when the time runs out is declared the winner. The player can also play singular matches, either with the AI, or with human opponents through local or online multiplayer. Upon winning or losing matches, the player is given in-game currency based on the overall skill intensity between the opponents of the match, which can be used to purchase new songs and spell cards.

== Development ==
On 23 January 2020, Taito released a gameplay trailer for Touhou Spell Bubble on their YouTube channel, and announced the game's release date. The game was released in Japan through the Nintendo eShop on February 6, 2020, and internationally on October 29. Physical copies were released in Asia in autumn 2020. The company has referred to the game as "Puzzle Bobble meets Touhou Project."

The music of Touhou Spell Bubble was used in promotional material, with Taito releasing the names of composers in January 2020. The game features doujin songs including "Bad Apple!!", "Marisa Stole the Precious Thing", "Night of Knights", and "Cirno's Perfect Math Class".

In November 2020, three separate music packs were released as DLC, and side story content was released in DLC exclusive to Japan. In November 2021, online multiplayer was added to the game in a free update.

== Reception ==
Reception

Aggregate score
Aggregator	Score
Metacritic	77/100

Review scores
Publication	Score
Nintendo Life	8/10
Cubed3	8/10
Digitally Downloaded	3/5
Nintendo Blast	8.5/10
Siliconera	8/10

Touhou Spell Bubble received "generally favorable reviews", according to review aggregator Metacritic. Nintendo Life's Pete Davison commended the gameplay, music, and artwork, but criticised the lack of an online multiplayer. Digitally Downloaded's Harvard L. was more critical, stating that "the elegant simplicity of Puzzle Bobble was being tainted", resulting in "a game about instincts rather than planning". He considered both the story and gameplay too difficult to understand, and argued that it was inferior to the original Puzzle Bobble. Siliconera's Jenni Lada gave positive remarks to the "unbelievably satisfying" gameplay, and "amazing" music. Lada later went on to call it one of the best games of 2020.

Nintendo Blast's Juliana Paiva Zapparoli criticized the high retail price due to the use of licensed music and translation issues, stating that the title was better suited for fans of Touhou Project. Nevertheless, Zapparoli gave positive remarks for the gameplay, replay value, game modes, responsive controls, adjustable difficulty, music selection and for being faithful to the source material. Cubed3's Shane Jury felt that the game stands above most puzzle titles on Nintendo Switch for its "brilliant audio collection" and unique take on the Puzzle Bobble system, but criticized the lack of online multiplayer. Touch Arcade's Shaun Musgrave called Touhou Spell Bubble one of the 10 best puzzle games available on Switch, but noted "the only thing it's missing is an online multiplayer mode, and that is admittedly a big omission given what a blast the local multiplayer mode is."

== See also ==
- List of Touhou Project fangames
