= Gensou SkyDrift =

2019 video game

- Developer: illuCalab
- Publishers: Sony Music Entertainment Japan; Unties (NS); Phoenixx (PS4)
- Series: Touhou Project fangame
- Platforms: Microsoft Windows, Nintendo Switch, PlayStation 4
- Release: WW: December 12, 2019 (WIN/NS); WW: March 9, 2021 (PS4)
- Genre: Racing
- Modes: Single-player, multiplayer

Gensou SkyDrift (Note: Japanese: 幻走スカイドリフト, Hepburn: Gensō SukaiDorifuto) is a racing Touhou Project fangame developed in 2019 by illuCalab for Microsoft Windows and Nintendo Switch, by a development team who had previously worked on Mario Kart 8. In 2021, it was released for PlayStation 4.

== Gameplay ==
Sakuya riding Remilia.

In Gensou SkyDrift, the player will control two characters simultaneously, one who acts as the rider, and the other as the board. The player has a 'power' bar, which permanently increases as their team goes, but can be increased faster by passing colored rings on the course. When the bar is full, the player can have the two characters switch places, giving them a speed boost in the process. Additionally, when the bar is filled, the player will receive one of several possible power-ups, such as deploying obstacles on the track, or a temporary increase in speed.

Gensou SkyDrift has a story mode, in which the player can unlock new characters and tracks by completing races. The player may race in single player against the AI, or in multiplayer, either online or through local split-screen. The Steam and Switch versions are cross-compatible.

== Development ==
Gensou SkyDrift was announced in November 2019, and released on December 12 for Steam and Nintendo Switch. The PlayStation 4 version was planned to be released within the first quarter of 2020, however, due to delays, the game wasn't released for PS4 until March 9, 2021. The PS4 version is backwards compatible with the PS5.

== Reception ==
Reception

Aggregate score
Aggregator	Score
Metacritic	(PS4) 48/100

Review scores
Publication	Score
Famitsu	(NS) 29/40
Nintendo Life	(NS) 6/10
Nintendo World Report	(NS) 6/10
Cubed3	(PC) 6/10
Oprainfall	(NS) 4/5
Pure PlayStation	(PS4) 3/10
Third Coast Review	(PS4) 2/4

Gensou SkyDrift received "generally unfavorable reviews" on PlayStation 4, according to review aggregator Metacritic. Reviewers noted the absence of online players, and criticised the outdated graphics, and poor controls, which could not be remapped. However, they noted that having the player control two characters at once added depth to the gameplay. Nintendo World Report's Neal Ronaghan commended the Mario Kart: Double Dash-inspired gameplay mechanics and multiplayer component but criticized Gensou SkyDrift for its dated feel and design, as well as the lackluster single-player campaign. Nintendo Life's Chris Scullion regarded it as "one of the better non-Mario karting games on the Switch", giving particular praise to the title's drift mechanic, but criticised the tracks for being "frustrating", alongside a lack of single-player content, and a lack of players for the online mode – "at the time of writing the game is only a week old and the online is already as dead as Manchester United's league title hopes, so you may as well just assume there's no online at all." Oprainfall's Steve Baltimore praised Gensou SkyDrift for its visual style and artwork despite not being graphically intense, sense of speed, soundtrack and straightforward gameplay but noted the lack of voice acting and additional game modes.

Famitsu's four reviewers felt that the tag team mechanic added an element of real-time strategy into the gameplay, which was also criticized for not being easy to understand, but they commended the game for its sense of speed and Japanese-style 3D "roller coaster" courses. Cubed3's Eric Ace felt that it was a competent and well done racing title, stating that "it handles/plays better than Mario Kart 8", which he felt was slow and clunky. However, Ace criticized its lack of depth and content, as well as the short length. Pure PlayStation's Chris Harding heavily panned several aspects such as the bland visuals, gameplay, poor track designs and power-up items, lack of content and lack of players in the online multiplayer mode, though he noted that the character handling was decent. Third Coast Review's Dan Santaromita criticized its visuals for being blocky, control scheme and poor draw distance that hindered playability, though he commended the Double Dash-esque changing mechanic for adding depth to the gameplay. Santaromita compared the game with Nickelodeon Kart Racers 2: Grand Prix due to being "solid driving" licensed titles.

== See also ==
- List of Touhou Project fangames
