= Scarlet Weather Rhapsody =

2008 video game

- Developers: Twilight Frontier; Team Shanghai Alice
- Publisher: Twilight Frontier
- Series: Touhou Project
- Platform: Microsoft Windows
- Release: May 25, 2008
- Genre: Fighting
- Modes: Single-player, multiplayer

Touhou Hisouten ~ Scarlet Weather Rhapsody. (Japanese: 東方緋想天 〜 Scarlet Weather Rhapsody.; lit. "Eastern Skies of Scarlet Perceptions") is the second versus fighting game in the Touhou Project, and is the spiritual successor to Immaterial and Missing Power by Twilight Frontier and Team Shanghai Alice. In the Touhou Project overall, it is labelled as the 10.5th Touhou game, though the game was first planned to be numbered 9.8. In western gaming communities, Scarlet Weather Rhapsody is often abbreviated as SWR.

== Gameplay ==
Scarlet Weather Rhapsody stayed true to its predecessor Immaterial and Missing Power in that it retained most of the Immaterial's basic system and moves. Projectiles are still the main attack feature, and grazing is still an effective way of evasion. In addition, Scarlet Weather Rhapsody added the ability to fly, a different card deck system, and a weather system that deals out various handicaps.

Scarlet Weather Rhapsody also provides built-in support for multiplayer games over the internet, something that its predecessor lacks.

In-game screenshot showing Aya activating a spellcard

=== Card deck system ===
Expanded from the Spell Card system of Immaterial and other games, Scarlet Weather Rhapsody allows the player to assemble a "deck" of 20 cards. Cards become available for in-play use as the player deals or receives damage. New cards can be obtained through various actions in gameplay (such as defeating an opponent).

Cards fall into three categories: System Cards, Skill Cards, and Spell Cards. System Cards include bombs (like in Immaterial, knocks the enemy back), weather change, and other miscellaneous options. Skill Cards upgrade special attacks to do more damage, allow the player to gain alternate special attacks, or both. Spell Cards are powerful attacks that automatically work once activated. Proper assembly of card decks according to the player's style is key to mastering the game, since the decks limit what the characters can do during a match.

=== Weather ===
The weather changes during a match, which subjects the two combatants to some handicap according to the weather, as listed below. Note that although there are weather changes in the Story Mode, they are for visual effects only and do not carry any handicap like in other modes.

| Weather | Associated with | Effect |
|---|---|---|
| Temperament 気質 | N/A | No effect until the timer reaches 100. |
| Sunny 快晴 | Reimu Hakurei | Border Escapes are free, flight cost is halved. |
| Drizzle 霧雨 | Marisa Kirisame | Spell card damages increase. |
| Cloudy 曇天 | Sakuya Izayoi | Decreases spell card cost by 1. |
| Azure Sky 蒼天 | Youmu Konpaku | Special attacks can be canceled into other special attacks. |
| Hail 雹 | Alice Margatroid | Spirit Orb Recovery speed is doubled, increases damage of bullet-type specials. |
| Spring Haze 花曇 | Patchouli Knowledge | Players cannot use any melee attacks, though Special melee moves still can be used. The delay in spirit recharging after an attack is removed as well. |
| Dense Fog 濃霧 | Remilia Scarlet | Inflicting damage on an opponent restores a small bit of health to the player. |
| Snow 雪 | Yuyuko Saigyouji | Hitting an opponent will cause her to lose some of her card gauge. Cards lost this way are returned to the player's deck. |
| Sunshowers 天気雨 | Yukari Yakumo | Incorrectly blocked melee attacks result in an instant guard crush. |
| Sprinkle 疎雨 | Suika Ibuki | All special moves and Skillcard moves are upgraded to Level 4. |
| Tempest 風雨 | Aya Syameimaru | Maximum Airdashes/Flys allowed increased by one, characters can high jump cancel their melee attacks. |
| Mountain Vapor 晴嵐 | Reisen Udongein Inaba | Spellcards in reserve are hidden with a "?" |
| River Mist 川霧 | Komachi Onoduka | Normalizes the distance between opponents. |
| Typhoon 台風 | Iku Nagae | Characters gain superarmor and will not enter hitstun, and also lose the ability to block. |
| Aurora 極光 | Tenshi Hinanai | Cause a random weather effect. |
| Scarlet Weather Rhapsody 緋想天 | Tenshi Hinanai | Story Mode only. No effect. |

== Plot ==
Unlike previous Touhou games where the multiple endings are numbered, leading to ambiguous canonicity of each ending, Scarlet Weather Rhapsody does not number its endings and all story routes are considered as canon. This is achieved by placing all story routes in different places in the plot's continuity, though the chronological order in which the characters' stories are played out is not immediately apparent to the player.

A bizarre phenomenon is occurring in Gensokyo. In the middle of summer, untimely rain and hail fall in the Forest of Magic, snow blankets Hakugyokurou, the Scarlet Devil Mansion is enveloped in a cloudy, dense haze, and the Hakurei Shrine is levelled by a sudden earthquake. Throughout the game, Reimu and the other protagonists set out to investigate the source of the strange occurrences.

The culprit behind all these is the celestial Tenshi Hinanai. Finding her newfound life in Heaven boring and monotonous, she enviously saw the youkai of Gensokyo stirring many incidents from above. Wielding the power to control the earth and the divine Sword of Scarlet Thought (緋想の剣, Hisō no Tsurugi), the jaded celestial decides to instigate a catastrophe of her own.

== Characters ==
Scarlet Weather Rhapsody retained all characters from Immaterial and Missing Power (except Hong Meirin) while adding three pre-existing characters of the Touhou Project into the game and introducing two new characters— bringing the total roster to 15 characters.

The character selection screen. Tenshi (left) and Marisa (right). In the middle, from left to right, are: 1st row - Reimu, Sakuya, Youmu, Marisa 2nd row - Alice, Remilia, Yuyuko, Patchouli 3rd row - Yukari, Reisen, Aya, Suika 4th row - Komachi, Iku, Tenshi

- Reimu Hakurei (博麗霊夢) - The miko of the Hakurei Shrine, which was newly reduced to rubble. She sets out to find the one responsible for this and make her compensate for the shrine.
- Marisa Kirisame (霧雨魔理沙) - A magician living in the Forest of Magic. Troubled by the rain around her, Marisa tries to go to a place where the rain won't reach her.
- Sakuya Izayoi (十六夜咲夜) - The head maid of the Scarlet Devil Mansion, noticing the energy flowing out of her body, she decides to find the cause.
- Youmu Konpaku (魂魄妖夢) - The gardener of Hakugyokurou. Noticing that ghosts were decreasing in number, she goes to investigate without telling her mistress Yuyuko.
- Alice Margatroid (アリス・マーガトロイド) - A puppeteer magician who also lives in the Forest of Magic. Convinced that the strange occurrences are signs of an impending earthquake, she delves further in the matter.
- Patchouli Knowledge (パチュリー・ノーレッジ) - The resident bookworm of the Scarlet Devil Mansion, she feels the change in the temperaments and puts the investigation upon herself since no one else seemed to realize what was happening.
- Remilia Scarlet (レミリア・スカーレット) - The vampire lady of the Scarlet Devil Mansion. Remilia has to stay indoors because rain, one of vampires' weaknesses, kept falling outside the mansion. Being bored, she had her servant maid Sakuya bring in suspects of the incident one by one.
- Yuyuko Saigyouji (西行寺幽々子) - The mistress of Hakugyokurou. Although she was one of the earliest to realize the change in temperaments, she did not seek to put an end to the incident but used it to further her own ends - to enjoy a cool summer.
- Yukari Yakumo (八雲紫) - A youkai who looks over borders, including the one at the Hakurei Shrine. Infuriated by Tenshi's plan to make the shrine celestial property, she seeks Tenshi out and destroys the newly rebuilt Hakurei Shrine.
- Suika Ibuki (伊吹萃香) - A party-loving oni who felt the temperaments were being gathered. Thinking the whole venture fun, she went up to Heaven to help turn Tenshi's prank into something more serious and to stay for the food and drink.
- Aya Syameimaru (射命丸文) - A newspaper journalist for the tengu society of the mountain. While not searching for potential scoops, she guards the mountain from trespassers.
- Reisen Udongein Inaba (鈴仙・優曇華院・イナバ) - A moon rabbit who now resides in Eientei. By the orders of her master Eirin Yagokoro, she goes around warning people for earthquakes and investigates the aftermath.
- Komachi Onozuka (小野塚小町) - The shinigami in charge of bringing souls to the other side. Now just wandering around and slacking off.
- Iku Nagae (永江衣玖) - An oarfish (known as "messenger of the Dragon Palace" literally in Japanese) whose task is to take notice of earthquake signs and warn the people of the inevitable disaster. Nominally under the command of the celestials.
- Tenshi Hinanai (比那名居天子) - A celestial who ascended to Heaven through no virtue of her own. The tempering of the temperaments and instigating earthquakes were all her doing, due to her being bored and wanting people to "defeat" her.

== Development ==
Like with Immaterial and Missing Power, ZUN of Team Shanghai Alice only did parts of the game while Twilight Frontier did most of the game-making. ZUN, besides overseeing the whole development, also provided the storyline, new character designs, spell card names, and three new music tracks for the game.

The public was first given a hands-on trial of the beta version of the game in the fourth Reitaisai in 2007. Though eight laptops were set up for the game, it reportedly took over an hour of waiting in line before one could have a try at the game. A trial version was sold at the Comiket 72 on August 17 of the same year for 100 yen, and a new demo was offered for free download on the Twilight Frontier's website on April 29, 2008. The full version was released at the fifth Reitaisai on May 25, 2008.

Unlike the main line of Touhou games where the character artwork is drawn by ZUN, the dialog character sprites and ending artwork in Scarlet Weather Rhapsody are drawn by alphes from the Twilight Frontier team, as is the case with Immaterial and Missing Power.

== Merchandise ==
The soundtrack of the game was compiled into an album named Zenjinrui no Tenrakuroku (全人類ノ天楽録), first sold in Comiket 74 on August 16, 2008. As was the case in Immaterial and Missing Power, half of the songs were remixes of existing Touhou songs.

Twilight Frontier also made "Hisouten Furoku ~Weatherlight~" (緋想天符録 ～WEATHER LIGHT～), turning in-game cards into paper, first sold in the COMIC1☆3 convention on April 26, 2009. Each deck contains 15 cards, one spellcard for each character, all redesigned and re-illustrated by alphes, the artist of Scarlet Weather Rhapsody. The cards are meant to be for collection only; there is no card game associated with these cards.
