= List of Higurashi When They Cry soundtracks =

This article lists the soundtracks to the Japanese visual novel and anime series Higurashi When They Cry.

== Visual novels ==
=== PC ===
==== Thanks/you ====
Thanks/you

Soundtrack album by dai
- Released: August 2005
- Genre: Video game soundtrack
- Length: 54:21
- Label: M.Graveyard

Thanks/you is a music album composed by Japanese dōjin music artist, dai, for use in the "answer" arcs to the visual novel Higurashi no Naku Koro ni. Unofficially, fans had originally referred to this as the original soundtrack, even though it does not have all the scores that were used in the game.

Track listing

1. "Thanks"
2. "Iru"
3. "Kage" (陰, Shadow)
4. "Soul scour"
5. "you" (M.Box Style) (you (M.Box風))
6. "Confession"
7. "you"
8. "Sorayume" (空夢)
9. "Sora no Mukō" (そらのむこう)
10. "Kyōsō" (競争)
11. "Tsukikage" (arrange) (月影)
12. "Musō" (夢想)
13. "Musō" (arrange) (夢想)
14. "feel"
15. "Tsukikage" (月影)
16. "Kuon" (久遠)
17. "Birth and Death"
18. "Omoi" (想い)
19. "you" (Vocal)
20. "Omoi" (Vocal) (想い)

Production staff

- Composer: dai
- Vocals: Yuzuki
- Lyrics: Yuki, Yuzuki
- Cover illustrator: capital of sea

==== Higurashi no Naku Koro ni Kai Original Soundtrack ====
Higurashi no Naku Koro ni Kai Original Soundtrack

Soundtrack album
- Released: August 23, 2006
- Genre: Video game soundtrack
- Label: Lantis

The Higurashi no Naku Koro ni Kai Original Soundtrack (ひぐらしのなく頃に 解 オリジナルサウンドトラック, Higurashi no Naku Koro ni Kai Orijinaru Saundotorakku) for the visual novels playable on the PC was first released by Lantis on August 23, 2006.

Track listing

===== CD 1 =====
1. "air pizz"
2. "Testament"
3. "Festival" (祭, Matsuri)
4. "feel"
5. "you" (M.Box)
6. "Fabricated Dream" (空夢, Sorayume)
7. "Soul scour"
8. "Shadow" (陰, Kage)
9. "Fearlessness"
10. "you – destructive"
11. "C-examination"
12. "search and destroy"
13. "Hollow" (虚, Uro)
14. "Party" (宴, Utage)
15. "being"
16. "Birth and death"
17. "confession"
18. "conviction"
19. "Iru"
20. "Single" (一重, Hitoe)
21. "Cradle song"
22. "Gray"
23. "years"
24. "LIVE"
25. "Thanks"
26. "Two People. One Person." (ふたり。ひとり。, Futari. Hitori.)
27. "Beyond the Sky" (piano) (そらのむこう, Sora no Mukō)
28. "you"

===== CD 2 =====
1. "Festivals" (祝祭, Shukusai)
2. "utu"
3. "Frozen memories"
4. "Solitude"
5. "door"
6. "Liberating"
7. "Over the sky"
8. "Rain"
9. "Squall"
10. "Throbbing" (鼓動, Kodō)
11. "Formenting" (胎動, Taidō)
12. "daily passing by"
13. "daily passing by" (celesta)
14. "soak"
15. "what is wished"
16. "Amber"
17. "Bellflower"
18. "Big Bear"
19. "A Gallery of Madness" (狂気への回廊, Kyōki e no Kairō)
20. "Unseen Future" (見えぬ未来, Mienu Mirai)
21. "pros"
22. "Sheep counts"
23. "The Boy of the Windmill Shed" (風車小屋の少年, Fūshagoya no Shōnen)
24. "Ancient Times" (古, Inishie)
25. "Things I Want to Convey" (伝えたいこと, Tsutaetai Koto)
26. "Beyond the Sky" (Vocal) (そらのむこう, Sora no Mukō)

==== Higurashi Daybreak Original Soundtrack ====
Higurashi Daybreak Original Soundtrack

Soundtrack album by dai, Akiyama Uni, Tabiuta
- Released: April 22, 2007
- Genre: Video game soundtrack
- Label: Twilight Frontier

The Higurashi Daybreak Original Soundtrack (ひぐらしデイブレイク Original Sound Track) for the derivative game Higurashi Daybreak was released by the game's developers Twilight Frontier on April 22, 2007, in the thirty-fifth Sunshine Creation convention. Although a soundtrack for Higurashi Daybreak, it includes tracks only featured in the fandisc Higurashi no Naku Koro ni Rei and the demos of the original games. A forty-page short story "Higurashi Outbreak", written by Ryukishi07, was included in the CD jacket.

Track listing

===== CD 1 =====
1. "from the sky"
2. "today's hero"
3. "2 on 2"
4. "close mission"
5. "prize machine"
6. "far east"
7. "elastico"
8. "just cause"
9. "thanks"
10. "speedster"
11. "sacred curry empire"
12. "antiguo"
13. "dernier"
14. "camouflage legend"
15. "fearlessness"
16. "night chaser"
17. "victory"
18. "defeat"
19. "to the sky"

===== CD 2 =====
1. "User's Manual" (取扱説明書, Toriatsukai Setsumeisho)
2. "Now Clubbing" (只今部活中, Tadaima Bukatsu Chū)
3. "Classroom at the Evening" (夕方の教室, Yūgata no Kyōshitsu)
4. "Wrong Color" (色違い, Iro chigai)
5. "Beautiful World" (美しき世界, Utsukushiki Sekai)
6. "Way Back" (帰路, Kiro)
7. "Motemichi Kaku Katari ki" (モテ道かく語りき)
8. "The Rise and Fall of an Empire" (帝国の興亡, Teikoku no Kōbō)
9. "Magatama of Fuwarazu" (フワラズノ勾玉, Fuwarazu no Magatama)
10. "To the Future" (未来へ, Mirai e)
11. "Nipa~☆" (にぱ～☆)
12. "kneecap"
13. "bright sun"
14. "spinning seesaw"
15. "close mission" (Arrange)
16. "far east" (Arrange)
17. "elastico" (Arrange)
18. "night chaser" (Arrange)
19. "to the sky" (Arrange)
20. "Magatama of Fuwarazu" (Arrange) (フワラズノ勾玉, Fuwarazu no Magatama)

=== PlayStation 2 ===
==== Nageki no Mori ====
"Nageki no Mori"

Single by Ayane
- Released: February 22, 2007
- Genre: Video game soundtrack
- Length: 20:34
- Label: Geneon
- Composer: not stated

Nageki no Mori (嘆きノ森) is a single by Ayane. The song "Nageki no Mori" was used as the opening theme to the PlayStation 2 version of Higurashi no Naku Koro ni entitled Higurashi no Naku Koro ni Matsuri, while "Complex Image" was used as the opening theme to the Miotsukushi-hen on the same game. It was released the same day as the ending theme song single on February 22, 2007, by Geneon.

Track listing

1. "Nageki no Mori" (嘆きノ森) – 5:18
2. "Complex Image" (コンプレックス・イマージュ) – 4:59
3. "Nageki no Mori" (off vocal) (嘆きノ森) – 5:18
4. "Complex Image" (off vocal) (コンプレックス・イマージュ) – 4:59

==== Escape ====
"Escape"

Single by Kanako Itō
- Released: February 22, 2007
- Genre: Video game soundtrack
- Label: Geneon
- Composer: Not stated

Escape is a single by Kanako Itō. The song "Escape" was used as the ending theme to the Tsumihoroboshi-hen on the PlayStation 2 version of Higurashi no Naku Koro ni entitled Higurashi no Naku Koro ni Matsuri, while "Friend" was used as the ending theme to the Miotsukushi-hen on the same game. It was released the same day as the opening theme song single on February 22, 2007, by Geneon.

Track listing

1. "Escape"
2. "Friend"
3. "Escape" (off vocal)
4. "Friend" (off vocal)

=== Nintendo DS ===
==== Tsuisō no Despair ====
"Tsuisō no Despair"

Single by Kanako Itō
- Released: June 26, 2008
- Genre: Video game soundtrack
- Length: 19:15
- Label: 5pb.
- Composer: Not stated

Tsuisō no Despair (追想のディスペア, Tsuisō no Disupea; Despair of Recollections) is a single by Kanako Itō. The song "Tsuisō no Despair" was used as the opening theme song to the first volume of the Nintendo DS version of Higurashi no Naku Koro ni entitled Higurashi no Naku Koro ni Kizuna: Tatari. It was released on the same day as the game was released, on June 26, 2008, by 5pb..

Track listing

1. "Despair of Recollections" (追想のディスペア, Tsuisō no Disupea)
2. "Gust" (突風, Toppū)
3. "Despair of Recollections" (off vocal) (追想のディスペア, Tsuisō no Disupea)
4. "Gust" (off vocal) (突風, Toppū)

==== Place of Period ====
"Place of Period"

Single by Mio Isayama
- Released: December 3, 2008
- Genre: Video game soundtrack
- Label: 5pb.
- Composer: Not stated

Place of Period (プレイス・オブ・ピリオド, Pureisu obu piriodo) is a single by Mio Isayama. The song "Place of Period" was used as the opening theme song to the second volume of the Nintendo DS version of Higurashi no Naku Koro ni entitled Higurashi no Naku Koro ni Kizuna: Sō. It was released on December 3, 2008, by 5pb..

Track listing

1. "Place of Period" (プレイス・オブ・ピリオド, Pureisu Obu Piriodo)
2. "A Half-hearted Love" (半分だけの愛, Hanbun Dake no Ai)
3. "Place of Period" (off vocal) (プレイス・オブ・ピリオド, Pureisu Obu Piriodo)
4. "A Half-hearted Love" (off vocal) (半分だけの愛, Hanbun Dake no Ai)

==== Hikari no Sora no Qualia ====
"Hikari no Sora no Qualia"

Single by Cyua
- Released: June 10, 2009
- Genre: Video game soundtrack
- Label: 5pb.
- Composer: Not stated

Hikari no Sora no Qualia (光の空のクオリア, Hikari no Sora no Kuoria; Qualia of the Shining Sky) is a single by Cyua. The song "Qualia of the Shining Sky" was used as the opening theme song to the third volume of the Nintendo DS version of Higurashi no Naku Koro ni entitled Higurashi no Naku Koro ni Kizuna: Rasen. It was released on June 10, 2009, by 5pb.. The second song on the single was sung by Velforest.

Track listing

1. "Qualia of the Shining Sky" (光の空のクオリア, Hikari no Sora no Kuoria)
2. "Black Altar" (漆黒の祭壇, Shikkoku no Saidan)
3. "Qualia of the Shining Sky" (off vocal) (光の空のクオリア, Hikari no Sora no Kuoria)
4. "Black Altar" (off vocal) (漆黒の祭壇, Shikkoku no Saidan)

==== Angelic Bright ====
"Angelic Bright"

Single by Ayane
- Released: March 10, 2010
- Genre: Video game soundtrack
- Label: 5pb.
- Composer: Not stated

Angelic Bright (エンジェリック・ブライト, Enjerikku buraito) is a single by Ayane. The song "Angelic Bright" was used as the opening theme song to the fourth volume of the Nintendo DS version of Higurashi no Naku Koro ni entitled Higurashi no Naku Koro ni Kizuna: Kizuna. It was released on March 10, 2010, by 5pb..

Track listing

1. "Angelic Bright" (エンジェリック・ブライト, Enjerikku buraito)
2. "Tada Nagaruru Mama ni" (ただ流るるままに, Tada nagareruru mama ni)
3. "Angelic Bright" (off vocal) (エンジェリック・ブライト, Enjerikku buraito)
4. "Tada Nagaruru Mama ni" (off vocal) (ただ流るるままに, Tada nagareruru mama ni)

== Anime ==
=== OP/ED themes ===
==== Higurashi no Naku Koro ni ====
"Higurashi no Naku Koro ni"

Single by Eiko Shimamiya
- B-side: "all alone"
- Released: May 24, 2006
- Genre: Anime soundtrack
- Length: 21:02
- Composer: Not stated

Higurashi no Naku Koro ni (ひぐらしのなく頃に) is the opening theme to the anime Higurashi no Naku Koro ni.

Track listing

1. "Higurashi no Naku Koro ni" (ひぐらしのなく頃に) – 4:27
  - Lyrics: Eiko Shimamiya
  - Music: Nakazawa Tomoyuki
  - Arrange: Nakazawa Tomoyuki & Takase Kazuya
  - Sung by: Eiko Shimamiya
2. "all alone" – 6:04
3. "Higurashi no Naku Koro ni" Instrumental (ひぐらしのなく頃に) – 4:27
4. "all alone" Instrumental – 6:04

==== Why, or Why Not ====
"Why, or Why Not"

Single by Hiroyuki Oshima feat. Rekka Katakiri
- Released: June 28, 2006
- Genre: Anime soundtrack
- Length: 22:22
- Composer: Not stated

Why, or Why Not is the ending theme for the anime Higurashi no Naku Koro ni.

Track listing

1. "Why, or Why Not" – 5:41
  - Lyrics: interface
  - Music/Arrange: Hiroyuki Oshima
  - Sung by: Rekka Katakiri
2. "Tasokare" (誰そ彼, lit. Dusk) – 5:30
3. "Why, or Why Not" Instrumental – 5:41
4. "Tasokare" Instrumental (誰そ彼, lit. Dusk) – 5:30

==== Naraku no Hana ====
"Naraku no Hana"

Single by Eiko Shimamiya
- Released: August 22, 2007
- Genre: Anime soundtrack
- Composer: Not stated

Naraku no Hana (奈落の花) is the opening theme single to the anime Higurashi no Naku Koro ni Kai. The single was released on August 22, 2007, and is sung by Eiko Shimamiya.

Track listing

1. "Naraku no Hana" (奈落の花)
2. "FLOW"
3. "Naraku no Hana" (off vocal) (奈落の花)
4. "FLOW" (off vocal)

==== Taishō a ====
"Taishō a"

Single by anNina
- Released: August 22, 2007
- Genre: Anime soundtrack
- Composer: Not stated

Taishō a (対象 a) is the ending theme single to the anime Higurashi no Naku Koro ni Kai. The single was released on August 22, 2007, and is sung by anNina.

Track listing

1. "Taishō a" (対象 a)
2. "Rothschild Rh-" (ロートシルトRh-, Rōtoshiruto Rh-)
3. "Taishō a" (off vocal) (対象 a)
4. "Rothschild Rh-" (off vocal) (ロートシルトRh-, Rōtoshiruto Rh-)

=== Original soundtracks ===
==== Higurashi no Naku Koro ni ====
===== Volume 1 =====
Higurashi no Naku Koro ni Original Soundtrack

Soundtrack album by Kenji Kawai
- Released: July 21, 2006
- Genre: Anime soundtrack
- Label: Frontier Works

Higurashi no Naku Koro ni Original Soundtrack is the first official soundtrack released for the series on July 21, 2006.

Track listing

1. "Main Theme" (メイン・テーマ, Mein Tēma)
2. "Quiet Morning" (静かな朝, Shizuka na Asa)
3. "Stroll" (散策, Sansaku)
4. "Suspicion" (疑惑, Giwaku)
5. "Curse" (祟り, Tatari)
6. "Smile" (笑顔, Egao)
7. "Let's Be Enthusiastic!" (ハリキって行こう!, Harikitte Ikō!)
8. "I've Decided!" (決めるぜ!, Kimeru Ze!)
9. "Oyashirosama" (オヤシロさま)
10. "Tranquility" (やすらぎ, Yasuragi)
11. "Submergence" (浸行, Shinkō)
12. "Hint" (暗示, Anji)
13. "Seal of Spirit!" (元気印!, Genkijirushi!)
14. "Girl" (少女, Shōjo)
15. "Backside" (ウラガワ, Uragawa)
16. "Crisis" (危機, Kiki)
17. "Plan" (企み, Takurami)
18. "After School" (放課後, Hōkago)
19. "Festival" (祭り, Matsuri)
20. "Story" (ものがたり, Monogatari)
21. "Event" (事件, Jiken)
22. "Onigafuchi" (鬼ヶ淵)
23. "Embracing Thoughts" (想い抱いて, Omoi Daite)
24. In Class! (授業中!, Jugyōchū!)
25. "Gracefully" (淑やかに, Shitoyaka ni)
26. "Match!" (勝負!, Shōbu!)
27. "Wile" (ワルだくみ, Warudakumi)
28. "Evening Cool" (夕涼み, Yūsuzumi)
29. "Dependence" (憑依, Hyōi)
30. "Darkening" (暗転, Anten)
31. "Terror" (恐怖, Kyōfu)
32. "Tension" (緊張, Kinchō)
33. "Painful" (切なくて, Setsunakute)
34. "Main Theme" ~revise~ (メイン・テーマ, Mein Tēma)
35. "Higurashi no Naku Koro ni" ~TV Version~ (ひぐらしのなく頃に, When Cicadas Cry)
36. "Why, or Why Not" ~TV Version~

===== Volume 2 =====
Higurashi no Naku Koro ni Original Soundtrack Vol. 2

Soundtrack album by Kenji Kawai
- Released: October 6, 2006
- Genre: Anime soundtrack
- Label: Frontier Works

Higurashi no Naku Koro ni Original Soundtrack Vol. 2 is the second official soundtrack released for the series on October 6, 2006.

Track listing

1. "Shade" (翳し, Kazashi)
2. "Dependence ~gamelan ver.~" (憑依 ～gamelan ver.～, Hyōi ~gamelan ver.~)
3. "Main Theme - Crime" (メイン･テマ - 罪, Mein Tema - Tsumi)
4. "Weird" (奇怪, Kikai)
5. "Obvious Time" (あたりまえの時間, Atarimae no Jikan)
6. "Fear of Earthquakes" (怖震, Oshin)
7. "Loose~." (ゆったり～。, Yuttari~.)
8. "Change" (変化, Henka)
9. "Survey" (調査, Chōsa)
10. "Close" (迫る, Semaru)
11. "Main Theme - Sad" (メイン･テマ - 哀, Mein Tema - Ai)
12. "Fate" (宿命, Shukumei)
13. "Rocking" (揺動, Yōdō)
14. "Smooth Water" (平穏無事, Heionbuji)
15. "Hint" (気配, Kehai)
16. "Oyashiro-sama ~Another ver.~" (オヤシロさま ～another ver.～, Oyashirosama ~another ver.~)
17. "Main Theme - Crime ~another ver.~" (メイン･テマ - 罪 ～another ver.～, Main Theme - Crime ~another ver.~)
18. "A Road Home" (ミチシルベ, Michishirube)
19. "Reasoning" (推理, Suiri)
20. "Soft Sunshine" (やわらかな陽光, Yawaraka na Yōkō)
21. "Truth" (真実, Shinjitsu)
22. "Madness" (狂気, Kyōki)
23. "Reason" (理由, Riyū)
24. "Intention" (意図, Ito)
25. "Main Theme - Binding" (メイン･テマ - 結, Mein Tema - Yui)

==== Higurashi no Naku Koro ni Kai ====
===== Volume 1 =====
Higurashi no Naku Koro ni Kai Original Soundtrack Vol. 1

Soundtrack album by Kenji Kawai
- Released: December 12, 2007
- Genre: Anime soundtrack
- Label: Frontier Works

Higurashi no Naku Koro ni Kai Original Soundtrack Vol. 1 is the third official soundtrack, released for the series on December 12, 2007.

Track listing

1. "Main Theme - Solution" (メイン･テマ - 解, Mein Tēma - Kai)
2. "Uneventful ~Slow Ver.~" (平穏無事 ~Slow Ver.~, Heionbuji ~slow ver.~)
3. "Intention ~Alternative Ver.~" (意図 ~Alternative Ver.~, Ito ~alternative ver.~)
4. "Premonition" (予感, Yokan)
5. "Annihilation" (壊灭, Hakai)
6. "A Road Home ~Piano ver.~" (ミチシルベ ～Piano ver.～, Michishirube ~Piano ver.~)
7. "Cute God" (かわいいカミサマ, Kawaii Kamisama)
8. "Skepticism" (懐疑, Kaigi)
9. "Dark Passage" (潜行, Senkou)
10. "Mountain Dog" (山狗, Yamainu)
11. "Masochism ~Another ver.~" (被虐 ～another ver.～, Higyaku ~another ver.~)
12. "Here I Go! ~slow ver.~" (ハリキって行こう! ～slow ver.～, Harikitteikou! ~slow ver.~)
13. "Main Theme - Kai ~Piano ver.~" (メイン・テーマ - 解 ～Piano ver.～, Mein Tēma ~Piano ver.~)
14. "Trap" (罠, Wana)
15. "Silent Protest" (静かなる抗議, Shizuka Naru Kougi)
16. "Disappointment" (失意, Shitsui)
17. "Usual" (いつも通り, Itsumo Doori)
18. "Vanity" (儚り, Hakana)
19. "Elucidation" (解明, Kaimei)
20. "Masochism" (被虐, Higyaku)
21. "Truth" (真相, Shinsou)
22. "Crash" (激突, Gekitotsu)
23. "Story ~Piano ver.~" (ものがたり ～Piano ver.～, Monogatari ~Piano ver.~)
24. "Cherished Desire" (宿望, Shukubou)
25. "Main Theme - Kai ~Another ver.~" (メイン・テーマ - 解 ～another ver.～, Mein Tēma - Kai ~Another ver.~)
26. "Flower of Hell ~Short Ver.~" (奈落の花 ～Short Ver.～, Naraku no Hana ~Short ver.~)

===== Volume 2 =====
Higurashi no Naku Koro ni Kai Original Soundtrack Vol. 2

Soundtrack album by Kenji Kawai
- Released: January 30, 2008
- Genre: Anime soundtrack
- Label: Frontier Works

Higurashi no Naku Koro ni Kai Original Soundtrack Vol. 2 is the fourth official soundtrack, released for the series on January 30, 2008.

Track listing

1. "Main Theme - Orchestra" (メイン･テマ - 囃, Mein Tēma - Hayashi)
2. "Happy" (幸せ, Shiawase)
3. "Huddle" (密談, Mitsudan)
4. "Intrusion" (嵌入, Kannyuu)
5. "Turbulent" (乱, Ran)
6. "Frustration" (挫折, Zasetsu)
7. "Justice!" (正義!, Seigi!)
8. "Excitement" (殺気, Sakki)
9. "Setback" (蹉跌, Satetsu)
10. "Awe" (畏怖, Ifu)
11. "Breakout" (脱走, Dassou)
12. "Main Theme - Orchestra ~Piano ver.~" (メイン･テマ - 囃 ~Piano ver.~, Mein Tema - Hayashi ~Piano ver.~)
13. "Secret" (秘密裏, Himitsu Ura)
14. "Sly" (狡猾, Koukatsu)
15. "Plot" (策略, Sakuryaku)
16. "Silent Protest - Quietly" (静かなる抗議 -粛, Shizuka Naru Kougi - Shuku)
17. "Impatience" (焦燥, Shousou)
18. "Syndrome" (症候群, Shoukougun)
19. "Army" (軍, Gun)
20. "Tragedy" (悲劇, Higeki)
21. "Static" (静, Sei)
22. "Main Theme - Orchestra ~Another ver.~" (メイン･テマ - 囃 ~Another ver.~, Mein Tema - Hayashi ~Another ver.~)
23. "Target a ~Short ver.~" (対象a ~Short ver.~, Taishou a ~Short ver.~)

=== Image album ===
Higurashi no Naku Koro ni Image Album Kakeramusubi

Soundtrack album
- Released: September 27, 2006
- Genre: Anime soundtrack
- Label: Frontier Works

The Higurashi no Naku Koro ni Image Album Kakeramusubi (ひぐらしのなく頃に イメージアルバム かけらむすび, Higurashi no Naku Koro ni Imēji Arubamu Kakeramusubi; When the cicadas cry Image Album: Fragment Binding) was first released on September 27, 2006.

Track listing

1. "Midori no Iro no Yasashii Kaze" (緑の色のやさしい風, lit. Gentle Wind of a Green Color)
  - Composition: Tenmon
2. "my home"
  - Vocals: Haruka Shimotsuki (霜月はるか)
3. "M・A・T・S・U・R・I-Meet Your Match！"
  - Vocals: Kazaha (風葉)
4. "when they cry"
  - Vocals: Rekka Katakiri (片霧烈火)
5. "Mushibami" (蝕み, lit. decay)
  - Composition: zts
6. "hymn"
  - Composition: onoken
  - Vocals: Rekka Katakiri (片霧烈火)
7. "samsara"
  - Vocals: Chata (茶太)
8. "you –Visionen im Spiegel"
  - Vocals: Yuzuki (癒月)
9. "Tsuki no Yoru no Tsumetai Kaze" (月の夜のつめたい風, lit. Cold Wind on a Moonlit Night)
  - Composition: Tenmon

=== Character CDs ===
==== Volume 1 ====
Higurashi character CD volume 1

Soundtrack album by Soichiro Hoshi, Mai Nakahara, Chafurin
- Released: March 28, 2007
- Genre: Anime soundtrack
- Label: Frontier Works

Higurashi no Naku Koro ni Character CD Vol. 1 (ひぐらしのなく頃に キャラクターCD Vol.1, When Cicadas Cry Character CD Vol. 1) was released on March 28, 2007. The tracks on the album were sung by three of the voice actors from the anime adaptation: Soichiro Hoshi (as Keiichi Maebara), Mai Nakahara (as Rena Ryūgū), and Chafurin (as Kuraudo Oishi).

Track listing

1. "Smile Happy Peace ♪" (笑顔・はっぴぃ・ピース♪, Egao Happii Pīsu ♪)
2. "Keiichi & Oishi's Rumours of Murder ABC" (圭一・大石の噂の事件簿ABC, Keiichi Oishi no Jikenbo ABC)
3. "Original Drama 'Rena's Good Thing'" (オリジナルドラマ「レナのかぁいいもの」, Orijinaru Dorama 'Rena no Kaiimono)
4. "'Smile Happy Peace ♪' Karaoke" (笑顔・はっぴぃ・ピース♪ カラオケ, Egao Happii Pīsu ♪ Karaoke)
5. "'Keiichi & Oishi's Rumours of Murder ABC' Karaoke' (圭一・大石の噂の事件簿ABC カラオケ, Keiichi Oishi no Jikenbo ABC)

==== Volume 2 ====
Higurashi character CD volume 2

Soundtrack album by Satsuki Yukino
- Released: April 25, 2007
- Genre: Anime soundtrack
- Label: Frontier Works

Higurashi no Naku Koro ni Character CD Vol. 2 (ひぐらしのなく頃に キャラクターCD Vol.2, When Cicadas Cry Character CD Vol. 2) was released on April 25, 2007. The tracks on the album were sung by Satsuki Yukino, who played both Mion and Shion Sonozaki in the anime.

Track listing

1. "Birthday of Two" (ふたりのバースディ, Futari No Birthday)
2. "Words One Cannot Say" (言えない言葉, Ienai Kotoba)
3. "Original drama "Mion's Confession" (オリジナルドラマ「魅音の告白」, Mion no Kokuhaku)
4. "'Birthday of Two' Karaoke" (ふたりのバースディ カラオケ, Futari no Birthday Karaoke)
5. "'Words One Cannot Say' Karaoke" (言えない言葉 カラオケ, Ienai Kotoba Karaoke)

==== Volume 3 ====
Higurashi character CD volume 3

Soundtrack album by Yukari Tamura, Mika Kanai
- Released: July 25, 2007
- Genre: Anime soundtrack
- Label: Frontier Works

Higurashi no Naku Koro ni Character CD Vol. 3 (ひぐらしのなく頃に キャラクターCD Vol.3, When Cicadas Cry Character CD Vol. 3) was released on July 25, 2007. The tracks on the album were sung by two of the voice actresses from the anime adaptation: Yukari Tamura (as Rika Furude) and Mika Kanai (as Satoko Hojo).

Track listing

1. "Infinite Corridor" (無限回廊, Mugen Kairō)
2. "Love, Love∞Big Brother" (好き好き∞にーにー, Suki Suki∞Nii-nii)
3. "Original drama 'Hinamizawa Ibun'" (オリジナルドラマ「雛見沢異聞」, Orijinaru Dorama 'Hinamizawa Ibun')
4. "'Infinite Corridor' Karaoke" (無限回廊 カラオケ, Mugen Kairō karaoke)
5. "'Love, Love∞Big Brother' Karaoke" (好き好き∞にーにー カラオケ, 'Suki Suki∞Nii-nii' karaoke)

=== Character case books ===
==== Volume 1 ====
Higurashi no Naku Koro ni Kai ~Character Case Book~ Vol. 1

Soundtrack album by Yui Horie, Yukari Tamura
- Released: December 29, 2007
- Genre: Anime soundtrack
- Label: Frontier Works

Higurashi no Naku Koro ni Kai ~Character Case Book~ Vol. 1 (ひぐらしのなく頃に解 ~Character Case Book~ Vol. 1, When Cicadas Cry Character CD Vol. 1) was released on December 29, 2007. The tracks on the album were sung by two of the voice actresses from the anime adaptation: Yukari Tamura (as Rika Furude) and Yui Horie (as Hanyuu).

Track listing

1. "It Is So☆" (なのです☆, Nano Desu☆)
2. "S.A.G.A. ~At the End of the Cycle~" (S.A.G.A. ~輪廻の果てに~, S.A.G.A. ~Rinne no Hate ni~)
3. "Original Drama 'Telepathy?'" (オリジナルドラマ「以心伝心？」, Originaru Dorama 'Ishindeshin?')
4. "'It Is So☆' Karaoke" (なのです☆ カラオケ, Nano Desu☆ Karaoke)
5. "'S.A.G.A. ~At the End of the Cycle~' Karaoke" (S.A.G.A. ~輪廻の果てに~ カラオケ, S.A.G.A. ~Rinne no Hate ni~ Karaoke)

==== Volume 2 ====
Higurashi no Naku Koro ni Kai ~Character Case Book~ Vol. 2

Soundtrack album by Tōru Ōkawa, Miki Itō
- Released: January 16, 2008
- Genre: Anime soundtrack
- Label: Frontier Works

Higurashi no Naku Koro ni Kai ~Character Case Book~ Vol. 2 (ひぐらしのなく頃に解 ~Character Case Book~ Vol. 2, When Cicadas Cry Character CD Vol. 2) was released on December 29, 2007. The tracks on the album were sung by two of the voice actors from the anime adaptation: Tōru Ōkawa (as Jirō Tomitake) and Miki Itō (as Takano Miyo).

Track listing

1. "Bon ~Karma~" (梵 〜karma〜, Bon ~karma~)
2. "Flash of Love" (愛のイナズマ閃光, Ai no Inazuma Senkou)
3. "Original Drama Hinamizawa FM 'Takano Miyo's Bright Hinamizawa'" (オリジナルドラマ FM雛見沢「鷹野三四の明るい雛見沢」, Orijinaru Dorama FM Hinamizawa "Takano Miyo no Akuri Hinamizawa)
4. "'Bon ~Karma~' Karaoke" (梵 〜karma〜 カラオケ, Bon ~karma~ karaoke)
5. "'Flash of Love' Karaoke" (愛のイナズマ閃光 カラオケ, Ai no Inazuma Senkou karaoke)
