= Immaterial and Missing Power =

2004 versus fighting video game

- Developers: Twilight Frontier; Team Shanghai Alice
- Publishers: Twilight Frontier; Team Shanghai Alice
- Series: Touhou Project
- Platform: Microsoft Windows
- Release: December 30, 2004 (Comiket 67)
- Genre: Fighting game
- Modes: Single-player, multiplayer

Touhou Suimusou ~ Immaterial and Missing Power. (Japanese: 東方萃夢想 ～ Immaterial and Missing Power.; lit. "Gathering Dreams in the East"), commonly abbreviated as IaMP in English speaking circles, is a versus fighting game collaboratively developed by Twilight Frontier and Team Shanghai Alice released in 2004. It is the first spinoff in the Touhou series, and it is numbered as the 7.5th installment as the game's events place between Perfect Cherry Blossom (seventh) and Imperishable Night (eighth), although it was released after Imperishable Night. After the success of Immaterial and Missing Power, the game was followed up with Scarlet Weather Rhapsody in 2008, the first of several Touhou fighting game sequels.

== Gameplay ==
Yukari (left) uses a Spell Card on Reimu (right).

Immaterial and Missing Power is a two-dimensional fighting game in which players can select one of several Touhou characters to fight either against an AI, or other human players. Because of Touhou's origins as a bullet hell game, Immaterial and Missing Power's special moves have a focus on large amounts of projectiles. To help counter the large number of enemy projectiles, Immaterial and Missing Power, allows the player to 'graze' enemy projectiles, which gets its namesake from the prior Touhou games. While in the bullet hell Touhou games, grazing refers to having enemy projectiles collide with the player's sprite, but not their hitbox (which is several times smaller), in Immaterial and Missing Power, the player can use an energy meter to completely circumvent enemy projectiles, though not all projectiles can be grazed.

Spell Cards, a central aspect of Touhou since Embodiment of Scarlet Devil, appear in Immaterial and Missing Power as special moves that have to be announced before they can be used. Each character can choose 1 out of 3 normal spell cards, and 1 out of 3 overdrive spell cards to use before a match starts. The overdrive spell card replaces the normal spell card when the player's character has been defeated once. Also, when a spell card is announced, the player's HP replenishes for a certain amount.

Immaterial and Missing Power contains a story mode, an arcade mode in which the player has to fight the entire cast while given only one life, a versus mode, and a practice mode.

In the story mode, there are Spell Cards that are available only to the enemy characters. A Spell Card can be "collected" when the player defeats the enemy character in a limited amount of time when the enemy's Spell Card is in effect. After collecting enemy Spell Cards, they can be viewed in an in-game gallery.

== Plot ==
During Gensokyo's summer, there occurred an incident called the Night Parade of Ten Thousand Demons Every Four Days (三日置きの百鬼夜行). In this incident, the sakura trees have since shed their blossoms, but the hanami kept on going, with feasts being hosted day after day with no end in sight. Additionally, each time the feast is held, an unknown restless spiritual aura in Gensokyo also increases, but this spiritual aura itself had no effect, leading to suspicions of those who went to investigate it. As such, everyone who goes to the feast, be it human or yōkai, appear to be very suspicious. Three days before the next feast, the player character sets out, each on their own, and attempt to investigate.

== Characters ==
Eleven characters are available in Immaterial and Missing Power, including Suika Ibuki, who had her debut in this game. The characters Remilia, Yuyuko, Yukari, and Suika must be unlocked by defeating them in story mode, and Meiling is unlocked by downloading a patch, and completing the story mode, though she does not appear in it.

- Reimu Hakurei (博麗 霊夢): The miko of the Hakurei Shrine and perennial protagonist of the Touhou Project. She is troubled by the constant feasts in the shrine that she has to host, and goes to attack whoever she thinks is responsible. Like in the bullet hell games, she has access to homing projectiles.
- Marisa Kirisame (霧雨 魔理沙): An ordinary human magician, and playable character in each main Touhou game since Phantasmagoria of Dim. Dream. She acts as the secretary in charge of the feasts, though she is unsure of their cause.
- Sakuya Izayoi (十六夜 咲夜): The maid of the Scarlet Devil Mansion introduced in The Embodiment of Scarlet Devil. Sensing a mysterious qi in the feasts, she sets out to investigate. Her main ability consists of being able to throw large amounts of knives.
- Alice Margatroid (アリス・マーガトロイド): A human magician, who lives in the Forest of Magic, alongside Marisa. Alice attempts to exorcise the aura, believing it to be a ghost. She attacks using puppets that she creates.
- Patchouli Knowledge (パチュリー・ノーレッジ): A witch from the Scarlet Devil Mansion who does not usually go out of her library. This time, however, she took responsibility in investigating the mist that has been blanketing Gensokyo. Patchouli is asthmatic, and has poor mobility, but compensates with magical barrages that cover a large area.
- Youmu Konpaku (魂魄 妖夢): A half-human half-ghost, and Yuyuko's gardener and servant. Youmu starts fights with various innocents, assuming them to be the culprits. Her attacks are centred around the usage of her two swords.
- Remilia Scarlet (レミリア・スカーレット): A vampire, and mistress of the Scarlet Devil Mansion, who is thought to be one of the prime suspects in creating the strange mist, because she did it once before in The Embodiment of Scarlet Devil. Because of her childlike physique, she is able to move quickly, and release danmaku that cover a wide area.
- Yuyuko Saigyouji (西行寺 幽々子): The ghost princess of the netherworld. She is also believed to be a suspect, as she orchestrated the incident in Perfect Cherry Blossom. Reflecting her lazy personality, Yuyuko lacks mobility, but her Spell Cards have an unmatched range.
- Yukari Yakumo (八雲 紫): A wandering yōkai, who controls the Hakurei Border.
- Suika Ibuki (伊吹 萃香): Introduced in Immaterial and Missing Power, she is an oni who loves drinks, feasts, and competition, like the rest of her race. Despite her small size, she is strong in strength, speed, and mystic powers; she is also several hundred years old. Using her ability to control density, she can gather people to form a banquet, or she can scatter herself to become mist. In Immaterial and Missing Power, she made the residents of Gensokyo have continuous feasts, intending to draw the joyous oni from hiding.
- Hong Meiling (紅 美鈴): A Chinese-like yōkai and martial artist that was included in a later patch of the game. She has no story mode, as her addition to the playable roster had minimal supervision from ZUN and was a decision mostly made by Twilight Frontier.

== Development ==
Unabara Iruka (海原海豚) of the Twilight Frontier team had wanted to make a fighting game with aerial battles similar to Cyberbots: Full Metal Madness (1995) and Astra Superstars (1998), but felt that creating a whole set of characters and the setting just for the game would be overwhelming. Unabara felt that such a game would not feel out of place in the setting of Touhou, and so he sought out ZUN, the founder of the series, to collaborate on a Touhou fighting game.

Unlike the main Touhou games, which were written developed entirely by ZUN, the dialogue, character sprites, and ending artwork in Immaterial and Missing Power are drawn by alphes, an artist at Twilight Frontier. ZUN was responsible for character design, the plot, stage design, system graphics, Spell Card naming, and a portion of the soundtrack while Twilight Frontier took care of the rest.

On April 2 2004, Twilight Frontier announced the production of Immaterial and Missing Power, with Team Shanghai Alice. On December 21, a demo, which had the first three stages of Reimu's story mode, and the characters Reimu, Marisa, Alice and Youmu available in the versus mode, was released digitally. The finished game was sold at the 67th Comiket on December 30 2004.

The soundtrack of the game was compiled into an album named Gensōkyoku Bassui (幻想曲抜萃) which was sold on August 14, 2005. A significant portion of the soundtrack were remixes of existing Touhou songs.

== Reception ==
On GameSpot, the game had an average user score of 8.6/10.

== See also ==
- Scarlet Weather Rhapsody - the next Touhou fighting game, also produced by ZUN and Twilight Frontier
- List of fighting games
