= Koumajou Densetsu: Scarlet Symphony =

2009 video game

- Developer(s): Frontier Aja
- Publisher(s): CFK (Note: Remastered version only)
- Platform(s): Windows; Nintendo Switch; PlayStation 5
- Release: Windows: JP: August 2009; Nintendo Switch: WW: July 28, 2022; PlayStation 5: WW: August 8, 2024
- Genre(s): Action-adventure
- Mode(s): Single-player

Koumajou Densetsu: Scarlet Symphony (Note: Japanese: 紅魔城伝説 緋色の交響曲, Hepburn: Scarlet Devil Castle Legend) is an Action-adventure Touhou Project fangame developed in 2009 for Windows. The game has also been referred to as Touhouvania. A remaster, titled Koumajou Remilia: Scarlet Symphony (紅魔城レミリア 緋色の交響曲), was announced in 2021, and released on July 28, 2022, for Steam and Nintendo Switch.

== Gameplay ==
Koumajou Densetsu: Scarlet Symphony is an action-adventure with Bullet hell elements, taking heavy influence from the Castlevania series. The player controls Reimu Hakurei, the miko of the Hakurei Shrine, as she navigates the Scarlet Devil Mansion via platforming sections and killing enemies and bosses, which allows Reimu to level up and upgrade her abilities.

== Plot ==
In Koumajou Densetsu: Scarlet Symphony, Reimu Hakurei enters the Scarlet Devil Mansion to stop Remilia Scarlet, who has released red mist across Gensokyo.

== Development ==
Koumajou Densetsu: Scarlet Symphony was released in August 2009 by dojin developer Frontier Aja at that year's Comiket. A remaster by the original developers and Korean publisher CFK was announced in 2021 for Steam and Nintendo Switch. It was originally intended to release the same year, but was later delayed to July 28, 2022. The remaster introduced new dialogue along with recorded voice acting, an official English translation, and improved graphics. This version was released for PlayStation 5 on August 8, 2024.

== Sequel ==
In 2010, a sequel was released, titled Koumajou Densetsu II: Stranger’s Requiem. In Koumajou Densetsu II, the player controls Sakuya Izayoi, the Scarlet Devil Mansion's maid. Similar to the first game, the level design is linear, and the game is divided into multiple stages, each with a boss at the end. Koumajou Densetsu II's gameplay is characteristic of the earlier Castlevania games, such as Super Castlevania IV and Castlevania: Rondo of Blood. Lifted directly from the early Castlevania games, Sakuya can equip one of several sub-weapons, which attack at different angles to the regular attack, but require 'energy', located at various points throughout the stage, in order to use them.
