= Yamabiko (folklore) =

Mountain god in Japanese folklore

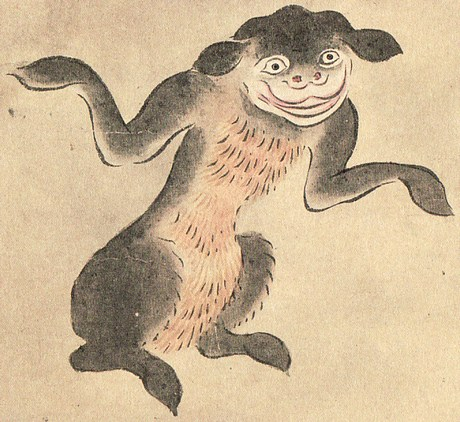
"Yamabiko" (山びこ) from the Hyakkai Zukan by Sawaki Suushi

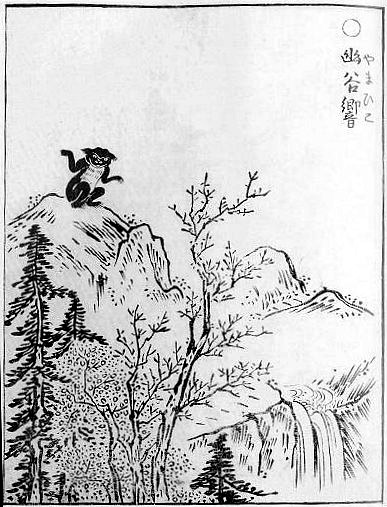
"Yamabiko" (幽谷響) from the Gazu Hyakki Yagyō by Toriyama Sekien

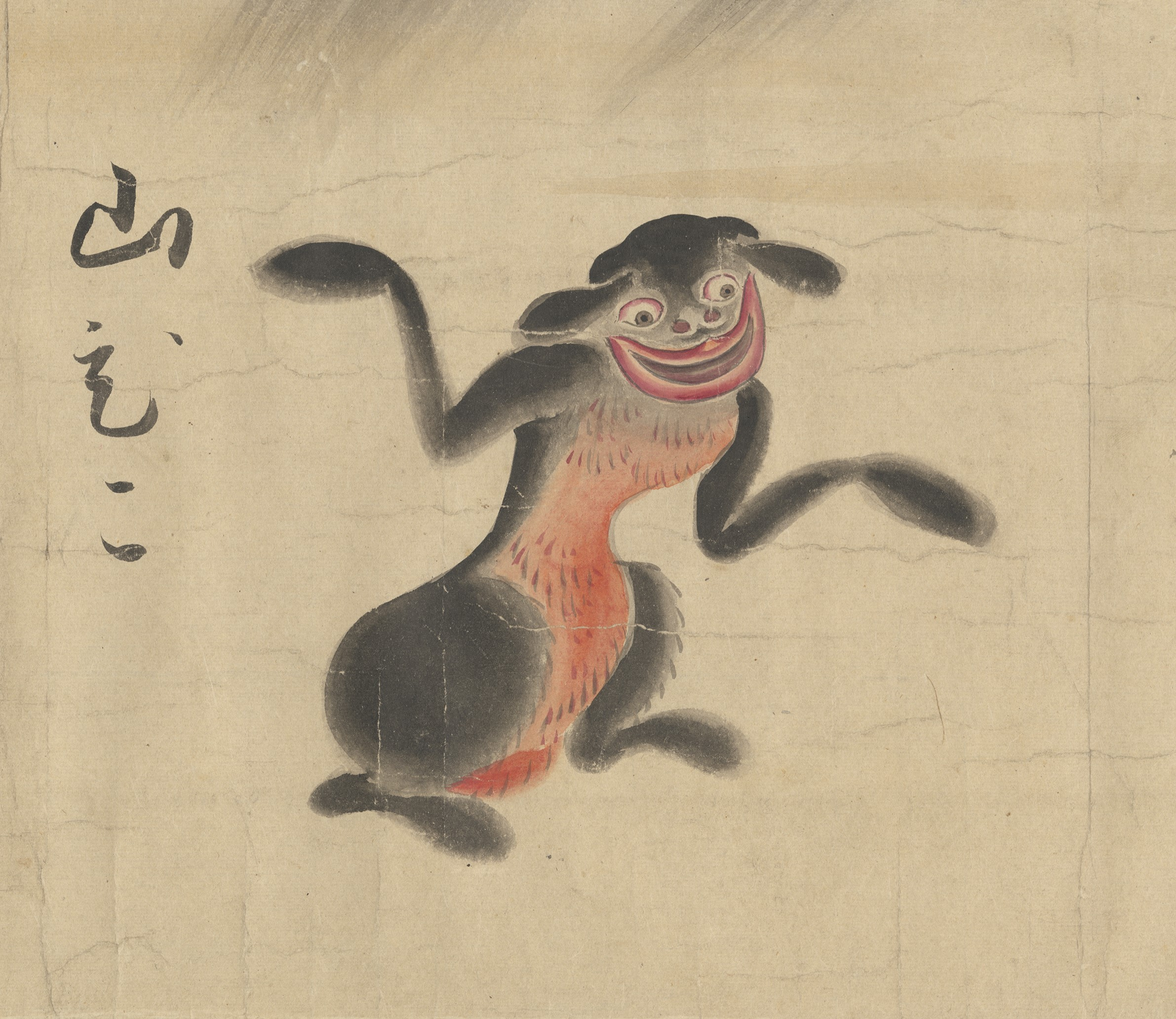
"Yamahiko" (山ひこ) from Bakemono no e (化物之繪, c. 1700), Harry F. Bruning Collection of Japanese Books and Manuscripts, L. Tom Perry Special Collections, Harold B. Lee Library, Brigham Young University.

Yamabiko (山彦, also yamahiko) is a mountain god, spirit, and yōkai in Japanese folklore; the term "yamabiko" also refers to the echo that occurs in mountains, after which the yōkai is named. Literally translated, the term means "mountain boy". It is the yōkai responsible for the natural phenomenon in mountains or canyons. Living deep in the mountains, direct encounters with the yamabiko are rare. Often they are heard, but never seen. The small and elusive yokai wasn't officially classified until the Edo period in Japan. Instead the bizarre noises coming from the mountain were attributed to a natural phenomenon, like birds, and not given any spiritual significance. It is usually depicted with gray fur, peach-colored belly, floppy ears, large grin, and arms outstretched as though it is caught mid-shrug.

== Mythology ==
The yamabiko is a small creature that resembles a cross between a dog and a monkey.

The term "yamabiko" is also used to describe the phenomenon of a delayed echo in mountains and valleys, and is thought to be the spirit answering. In this case, it is written as 幽谷響. This anomaly is also sometimes called "kodama", when it is thought to be the answering voice of a tree spirit (木霊 or 木魂).

== Legends by area ==
In Tottori, Tottori Prefecture, a yobuko (呼子, "calling child") or a yobukodori (呼子鳥, "small calling bird") that lives in the mountain is thought to give out the yamabiko's voice. In Kusuyama of Hashikami village, Hata District, Kōchi Prefecture (now Sukumo), regardless of whether it was day or night, when a sudden dreadful voice is heard deep in the mountains, this strange phenomenon is called "yamahiko".

They are sometimes seen to be the same as the yamawaro, spoken of in Western Japan, as well as the yamako in the Wakan Sansai Zue, and as it is thought that tree spirits would cause yamabiko to occur, they are also seen to be the same as the yōkai penghou that lives in trees. In collections of yōkai depictions like the Hyakkai Zukan and the Gazu Hyakki Yagyō, the yamabiko that looks like a dog is thought to be based on the yamako or the penghou.

The aforementioned yobukodori of Tottori is said to take on the appearance of a bird, and other than that, there is also a small rock mountain in Kitaazumi District, Nagano Prefecture called the "yamabiko rock" (山彦岩) that return people's words, among other appearances of the word "yamabiko", and thus it can be seen that the yamabiko as yōkai are not uniform in either origin or what kind of yōkai they are.

== See also ==
- Kakuen
- List of legendary creatures from Japan
- Penghou
- Satori
