= Simians in Chinese culture =

Role of simians in the historical and current culture of China

Monkeys (particularly macaques) and apes (particularly gibbons), have played significant roles in Chinese culture for over two thousand years. Some examples familiar to English speakers include the zodiacal Year of the Monkey, the Monkey King Sun Wukong in the novel Journey to the West, familiar from its TV version Monkey, and Monkey Kung Fu.

Apes and monkeys are among the most intelligent animals in the animal kingdom according to Chinese culture.

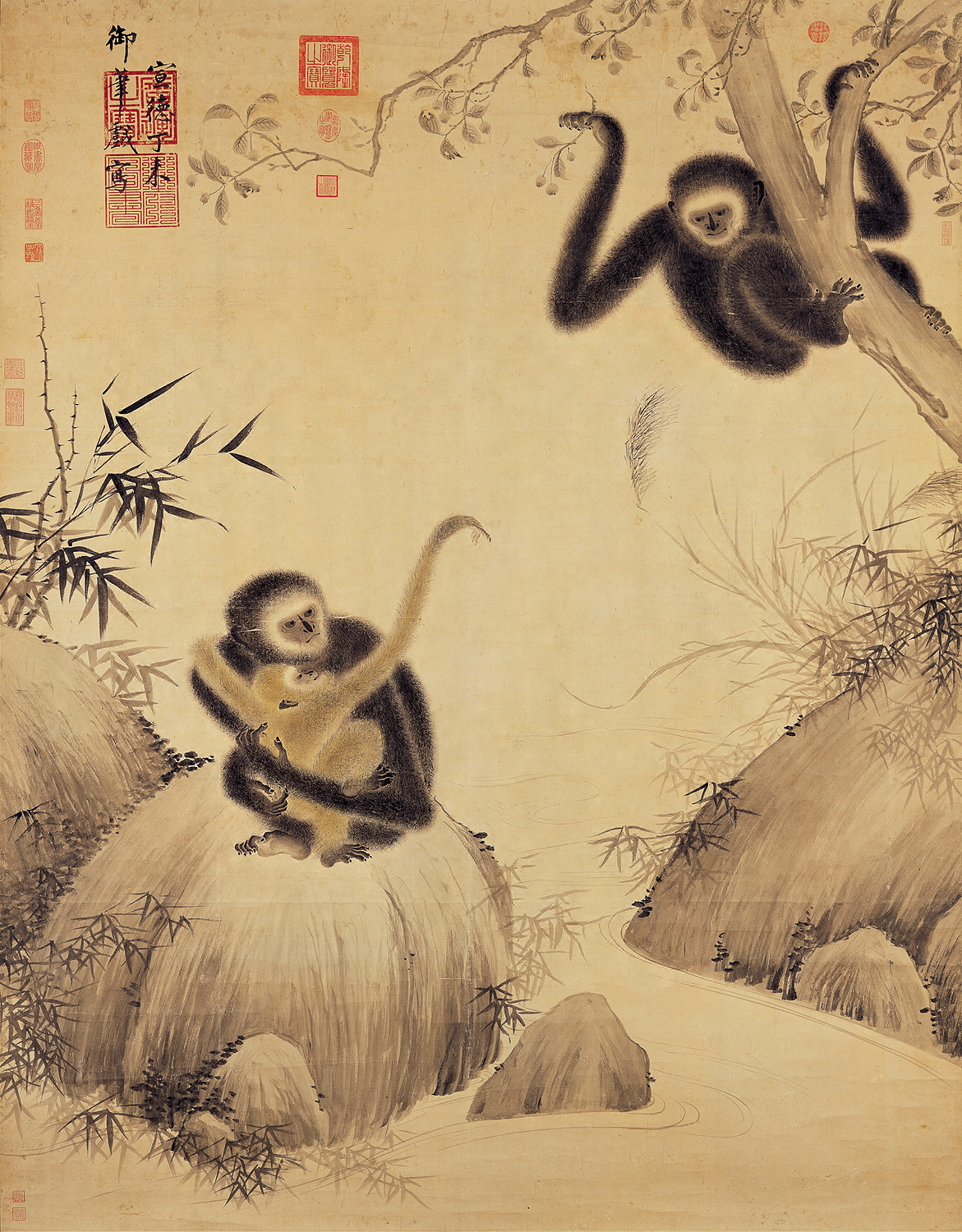
Gibbons at play, 1427 painting by the Xuande Emperor

== Terminology ==
The Chinese language has numerous words meaning "simian; monkey; ape", some of which have diachronically changed meanings in reference to different simians. For instance, Chinese xingxing 猩猩 was originally named "a mythical creature with a human face and pig body", and became the modern name for the "orangutan".

Within the classification of Chinese characters, almost all "monkey; ape" words – with the exceptions of nao 夒 and yu 禺 that were originally monkey pictographs – are written with radical-phonetic compound characters. These characters combine a radical or classifier that roughly indicates semantic field, usually the "dog/quadruped radical" 犭 for simians, and a phonetic element that suggests pronunciation. For instance, this animal classifier is a graphic component in hou 猴 (with a hou 侯 "marquis" phonetic) "macaque; monkey" and yuan 猿 (with yuan 袁 "long robe") "gibbon; monkey".

Note that the following discussion of "monkey; ape" terminology will cite three fundamental sources. The oldest extant Chinese dictionary, the (c. 3rd century BCE) Erya (Chapter 18, 釋獸 "Explaining Wild Animals") glosses seven names for monkeys and monkey-like creatures in the 寓屬 "Monkey/Wild Animal" taxonomy. The first Chinese character dictionary, the (121 CE) Shuowen Jiezi defines many names of simians, primarily under the (犬部 "dog/quadruped" radical) in Chapter 11. The classic Chinese pharmacopoeia, Li Shizhen's (1597) Bencao Gangmu (獸之四 "Animals No. 4" chapter) lists medical uses for five Yu 寓 "monkeys" and three Kuai 怪 "supernatural beings". The latter are wangliang 魍魎 "a demon that eats the livers of corpses", penghou 彭侯 "a tree spirit that resembles a black tailless dog", and feng 封 "an edible monster that resembles a two-eyed lump of flesh".

Li Shizhen distinguishes 11 varieties of monkeys:

A small one with a short tail is called Hou ([猴] monkey). If it looks like a monkey but has a prominent moustache, then it is called Ju [狙]. If it looks like a monkey but is bigger, then it is Jue [貜]. A monkey that is big, with red eyes and a long tail, is called Yu [禺]. A monkey that is small but has a long tail and an upright nose is called You [狖]. A monkey that is similar to You but is bigger is called Guoran [果然]. A monkey that is similar to You but smaller is called Mengsong [蒙頌]. A monkey that is similar to You but jumps a lot is called Canhu [獑猢]. A monkey that has long arms is called Yuan ([猿] ape). A monkey that is similar to Yuan but has a golden tail is called Rong [狨]. A monkey that is similar to Yuan but bigger, and can eat apes and monkeys, is called Du [獨]. (s.v. Jue)

=== Nao ===
Oracle script for nao 夒 "a monkey"

bronze script for nao 夒 "a monkey"

Seal script for nao 夒 "a monkey"

Seal script for kui 夔 "a demon"

Nao 夒 was the first "monkey" term recorded in the historical corpus of written Chinese, and frequently appeared in (14th–11th centuries BCE) Shang dynasty oracle bone inscriptions. This oracle pictograph of "a monkey" showed its head, arms, legs, and short tail; which were convergented as 目/頁 ("head"/"eye"), 又/爪 ("hand"/"claw") and later 止 ("foot", which was a corruption from 爪 in this character), 已/巳 ("finished"/"foetus", which was corrupt from the tail) not later than the end of (6th century BCE) Spring and Autumn period bronze script. Compare the seal character for kui 夔 "a legendary demon with a human face and body of a monkey/dragon", which resembles the seal character for nao with the addition of what appears to be long hair on its head.

This graphically complex character nao 夒 "monkey" had an early variant nao 獿 (with the "quadruped" radical and nao phonetic), and a simpler replacement nao 猱 "monkey" (same radical and a rou 柔 phonetic), which is common in modern usage.

The etymology of nao < *nû 夒 or 猱 "monkey" "is elusive", and may be connected with Proto-Mon–Khmer *knuuy "macaque; monkey" or Proto-Tibeto-Burman *mruk; compare *ŋoh 禺 next.

The first Chinese character dictionary, the (121 CE) Shuowen Jiezi defines nao 夒 as "a greedy animal, generally said to be a muhou "monkey" resembling a person" (貪獸也一曰母猴似人); see muhou below.

The poet Li Bai alludes to nao (猱) populating the Taihang Mountains, in the north of China, near the capital city Chang'an, in the poem "白馬篇": it should be duly noted that this literary source contextually suggests a temporal location of the West Han era.

=== Yu ===
Yu 禺 "monkey" appeared on (11th–3rd centuries BCE) Zhou dynasty Chinese ritual bronzes as a pictograph showing a head, arms, and a tail. Yu "forenoon, 9 to 11 AM" is the second of five daily divisions (更) in the traditional Chinese calendar. Banyu 番禺 was "a district in Guangzhou". In modern Chinese scientific usage, yu 禺 refers to the Central and South American "spider monkey".

The etymology of yu < *ŋoh 禺 "monkey" links with Kukish *ŋa:w "ape" > Lushai ŋau "grey monkey"; compare *nû 夒 above.

The Shuowen Jiezi defines yu 禺 as "a kind of muhou "monkey" with a head resembling a gui "ghost"" (母猴屬頭似鬼). Compare the above definition of nao as a muhou "monkey" resembling a person.

Yu 禺 has a graphic variant yu 寓 (with the "roof radical") "reside; imply". The Erya (18) lists monkey definitions under a yushu 寓屬 "wild animal category". Guo Pu's commentary explains yu 寓 inclusively means all shou 獸 "wild animals", and van Gulik says it means "primates in general".

The Shanhaijing uses yu 禺 to describe the xingxing, "There is an animal on the mountain which looks like a long-tailed ape, but it has white ears. It crouches as it moves along and it runs like a human. Its name is the live-lively. If you eat it, you'll be a good runner".

The Shanhaijing records a mythical yugu 禺谷 "monkey valley", the place where the sun sets, which suggests that "the monkey is a kind of guardian of the approaches to the nether World". Kuafu 禺谷 "Boast Father raced with the sun and ran with the setting sun", but died of thirst on the way. Yugu is also written as yu 虞 "predict; deceive" or ou 偶 "human image; mate".

=== Hou and Muhou ===
Hou 猴 "monkey; macaque" is a common name for simians. For instance, houzi 猴子 means "monkey" or "clever/glib person". Muhou 母猴 "macaque; rhesus monkey" compounds mu "mother" and hou "monkey", and can also mean "female monkey" in modern usage. Van Gulik says that muhou is a phonetic rendering of a non-Chinese term" because mu- occurs in four variants: 母 and 沐 "wash one's hair" in Zhou texts, and 米 "rice" or 獼 in Han texts. In modern Chinese usage, mihou 獼猴 means "macaque; rhesus monkey". The etymology of hou < Old Chinese *gô 猴 "monkey" probably derives from Sino-Tibetan *ʔ-ko. The first syllable in muhou < *môʔ-gô 母猴 or muhou < *môk-gô 沐猴 "macaque" may perhaps be a "pre-initial" supported by the Lolo-Burmese mjo k^{h}œ < *mjok "monkey", which might have been the source of Proto-Tocharian *moko.

Lu Ji, who was from the southern state of Wu, noted muhou was a Chu word: "The nao is the macaque [mihou], called by the people of Chu [muhou]. After a macaque has grown old, he becomes a que [貜]. Macaques with long arms are called gibbons (yuan). Gibbons with a white waist are called [chan 獑]." Van Gulik explains the legendary que with the grey whiskers of mature macaques, and associates the chan with the rhesus macaque, or huchan 胡獑, found in present day Yunnan.

The Lüshi Chunqiu mentions the muhou and notes its similarity to humans.

The Shuowen jiezi defines hou as nao, and defines nao 夒, yu 禺, jue 玃, and wei 蜼 as muhou.

The Bencao gangmu lists mihou synonyms of: muhou 沐猴, weihou 為猴, husun 胡孫, wangsun 王孫, maliu 馬留, and ju 狙; and Li Shizhen explains the names.

The book Baihu Tongyi by Ban Gu: Hou means "wait" [hou 候, n.b., hou 猴 does not occur in the received text]. When it sees a man put some food in a trap, it will stay in a higher position and look at the food for a long time. It is an animal that is good at waiting. The macaque likes to wash its face by rubbing, so it is called Mu [沐 "washing"]. The character was later distorted to Mu ([母] meaning "mother"), which is even further from the original meaning. The book Shuowen Jiezi (Book of Philology by Xu Shen): The character Hou looks like Muhou (monkey), but it is not a female monkey. As macaque looks like a person from the Hu region (the north and west of China where non-Han ethnic groups lived in ancient times), it is called Husun [胡孫]. In the book Zhuang Zi, it is called Ju [狙]. People raise macaques in stables. In this way, horses will not be attacked by disease. So it is colloquially called Maliu ([馬留] meaning "maintaining the horses") in the Hu region (the north and west of China where non-Han ethnic groups lived in ancient times). In Sanskrit books it is called Mosizha [摩斯咤] (transliteration [of markaţa]).

Bernard E. Read notes, "The menstrual discharge of the monkey [猴經] is said to give immunity to the horse against infectious disease", and suggests the Sanskrit name "is not so remote from the genus name Macacus". Husun "macaque; monkey" is also written 猢猻, as punned in the surname of Sun Wukong 孫悟空 "descendent/monkey awakened to emptiness". Maliu 馬留 (lit. "horse keep") compares with the Cantonese ma^{B2}lɐu^{A1} "monkey" word.

=== Yuan and naoyuan ===
Yuan 猿 "ape; monkey" is used in Chinese terms such as yuanren 猿人 "ape-man; Hominidae" and Beijing yuanren 北京猿人 "Peking Man".

The etymology of yuan < *wan 猿 "monkey" could be linked with Proto-Tibeto-Burman *(b)woy or Proto-Mon–Khmer *swaaʔ "monkey".

Yuanhou 猿猴 "apes and monkeys", according to Van Gulik, originally meant only "gibbons and macaques" but in the last few centuries, it has been widely used in Chinese literature as a comprehensive term for "monkeys". The Japanese language word enkō 猿猴 is likewise means "monkey" in general.

Naoyuan 猱蝯 compounds the nao 夒 variant 猱 with yuan 蝯 (combining the "insect radical" 虫 and yuan 爰 phonetic). Yuan has graphic variants of 猨 and 猿. The Erya defines "The naoyuan is good at climbing" (猱蝯善援), based upon a pun between yuan 蝯 "monkey" and yuan 援 "pull up; climb" (both characters written with the same phonetic element).

Nao 猱 occurs once in the Classic of Poetry, "Do not teach a monkey to climb trees" (毋教猱升木). Lu Ji's 3rd-century commentary says "The nao is the macaque [mihou], the people of Chu call it muhou (see above). In disagreement, Van Gulik gives reasons why nao 猱 means "gibbon" not "macaque". First, the Erya stresses "climbing" as the simian's main characteristic. Second, Zhou dynasty texts record the nao as "a typical tree-ape". Third, numerous early literary sources use naoyuan or yuannao as a binomial compound.

Van Gulik distinguishes nao 猱 "gibbon" from the homonym nao 獶 "monkey" (with a you 憂 phonetic replacing the uncommon 夒 in nao 獿)

The term nao 獿 occurs in the Record of Music chapter of the Book of Rites criticizing vulgar pantomimes, "Actors take part therein, and dwarfs who resemble nao, men and women mix, and the difference between parents and children is not observed"; "here nao clearly means a macaque, familiar through the popular monkey-shows."

Van Gulik suggests that Chinese yuan "gibbon" was a loanword from the language of Chu, the southernmost state of the Zhou realm. Qu Yuan's (c. 3rd-century) Chuci uses the term yuanyou 猿狖 three times (in Nine Pieces); for instance, "Amid the deep woods there, in the twilight gloom, are the haunts where monkeys live." This text also uses yuan 猿 once (Nine Songs), yuan 蝯 once (in Nine Laments), and houyuan 猴猿 once (in Nine Longings). If yuanyou was Qu Yuan's (or another Chuci author's) rendering of a Chu word for "gibbon", then naoyuan can be understood as a compound of the native Chinese word nao "monkey in general" and the sinified loanword yuan "gibbon"; and gradually, "nao 猱 came to mean "gibbon", whereas nao 獶 remained reserved for monkeys." You 狖 was a Zhou synonym for "gibbon".

During the first centuries of our era, the binoms naoyuan or yuannao were superseded as words for "gibbon" by the single term yuan 猨, written with the classifier "quadruped" instead of that for "insect" 虫; and one prefers the phonetic 袁 to 爰 (rarely 員). This character yuan 猿 has remained the exclusive term for the Hylobatidae as long as the Chinese in general were familiar with the gibbon. However, when in the course of the centuries more and more mountainous regions were brought under cultivation, and as the deforestation increased accordingly, the habitat of the gibbon shrank to the less accessible mountain forests in the south and south-west, and the Chinese had few opportunities for seeing actual specimens. Until about the 14th century A.D. one may assume with confidence that when a Chinese writer employs the word yuan 猿, he means indeed a gibbon. Thereafter, however, the majority of Chinese writers knowing about the gibbon only by hearsay, they began to confuse him with the macaque or other Cynopithecoids – a confusion which has lasted till the present day.

The Bencao gangmu notes that, "the gibbon's meat may be taken as medicine against hemorrhoids, which may be cured also by always using a gibbon's skin as seat-cover. The fat used as ointment is said to be a wonderful cure for itching sores."

=== Rong ===
Rong 狨 was "a long-haired monkey with golden fur that was highly prized". Read suggests it is the "lar gibbon, Hylobates entelloides", and Luo identifies it as the golden snub-nosed monkey Rhinopitheeus roxellana. In addition to meaning "golden snub-nosed monkey", Van Gulik notes that in modern Chinese zoological terminology, rong denotes the Callitrichidae (or Hapalidae) family including marmosets and tamarins.

The Bencao gangmu entry for the rong 狨 explains the synonym nao 猱 signifies this monkey's rou 柔 "soft; supple" hair.

The hair of the golden monkey is long and soft. So it is called Rong (meaning "fine hair"). Nao is a character meaning "soft." Another explanation says that the animal is found in the western Rong region [Sichuan], so it is thus named. There is a kind of long-hair dog that is also called Nao. ... The book Tan Yuan [談苑] by Yang Yi (楊億): The golden monkey is found in the deep mountains in Sichuan and Shaanxi. It looks like an ape. It has a long tail of golden color. So it is colloquially called Jinsirong [金絲狨] (meaning "golden thread monkey"). It is quick at climbing trees. It loves its tail dearly. When shot by a poisonous arrow, it will bite off its own tail when poisoned. During the Song dynasty (960–1279), only officials of the administration and military of the third rank and above were allowed to use seats and bedding made of golden monkey hide.

This entry has two subheadings: the yuan 猨 or changbeihou 長臂猴 "gibbon, Hylobates agilis" and the du 獨 (below).

The ape is good at climbing trees. It is found in the deep mountains in the Chuan and Guang regions. It looks like a monkey, but has very long arms. It is an animal that can practice [Daoist] qi (Vital Energy), so it lives a long life. Some say it has one arm stretching from one side to the other. This is not correct. Its arm bone can be made into a flute that sounds very clear and resonant. Apes come in different colors: blue-green, white, black, yellow and crimson. It is a kind and quiet animal, and likes to eat fruits. It lives in forests and can jump over a distance of several dozen chi. But when it falls and drops onto the ground, it may suffer from excessive diarrhea and then die. Treatment is the drinking of juice of Fuzi/radix aconiti lateralis/daughter root of common monkshood. Apes live in groups. The male cries a lot. It makes three cries consecutively. The cry sounds miserable and is penetrating. The book Guihai Zhi [桂海志] by Fan Chengda: There are three varieties of apes: Yellow ones with golden thread; black ones with jade faces; and black ones with black faces. Some say the pure black one is the male, and the golden thread one is the female. A male one shouts and a female does not. The book Rixun Ji [日詢記] by Wang Ji: People in the Guang region say that when an ape is born, it is black and male, When it gets old, it turns yellow and its genitals become ulcerous, and then it turns into a female. Then it mates with the black one. After another several hundred years, the yellow ape will evolve into a white one.

=== Jue and Juefu ===
Juefu 貜父 "a large monkey" compounds jue "an ape" and fu "father". The character jue 貜 combines the "cat/beast radical" 豸 and a jue 矍 "look startled" phonetic (with two 目 "eyes"); compare the graphic variants of 玃 and 蠼. Based upon this phonetic element, the Erya glosses: "Juefu, good at looking." (貜父善顧). The juefu is also called jueyuan 玃猿, which is known as Kakuen in Japanese mythology.

The fulu 附錄 "appendix" to the Bencao gangmu entry for mihou "macaque" adds the jue 玃 "A species of large ape or hoolock, found in Western China, and said to be six feet high, it probably denotes the great gibbon, Hylobates", the "northern gray gibbon, Hylobates muelleri funereus" (viz., Müller's Bornean gibbon); and the ju 豦 (graphically "tiger" and "pig") "wild boar; a yellow and black monkey" or jufu 舉父 "lift/raise father", the "lion-tailed macaque, Macaca/Inuus silenus". The jue entry says:

It is a kind of old monkey. It lives in the mountains in western Sichuan. It looks like a monkey. But it is bigger and is gray and black. It can walk like a human. It robs things from humans, and looks around its surrounding from time to time. There are only male ones and no female ones, so it is also called Juefu (father monkey) or Jiajue. It may kidnap a girl and marry her to have children. The book Shenyi Jing: There is a kind of animal called Zhou in the west that is as big as a donkey but looks like a monkey. It can climb trees. There are only female ones and no males. They block the road in the mountains and kidnap men who happen to pass on the road. The men are then forced to mate with then. This is the way the animal gets offspring. It is also a kind of Jue, but a female one.

This all-female zhou monkey is written with a non-Unicode character, combining the 豸 radical and zhou 周 phonetic.

Li Shizhen describes the ju(fu):

It is found in the mountains in Jianping. It is the size of a dog but looks like a monkey. It is black and yellow, and covered with a big beard and bristles. It may throw stones to strike humans. The book Xishan Jing: There is a kind of animal in Chongwu Mountain. It looks like Yu but has long arms. It is good at throwing stones. It is called Jufu.

=== Ju ===
Ju 狙 originally meant "macaque; monkey" and came to mean "spy; watch for" (e.g., juji 狙擊 "attack from ambush). The Shuowen jiezi defines ju as "a kind of [jue] monkey, also said to mean a dog that briefly bites a person" (玃屬一曰狙犬也暫齧人者).

The (c. 4th–3rd centuries BCE) Zhuangzi was the oldest Chinese classic to use ju. For instance, it has two versions of a quote from Laozi (called Lao Dan 老聃, lit. "old helixless-ears") using the term yuanzu 猿狙 "gibbon and macaque; monkey" to exemplify someone who is not a Daoist sage.

"Compared to the sages," said Old Longears "he would be like a clerk at his labors or a craftsman tied to his work, toiling his body and vexing his mind. Furthermore, it is the patterned pelt of the tiger and the leopard that bring forth the hunter, it is the nimbleness of the gibbon and the monkey that bring forth the trainer with his leash. Can such as these be compared with enlightened kings?" (7)

The Shanhaijing mentions two mythological animals named with ju. First, the xieju 猲狙 (with xie or he "short-muzzled dog"):

There is an animal on this mountain which looks like a wolf, but it has a scarlet head and rat eyes. It makes a noise like a piglet. Its name is the snubnose-dogwolf. It eats humans. (4)

Second, the zhuru 狙如 (with ru "be like"):

There is an animal on this mountain which looks like a white-eared rat; it has white ears and white jaws. Its name is the monkey-like. Whenever it appears, that kingdom will have a great war. (5)

=== Xingxing ===
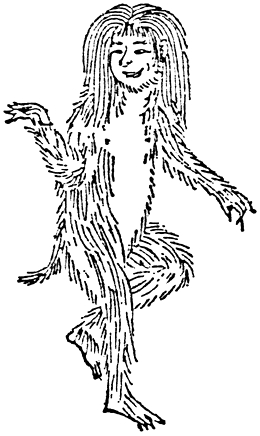
A shōjō illustration from the 1712 Wakan Sansai Zue

Xingxing 猩猩 or shengsheng 狌狌"a monkey; orangutan" reduplicates xing, which graphically combines the "quadruped radical" with a xing 星 "star" phonetic, or with sheng 生 "life" in the variant xing or sheng 狌. The name is used for foreign simians in modern terminology, xingxing means "orangutan", heixingxing with hei- 黑 "black" means "chimpanzee", and daxingxing with da- 黑 "large" means "gorilla".

The Erya says, "The [xingxing] is small, and likes to cry." (猩猩小而好啼). Guo Pu's commentary notes, "The Shanhaijing says: It has a human face and the body of a pig, and it is able to speak. At present it is found in [Jiaoji] and the [Fengxi] district (i.e. North Indo-China). The [xingxing] resembles a [huan 獾] (badger) or small pig. Its call resembles the crying of a small child." Fengxi 封谿 corresponds to modern Bắc Ninh Province in Vietnam.

The Huainanzi says, "The orangutan knows the past but does not know the future; the male goose knows the future but does not know the past."; Gao You's commentary says, "The [xingxing] has a human face but the body of a beast, and its colour is yellow. It is fond of wine."

The Bencao gangmu entry for the xingxing or shengsheng, which Read identifies as the "orangutan, Simia satyrus", records,

Li Shizhen: An orangutan can talk and knows about the future. Xingxing [猩猩] means [xingxing 惺惺] "intelligent". The orangutan was recorded in books like Er Ya and Yi Zhou Shu several dozen times. The following explanation is a summary: It is found in the mountain valleys in the Ailaoyi area and Fengxi County in Jiaozhi. It looks like a dog or a macaque. Its yellow hair resembles that of an ape, and its white ears resemble those of a pig. Its face looks human, and its legs are similar to those of a man. It has long hair and a good-looking face and head. It cries in the same way as a baby cries, or as a dog barks. They flock together and move covertly. Ruan Qian: Local people in Fengxi catch the animal in the following way: They place some wine and straw sandals on the roadside. Orangutans will come to the spot and call out the names of the ancestors of the people who placed the things. Then they leave temporarily and come back shortly afterwards. They drink the wine and try the sandals on. While the orangutans are enjoying themselves, people catch them and then keep them in cages. When one of them is to be killed, the fattest one will be chosen. It weeps sadly. People in the Xihu area use its blood to dye a kind of woolen fabric, which will maintain its bright color for a long time. After a puncture is made in the orangutan to let out blood, the person will flog the animal and ask it for the number of beatings. The flogging will stop after one dou of blood has been collected. The book Li Ji (Record of Rites) said that the orangutan could speak. The book Guang Zhi by Guo Yigong said that the orangutan could not speak. The book Shanhai Jing also said that the orangutan could speak. [Li Shizhen comments]: The orangutan is a kind of animal that looks like a human being. It looks like an ape or a monkey and can speak simple words like a parrot. It may not be the same as what Ruan Qian said. The book Er Ya Yi by Luo Yuan: In ancient books, the orangutan was described as similar to a pig, dog or monkey. But now it is recorded that the animal looks like a baboon. It looks like a naked bare-foot woman with long hair hanging from the head. They do not seem to have knees, and they travel in a group. When they encounter human beings, they cover their bodies with their hands. People say this is a kind of savage human. According to what Luo Yuan said, it seems such a creature is actually a Yenü (meaning "wild girl") or Yepo (meaning "wild woman"). Are they the same?

The subentry for the yenü 野女 "wild women" or 野婆 "wild wife" says,

The book Bowu Zhi [博物志] by Tang Meng: In the Rinan area there is a kind of creature called the Yenü (meaning "wild girl") that travels in group. No male ones are to be found. They are white and crystal-like, wearing no clothes. The book Qidong Yeyu by Zhou Mi: Yepo (meaning "wild woman") is found in Nandanzhou. It has yellow hair shaped into coils. It is naked and wears no shoes. It looks like a very old woman. All of them are female and there are no male ones. They climb up and down the mountain as fast as golden monkeys. Under their waists are pieces of leather covering their bodies. When they encounter a man, they will carry him away and force him to mate. It is reported once that such a creature was killed by a strong man. It protected its waist even when it was being killed. After dissecting the animal, a piece of seal chip was found that was similar to a piece of gray jade with inscriptions on it. Li Shizhen: According to what Ruan Qian and Luo Yuan said above, it seems that this Yenü is actually an orangutan. As to the seal chip found in the animal, it is similar to the case that the testes of a male mouse are said to have seal characters [fuzhuan 符篆 "symbolic seal script"] on them, and the case that under the wing of a bird a seal of mirror has been found. Such things are still unclear to us.

The bright scarlet dye known as xingxingxue 猩猩血 "gibbon's blood" was not used by the Chinese, but observed in imported Western textiles. Although the source for this tradition of the bloody dye remains untraced, Edward H. Schafer notes a Western analogue in "St. John's blood", a variety of the red dye kermes, which derives from the insect kermes. The Tang dynasty chancellor Pei Yan wrote,

The hu ["barbarians"] of the Western countries take its blood for dyeing their woolen rugs; its color is clean and will not turn black. Some say that when you prick it for its blood, if you ask, "How much will you give me?" the [xingxing] will say, "Would two pints be truly enough?" In order to add to this amount, you thrash it with a whip before asking and it will go along with an increase, so that you can obtain up to a gallon. (Quan Tangwen 全唐文).

Edward H. Schafer quotes a Tang story.

A number of the beasts were captured and put in a pen, to be cooked for the magistrate of a Tonkinese town. They picked the fattest of their number and thrust it weeping forth, to await the magistrate's pleasure in a covered cage: "The Commandant asked what thing this was, and the [xingxing] spoke from within the cage, and said, 'Only your servant and a jug of wine!' The Commandant laughed, and cherished it." Of course the clever, winebibbing animal became a treasured pet.

The Chinese belief that gibbons enjoyed drinking wine has parallels in Classical antiquity, "monkeys were reputed to be overfond of wine, as Aristotle, Aelian, and Pliny observed, and their drunkenness made them easy to capture." Chinese stories about the xingxing liking wine appealed to the Japanese. In Japanese mythology, the Shōjō 猩猩 was a god of wine with a red face and long, red hair, who was always drunk and dancing merrily. Compare the drunken monkey hypothesis that the human attraction to ethanol may have a genetic basis.

=== Feifei ===
Feifei 狒狒 "monkey; baboon" reduplicates fei, written with the "dog/quadruped radical" 犭with a fu 弗 phonetic. Van Gulik says Chinese zoologists have adopted feifei as a convenient modern rendering of "baboon".

The Erya glosses, "The feifei resembles a person; it has long hair hanging down on its back; it runs quickly and devours people." (狒狒如人被髮迅走食人). Guo Pu's commentary says,

This is the [xiaoyang 梟羊] "owl-goat". The [Shanhaijing] says: As to its shape it has a human face, with long lips; its body is black, with hair hanging down to its heels. When meeting with people it laughs. This animal occurs in N[orth] Indo-China, [Guangxi], and [Guangdong]. The large ones are over ten feet tall. Locally the animal is called [shandu 山都].

Xiaoyang 梟羊 is a variant of the mythic xiaoyang 梟楊 "owl-poplar", which David Hawkes describes as "an anthropoid monster whose upper lip covers his face when he laughs. His laughter was sinister, it was said, being an indication that he was about to eat human flesh."

The Shuowen Jiezi writes feifei 𥝋𥝋 with an obsolete pictograph, and Xu Shen says: "People in the north call it Tulou [土螻 "earth cricket"]. Now people call it Renxiong [人熊 "man bear"]."

The (c. 9th century) Miscellaneous Morsels from Youyang describes the feifei.

If one drinks its blood one can see ghosts. Its strength equals ten-thousand catties. When it laughs, it curls up its upper lip which then covers its forehead. It has the shape of a macaque and it is capable of human speech, which sounds like the twitter of birds. It can foretell births and deaths. Its blood can be used as a purple dye and its hair for making wigs. An old tradition says that its feet are reversed. Hunters say it has no knees, so that when sleeping it has always to lean against some support. In the early Liu Song dynasty period (420 to 479 A.D.), Guangxi sent a pair of [feifei] as tribute.

Regarding this widely copied fanzhong 反踵 "reversed feet" description, Van Gulik reasons that a copyist misread the ji 及 "extend; down to" in Guo Pu's 及踵 "hair hanging down to its heels" comment as fan 反 "reverse; opposite". He further suggests that the human face, long lips, and long red hair description of the feifei could apply to the orangutan.

The Bencao gangmu entry for feifei, identified as the "golden snub-nosed monkey, Rhinopithecus roxellanae" and "baboon" Papio hamadryas, lists other synonyms of xiaoyang 梟羊 "owl goat", yeren 野人 "wild man; savage" (see Yeren), and shandu 山都 "mountain capital".

Chen Cangqi: The baboon is found in the Yi areas in the southwest. The book Er Ya: The baboon is in the shape of a human being with disheveled hair. It runs very fast and may eat humans. The book Shanhai Jing: Xiaoyang has a human-like face, long lips and a black body. It is covered with hair. It has reversed heels. It laughs when it sees a human being, and when it laughs its upper lip may cover its eyes. Guo Pu: In the Jiao and Guang regions and also in the mountains in Nankangjun, such creatures can be found. A big one may be as tall as 10 chi. It is colloquially called Shandu. In one of the years of the Xiaojian reign of the Song dynasty (960–1279), people from the indigenous areas contributed a pair of baboons to the emperor, one male and one female. The emperor asked Ding Luan, a representative from the tribe, about the animal. Ding Luan answered: "The face of the animal looks like a human being. It is covered with red hair like a macaque. It has a tail. It can talk like a human being, but it sounds like the chirping of a bird. It can predict life and death. It is very strong and can carry very heavy things. It has reversed heels and seems to have no knees. When it sleeps, it leans against something. When it catches a human being, it first laughs and then eats him. A hunter can catch the animal by using this trick. He puts one arm through a bamboo tube to lure the animal. When the animal laughs heartily, the person uses a nail to try to pin its lip to its forehead. Then the animal will run around wildly and die shortly afterwards. It has very long hair, which can be used to make wigs. Its blood can be added in the dyeing of boots or silk fabrics. If one drinks its blood, one will be able to see ghosts." After this explanation, the emperor ordered a painter to do a portrait of the animal. Li Shizhen: The book Fangyu Zhi: The baboon can also be found in the mountains in western Sichuan and Chuzhou. It is also called Renxiong. People catch it, and eat its paws and peel off its hide. In the You Mountains of Shaxian County in Fujian, the animal is also found. It is more than 10 chi tall and laughs when it encounters a human being. It is also called Shandaren, Yeren, or Shanxiao. The book Nankang Ji by Deng Deming: Shandu looks like a wild man from Kunlun Mountain. Its body is covered with hair. When it encounters a human being, it closes its eyes and opens its mouth, seeming to laugh. It turns stones in mountain streams to find crabs for food.

The Bencao gangmu supplement lists four other monkey-like creatures under feifei.

Shandu 山都, which Read identifies as the "chacma baboon, Cynocephalus porcarius":

Li Shizhen: The book Shuyi Ji [述異記] by Ren Fang: There is a kind of spirit in Nankang that is called Shandu. It looks like a human being and is just over two chi tall. It is black with red eyes and yellow hair. It makes its nest in a tree in the deep mountains. Its nest looks like bird nest over three chi tall. These nests are bright and lustrous inside, and are light and quite empty. Usually two such nests are placed together on a mattress made of bird feathers. The upper one is for the male and the lower one is for the female. Shandu may appear in different forms and can even become invisible. It is very difficult to find such a creature. It is similar to Muke and Shanxiao.

Shanhui 山𤟤:

Li Shizhen: The book Beishan Jing: Shanhui looks like a dog but has a human-like face. It is good at throwing stones. When it encounters a human being, it laughs. It runs as fast as the wind. When such a creature is sighted, there will be strong winds all over the country.

The Shanhaijing context describes the shanxiao 山魈 or shanhui 山𤟤.

There is an animal on this mountain which looks like a dog but it has a human face. It is good at throwing. When it sees a human being, it laughs. Its name is the mountain-monkey. It moves like the wind. Whenever it appears, there will be typhoons over all under the sky. (Yufa Mountain 獄法之山)

Muke 木客 "tree guest":

The book Nankang Ji: It is found in the mountains in the south. Its head and face are similar to those of a human being, and it talks like a human. But its paws have sharp claws. They live among steep cliffs and bury the dead like human beings. It can change things with human beings, but it does not show itself in front of human beings. Now there is a kind of ghost market in the south where such trades take place. There is also a creature called Mukeniao (a bird), which is recorded in the "Category of Fowls."

Shanxiao 山 [non-Unicode character with 犭radical and zao 喿 phonetic]: "The one footed mythological monster. Numerous beings are described in the [Shanhaijing]. It says that people cannot see it therefore it seems utter nonsense to write so much about it." [sic]. See the shanxiao 山魈.

=== Wei ===
Wei 蜼 "a monkey" is written with a character that combines the "insect radical" 虫 with a zhui 隹 phonetic. The etymology of wei < *wih or *ruiʔ (< *r-wiʔ) 蜼 "kind of monkey-like animal" is hypothetically connected with Palaung-Wa *rəyol "white-handed gibbon" or the -i in wei could be a diminutive suffix added to the you < *wu 猶 "monkey" word.

The Erya glosses, "The wei has an upturned nose and a long tail. It is good at climbing mountain peaks." (蜼卬鼻而長尾時善乘領). Guo Pu says, "The wei resembles the macaque but is larger. Its colour is yellowish-black, its tail several feet long, resembling an otter's tail, forked at the tip. Its nostrils are tilted upward; when it rains the wei hangs from a tree and covers its nostrils with its tail, or with two fingers. The people east of the (Yangtse) River catch and raise it. It is swift and strong." Based on this description, Van Gulik identifies wei as the golden snub-nosed monkey (Rhinopithecus roxellana), which is "a smaller monkey with a long tail, and a pronounced upturned nose; it has a blue-black face, and long, fluffy golden fur."

=== You ===
You 猶 "a monkey" has an uncertain etymology and meaning. Schuessler notes you < *ju < Proto-Chinese *wu 猶 "a kind of monkey" has comparative linguistics similarities with Proto-Tibeto-Burman *myuk or *mruk > Burmese myok and Mru yuk "monkey". You < *ju phonologically resembles two Old Chinese "monkey" words: yu < *ŋoh 禺 and hou < *gô 猴. The character猶, with the "quadruped radical" and a qiu 酋 phonetic, originally denoted a simian, but became a common Chinese phonetic loan character for you "still; yet".

The Erya glosses you as "Like a muntjac and good at climbing trees" (如麂善登木). Hao Yixing 郝懿行's 19th-century sub-commentary says, "The wild animal you is a kind of monkey, shaped like a muntjac, which resembles a hornless deer with feet like a dog." The you is also called youhu 猶猢 and identified as the husun 猢猻.

The Shuowen jiezi defines you as "a kind of jue "large monkey", you is also said to be the Longxi [modern Tianshui region] word for "puppy" (玃屬一曰隴西謂犬子為猷).

=== Du ===
Du 獨 (lit. "alone") named "a larger monkey", which was interpreted as a monkey with "solitary habits", based on the word's literal meaning. Read identifies it as "a species of baboon or mandrill".

The Bencao gangmu rong 狨 entry notes the du 獨.

Du looks like an ape but is bigger. It stays alone and gives a single cry at a time. It eats apes and monkeys. So there is an idiom saying that when a Du cries, all apes will disperse. The term "dufu" (獨夫, a lone man, or a "dictator.") has its origin in this animal. Some say this animal is actually the Huangyao [黄腰 "yellow waist"]. Also see explanations in the class of Hu (tiger).

The Bencao gangmu entry for hu 虎 "tiger" lists huangyao among animals that are strong enough to kill and eat tigers.

=== Guoran ===
Guoran

Guoran 果然 (lit. "indeed; really") or 猓然 is described as "a timid monkey with a long tail". Van Gulik tentatively associates guoran with the surili monkeys of the genus Presbytis found in Southeast Asia.

The Bencao gangmu entry for the Guoran 果然, which Read identifies as the "proboscis monkey, Nasalis larvatus", lists synonyms of Yu 禺, You 狖, Lei or Wei 蜼, and Xianhou 仙猴 "transcendent monkey".

Guo Pu: Guoran is an animal that cries in a way as if it is calling its own name. Luo Yuan (羅願): If one of them is caught, a whole group of them will cry and attack. Even when some are being killed, others will stay by. So it is called Guoran. The term means "assured," meaning when one is endangered, it can be assured that the others will come to its rescue. A big one is called Ran, or Yu. A small one is called You or Lei. People in the south call it Xianhou [仙猴]. Chen Cangqi [陳藏器]: The book Nanzhou Yiwu Zhi: In the area of Jiaozhou there is a kind of animal called Guoran. It is bigger than an ape. Its body is no more than three chi long, but its tail may rise above its head when erect. Its nostrils open upward. At times of rain, it will hang itself on a tree with its tail stuffed into its nostrils. Its hair is long, soft, fine and slippery. It is white with black stripes, resembling the colored feathers of a gray duck. Its hide and fur can be made into very warm fur coats and quilts. The book Er Ya recorded an animal with "upward nostrils and long tail," which is really this animal. Li Shizhen: Guoran is an animal that is kind. They are found in the mountains in the south-west. They live in trees. Guoran looks like an ape. It has a white face with black cheeks. It has a big moustache and multicolored hair. Its tail is long and forked at the tip. When it rains, Guoran stuffs the forked tips of its tail into its nostrils. They like to travel together, the aged ones in the front and the young ones at the back. When they find food, each gives the chance to others to eat first. They live together harmoniously and love each other dearly. When one is endangered, all the others will come to its rescue. As Liu Zongyuan [柳子] noted, it is an animal that is benevolent, polite, filial and kindhearted. In ancient times, the animal was painted as an image of politeness, filial piety and wisdom. However, it is an animal that is very suspicious. When they see a man coming they will climb up a tree and change positions many times. Sometimes they will run wildly, breaking their heads or legs. That is why people say that if a person is so suspicious, he can be compared to this animal.

This guoran heading has two subheadings.

Mengsong 蒙頌 or Menggui 蒙貴 (see below).

Chanhu 獑猢, which the Shuowen writes with the "rat radical" 鼠 as zhanhu shu 斬𪕮鼠, is described by Li Shizhen

It is a kind of Guoran. It is black with a white stripe on the waist like a belt. Its hands are covered with long white hair. They are held in a manner as if clutching a piece of board. The book Shudi Zhi [蜀地志]: The Canhu looks like a monkey. It moves very fast and stays in the trees all the time, jumping from one tree to another like a bird.

=== Mengsong ===
Mengsong 蒙頌 or menggui 蒙貴 (lit. "cover praise" or "cover expensive") "a dark monkey, a skillful rat-catcher" is an obscure ancient name. Read suggests mengsong was the "mongoose, Herpestidae mungo".

The Erya succinctly defines mengsong as "shaped like a [nao] monkey" (蒙頌猱狀). Since the Erya dictionary, which glosses words from the Chinese classics, has the oldest textual usage of mengsong. Guo Pu's commentary gives the synonym menggui and says, "An animal like a small [wei] proboscis monkey, purple black in color, from Yunnan (交趾 "Annam"). They are reared as rat catchers better than cats." Guo says these monkeys came from present-day central Vietnam, specifically Jiuzhen 九真 and Rinan 日南, modern Nghệ An Province and Quảng Bình Province.

The Tang author Duan Chengshi's (853) Miscellaneous Morsels from Youyang says, "Cats are also named menggui or wuyuan 烏員 [lit. "crow member"]."

The Bencao gangmu subsumes mengsong under the guoran "monkey" entry: "Mengsong is also called Menggui. It is small Guoran. Purple and black, it is found in Jiaozhi. It is raised in houses. It catches mice even better than a cat or a leopard."

== Taxonomy ==
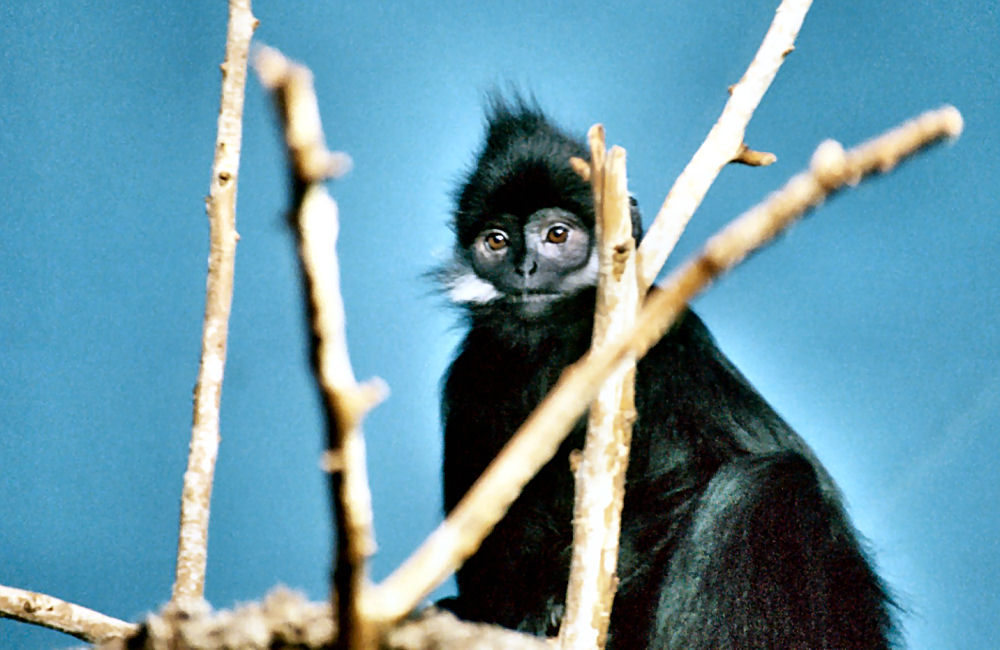
François' langur

The simians (higher primates) of China include two families of Old World monkeys (Cercopithecidae) and lesser apes or gibbons (Hylobatidae, lit. "wood walkers"), listed with modern Chinese nomenclature:

- Family: Cercopithecidae (舊大陸猴科)
  - Genus: Macaca (獼猴屬)
    - Stump-tailed macaque Macaca arctoides (短尾猴)
    - Assam macaque Macaca assamensis (熊猴,阿薩姆猴)
    - Rhesus macaque Macaca mulatta (馬騮)
    - Tibetan macaque Macaca thibetana (藏酋猴)
  - Genus: Semnopithecus (長尾葉猴屬)
    - Gray langur Semnopithecus entellus (灰葉猴)
  - Genus: Trachypithecus (烏葉猴屬)
    - François' langur Trachypithecus francoisi (黑葉猴)
    - Bonneted langur Trachypithecus pileatus (戴帽葉猴)
    - White-headed langur Trachypithecus poliocephalus (白頭葉猴)
  - Genus: Rhinopithecus (仰鼻猴屬)
    - Black snub-nosed monkey Rhinopithecus bieti (滇金絲猴)
    - Gray snub-nosed monkey Rhinopithecus brelichi (黔金絲猴)
    - Golden snub-nosed monkey Rhinopithecus roxellana (川金絲猴)
- Family: Hylobatidae (長臂猿科)
  - Genus: Bunopithecus (白眉長臂猿屬)
    - Hoolock gibbon Bunopithecus hoolock (白眉長臂猿)
  - Genus: Hylobates (長臂猿屬)
    - Lar gibbon Hylobates lar (白掌長臂猿)
  - Genus: Nomascus (黑冠長臂猿屬)
    - Black crested gibbon Nomascus concolor (白頰長臂猿)
    - White-cheeked crested gibbon Nomascus leucogenys (白胸長臂猿)
    - Eastern black crested gibbon Nomascus nasutus (東方黑冠長臂猿)

== Zodiac ==
The Monkey is the ninth of the twelve-year animal cycle in the "Chinese zodiac". The Year of the Monkey is associated with ninth Earthly Branch symbol shen 申 denoting the southwest direction and seventh lunar month. For example, one Year of the Monkey begins February 8, 2016.

== Mythology ==
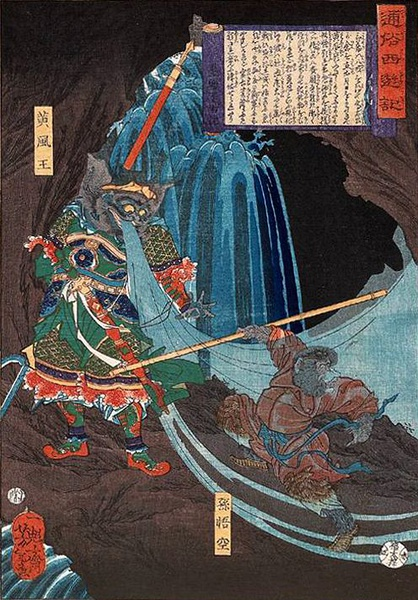
Sun Wukong fighting a wind demon.

Several mythical or semi-mythical monkeys are mentioned above in the Terminology section. Early texts treat the juefu 貜父 (cf. Japanese kakuen) as both a factual "large ape found in western mountains" and a mythological "single-sex species that abducts and mates with humans"; said to be either all males (viz. fu 父 "father") who rape women (Soushenji) or all females who rape men (Bencao gangmu, cf. xingxing). The early pictographs for nao 夒 "monkey" and kui 夔 "a legendary demon with a human face and body of a monkey/dragon" were nearly identical. Chinese legends say that foreign textiles used xingxing 猩猩 blood as a scarlet dye.

Many Chinese mythological creatures are said to resemble monkeys or apes. For instance, the xiao 囂 is described as "a long-armed ape" and the shanxiao 山魈 "mountain imp" supposedly had a human face and a monkey's body. The lake-dwelling shuihouzi 水猴子 "water monkey" is said to like drowning people.

Based on the data for the juefu, xingxing, and feifei, Van Gulik concluded that,

[E]ach of these three "monstrosities of the mountains" is a composite figure: a combination of two entirely different creatures, as observed by those ancient Chinese – hunters, travelers and soldiers – who ventured into the virgin mountain forests of the south-west. In the first place, glimpses caught of some larger simioid. In the case of the [feifei], the "human" face, long lips, and long red hair could apply to the orangutan. I leave it to zoologists to decide whether it is at all possible that two thousand years ago the habitat of the orangutan could have reached as far north as Indo-China. Second, Chinese impressions gathered during encounters with the aborigines. In this direction point the "nearly human speech", the pelting with stones, and the killing and/or abducting of man and women. Ever since during the Han dynasty the southwest was brought into the orbit of Chinese administration, these mountain tribes have succeeded in retaining their identity – even though Chinese rule was oppressive, and punitive expeditions against them launched as late as the end of the nineteenth century. Relations between the tribes and the Chinese were always uneasy, and Chinese tales about the aborigines often mention their killing and abducting Chinese citizens. The theory that [juefu], [xingxing], and [feifei] are the combined result of such observations is also supported by the fact that in the oldest pictures preserved, the human features prevail over the simian.

Like the Indian monkey-god Hanuman in Hindu mythology, Chinese deities sometimes appear in the guise of monkeys. The best-known of these is Sun Wukong, the main protagonist in Wu Cheng'en's picaresque novel Journey to the West, also known as Monkey. In the southern regions of China, many temples were built to the monkey-god who is worshipped as the Qitian dasheng 齊天大聖 "great saint equal to heaven", which was a name of Sun Wukong.

Wolfram Eberhard explains, "It is not only in Indian mythology that the monkey plays a leading part; it is also found in South Chinese and in Tibetan legend. Several varieties of monkey are native to South China; and according to one Tibetan myth, the Tibetan people are descended from a monkey", namely Pha Trelgen Changchup Sempa. "Tales of women who have been abducted and ravished by monkeys and who have then given birth to children, are common in South China, and several Chinese 'clans' attribute their origins to such a union." Eberhard calls Yang 楊 the "Monkey Clan", citing the totemistic myth recorded in the Soushenji and Fayuan Zhulin that the Yangs living in southwestern Shu (state) (modern Sichuan) were descendants of monkeys. The Soushenji (12) "reported that in the southwest of Shu there were monkey-like animals whose names were [jiaguo 猳國], [mahua 馬化], or [jueyuan 玃猿, see "Jue and Juefu"]. These animals abducted women and sent them back when they became pregnant. If the baby were not accepted, the woman would have to die. Therefore these children were raised and they received the clan name Yang. For this reason this clan occurred quite frequently in Southwest Shu."

According to orally transmitted accounts collected from the Miao ethnic group of China, at first there were no people, but rather the ancestors of modern humans were monkeys. One day the monkeys went to play in a cave, where a divine dragon resided. The dragon blew upon the monkeys its divine breath, which caused them to be transformed into modern human beings.

== Religious significance ==
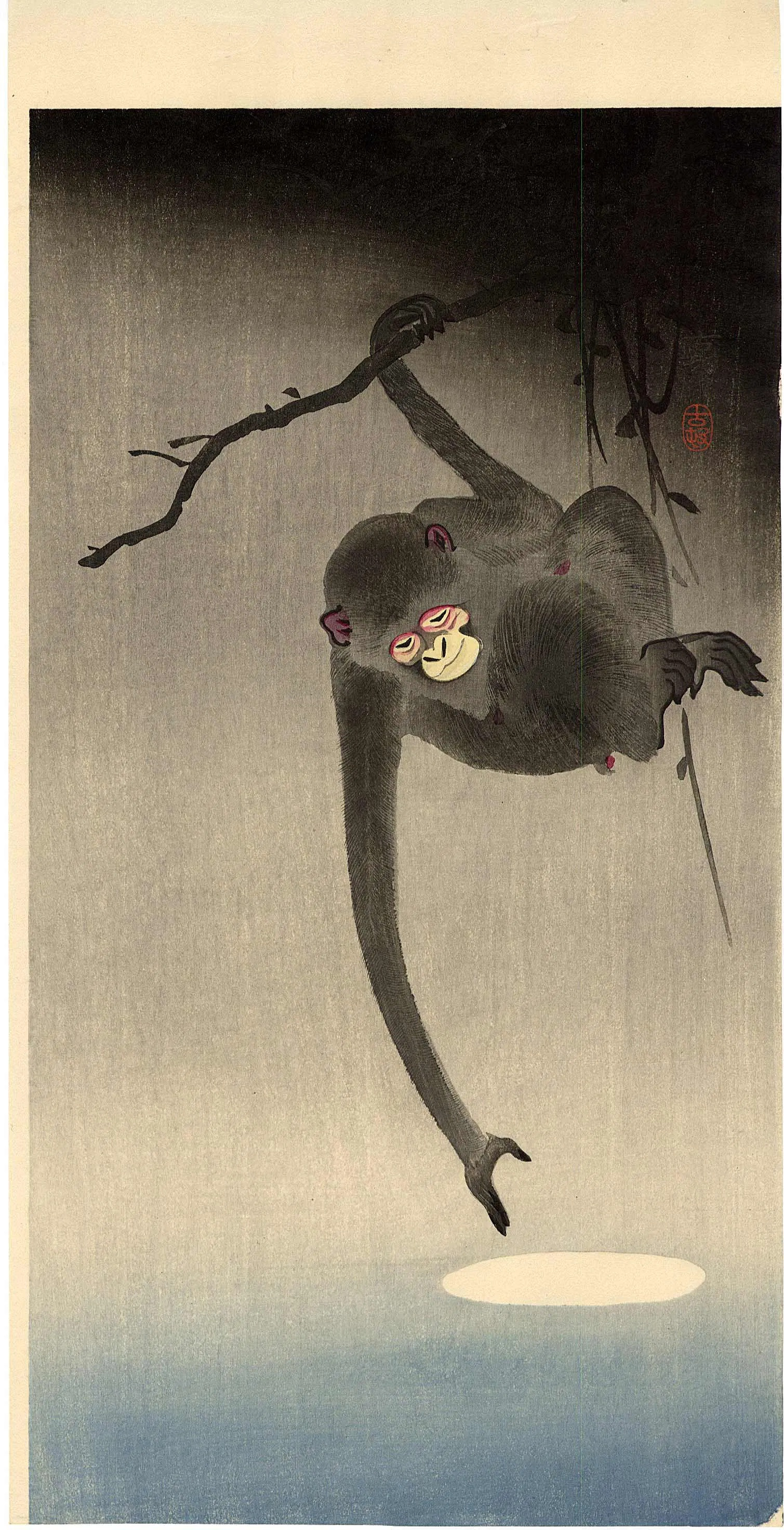
Gibbon reaching for the moon's reflection, Ohara Koson, 1926.

Chinese religions use monkeys and apes as metaphors for people. In Chinese folk religion, some shape-shifting monkeys were said to be human ancestors. In Daoism, monkeys, particularly gibbons, were believed have longevity like a xian "transcendent; immortal". In Chinese Buddhism, on the one hand, monkeys symbolized restless and foolish humans, and on the other hand, Gautama Buddha was supposedly a benevolent monkey king in an earlier incarnation.

=== Folk religion ===
Chinese traditional folk religion regards monkeys as supernatural beings. Eberhard cites early reports that monkeys "could talk", "knew the past", and "were like men".

Jan Jakob Maria de Groot's classic study of Chinese religions distinguishes "monkey demons" and "were-monkeys", both of which could shape shift between a monkey and a human. While a monkey demon "often acts as a dangerous devil" (frequently transforming in order to have sex with a human), a were-monkey was usually virtuous (e.g., the monkey who takes human shape in order to become a Buddhist monk, Xuanshizhi 宣室志).

"Monkey demons" could assume both male and female forms. De Groot describes them as either "a lewd fornicator of wives and maids" or "a seductress, in beautiful female forms, of adults and inexperienced youths, whose senses it bewitches at the detriment of their health". For instance, the (4th century) In Search of the Supernatural records a monkey-demon story from the era of Emperor Xiaowu of Jin.

In the [Taiyuan] period (376–396) of the [Jin] dynasty they kept a monkey in the back palace of [Dizhao 昭翟], prince of [Dingling], in front of the chambers of his concubines. These women once upon a time simultaneously got in the family way, and each of them gave birth to three children that danced and hopped while discharging from the bowels. [Zhao] thus being convinced that the monkey was the culprit, killed the beast and the children; which made the women burst out all at once into wailing. He interrogated them, and they avowed they had seen a young man dressed with a yellow silk robe and a white gauze cap, a most lovely personage, jesting and chatting quite like a man.

Legends about monkey-human interbreeding are common, as noted above Jue ape-men copulate with women and Zhou monkey-women copulate with men.

The Youyang zazu tells a legend that the Chinese peoples were descendants of simians: "a monkey married the female servant of a daughter of heaven and thus became ancestor of the [Ji]; another monkey also married the servant of a daughter of heaven and became founder of the [Cheng]" – using Ji 姬 (lit. "imperial concubine") as "a general term for southern peoples" and Cheng 傖 (or cang 傖 "coarse; vulgar") as "an insulting word for North Chinese who had migrated to the south".

The Baopuzi lists ways to protect oneself from mountain demons associated with different astronomical days (chap. 17), including "On a day shen [申 "Monkey"], a man calling himself a lord is a monkey [猴]; a [day jiuqing 九卿], an ape [猿]."

"Were-monkeys" (named in analogy with werewolf) were frequently older monkeys that transformed into humans. The (c. 1st century) Wu Yue Chunqiu tells a story about King Goujian of Yue (r. 496–465 BCE) wanting to improve his army's military skill. One of his ministers suggested:

I have recently heard about a virgin girl in [Yue] who has come from the southern forest. The people of that country praise her (martial skill). I request you to summon her, and grant her an interview at once." The king of [Yue] sent envoys to summon her to be questioned about the art of fighting with sword and halberd. When the virgin set out for the north for an audience with the king; she met on her way an old man. He said his name was Mr. [Yuan] and addressed her "I have heard that you are skilled in swordsmanship, I wish you would show me!" The girl replied "Your handmaid would not dare to conceal anything from you. You just test me!" Thereupon Mr. [Yuan] swept his walking staff over a cluster of bamboo trees, and (in that one sweep) laid all the twigs and branches bare. Before the falling leaves had reached the ground, however, the girl had caught them all (on her sword), Mr. [Yuan] then flew up into a tree, and changed into a white gibbon.

Mr. Yuan is named Yuan Gong 袁公, a wordplay upon yuan 猿 "gibbon; monkey". Noting that this "monkey-man" called himself a member of the Yuan 袁 ("monkey") clan, De Groot says, "In subsequent ages it continues a feature of monkey-myth to represent were-monkeys as persons bearing that tribal name, just as man-foxes were … often believed to be members of the Hu tribe."—referring to the pun between hu 狐 "fox" and the Hu 胡 ("barbarian") clan.

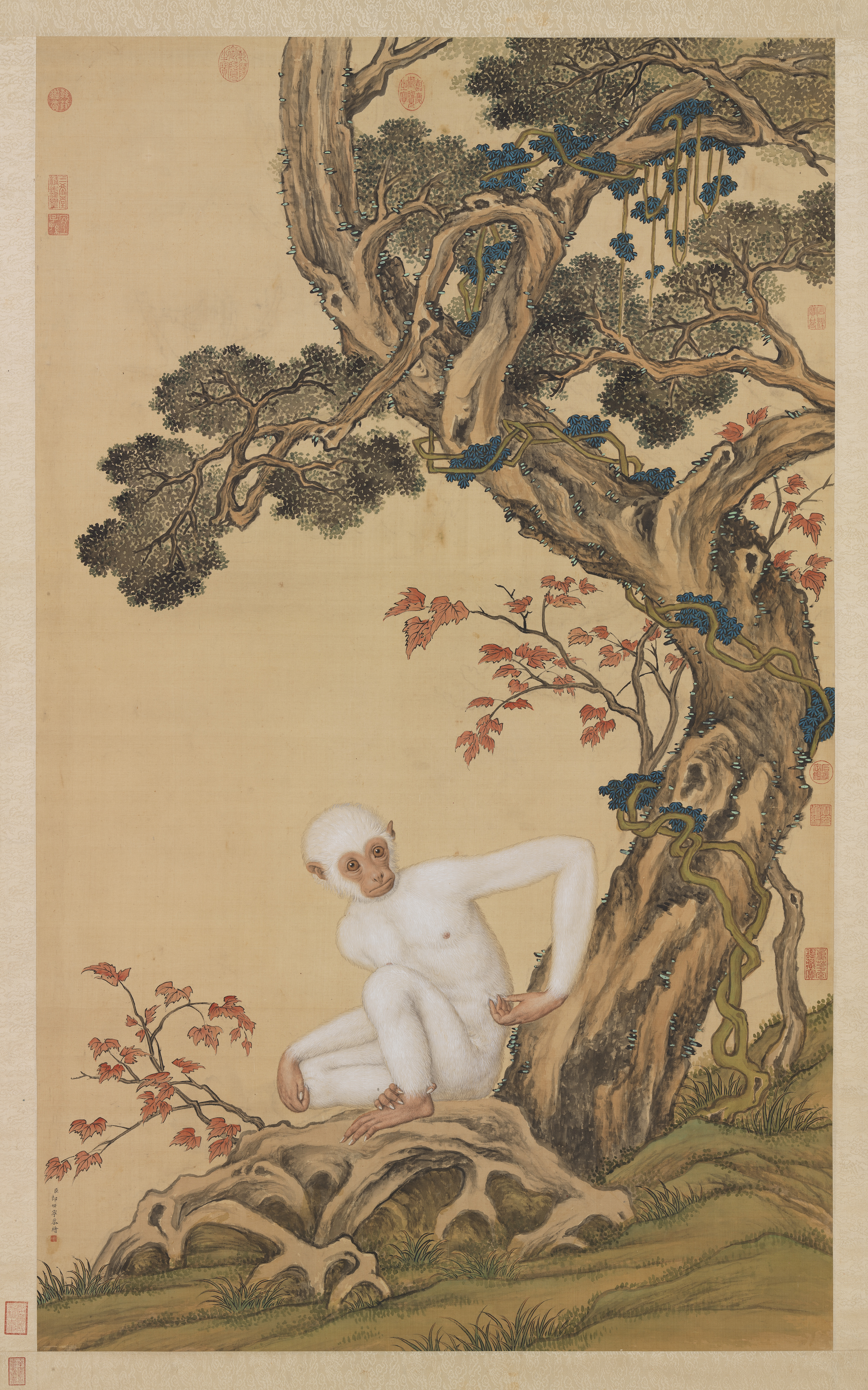
Baiyuan "White Gibbon" painting by Jesuit lay brother Giuseppe Castiglione, 18th century

Baiyuan 白猨 "white gibbons" like "Mr. Yuan" were considered to be spiritually powerful. The (c. 239 BCE) Lüshi Chunqiu has a "knack story" about the legendary archer Yang Youji 養由基 and a shen baiyuan "supernatural white gibbon" that instinctively knew the intentions of humans.

Yang Youji and Yin Ru were both men of highly refined skills. In the courtyard of the palace of Chu there was a magical white ape, which even the best archers could not hit, and so the king of Chu asked Yang Youji to try. Yang Youji picked up his bow and arrows and went to try. Before shooting, he had already pinned it with his arrows; with a single shot, the ape fell. Thus, Yang Youji had the ability to hit his target before actually hitting his target. (chap. 24)

The (121 BCE) Huainanzi tells a simpler version of this story.

The king of Chu had a white ape. When the king himself shot at it, the ape grabbed his arrows to show off. He ordered Yang Youji to shoot it. When [Yang] began to draw the bow and aim the arrow, [even] before he shot, the ape hugged a tree and shrieked. This is hitting the target before hitting the target. (16)

=== Daoism ===
Daoism, like Buddhism, treats monkeys as both foolish and wise animals.

The (c. 4th–3rd centuries BCE) Daoist Zhuangzi illustrates the gibbon/macaque distinction (see Symbolism section). The first story is about a jugong 狙公 "macaque/monkey trainer".

To weary the spiritual intelligence by trying to unify things without knowing that they are already identical is called "three in the morning." Why is this called "three in the morning"? Once upon a time, there was a monkey keeper who was feeding little chestnuts to his charges. "I'll give you three in the morning and four in the evening," he told them. All the monkeys were angry. "All right, then," said the keeper, "I'll give you four in the morning and three in the evening." All the monkeys were happy with this arrangement. Without adversely affecting either the name or the reality of the amount that he fed them, the keeper acted in accordance with the feelings of the monkeys. He too recognized the mutual dependence of "this" and "that." Consequently, the sage harmonizes the right and wrong of things and rests at the center of the celestial potter's wheel. This is called "dual procession." (chap. 2)

Zhuangzi tells a yuan 猿 "gibbon" parable to the King of Wei.

Master Chuang passed by the King of Wei wearing patched clothing made of coarse cloth and shoes tied together with twine. "How come you're so wretched, master?" asked the King of Wei. "It's poverty," said Master Chuang, "not wretchedness. When a scholar possesses the Way and integrity but cannot put them into practice, he is wretched. When his clothing is tattered and his shoes have holes in them, he is poor, not wretched. This is called, 'not having met with the right time': Has your majesty not seen the high-climbing gibbon? When it is on a nanmu, catalpa, or camphor tree [all tall, straight trees], the gibbon grasps the branches with its hands and feet or wraps around them with its tail, moving nimbly among them. Even Yi and P'engmeng [the famous mythical archers Houyi and his disciple] would not be able to take accurate aim at it. When, however, the gibbon is on a silkworm thorn, ramosissimus, thorny limebush, or matrimony vine [all short, thorny bushes], it moves furtively and glances sideways, shaking and trembling all the while. This is not because the gibbon's sinews and bones have become stiff and lost their suppleness, but because it finds itself in an inconvenient situation and cannot show off its ability. Now, if I am situated under a benighted ruler and confused ministers, and still wish not to be wretched, how could I be so?" (20)

The Daoist discipline of daoyin "guide and pull" is based on the notion that circulating and absorbing qi "breath; life force" in the body can lead to longevity or even immortality. Long-limbed animals were believed to be innately adept at absorbing qi and thus acquire "occult powers, including the ability to assume human shape, and to prolong their life to several hundred years". For example, the (c. 4th century) Chunqiu Fanlu says, "The gibbon resembles the macaque, but he is larger, and his colour is black. His forearms being long, he lives eight hundred years, because he is expert in controlling his breathing."

The Baopuzi lists animals associated with longevity, including (chap. 3), "A macaque may evolve into an ape after 800 years. After another 500 years it evolves into Jue, and Jue will evolve into Chanchu (toad) after 1,000 years."

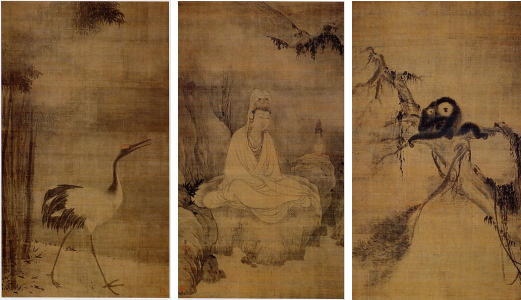
Guanyin, gibbon, and crane scrolls, Muqi Fachang, 13th century

Another animal associated with longevity was the he 鶴 "crane", whose long neck and legs supposedly enabled the bird to absorb qi and live up to a thousand years. The pair of yuanhe 猿鶴 "gibbon and crane", both of which were famous for their graceful movements, became a literary and artistic trope for a "long life". The (624) Yiwen Leiju encyclopedia quotes a Baopuzi story, not found in the received text, about King Mu of Zhou (r. 976–922 BCE). "When King Mu of the [Zhou] dynasty made his expedition to the south, his entire (routed) army was transformed. The "gentlemen" [君子] among his troops changed into gibbons or cranes, the "small men" [小人] into insects or grains of sand.", noting that this widely quoted passage "sets up the gibbon as the gentleman among the primates – a position he has kept till the present day."

=== Buddhism ===
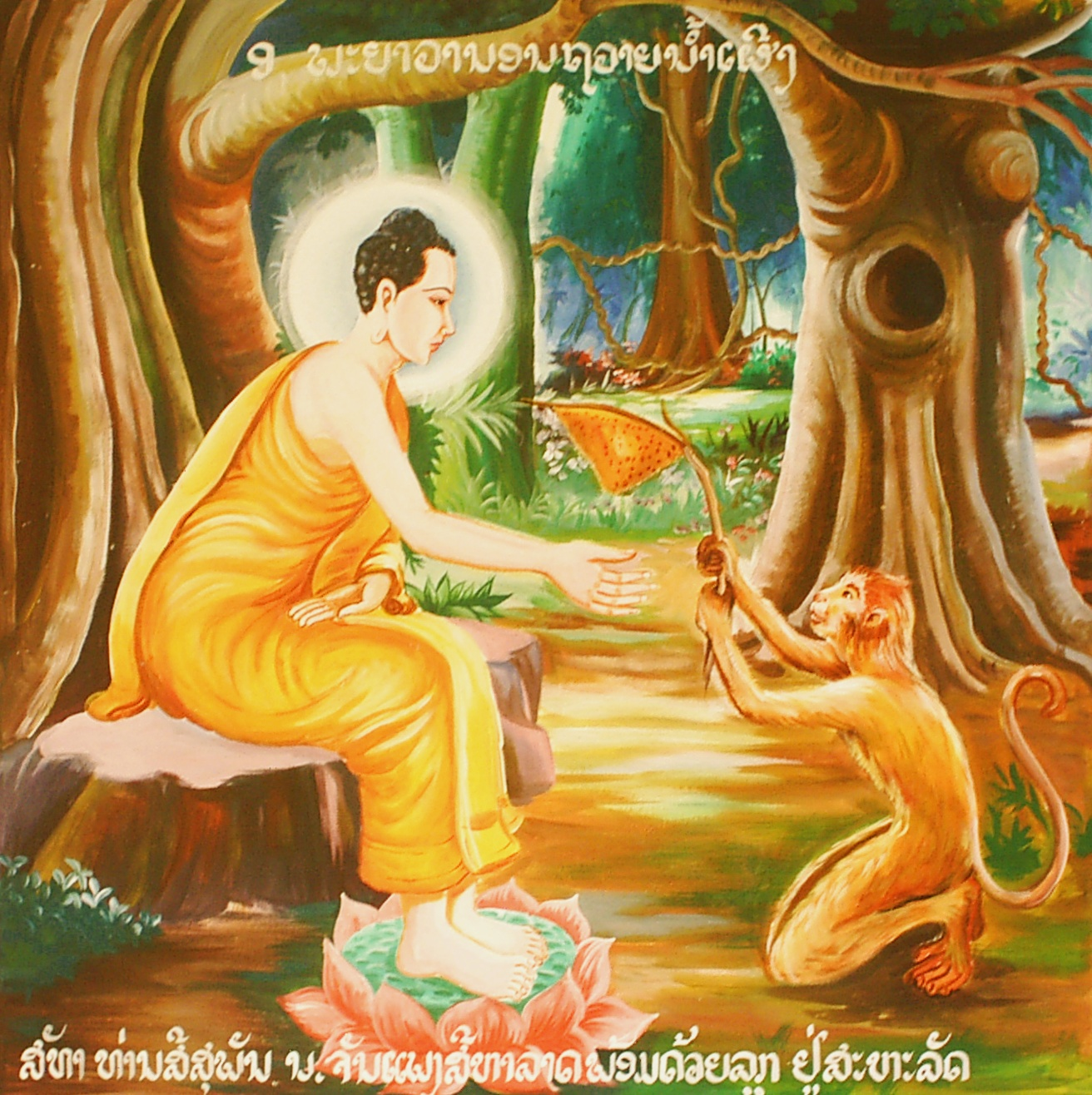
A monkey offering honey to help feed the Buddha.

When Buddhism was first transmitted into China circa the 2nd century CE, monkeys were already an ancient tradition in Buddhist texts.

Sutras frequently quote the Buddha to use "monkey" similes. The Dhammapada (334) says: "The craving of a person given to heedless living grows like a creeper. Like the monkey seeking fruits in the forest, he leaps from life to life (tasting the fruits of his kamma)." The Samyutta Nikaya (12.61) says: "Just as a monkey roaming through a forest grabs hold of one branch, lets that go and grabs another, then lets that go and grabs still another, so too that which is called 'mind' and 'mentality' and 'consciousness' arises as one thing and ceases as another by day and by night."

Several of the Jataka tales describe the Buddha's past lives as a monkey or an ape (see the Four harmonious animals). For example, the Mahakapi Jataka or Great Monkey King.

In the heart of a Himavat there was a large tree, which bore excellent fruits even bigger than the palmyra nuts having exceedingly sweet flavor; lovely hue and fragrance, which no man had ever seen or noticed before. This tree was also the abode of several monkeys; and the Bodhisatta was born as the king of those monkeys. He was much larger in size than his followers; and was more compassionate and virtuous than others. One day, the monkey king noticed that a branch of the tree had grown just over the stream. It alarmed him, because some of the fruits might drop in the stream, which then might get carried away to the man’s world; and the men would then certainly come to have all the fruits for themselves. So, he instructed the monkeys not to let any fruit grow on that branch if they wished to enjoy the fruits for a longer period. … [However, one piece of fruit fell and floated downstream, where it came into the hands of a king who] tasted it, and then remarked, "Nothing could surpass the flavor of this fruit". He then ordered his men to hunt for the tree in and around the river-bank which bore the fruit. Soon the king’s men found out the tree laden with such luscious and delicious fruits. When they saw the monkeys enjoying those fruits, which their king wanted to have so eagerly, they attacked the monkeys mercilessly with volleys of arrows. Witnessing the approaching attacking royal soldiers the Bodhisatta jumped on a mountain peak, which the other monkeys were not likely to copy. There, in order to save his friends he seized a strong rooted tall cane with his legs and bending it towards the tree jumped back and caught hold of the branch of the tree. He then called upon the other monkeys to use him as a bridge to jump upon the mountain peak. Taking advantage of the situation all the monkeys jumped on the mountain and darted away quickly. The monkey king was, however, terribly bruised and injured by being trampled by his mates when acting as a bridge for them. Soon he swooned. The king watched the flight of the monkeys; and also the plight of the monkey king. He was greatly moved by the exemplification of such insight; courage; valor; and sacrifice, which an animal had just displayed to save the lives of his subjects. The king then ordered his men to delicately bring down the unconscious ape and gently place him on a couch and to render the best possible first aid. When the great monkey regained his consciousness the king asked him to explain as to why did he endangered his life to save his subjects, who were rather meant to serve or sacrifice. Like a guru, he then said, "O King! Verily my body is broken but my mind is still sound; I uplifted only those over whom I exercised my royal powers for so long." And before the king could utter some words of praise for the great monkey; he found him dead.

Chinese Buddhists adapted and expanded upon these traditional "monkey" metaphors for human qualities. A famous Chan Buddhist example is the Chinese xinyuan "mind monkey", which is a Buddhist psychological metaphor describing "unsettled; restless; inconstant" mentality. The word xinyuan 心猿 "heart-/mind-monkey" is frequently combined with yima 意馬 "thought-/will-horse" in the four character idiom xinyuan yima or yima xinyuan, reflecting the previously mentioned association between monkeys and horses (and a major motif in the Journey to the West).

== Literature ==
Monkeys are a traditional theme in Chinese literature. Besides the prominent "Monkey King" Sun Wukong mentioned above, gibbons and macaques are popular images in Chinese poetry. Van Gulik says nearly every Chinese poet who wrote from the 3rd to 7th centuries referred to the "graceful movements of the gibbon and his saddening calls". For instance, the Tang poet Li Bai wrote poems about gibbons 白猿 in the Qiupu 秋浦 region (in south-central modern Anhui Province).

In [Qiupu] there are many white gibbons,
Swirling through the trees as so many snow flakes.
Pulling their young with them along the thin branches,
Drinking they play with the reflected moon in the water.

A modern example is Robert van Gulik's Judge Dee story "The Morning of the Monkey", published in The Monkey and the Tiger.

== Symbolism ==
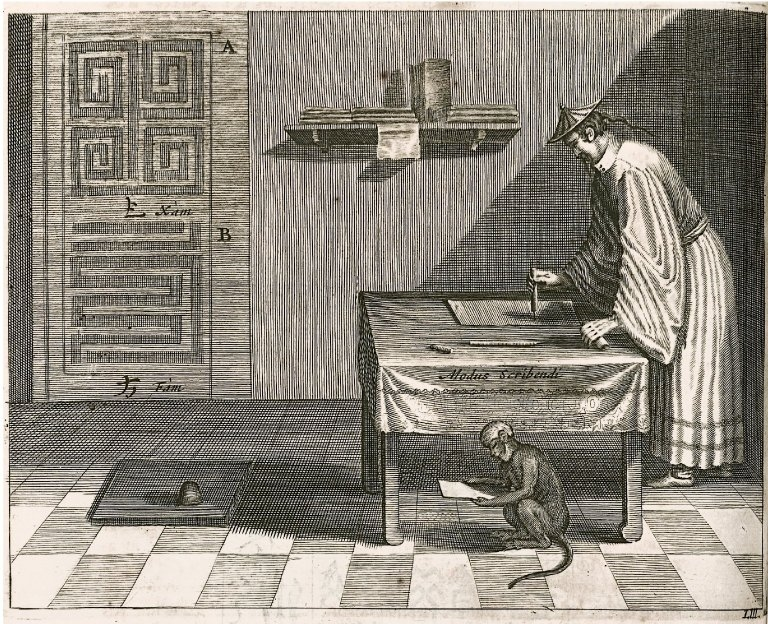
Method of Writing, a scribe with an ink brush and a monkey with paper, from Athanasius Kircher's 1667 China Illustrata

Reflecting the simial likenesses among humans, monkeys, and apes, many languages symbolically use "monkey; ape" words in reference to people. English monkey, for instance, can mean a "mischievous child", "person with minimal intelligence and/or bad looks", or "menial employee who does a repetitive job"; and ape can mean "uncivilized person", "wild; crazy", or "imitate; mimic". Compare the Chinese words houzi 猴子 "monkey; mischievous/glib person", hour 猴儿 "monkey; endearing term for a child", and houjing 猴精 "monkey spirit; clever and roguish person".

Zhou dynasty culture symbolically contrasted the gibbon as "gentleman; sage" (junzi 君子 or sheng 聖) and the macaque as "commoner; petty person" (xiaoren 小人).

A sharp distinction was drawn … between the superior gibbon and the inferior macaque. The macaque, frequently coming down to inhabited areas to forage, and therefore often seen and easily caught, became a familiar sight in daily life. Trained macaques formed part of the performances of travelling showmen, amusing young and old alike by their clever tricks. The gibbon, on the contrary, inhabiting as it did the upper canopy of the primeval forest, rarely seen and extremely difficult to catch, was regarded as a denizen of the inscrutable, forbidding world of the high mountains and deep valleys, peopled by fairies and goblins. Accordingly, the macaque was the symbol of human astute trickery but also of human credulity and general foolishness; and the gibbon the symbol of the world of the supernatural, mysterious and remote from man's daily life.

See the Zhuangzi stories (under "Daoism").

Eberhard describes a traditional Chinese literary motif that monkeys will sometimes seduce and impregnate women, who give birth to either a monkey-child or a monkey spirit. Thus, in the "popular mind", says Eberhard, a monkey can also symbolize an adulterer.

== Art ==
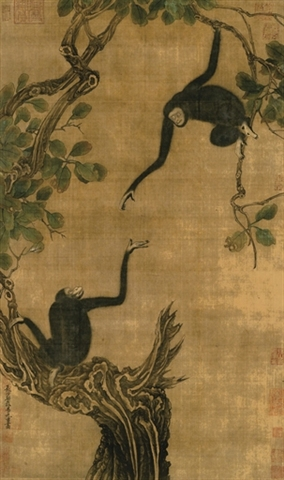
Two gibbons in an oak tree by the Song dynasty painter Yi Yuanji.

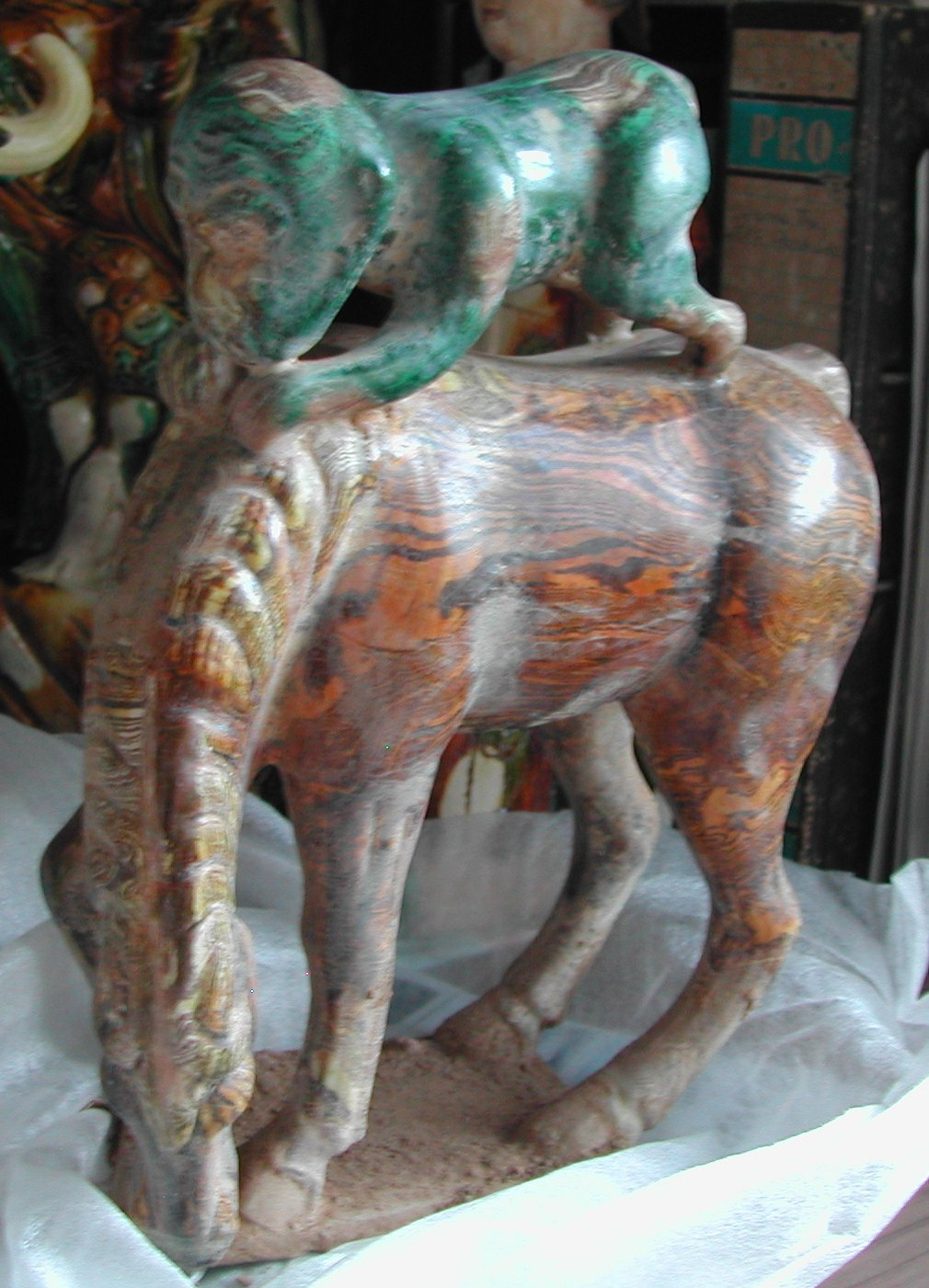
Tri-Color Glazed figure of a monkey riding a horse, Tang dynasty.

The earliest Chinese monkey-shaped objects, believed to have been belt hooks, date from the late Eastern Zhou period (4th–3rd centuries BCE) and depict a gibbon with outstretched arms and hook-shaped hands. The oldest extant painting of a monkey is attributed to the Buddhist monk and artist Guanxiu (832–912). It shows a gibbon offering peaches to a Luohan 羅漢 "arhat", which says "firmly establishes this painting in a Buddhistic context".

Gibbons became a popular subject for Chinese painters (for example, Yi Yuanji, fl. 1050–1075) during the Northern Song dynasty, and then again from the Southern Song dynasty into the Yuan dynasty, especially for the Chan Buddhist monk Muqi Fachang (1210?–1269?).

Monkeys are a frequent motif in modern Chinese art. Several examples are based on a visual pun between hou 侯 "marquis; count" and hou 猴 "monkey". Since mashang 馬上 literally means "on horseback" or figuratively "immediately", an image of a monkey riding a horse is called mashang fenghou馬上封侯 "May you immediately be conferred the rank of marquis", which is a Chinese gift of congratulations for gaining promotion. Another visual pun showing one monkey crouching on the bei 背 "back" of another bei 辈 "generation" can be interpreted as "May you rank as marquis from generation to generation"; and a painting of two monkeys in a tree has the same signification.

Another frequent image is a monkey holding a peach, as in the 16th-century novel Fengshen Yanyi, which refers to a legend that a monkey stole the peaches of Immortality from the garden of Xi Wangmu "Queen Mother of the West".

The familiar three wise monkeys are a Japanese, rather than Chinese, pictorial maxim to "see no evil, hear no evil, speak no evil". See Monkeys in Japanese culture for more information.

== Pharmacology ==
Simians have played a role in traditional Chinese medicine, "which maintains that the meat, bones and livers of monkeys have various curative effects, ranging from detoxification to improving sex drive". Chinese state-owned medicine companies buy about 2 tons of monkey bones annually, estimated as "taken from at least 1,500 primates."

The (1597) Bencao gangmu lists pharmacological uses for four monkeys. The mihou "monkey; macaque" is the most versatile.

- rou 肉 "meat": "Pickled in wine it is good for chronic malaria, and all kinds of lassitude. It is prophylactic against malaria. In the south it is considered a delicacy smoked or salted."
- tougu 頭骨 "skull": "Ashed and given with wine for malaria. Boiled in water it is used as a bath for children in convulsions, and for feverish chills."
- shou 手 "paw": "For children in convulsions."
- shi 屎 "feces": "Applied to spider bites. Ashed and given with honey to children in convulsions, and for colic."
- pi 皮 "skin": "To treat infectious diseases in horses. A female monkey kept in the stable of a horse is most effective. The menstrual fluid [houjing 猴經] shed on to the straw is eaten by the horse and the latter gets a lasting immunity against infectious disease."

The meat and blood of a rong 狨 "gibbon" are used for anal fistula, and the fat for scabies. Read notes "The placenta, liver, and bile of the gibbon are used in Japanese Domestic medicine." The meat of a guoran 果然 monkey is prescribed for malaria and chills. The meat of a xingxing 猩猩 monkey supposedly "cures drowsiness and hunger, and desire for a cereal diet, it allows an exhausted man to travel well, and old age will not tell on him". This refers to the Daoist bigu "avoiding grains" fasting technique associated with achieving xian "transcendence; immortality".

== Cuisine ==
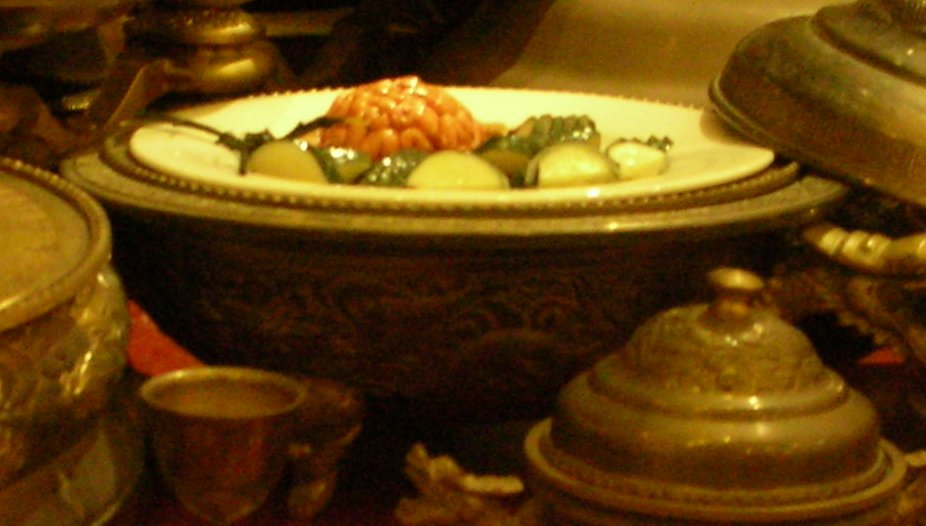
Simulated monkey brains displayed at the Tao Heung Foods of Mankind Museum as part of a Manchu Han Imperial Feast

Monkey meat, as mentioned above in the Bencao gangmu, was traditionally considered both a medicine and a delicacy in Chinese cuisine.

Several Chinese classics record the practice. The Lüshi chunqiu lists roast "lips of the xingxing ape" among the five finest meats. The Yiwuzhi records a "special soup made of monkey head was typical for southern peoples." The Huainanzi (19) has a story about eating monkeys: "A man from Chu had some boiled monkey meat that he gave to his neighbors. They thought it was dog meat and found its flavor pleasing. Later, when they heard it was monkey, they knelt down and vomited all they had eaten. This was a case of not even beginning to know about flavor."

Eating monkey brains, hounao 猴腦, is a controversial practice. Qing emperors ate monkey brains during feasts known as the Manchu Han Imperial banquet. According to Stephen Chen, the son of chef Joyce Chen, Qing emperors "were partial to scooping out the brain of a living monkey for a tasty treat, and the practice continues to this day, particularly in some southern provinces".

Modern day official Chinese policy with regards to the procurement of certain monkeys for food makes their consumption illegal, with sentences of up to 10 years in prison for violators.

== Martial arts ==
Monkey Kung Fu, or houquan 猴拳 "Monkey Fist", refers to several Chinese martial arts techniques utilizing monkey-like movements. Modern Chinese movies have popularized the Drunken Monkey style.

The monkey is a secondary animal style, besides the basic Five Animals, or wuxing 五形 "Five Forms", of Tiger, Crane, Leopard, Snake, and Dragon.

The Huainanzi (7) criticized yogic practices like the yuanjue 蝯躩 "gibbon leap": "If you huff and puff, exhale and inhale, blow out the old and pull in the new, practice the Bear Hang, the Bird Stretch, the Duck Splash, the Ape Leap, the Owl Gaze, and the Tiger Stare: This is what is practiced by those who nurture the body. They are not the practices of those who polish the mind [e.g., the Perfected]."

== Pets ==
The history of pet monkeys in China goes back at least to the Spring and Autumn period (771–476 BCE).

The scholar Robert van Gulik, who was a great fancier of gibbons, wrote, "there is only one objection to keeping a gibbon as pet, namely that one is liable to become too fond of it, and cannot bear to part after one's pet has reached maturity."

The Huainanzi (2) mentions caging a gibbon, "If you put an ape in a cage, it will be just like a pig. It is not that it is no longer clever or agile but that it has nowhere to give free rein to its ability." The text (16) also mentions a beloved pet gibbon, "The king of Chu lost his [pet] ape, and [to recapture it] he destroyed every tree in the forest." This was likely King Gong of Chu (r. 590–560 BCE) who is identified with a related story (16.89), concerning "The king of Chu had a white ape" that could catch arrows shot by archers.

== Other ==
Traditional Chinese holidays include the Monkey King Festival celebrated on the 16th day of the 8th lunar month, and the Birthday of the Monkey God, celebrated in Singapore on the 16th day of the 1st lunar month.

Nanwan Monkey Island is a nature reserve in Hainan, China.

"Monkey" is also a popular name for foodstuffs including Chinese teas:

- Baimao Hou 白毛猴 "white-haired monkey" is a type of green tea originating from the Wuyi Mountains in Fujian Province
- Houkui tea 猴魁 "monkey chief" is a type of green tea originating from Taiping County in Anhui Province
- Golden Monkey tea or jinhou cha 金猴茶 is a type of black tea originating from the Fujian and Yunnan Provinces

== See also ==
- "Autumn Day in Kui Prefecture", a poem by Du Fu mentioning macaque monkeys hanging in chains.
- Monkeys in Japanese culture
- Simians (Chinese poetry)
- Vanara, monkey-like humanoids in the Ramayana

== Gallery ==
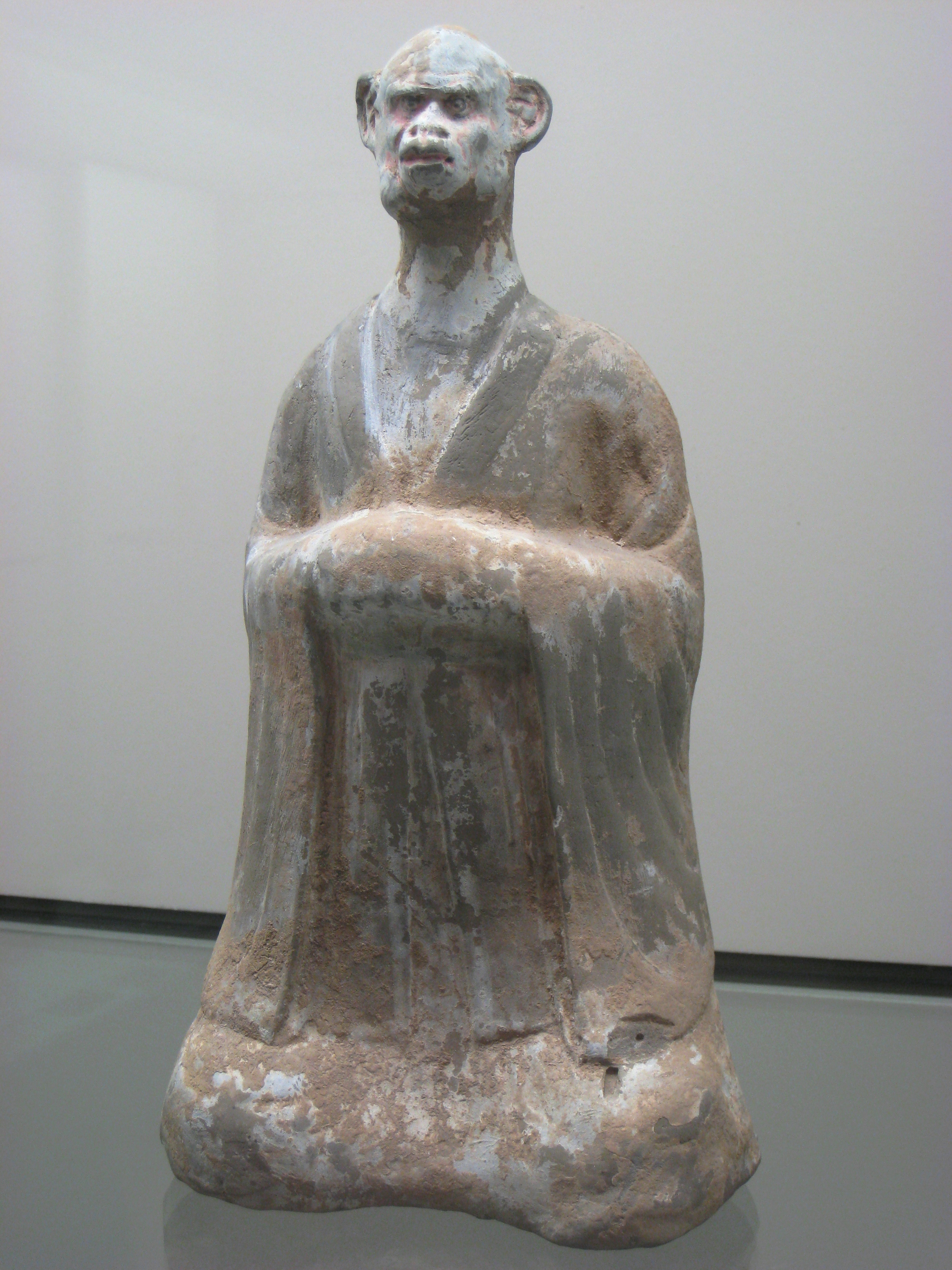
Monkey figurine, Musée Cernuschi

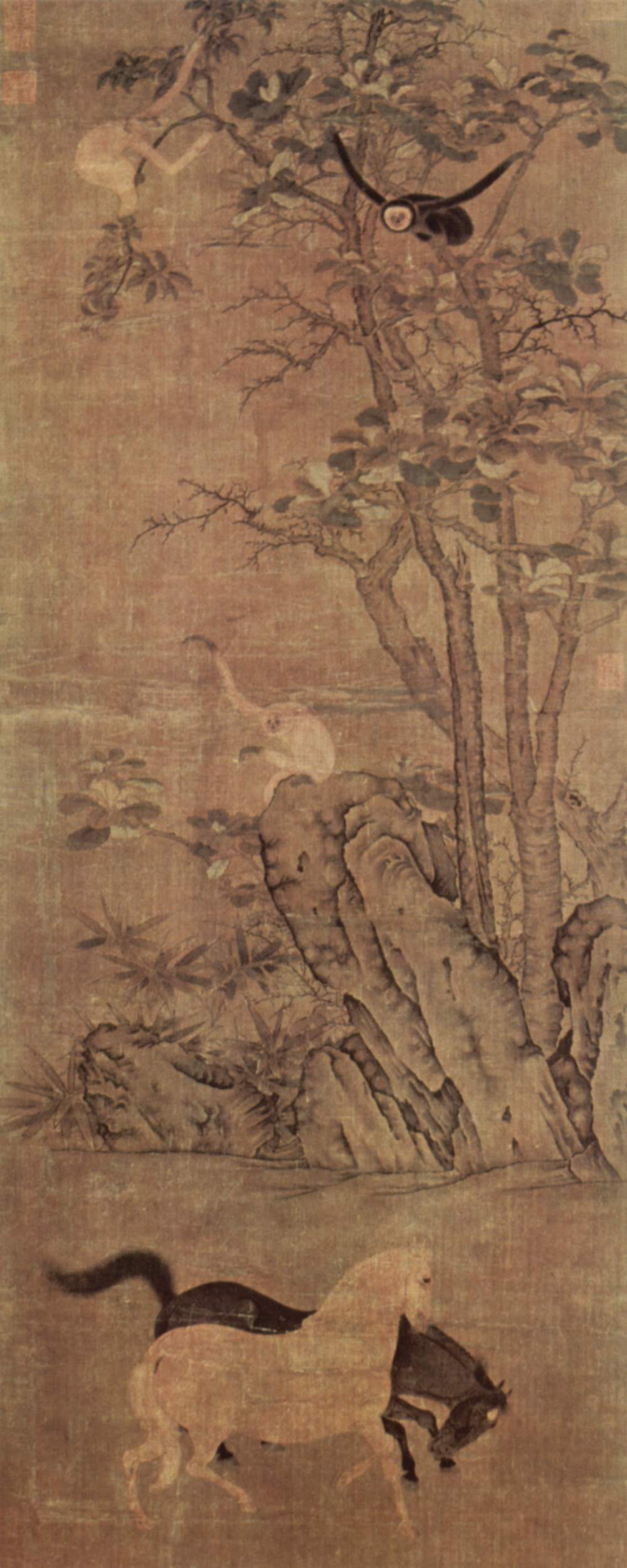
Gibbons and Horses, 10th-century Song dynasty painting

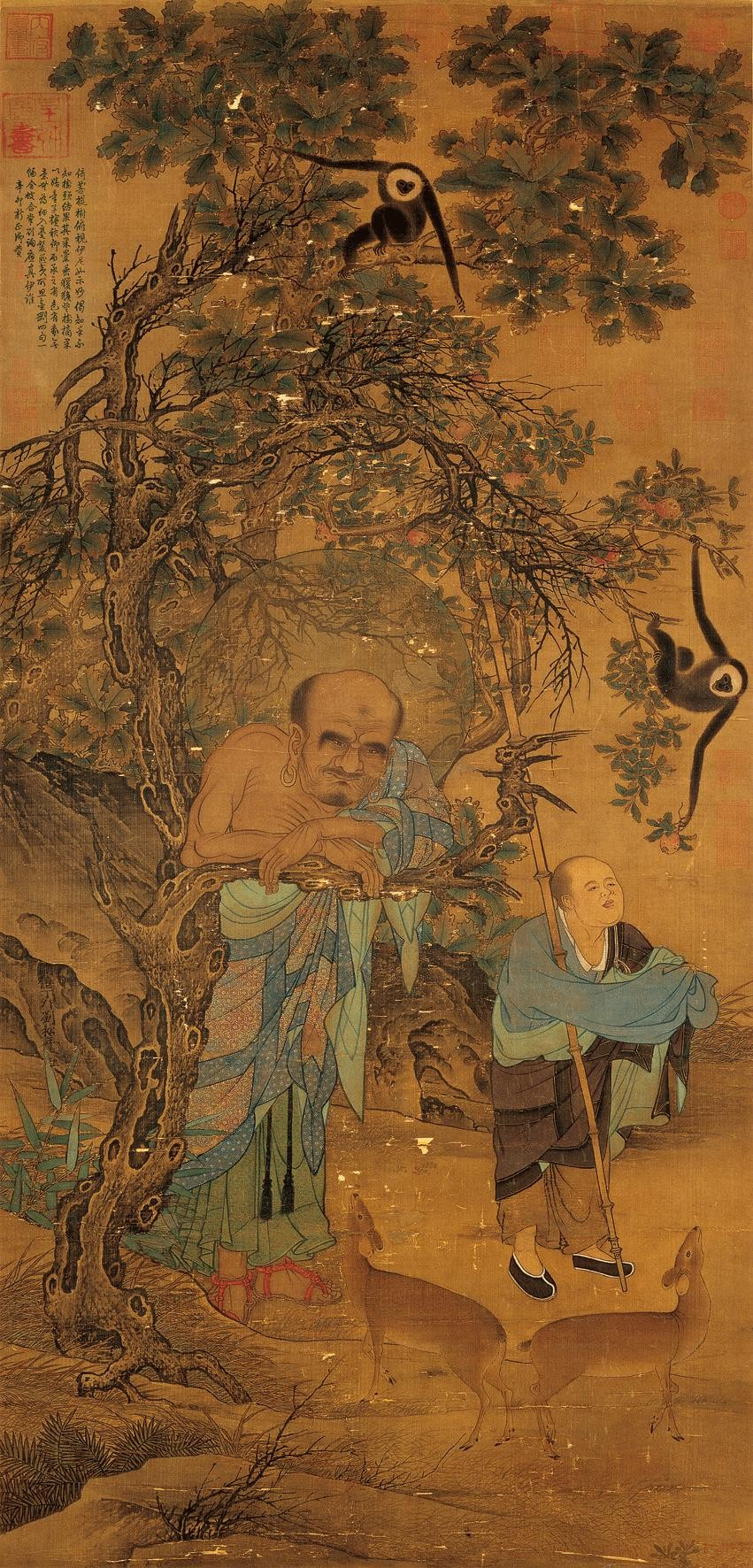
Luohan with gibbon, Liu Songnian, 1207

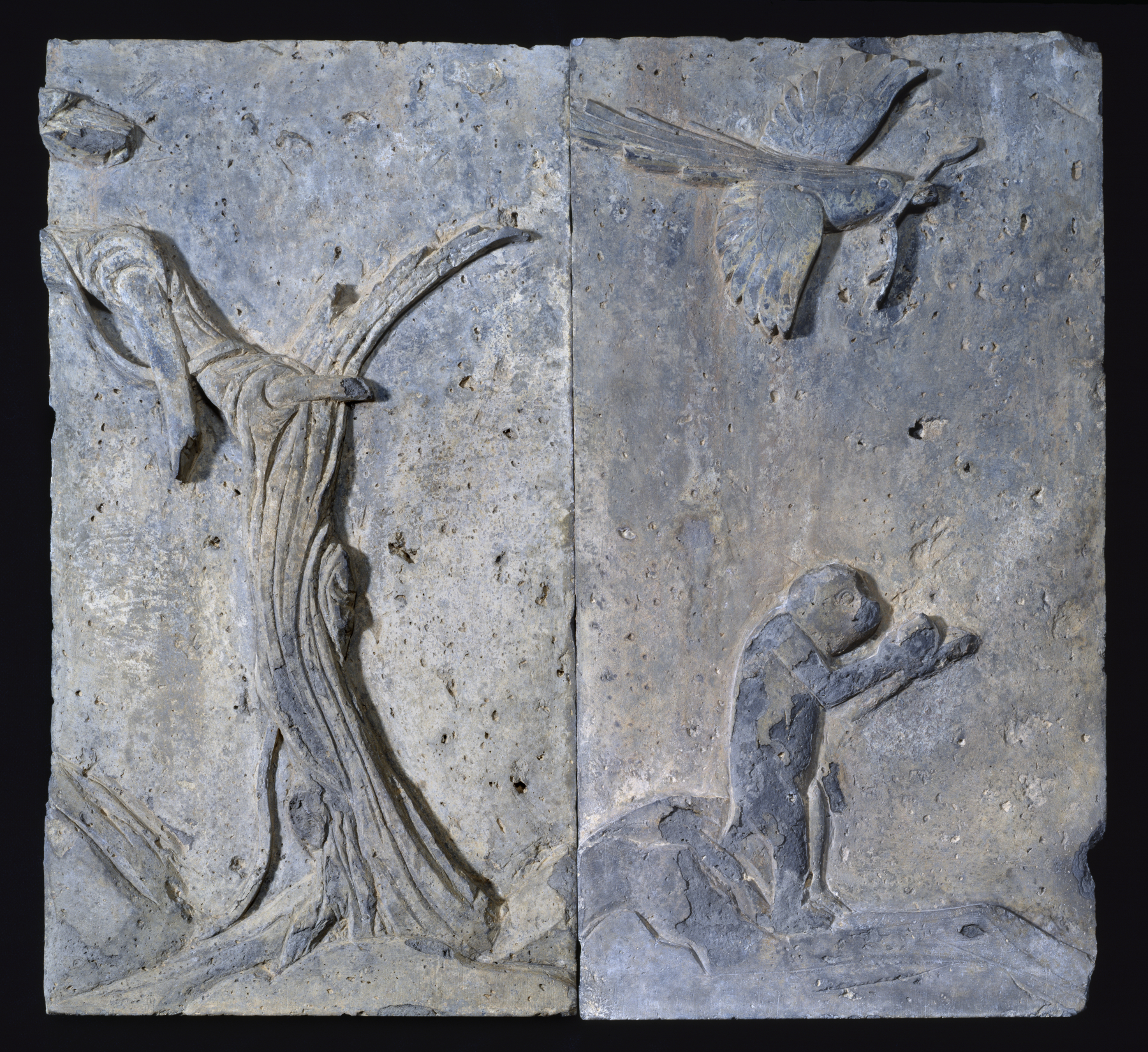
Buddhist legend about Pratyekabuddha and monkey, terracotta panel, 11th century

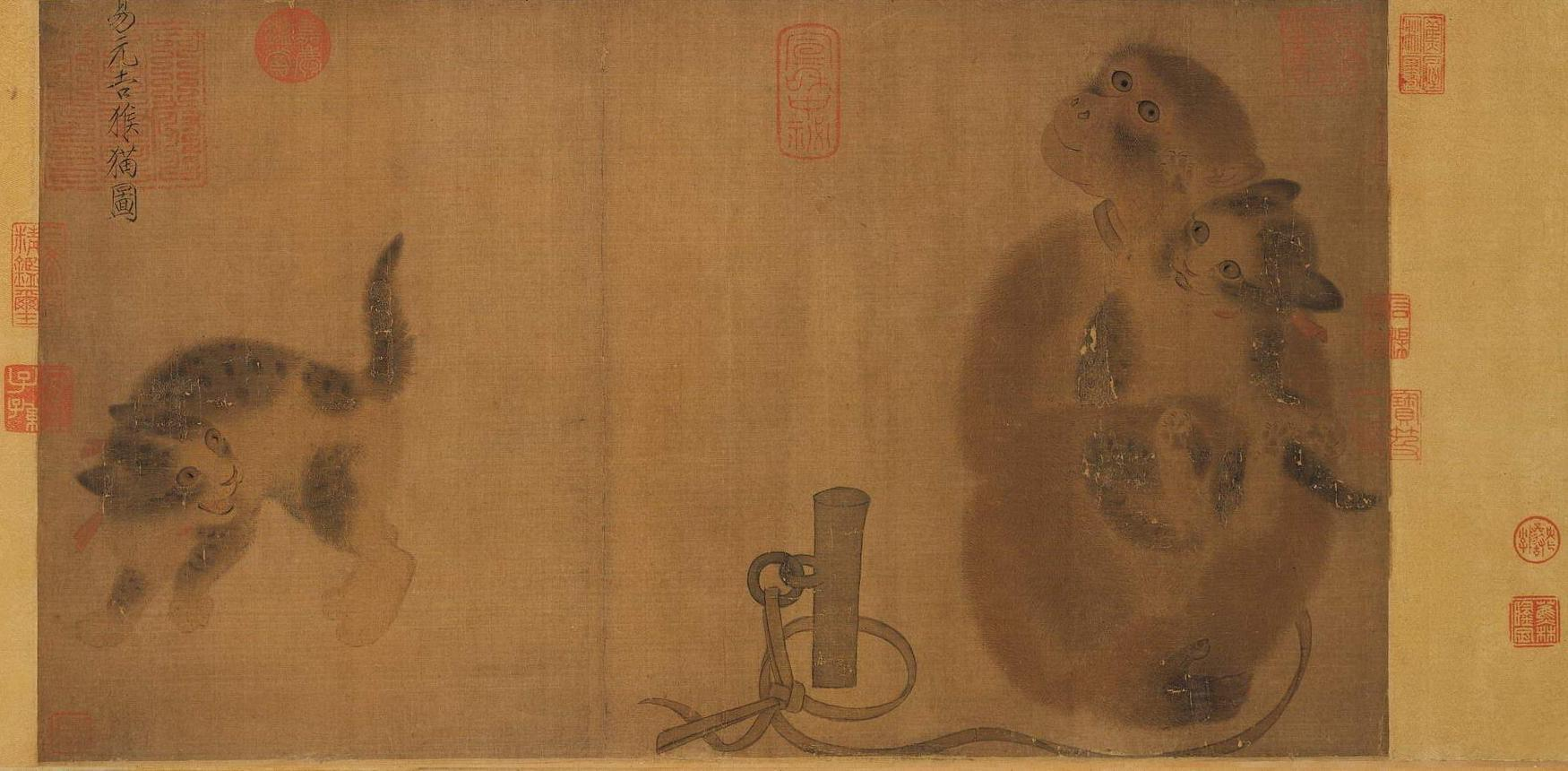
Monkey and Cats, Yi Yuanji, 11th-century

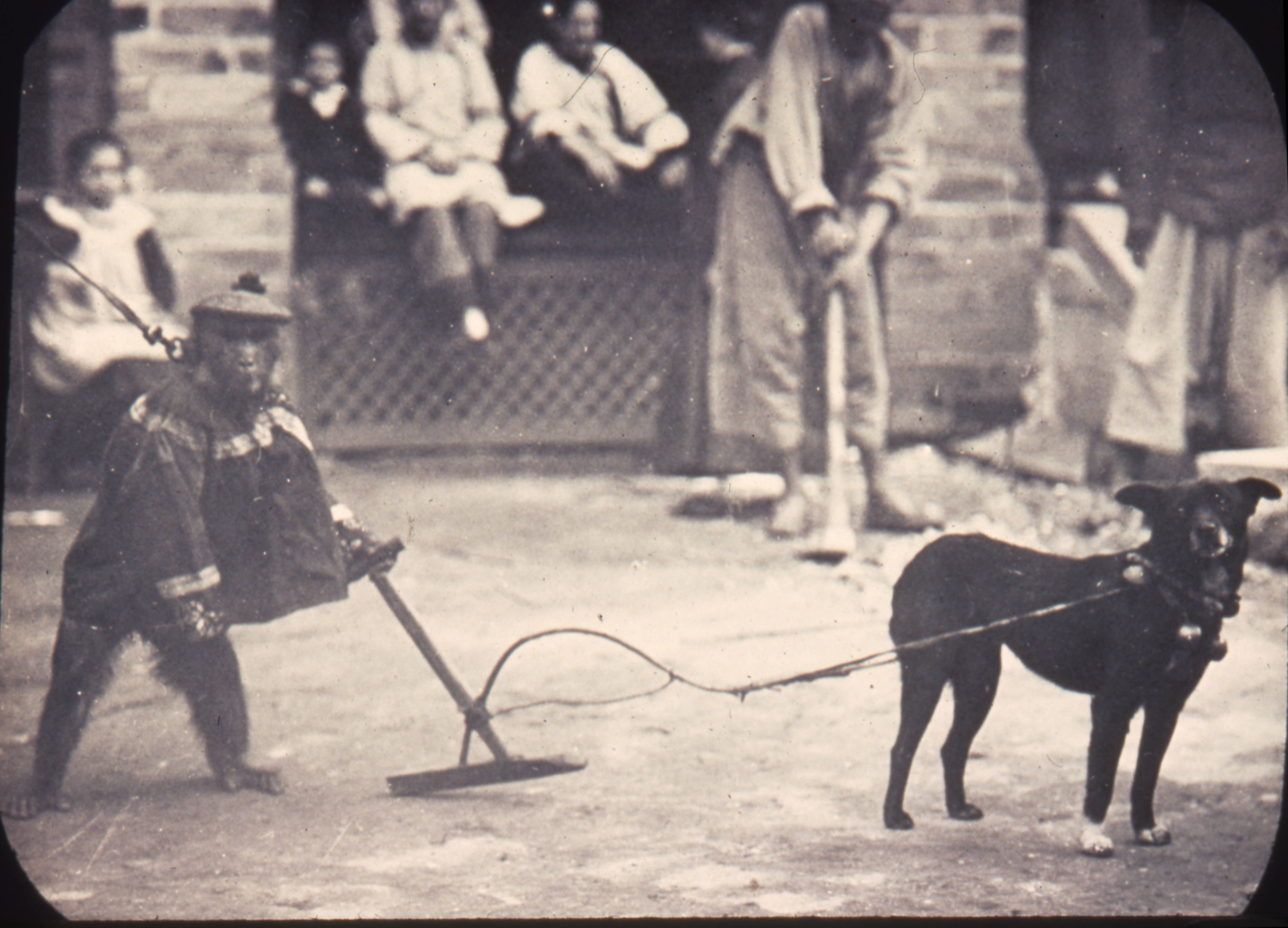
Monkey show, Hunan, c. 1900-1919
