= Feng (mythology) =

Creature in Chinese mythology and folklore

Chinese name
- Chinese: 封
- Literal meaning: raise a mound
Transcriptions
Standard Mandarin
- Hanyu Pinyin: fēng
- Wade–Giles: feng
Middle Chinese
- Middle Chinese: pjowng
Old Chinese
- Baxter–Sagart (2014): p(r)oŋ

Korean name
- Hangul: 봉
Transcriptions
- Revised Romanization: bong
- McCune–Reischauer: pong

Japanese name
- Kanji: 封
- Hiragana: ふう, ほう
Transcriptions
- Revised Hepburn: fū, hō

In Chinese mythology and folklore, Feng (Chinese: 封; pinyin: Fēng; lit. 'mound', 'hump') is an edible monster that resembles a two-eyed lump of meat and magically grows back as fast as it is eaten. Early Chinese texts also referred to this legendary food with the names Shìròu (視肉; 'look like meat'), Ròuzhī (肉芝; 'meat excrescence'), and Tàisuì (太歲; "great year; Jupiter"). Ròulíngzhī (肉靈芝; "meaty Lingzhi mushroom") is a modern name popularized by Chinese news media reporting on purported discoveries of Feng throughout China.

== Names ==
In Old Chinese, Feng meant "mound, tumulus, raise a mound; altar; earth up (a plant); wall, bank of field; boundary embankment, fief". In Modern Standard Chinese, it means "to seal; bank (a fire); confer (title/territory/etc.) upon, feudal; envelope". Feng occurs in other Chinese mythological names. Fengzhu (封豬 with "pig; swine") or Bifeng (伯封, with "elder brother; uncle"), the son of Kui and Xuanqi (玄妻, "Dark Consort"), was named owing to his "swinish" wickedness. Wolfram Eberhard says, Fengzhu translates "pig with a hump" because feng means "hump", although commentaries often interpret the word as "big".

Shìròu (視肉; "looks like meat") compounds shi (視; 'regard', 'look at/upon', 'inspect', 'watch', 'sight', 'vision') with rou (肉; 'meat', 'flesh', 'pulp', ''flesh' of melons/etc.'). The Kangxi Dictionary entry for shi (視) quotes Guo Pu's Shanhaijing commentary to use the otherwise unattested variant jùròu (聚肉, with 聚; 'gather', 'assemble', 'get together').

Tǔròu (土肉; 'soil flesh') compounds tu (土; 'soil', 'earth', 'clay', 'land', 'crude') with rou. Compare turougui (土肉桂, with 桂; 'cinnamon', 'cassia-bark tree'), which is the Chinese name for "Cinnamomum osmophloeum".

Ròuzhī (肉芝; 'meat excrescence') uses rou with the complex word zhi (芝; 'supernatural mushrooms', 'excrescences'). Fabrizio Pregadio explains, The term zhi, "which has no equivalent in Western languages, refers to a variety of supermundane substances often described as plants, fungi, or 'excrescences'." Língzhī (靈芝; 'spiritual excrescence') – known in English as the Lingzhi mushroom and identified with Ganoderma genus – is seen in the modern Feng name Ròulíngzhī (肉靈芝; 'meat Lingzhi mushroom').

Tàisuì (太歲; 'great year', 'Jupiter'), combining tai (太; 'great', 'very', 'too') and sui (歲; 'year (of age)') in reference to Jupiter's orbit of 11.86 years (12 years in Chinese tradition), is an old name for the planet Jupiter. Jupiter is the God of the Year in the Chinese zodiac and Fengshui, and worshiped in religious Daoism. Feng is considered to be the earthly manifestation of Jupiter's shen (神; 'spirit', 'god', 'deity') and sometimes syncretized with the deity Taisui Xingjun (who in the novel 三教源流搜神大全 is born from a lump of flesh)

== Classical usages ==
Beginning in the Han dynasty (206 BCE-220 CE), the Chinese classics have recorded Feng and its synonyms.

The Classic of Mountains and Seas has 14 usages of Shìròu (視肉; 'look like meat/flesh'), in locations north, south, east, and west of "The Classic of Regions Beyond the Seas" and "The Classic of the Great Wilderness". Scholars generally date these textual sections from around the 1st century BCE to 1st century CE, making shirou the earliest recorded name for feng. For instance,

Mount Menial [狄山]- the great god Lofty lies buried on its south face; the great god Tellswift lies buried on its north face. Here there are black bears and brown bears, striped tigers, long-tailed apes, leopards, and also the leave-scarlet bird, the look-flesh creature, and the sob-sigh creature.

"Lofty" and "Tellswift" translate Emperor Yao and Emperor Ku. Birrell notes that the shirou is:

A fabled creature, the recurring animalian motif of numerous utopian passages in the text, usually associated with the burial place of deities. Kuo notes that the look-flesh creature "is a mass of flesh which looks like the liver of an ox; it has two eyes. Even though you eat it, it is never really consumed, because it grows again, and is born again in the same form as it was before." This myth may constitute a utopian idea of a never-ending supply of meat, from the perspective of the inhabitants of poor rural areas.

The Shanhaijing commentary of Guo Pu (276-324) provides invaluable information about the shirou and turou 土肉.

It is a lump of meat in the shape of an ox liver. There are two eyes in it. It can be eaten as food. More of them can be found. Such things are called Feng and are edible. People do not know this. There is also another thing in the sea called Turou that is pure black and five cun in width. It is as big as an arm of an infant. There is an abdomen but no mouth and eyes. It has 30 legs. It can be stir-fried and taken as food. This is something like a cross between a worm and a fish, and is similar to Feng.

Feng also appears in the Shanhaijing mythic name fengshi (封石; 'fief stone'), for example, "[On Mount Accord], the yufu jade is abundant on its summit, as well as copious amounts of bloodstone and fief-stone." The Shanhaijing commentary of Hao Yixing (郝懿行, 1757–1825) quotes the (c. 533-544 CE) Qimin Yaoshu, "The stone is medicinal. It tastes sweet and is not poisonous."

Zhang Hua's (c. 290 CE) Bowuzhi "Record of the Investigation of Things" says, "In the land of Yuexi/Yuesui there is a cow that does not die if you cut a piece of meat off it. After some days the flesh has grown back again as before." Yuexi/Yuesui commandery was around present-day Xichang, Sichuan.

The (c. 320 CE) Baopuzi, written by the Jin Dynasty Daoist scholar Ge Hong, mentions ròuzhī (肉芝; 'meat excrescence') in two contexts. Ge Hong's "A Taoist Library" lists the illustrated text Ruozhitu (肉芝圖), which is no longer extant. "The Genie's Pharmacopia" (仙藥) categorizes zhi (芝 "a legendary numinous mushroom; Ganoderma; excrescence"), "There are five types of excrescences: rock [石芝], wood [木芝], herb [草芝], flesh [肉芝], and the tiny [菌芝, jun 菌 means "mushroom; fungus; bacterium; germ"]", and each of them has 120 species. The text lists six kinds of rouzhi "flesh excrescences" that will give one the invulnerability and longevity associated with Daoist xian. Here are two examples.

The ten-thousand-year-old hoptoad is said to have horns on its head, while under its chin there is a double-tiered figure 8 written in red. It must be captured at noon on the fifth day of the fifth moon and dried in the shade for a hundred days. A line drawn on the ground with its left root will become a running stream. When its left foreleg is carried on the person, it will ward off all types of weapons. If an enemy shoots at you, the bow and arrow will both turn against the archer. The thousand-year-old bat is as white as snow. When perching, it hangs head down because its brain is heavy. If both of these creatures are obtained, dried in the shade, powdered, and taken, a body can live for forty thousand years. If in the mountains you should come across a little man seven or eight inches tall riding in a palanquin or on a horse, it will be a flesh excrescence. By seizing and taking it you will immediately become a genie.

The Zazhi 雜志 "Miscellaneous Notes" by the Song dynasty official Jiang Linji 江鄰幾 (1005-1060) records that the Neo-Confucian teacher Xu Ji 徐積 (1028-1103) found a Feng in Luzhou (modern Anhui).

Mr. Xu Ji [徐積] once picked up a small baby at the riverside in Lu Zhou. There were no fingers on its hands and there was no blood in its body. He was afraid of it and buried it in the ground. This was actually Feng as recorded in the book Baize Tu. Eating such a thing will increase one's physical strength.

The (c. 3rd century) Baize tu (白澤圖; "Diagrams of the Baize 'White Marsh' Spirit") is no longer fully extant, but is identified with a Dunhuang manuscript (P2682).

The (1547) Xihu Zhi (西湖志 "West Lake Record") by Ming dynasty scholar Tian Rucheng (田汝成, 1503-1557) uses the name Taisui. "When Dung Biaoyi [董表儀] dismantled a house and dug up the earth, something like a lump of meat was found. A Taoist master said this was Taisui. It was harmless. So it was abandoned."

Li Shizhen's (1578) Bencao Gangmu classic Chinese materia medica includes the Feng under Chapter 51, which describes medicines derived from yu (禺; "monkeys") and kuai (怪; "supernatural creatures") such as the wangliang (魍魎; "a demon that eats the organs of corpses") and penghou (彭侯; "a tree spirit that resembles a black tailless dog"). The Feng entry quotes the Shanhaijing with Guo's commentary, the Zazhi, and Xihu Zhi. Bernard Read's translation glosses the Feng as "a naiad" and says, "This refers to a class of peculiar organisms such as the sea cucumber or anemones to which were accredited supernatural qualities, based upon the supposition that they were spiritual beings." The sea cucumber and sea anemone are both marine animals, as is the turou.

== Modern revival ==
For 2,000 years, the Feng creature (a.k.a. Taisui, Rouzhi, etc.) has been an obscure aspect of Chinese mythology, but in the late 20th century, Chinese media began reporting a series of fake Feng findings. In modern context, counterfeit and imitation goods made in China are so common that English borrowed the Chinese loanword shanzhai.

Most of the alleged Feng findings have been restricted to Chinese-language sources, often with extraordinary pictures. For instance, construction workers near Lüshunkou District of Dalian dug out a 7-to-8-kilogram lump of fatty meat, which they sold to a Mr. Sun (孙) for 20,000 yuan (about $3,200), who later began selling "Taisui" mineral water. The Xinhua reporter, who inspected Sun's "Taisui" kept in a water-filled tank, said it was about 40 cm wide, resembled white pig fat wrapped in a brown and yellow skin, and felt like sauced beef tendon.

One "Feng" story received international attention in June 2012. Xi'an Television reported that villagers digging a well had found a "Roulingzhi", which was being kept in a bucket of water. The reporter who handled the object described as a fleshy monster with a mouth and nose. However, after viewers identified it as a fleshlight sex toy with a vagina and anus, the story became an internet meme in China, and the station issued an apology.

== Comparative mythology ==
Legends about a "lump of flesh" are culturally widespread.

In Chinese mythology, the world-creator Hundun resembled a lump of flesh; the nine sons of the dragon were born as a limbless lump of flesh, split into nine parts and thrown them into the river, where they became dragon kings; the hero King Zhao of Zhou was born as a lump of flesh that had to be split; and the dead sometimes appear as a lump of flesh, like the Taisui. In a Chinese fairy tale, The Pretty Little Calf was born as the third wife's son, but the first and second wives claimed he was a lump of flesh, and tried to kill him by drowning and feeding to a water buffalo.

Examples can be found in many cultures. The Indian Mahabharata tells how Gandhari, the wife of Dhritarashtra, wished for 100 sons, and after two years of pregnancy gave birth to a lump of flesh, which were cut into 101 pieces and placed in jars, and developed into 100 sons and a daughter. The Tamil saint Thirumalisai Alvar was born as a limbless lump of flesh after twelve months in the womb, abandoned by his parents, and returned to life by Vishnu. The creation of man in the Qur'an (22:5) says, "We first created you from dust, then from a sperm drop, then from clotted blood, then a lump of flesh [mudghah], both shaped and unshaped, so that We might manifest to you [Our power]". In Welsh mythology, Lleu Llaw Gyffes was born from a lump of flesh dropped by Gwydion, and concealed in a chest until he matured. In Manx folklore, if a Tarroo-ushtey water bull mates with a cow, it only calves a lump of flesh and skin without bones.
