= Satori (folklore) =

Mind-reading monkey-like yōkai

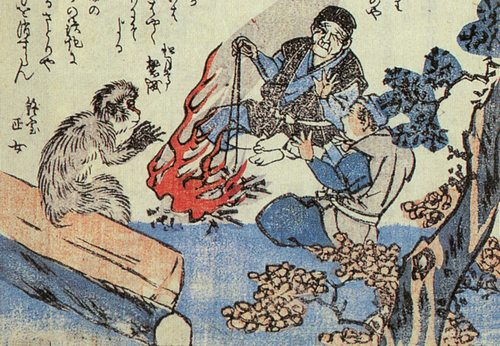
"Satori" is a "monkey" by Masasumi Ryūsaikanjin

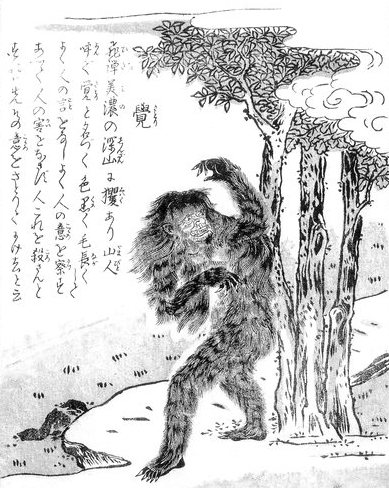
"Satori" from the Konjaku Gazu Zoku Hyakki by Sekien Toriyama

Satori (覚; "consciousness") in Japanese folklore are mind-reading monkey-like monsters ("yōkai") said to dwell within the mountains of Hida and Mino (presently Gifu Prefecture).

== Mythology ==
People are said to meet them while walking along mountain paths or resting in the mountains. Upon reading a person's mind, the satori would say the person's thoughts aloud faster than a human could. There is also a theory that they are the child incarnations of mountain gods who have come to ruin and turned into a yōkai form.

They would appear before people at mountain huts, and are even said to try to eat and kill if they have a chance, but if something unexpectedly strikes the satori, they become stricken with fear and run away. There is also a theory that they do not present any danger to people and would not dare to harm those who work on the mountain, allowing people to coexist with satori.

A satori is depicted in Toriyama Sekien's Konjaku Gazu Zoku Hyakki, but since this was modeled after the yamako (玃) in the Wakan Sansai Zue and other works, and since it even said, "there are yamako (玃) deep in the mountains of Hida and Mino" in the text along with it, it is said that Toriyama Sekien gave it the name "satori" since they are able to read (satoru) people's minds. The yamako was an ape man from Chinese legends, but in the Wakan Sansai Zue, it was an animal that read people's minds in Hida and Mino, and since the character 玃 can also be pronounced "kaku", the character 覚 (also "kaku") was used as one that fit for a replacement, which was later misread as "satori", so there is the interpretation that this is what gave birth to the legend of "satori" as a different kind of yokai than the yamako. There is also the theory that satori are based on the yamabiko found in the Konjaku Gazu Zoku Hyakki and the Hyakkai Zukan and other collections, but according to the folklorist Kunio Yanagita, from his work "Yokai Dangi", the folklore that satori would read people's minds, and the legend that yamabiko would imitate people's voices have the same origin.

== Cultural impact ==
- The Touhou Project characters Satori Komeiji and her younger sister Koishi Komeiji are both based on the satori.
- In Kamen Rider Hibiki, a Makamou has the same name as this yōkai and is introduced as one of the final villains of the last episode of the TV series, albeit it does not feature a monkey.
- In The Reincarnation of the Strongest Exorcist in Another World one of the ayakashi that Seika Lamprogue summons to uncover information from a demon spy is a satori depicting it as a large ape like creature.
- In The Legend of Zelda: Breath of the Wild and its sequel, a creature called a satori is known as The Lord of the Mountain. It is depicted as a glowing horse with cloven hooves and two owl-like faces, and can be found on Satori Mountain.
- In Haikyuu!!, the character Satori Tendō is named after the satori because of his style of intuition-based blocking almost never failing, and being considered a "Guess Monster" by others.

== See also ==
- Bigfoot
- Hibagon
- Yozakura Quartet
