= Penghou =

Tree spirit from Chinese folklore

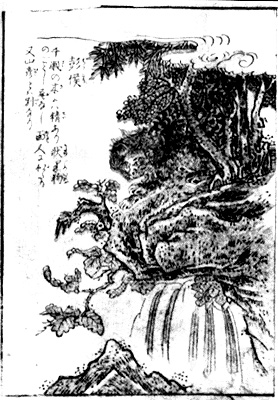
The hōkō illustration by Toriyama Sekien.

The Penghou (Chinese: 彭侯; pinyin: Pénghóu; Wade–Giles: P'eng-hou, pronounced [pʰə̌ŋ.xǒʊ]; literally: "drumbeat marquis") is a tree spirit from Chinese mythology and folklore. Two Chinese classics record similar versions of the Penghou myth.

The (c. 3rd century) Baize tu (白澤圖, "Diagrams of the White Marsh"), named after the Baize "White Marsh" spirit recorded in the Baopuzi, is no longer fully extant, but is identified with a Dunhuang manuscript (P2682). It describes the Penghou:

A creature that has evolved from the essence of wood is called Penghou. It looks like a black dog with no tail and its meat can be prepared as food. The essence of a 1,000-year-old tree may evolve into a spirit called Jiafei. It looks like a pig. Its meat tastes like dog meat. (tr. Luo 2003: 4132)

The (c. 4th century) Soushenji (搜神記, "In Search of the Supernatural") has a story about "The Penghou in the Camphor Tree":

During the Wu Kingdom (Three Kingdoms Period, 220–280) Jing Shu felled a big camphor tree. Then the wood bled and inside there was an animal that was similar to a dog but with a human face. Jing Shu said this was a Penghou. So he stewed the animal and ate it, which tasted like dog meat. (tr. Luo 2003: 4132, cf. DeWoskin and Crump 1996: 215–216)

Li Shizhen's (1578) Bencao Gangmu ("Compendium of Materia Medica") lists Penghou under Chapter 51, which primarily describes medicinal uses for monkeys. The entry quotes the Baize tu and Soushenji and describes Penghou meat as "sweet, sour, warm, and nontoxic" (tr. Luo 2003: 4132).

The Japanese pronunciation of Penghou is Hōkō (彭侯). This tree spirit is included in the Konjaku Hyakki Shūi, one of Toriyama Sekien's collections of monster illustrations. Sekien quoted the Soushenji and added the Baize tu 1,000-year-old tree description.
