= Jueyuan (mythology) =

Mythological monkey

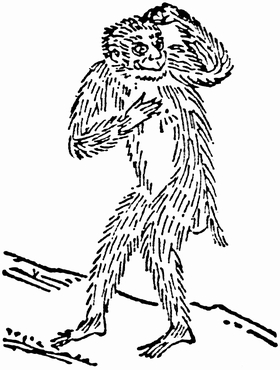
An example of a depiction from Japan. "Yamako" from the Wakan Sansai Zue.

Jué yuán (Chinese and Japanese: 玃猿; pinyin: Jué yuán; rōmaji: Kakuen) is a legendary animal in the legends of China. They are also called Jué (玃) (in Japanese kaku or ōzaru), Jué fù (玃父), Jiā (猳), Jiā guó (猳國) (in Japanese kakoku カ国), (Note: According to "Encyclopedia of Chinese Yōkai", the カ is actually 犭叚 as a single character.) and mǎ huà (馬化) (in Japanese baka). They are similar to monkeys, and thus possess a characteristic of carrying away human females and violating them.

== Summary ==
According to the medical herb book Bencao Gangmu (本草綱目), they are bigger than monkeys, and according to the Baopuzi (抱朴子), a míhóu (獼猴; "rhesus monkey")) that lives for 800 years becomes a yuán (猨; "ape"), and if they live for 500 more years, then they become a jué, which can live 1000 more years.

In the Bencao Gangmu, it is written as jué (玃) and jué fù (玃父). A "jué" is a monkey that has grown old, and has a dark blue color. It walks like a human, and they often kidnap humans or objects. There are only males and no females, and therefore they would abduct human females who then give birth to children.

According to In Search of the Supernatural (搜神記; Sou Shen Ji and a book titled Bo Wu Zhi (博物志), under the names Jué yuán (玃猿), Jiā guó (猳國), and mǎ huà (馬化), there is as follows. They live in the mountains in southwest Shu, and resemble monkeys, and with a height of about 7 shaku (about 1.6 meters), they walk like humans. They live in villages in the middle of mountains, and when humans pass by, they distinguish between males and females by their scent and abduct women, and as their own wives, make them bring birth to children. The women who are unable to bring birth to children are not allowed to go down from the mountain, and after 10 years, their appearance and mind becomes the same as those kakuen, and lose their will to return to the human village. The women who give birth to children are allowed to return to the human villages along with their children, but since those who don't raise their children all died after coming back down to the village, the women would be fearful of that and thus raise the child. Like this, the child that was born from a kakuen and a human woman would have an appearance similar to that of a human, and when raised, they are no different from an ordinary person at all. Originally, the child's family name should be from the father, but since the family name of the kakuen, who is the father, is unknown, they take on Yang (楊) as a provisional family name. In southwest Shu where there are many people with the family name Yang, it is said that they are all descendants of kakuen. It has been pointed out that kakuen like these with these characteristics match with the cryptid called yeren.

From the book Yijianzhi from the Southern Song era, there is as follows. On the bank of a certain of a mountain stream, when it became night a man appeared, and when people wanted to cross the river, he would carry them on his back and take them across. Even when the person asked him for the reason, he gave an admirable reply that it was for no reason except for his desire to help. The bold and brave man named Huang Dunli (黄敦立) thought him suspicious, three days after being ferried across the river the same way, said that he would ferry that man across the river as gratitude. The man, who refused, was thus forcibly taken by the arms and taken across the river and a large rock was thrown at him. The man who let out a cry was illuminated by a torchlight, and his appearance turned into that of a kakuen. When the kakuen was killed and burned, it is said that the bad smell reached several li away.

== Similar tales ==
According to the book Shenyijing (神異經), something in the west called a chóu (綢) (Note: According to the "Encyclopedia of Chinese Yōkai" (中国妖怪人物事典), it is actually "豸周" as a single character. This is adopting the 綢 which was used in the "Selection of Stories about Chinese Yōkai" (中国古典小説選).) was about as large as a donkey but resemble a monkey, but since they were all females and had no males, they would kidnap human males and engage in intercourse to get impregnated with a child (the same actions as a kakuen but with sexes reversed), and this is thought of similar to Jué yuán.

In Japan, during the Edo period, it was also believed that there were also kakuen in Japan, and in the encyclopedia Wakan Sansai Zue from the same period, it was explained under the name "yamako" (玃), and in this entry, bringing up the yōkai "kuronbō" (黒ん坊) (Note: In books by Shigeru Mizuki like the "Zusetsu Nippon Yōkai Daizen", it was written about under the name kokujinbō (黒人坊)) that lived deep in the mountains of Hida and Mino (now Gifu Prefecture), it stated "quite conceivably, this is probably a type of yamako." A kuronbō is a black large monkey-like creature with long hair and walks like a human. They are able to understand human language and able to read human's minds, so even if people attempt to kill a kuronbō, the kuronbō would quickly flee, so it is said that they are definitely unable to be captured.

Also, the word kuronbō also appears in the essay Kyōwa Zakki (享和雑記) from the late Edo period. According to that, in Neo, Mino Province (now Motosu, Gifu Prefecture), to a woman who lived at Senjo River, a suspicious phantom-like man would appear at night and visit, and attempted to have intercourse with her. The villages thus kept watch on that house in order to drive him away, but he did not appear at all on the night when they kept watch, and he appeared again when they stopped keeping watch. The woman thus kept a sickle that was hidden, and when that man appeared she cut with the sickle, and the man fled in a panic. When the villagers followed the trail of blood, it went through the house of a woodcutter named Zenbei, and continued to the mountains. A kuronbō previously had helped Zenbei with his work, and since the kuronbō didn't appear after that, it was said that the incident was the deed of a kuronbō.

The author of "Kyōwa Zakki" considered this to be similar to the kakuen from the Bencao Gangmu, and since its characteristics are pretty much the same as in the "Wakan Sansai Zue", it can be seen that "Kyōwa Zakki" could have been written while referring to the "Wakan Sansai Zue". However, as previously stated, since the "Wakan Sansai Zue" didn't write any more than "this is probably a type of yamako," it has also been pointed out that it cannot conclusively be stated that the kuronbō and the kakuen are the same.

In the Konjaku Gazu Zoku Hyakki by Sekien Toriyama from the Edo period, the appearance of a kakuen was drawn under the name "satori" (覚), and the writings, it stated that "deep in Hida and Mino, there are yamako (玃)."

== Notes ==
Remarks
