= Hyakkai Zukan =

Edo-period Japanese picture scroll

Hyakkai-Zukan (百怪図巻; "The Illustrated Volume of a Hundred Demons") is a picture scroll (emakimono) painted in Genbun 2 (1737) by the Edo period Japanese artist Sawaki Suushi (佐脇嵩之 (Sawaki Sūshi), 1707–1772), a student of Hanabusa Itchō. The scroll serves as a supernatural bestiary, a collection of ghosts, spirits and monsters (yōkai), which Suushi based on literature, folklore, and other artwork. These images had a profound influence on subsequent yōkai imagery in Japan for generations.

It was formerly a possession of the costume history researcher and Nihonga painter Yoshikawa Kanpō (1894–1979) and is currently held by the Fukuoka City Museum.

== Overview ==
According to the scroll's colophon (postscript), it was "Written by Ko Hōgen Motonobu, copied by Abe Suō-no-Kami Masanaga, and copied by Sawaki Suushi on a winter day in the second year of Genbun, Hinoto-Mi (1737)." As "Ko Hōgen Motonobu" refers to the late Muromachi period painter Kanō Motonobu, it is believed that this work was created by Suushi, who made a copy of a manuscript that had been handed down as a work painted by Motonobu.

This work contains a total of 30 yōkai paintings, and is considered a high-quality piece with careful brushwork. Because the production date is clearly known and other picture scrolls exist that contain the exact same number of yōkai with no differences, it is considered a standard work among "encyclopedia-style" yōkai picture scrolls. It is also evaluated as one of the essential works that can serve as a benchmark for modern research into picture scrolls depicting yōkai.

== Related works ==
Among works painted in the Edo period, there are picture scrolls that were painted with almost the same arrangement and composition as this work. However, many of them lack postscripts and their production years are unclear, so the chronological relationship between them is not defined.

Main examples with almost the same composition of yōkai (including examples with fewer entries):

- Bakemono Zukushi (Private collection) – The end of the scroll bears the signature "Authentic brush of Toba Sōjō".
- Bakemono Emaki (Kawasaki City Museum collection) – Contains fewer entries than Hyakkai-Zukan.

Main examples with an increased number of yōkai:

- Bakemono Zukushi Emaki (Private collection) 1802 – By the Kanō school painter Kanō Yoshinobu. It has slightly more entries than Hyakkai-Zukan, containing 35 types.
- Bakemono no e (Brigham Young University, Harold B. Lee Library collection, United States) – Contains more yōkai than Hyakkai-Zukan, depicting creatures such as the Umibōzu, Umi-otoko, and Nurikabe. It is part of the Harry F. Bruning Collection held by the L. Tom Perry Special Collections.

== Influence ==
=== Gazu Hyakki Yagyō ===
Gazu Hyakki Yagyō (1776) by the Ukiyo-e artist Toriyama Sekien, which is known as a work depicting yōkai of the Edo period, also records many of the yōkai found in this scroll. For this reason, it is believed that Sekien referenced picture scrolls of this same lineage when producing his book.

Several names are changed in Gazu Hyakki Yagyō: "Wauwau" becomes "Ouni"; "Mehitotsubō" becomes "Aobōzu"; "Akakuchi" becomes "Akashita"; and "Nukekubi" becomes "Hitoban". Additionally, the "Kamikiri" (Hair Cutter) is not drawn; instead, the "Amikiri" (Net Cutter), which similarly has claws shaped like scissors, is depicted.

Furthermore, "Yume no Seirei" (Dream Spirit) is the only one whose correspondence with Gazu Hyakki Yagyō is not clear. However, yōkai researcher Katsumi Tada observes that because the character for "dream" (夢) resembles the cursive script for "grass" (草)—and because there are documents that refer to it as the "Spirit of Grass"—it may correspond to the "Mokumi" (Tree Spirit). Alternatively, because it relates to the meaning of "dream," Tada suggests it may correspond to the "Makuragaeshi" (Pillow Shifter) in Gazu Hyakki Yagyō.

=== Hyakki Yagyō Emaki (Matsui Bunko) ===
The Hyakki Yagyō Emaki (1832) held by the Matsui Bunko, which was painted in the Edo period, also contains almost all of the yōkai seen in this scroll. However, some names have been changed, such as "Otoroshi" becoming "Ke-ippai" (Hairy), "Kamikiri" becoming "Tengu-hadaka-go" (Tengu Naked Child), and "Uwan" becoming "Gagoze". While it depicts a number of yōkai that greatly exceeds the 30 bodies in Hyakkai-Zukan, many aspects regarding how the additional yōkai were added remain unclear, as research into this area has not yet progressed.

== Scroll gallery ==
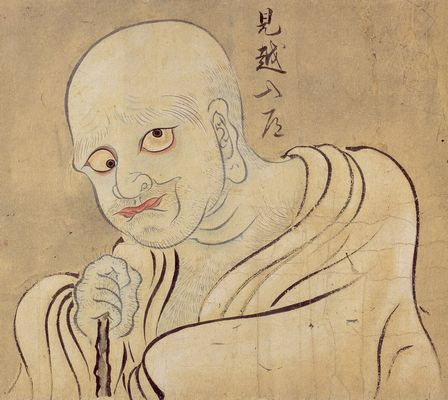
Mikoshi-nyūdō (見越入道)

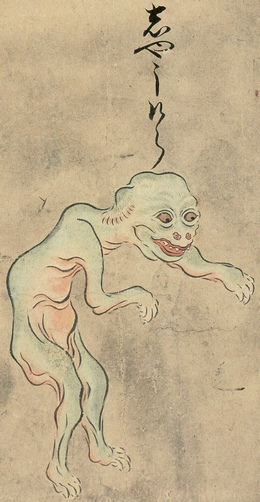
Shōkera (しやうけら)

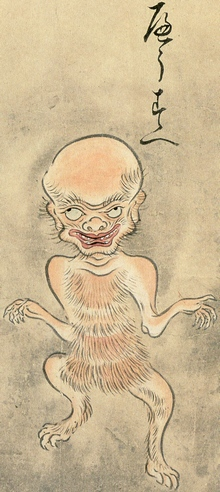
Hyōsube (へうすへ)

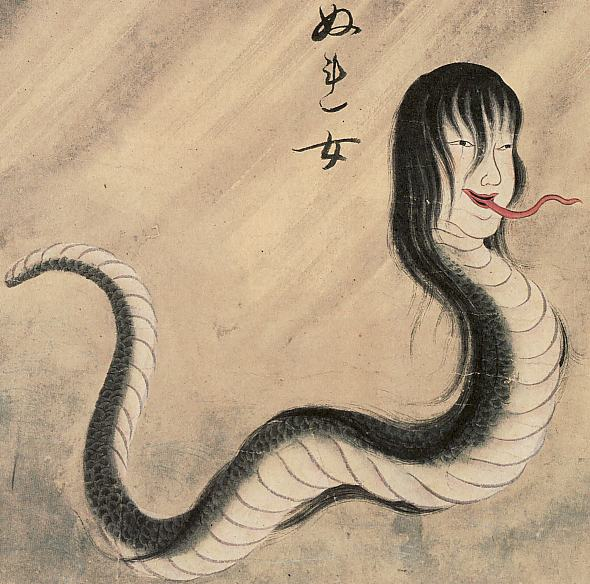
Nure-onna (ぬれ女)

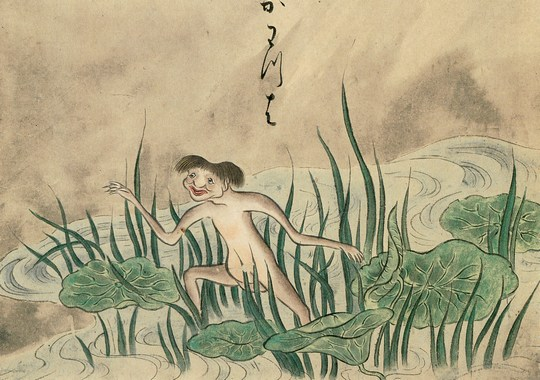
Kappa (かわつは)

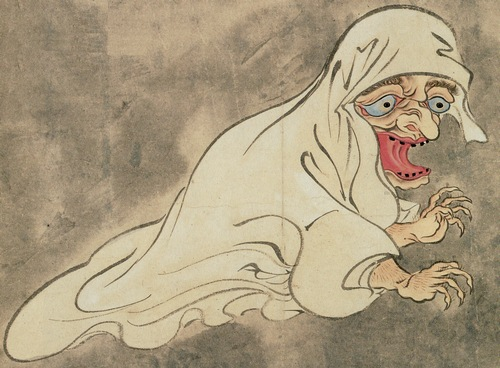
Gagoze (がごぜ)

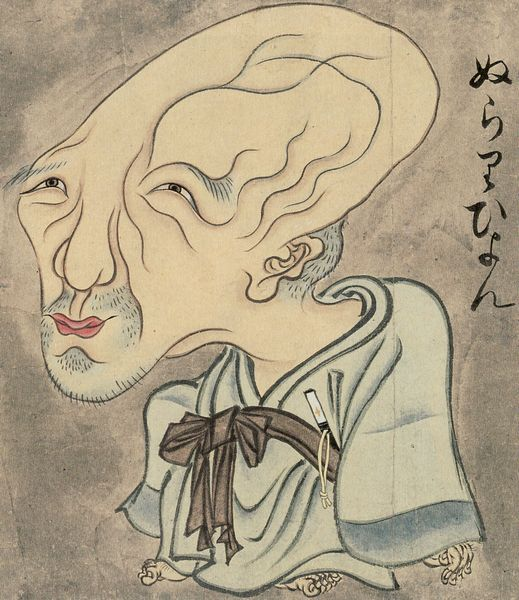
Nurarihyon (ぬらりひょん)

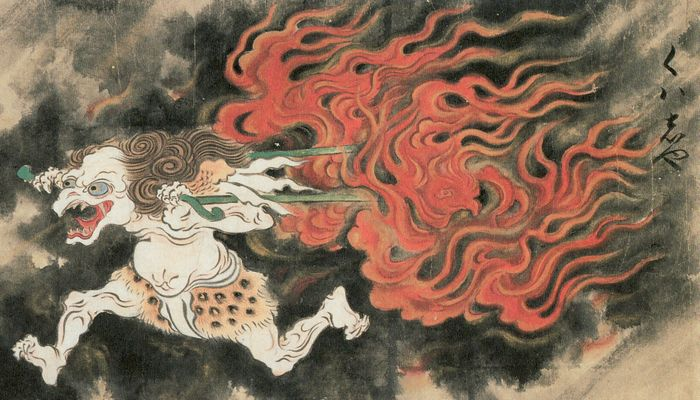
Kasha (火車)

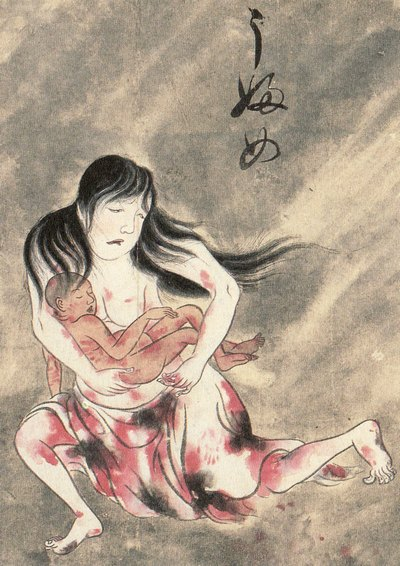
Ubume (うぶめ)

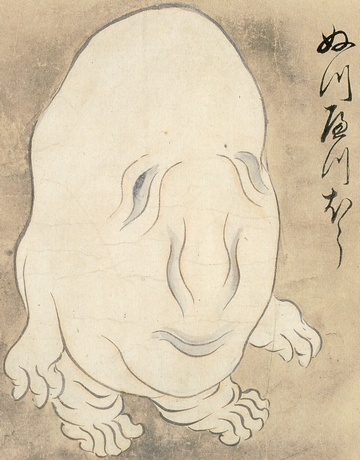
Nuppeppō (ぬつへつほう)

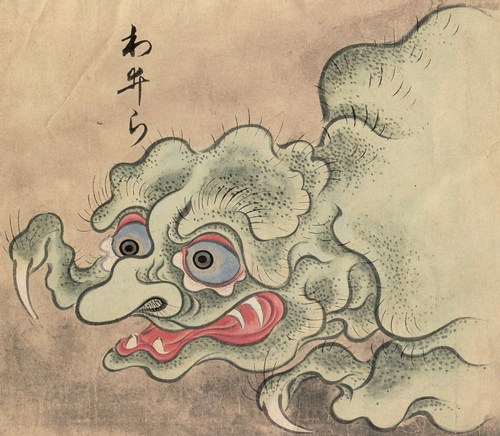
Waira (わいら)

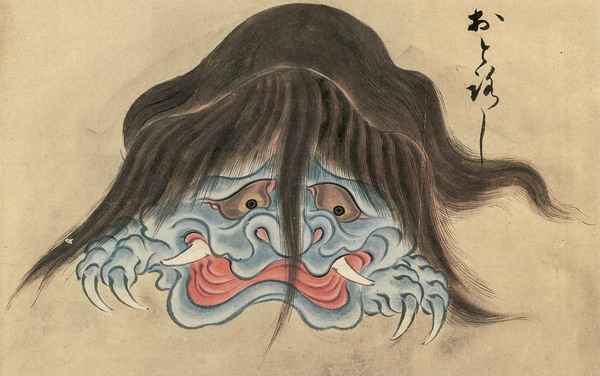
Otoroshi (おとろし)

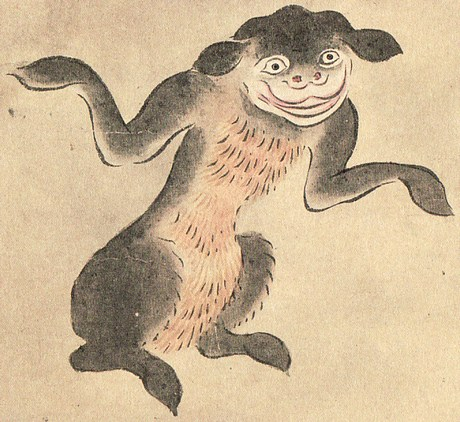
Yamabiko (山びこ)

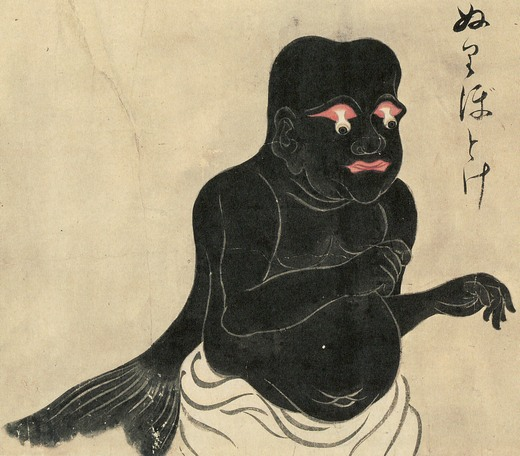
Nuribotoke (ぬりぼとけ)

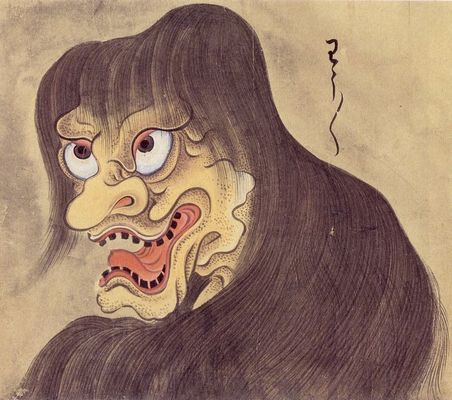
Wauwau (わうわう)

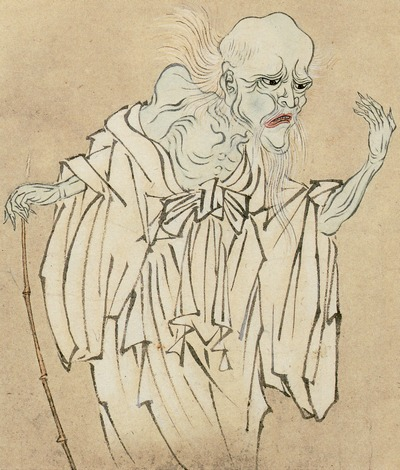
Yume no seirei (夢のせいれい)

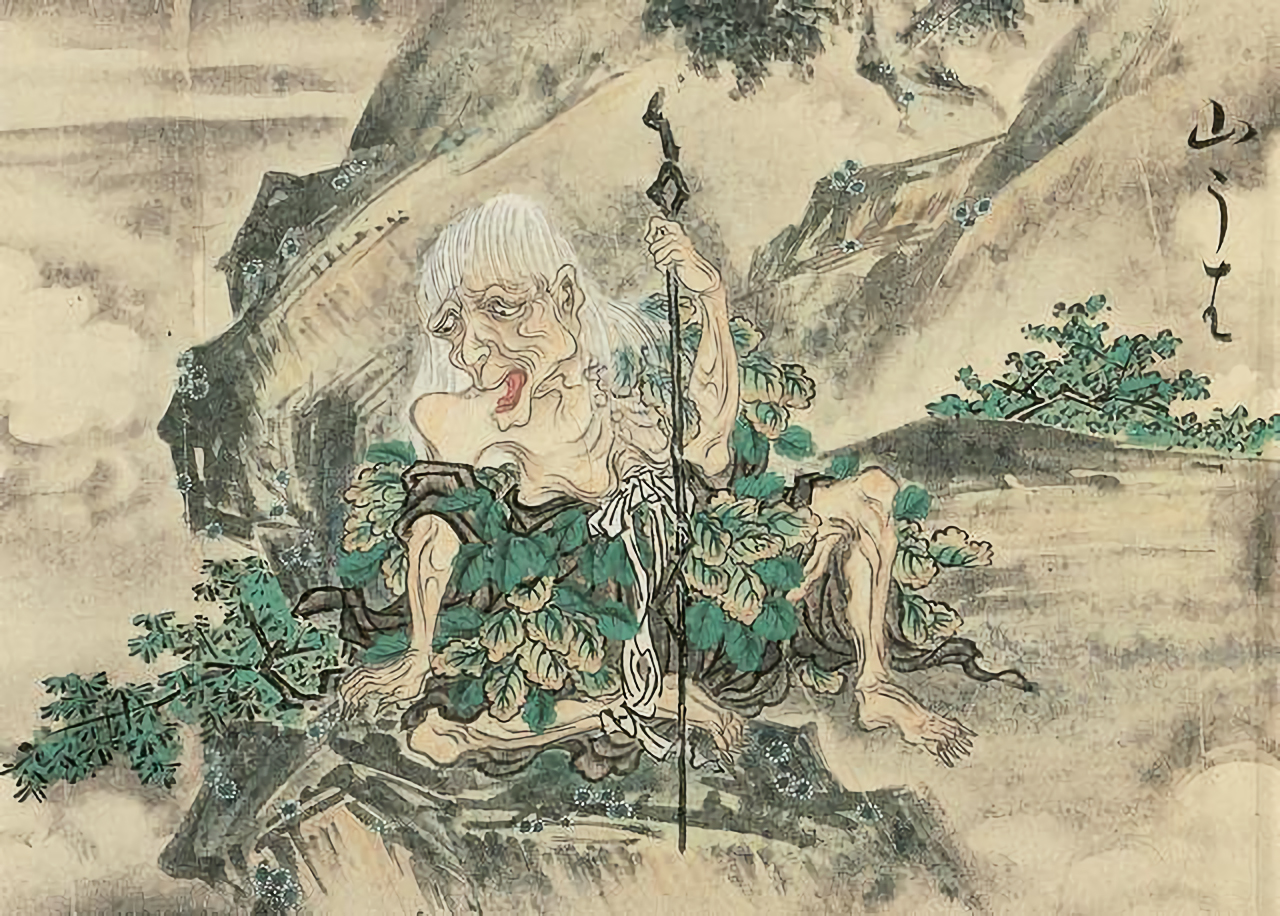
Yamauba (山うは)

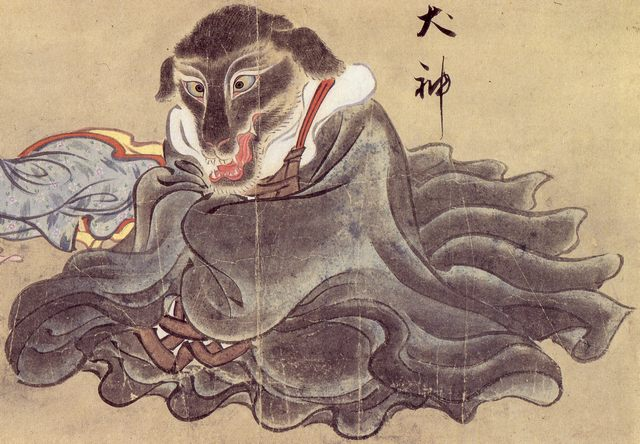
Inugami (犬神)

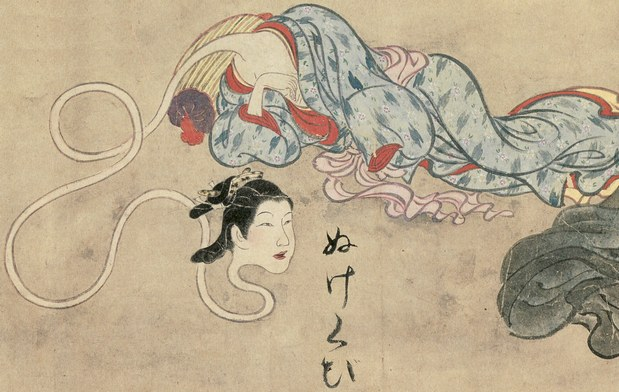
Nukekubi (ぬけくび)

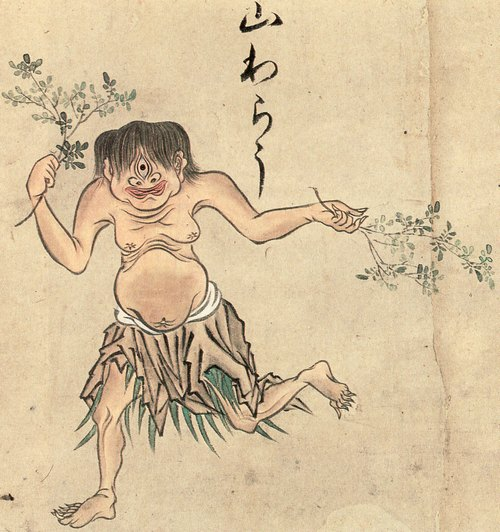
Yamawarau (山わらう)

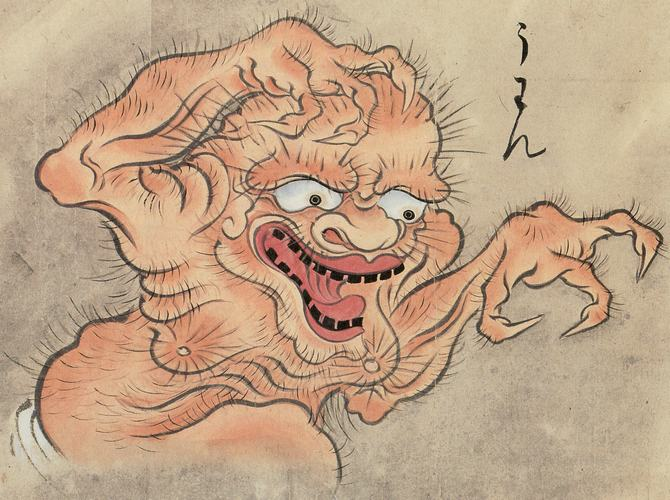
Uwan (うわん)

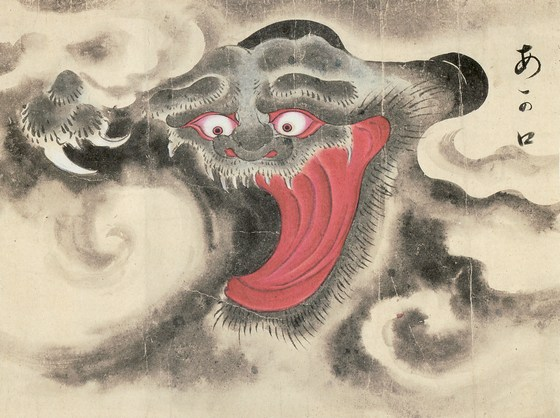
Akaguchi (あか口)

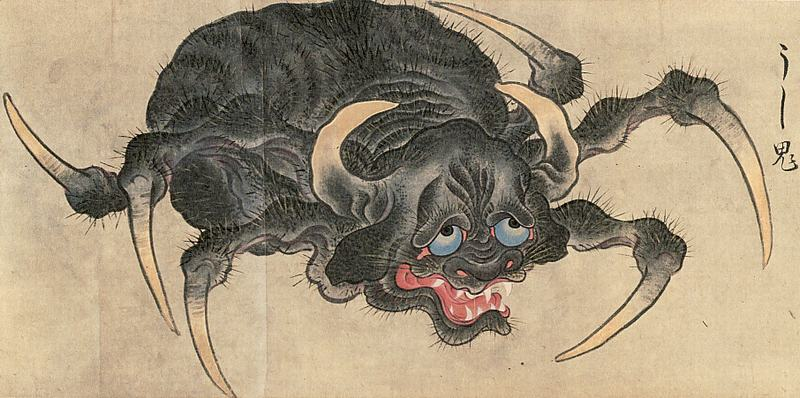
Ushi-oni (うし鬼)

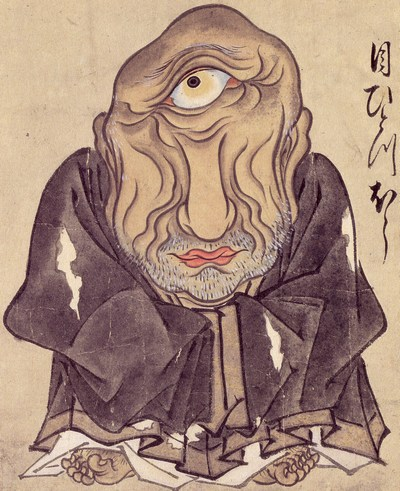
Mehitotsu-bō (目ひとつぼう)

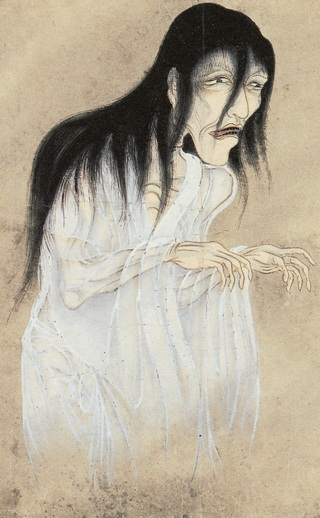
Yūrei (ゆふれゐ)

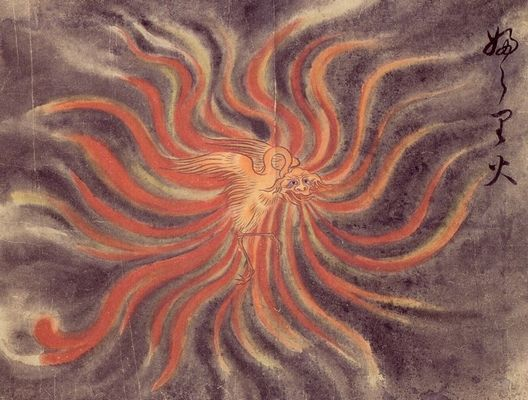
Furaribi (ふらり火)

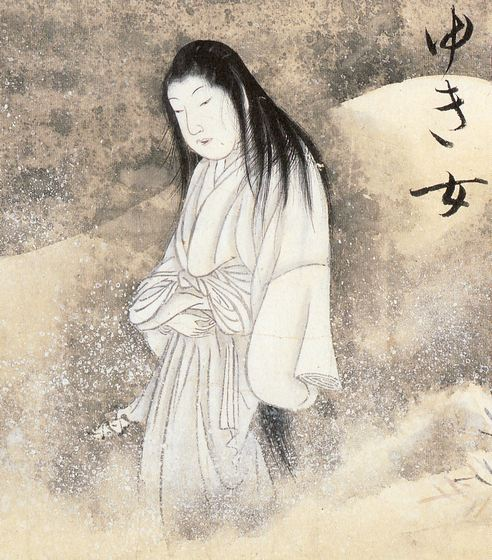
Yuki-onna (ゆき女)

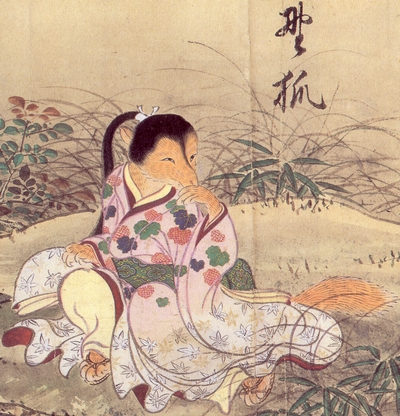
Yako (野狐)

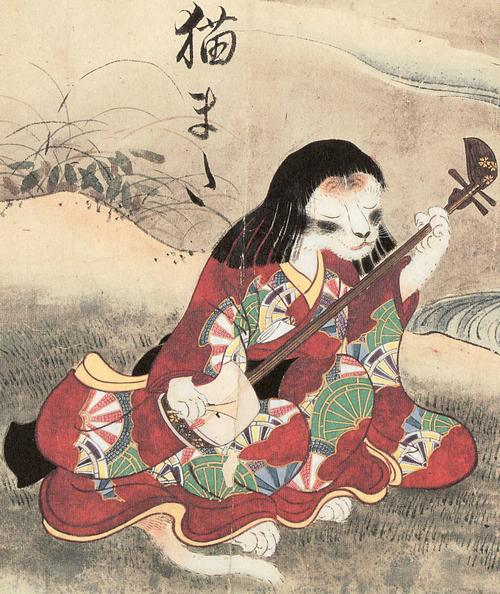
Nekomata (猫また)

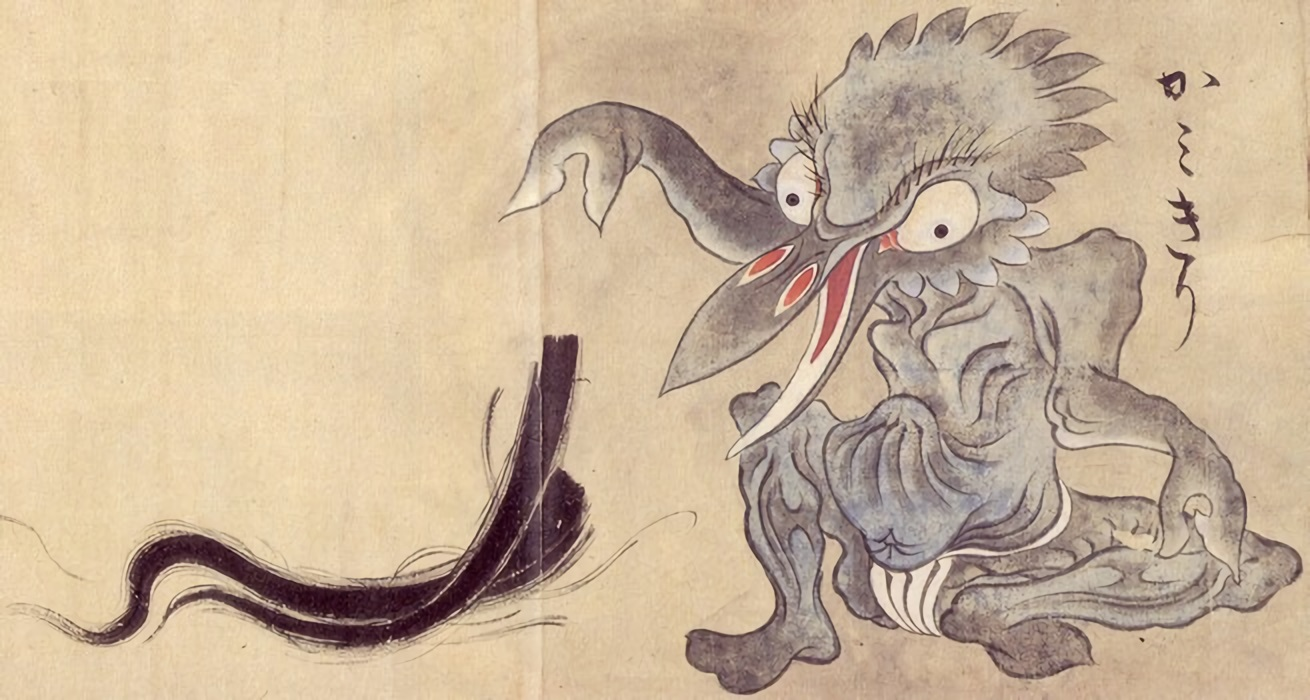
Kamikiri (かみきり)

== See also ==
- List of legendary creatures from Japan
- Tsukumogami
