= Ouni =

Monster in Japanese mythology

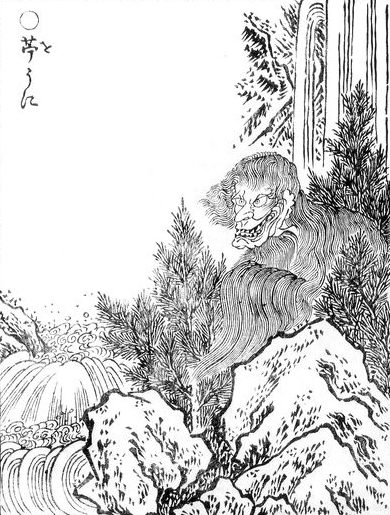
"Ouni" (苧うに) from the Gazu Hyakki Yagyō by Toriyama Sekien

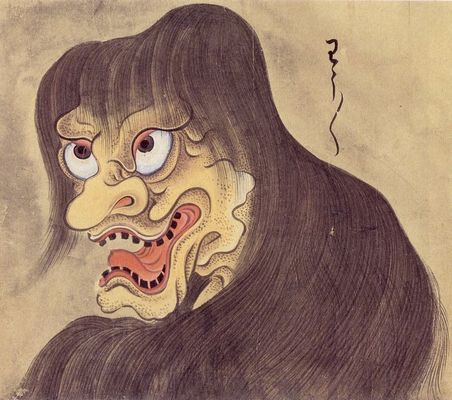
"Wauwau" (わうわう) from the Hyakkai Zukan by Sawaki Suushi

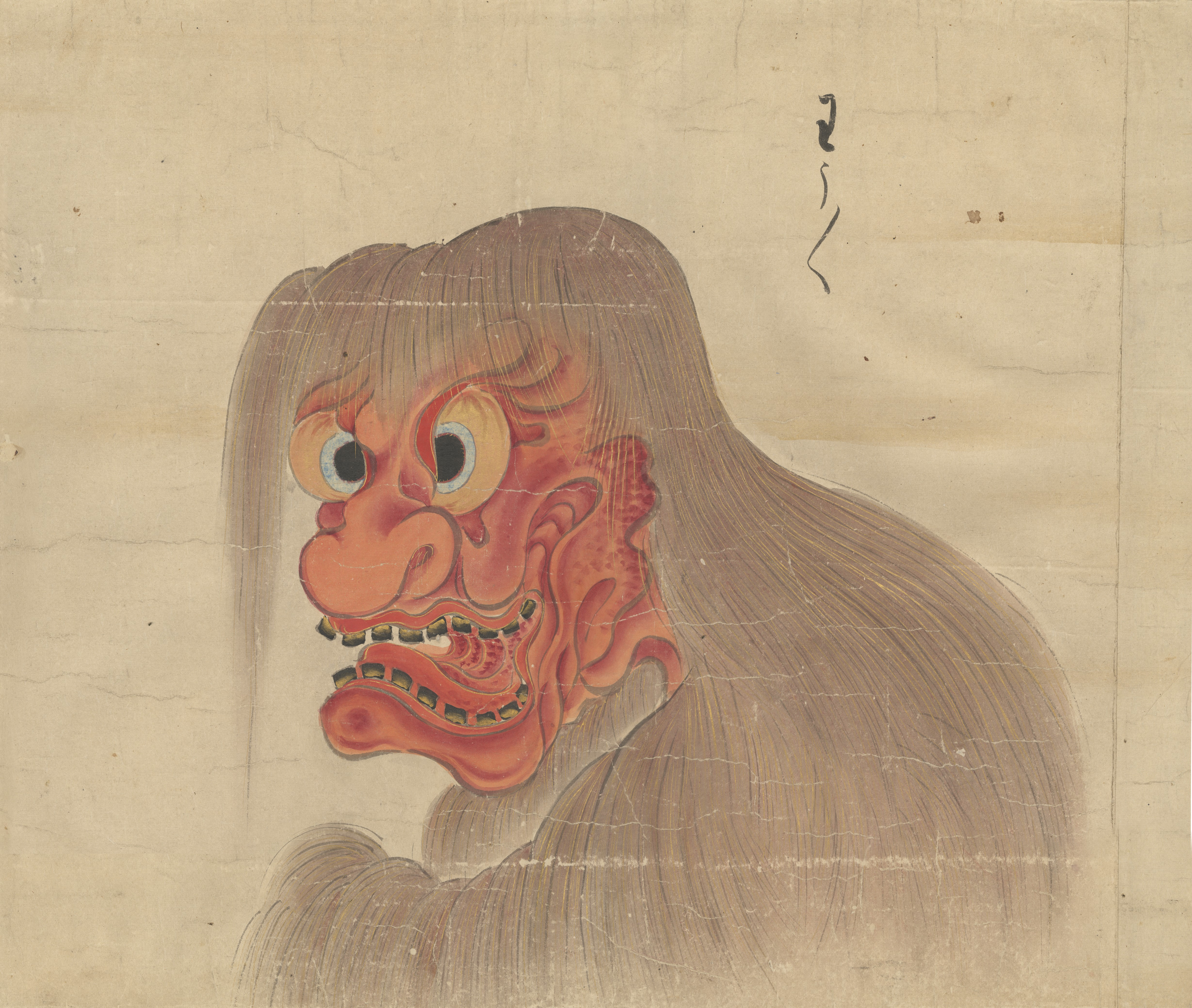
Wauwau (わうわう) from Bakemono no e (化物之繪, c. 1700), Harry F. Bruning Collection of Japanese Books and Manuscripts, L. Tom Perry Special Collections, Harold B. Lee Library, Brigham Young University.

The ouni (苧うに) is a yōkai depicted in the Gazu Hyakki Yagyō by Toriyama Sekien.

It is a yōkai with a face like that of a demon woman (kijo) torn from mouth to ear, and its entire body is covered in hair. There is no explanatory text from Sekien, so it is unclear what kind of yōkai this is. The "o" (苧) in "ouni" refers to the ramie plant or to bundles of string made from ramie, hemp, among others, so it is said that Sekien gave it the name "ouni" because it conjures up the image of a yōkai with head and body hair made of layers of this "o".

In the Hyakkai Zukan (1737, Sawaki Suushi), a yōkai emaki from the Edo period, it is given by the name "wauwau", and Edo period yōkai emaki would usually present it under that name. However, these presentations consisted of pictures, so it is not known what characteristics they had. In another instance, there is a drawing in the Hyakki Yagyō Emaki (Oda Gōchō, 1832) from after Sekien's era where it is depicted under the title of "uwan uwan", and it is thought that likewise the ouni is a yōkai that Sekien drew while referring to earlier emaki.

== Explanatory text starting in Heisei ==
There are no folk legends or records that are clearly about the ouni (or the "wauwau" based on Sekien's), so it is presently not clear what kind of yōkai they were intending to depict, but starting in the Heisei period, inferring from how there are many tales that seem highly related to the previous "o" and the yamauba, there have started to be many illustrated references, books, and other publications that suppose that these are yamauba who assisted in the making of threads and were taken in under the name "ouni", which would mean that the ouni is a type of yamauba. There are many areas with tales about yamauba who would make threads from o (苧), but the following example is from Kotaki, Nishikubiki, Echigo Province (now Itoigawa, Niigata Prefecture).

There was a gathering of women who were spinning some bundles of strings with hemp, when a yamauba appeared and said "I'll also spin some" and started to help along. The yamauba bit the hemp and drew out strings and then spun bundles of string at a speed unbelievable for humans. After finishing the assistance, the yamauba left the house. The women tried to follow, but the yamauba abruptly disappeared.

Before the proliferation of the idea that yamauba were related, they were often given the explanation that they would attack and eat people who come for a drink at a mountain stream. This can be said to be due to the picture drawn by Sekien.
