= Yume no seirei =

Yōkai in Japanese mythology

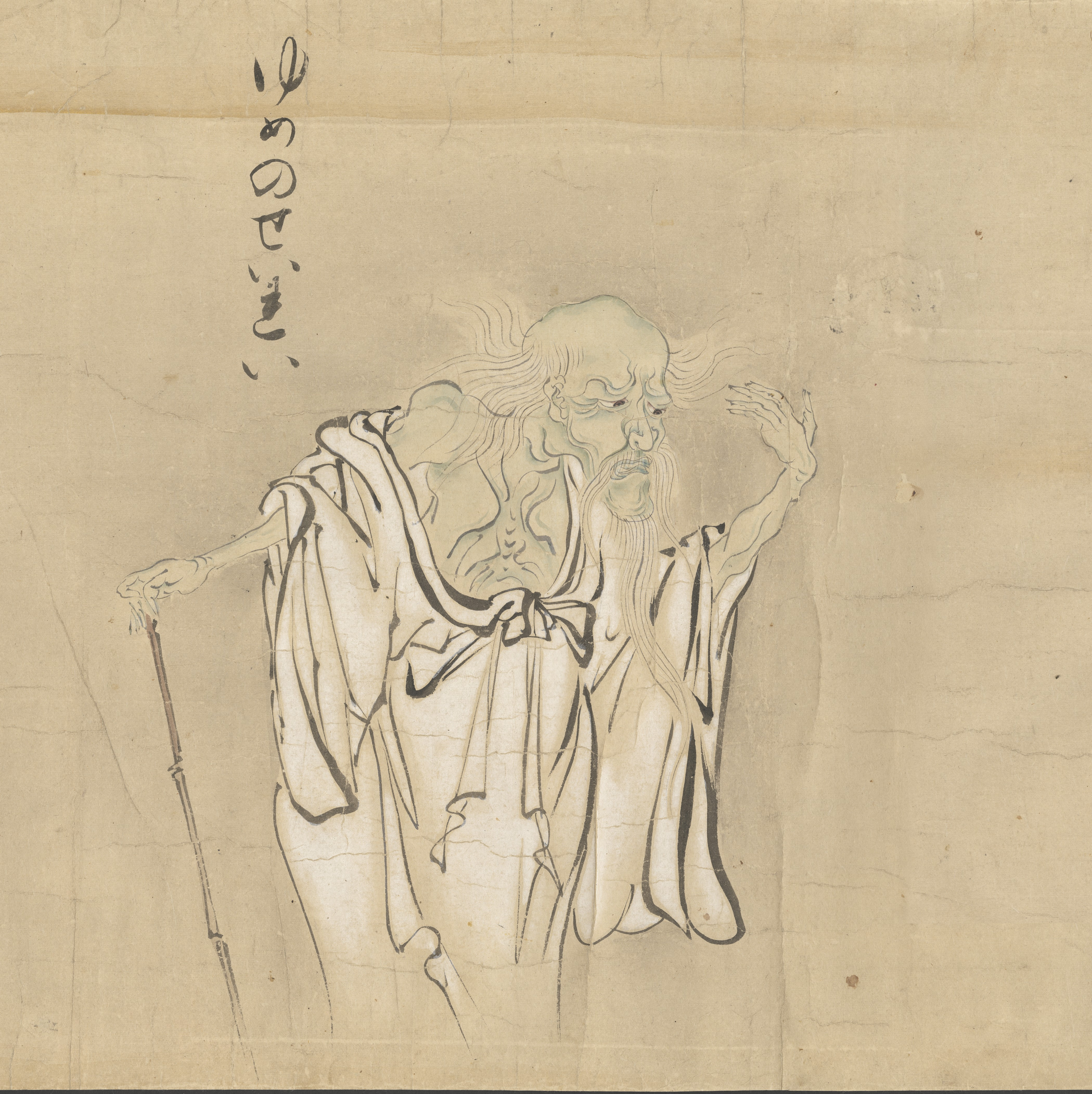
Yume no seirei ゆめのせいれい from Bakemono no e (化物之繪, c. 1700), Harry F. Bruning Collection of Japanese Books and Manuscripts, L. Tom Perry Special Collections, Harold B. Lee Library, Brigham Young University

Yume no seirei (夢の精霊, "dream spirit") is a mysterious yōkai in Japanese mythology, believed to cause nightmares.

== Origins ==
Belief in the supernatural was particularly strong during the Heian and Edo periods. During this time, many believed that the spirits of the dead caused a multitude of evils for the living. On certain nights, demons and ghosts would move in a haunting procession from dusk to dawn, known as the Hyakki yakō or night procession of one hundred demons.* Occasionally, yume no seirei appears in this procession. He appears in the Hyakkai Zukan, "The Illustrated Volume of a Hundred Demons," created by Sawaki Suushi in 1737. Yume no seirei is also part of the Bakemonozukushie (化物尽絵, "Illustrated Index of Supernatural Creatures"), housed in the Harry F. Bruning Collection of Japanese Books and Manuscripts of the L. Tom Perry Special Collections, Harold B. Lee Library at Brigham Young University.

== Physical appearance ==
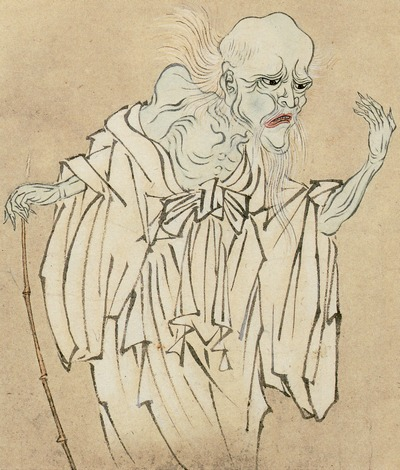
Sawaki Suushi, Yume-no-seirei from the Hyakkai-Zukan, circa 1737

Artists depict yume no seirei as an emaciated, elderly man. He wears a loose white robe, which reveals his frail body and exposed ribcage. His thin wispy hair flows behind him in a ghostly motion. In his right hand he holds a cane and with his left he reaches out, beckoning. The bottom half of his body eerily fades away as if he is disappearing. His appearance is similar to the description of the female ghosts Yūrei.

During the Edo Period (1600–1867) a female yūrei was conceived of in terms not unlike that of a Western ghost. Artists often depicted her with long straight hair and waving or beckoning hands. Pale clothing with long, flowing sleeves was draped loosely about the seemingly fragile figure, and the head and upper part of the body were strongly delineated. From the waist down, however, the form was misty and tapered into nothingness.

== Similar yōkai ==
=== Baku ===
Baku, or dream-eater, is a benevolent yōkai with the power to eat nightmares. As a remedy for nightmares, baku can be seen as the antithesis of yume no seirei.

=== Binbōgami ===
In some sources, this image of yume no seirei is used to illustrate the kami of poverty, binbōgami. Like yume no seirei, binbōgami is a skinny, dirty, old man. Perhaps their similar physical description explains why this image of an old emaciated figure has been used for both yōkai. However, unlike yume no seirei who brings nightmares, binbōgami brings poverty.

=== Makura-gaeshi ===
Makura-gaeshi, or pillow shifter, is another yōkai related to sleep. Sleep was a particularly vulnerable state of being because it was believed that the spirit and physical body seemed to separate while dreaming. The pillow was a threshold, a sort of magical device, that allowed one to travel to another world. Because of this, pillows were treated with respect. It would have been disturbing to wake up and discover that your pillow had been shifted. If the makura-gaeshi moved your pillow while you were asleep, it was possible that your spirit would not be able to return to the body. This threat turns a seemingly innocuous prank into a deadly one and is all the more frightening because of the vulnerable unconscious state of dreaming.
