= Uwan =

Disembodied voice from Japanese folklore

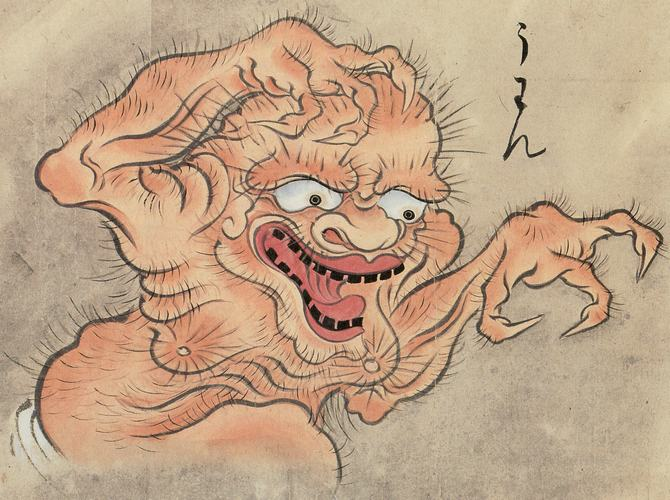
"Uwan" from the Hyakkai-Zukan by Sawaki Suushi

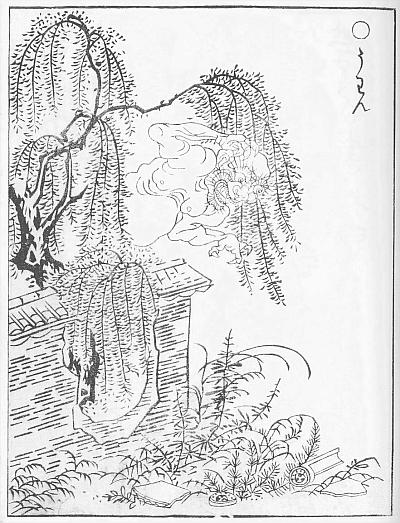
"Uwan" from the Gazu Hyakki Yagyō by Sekien Toriyama

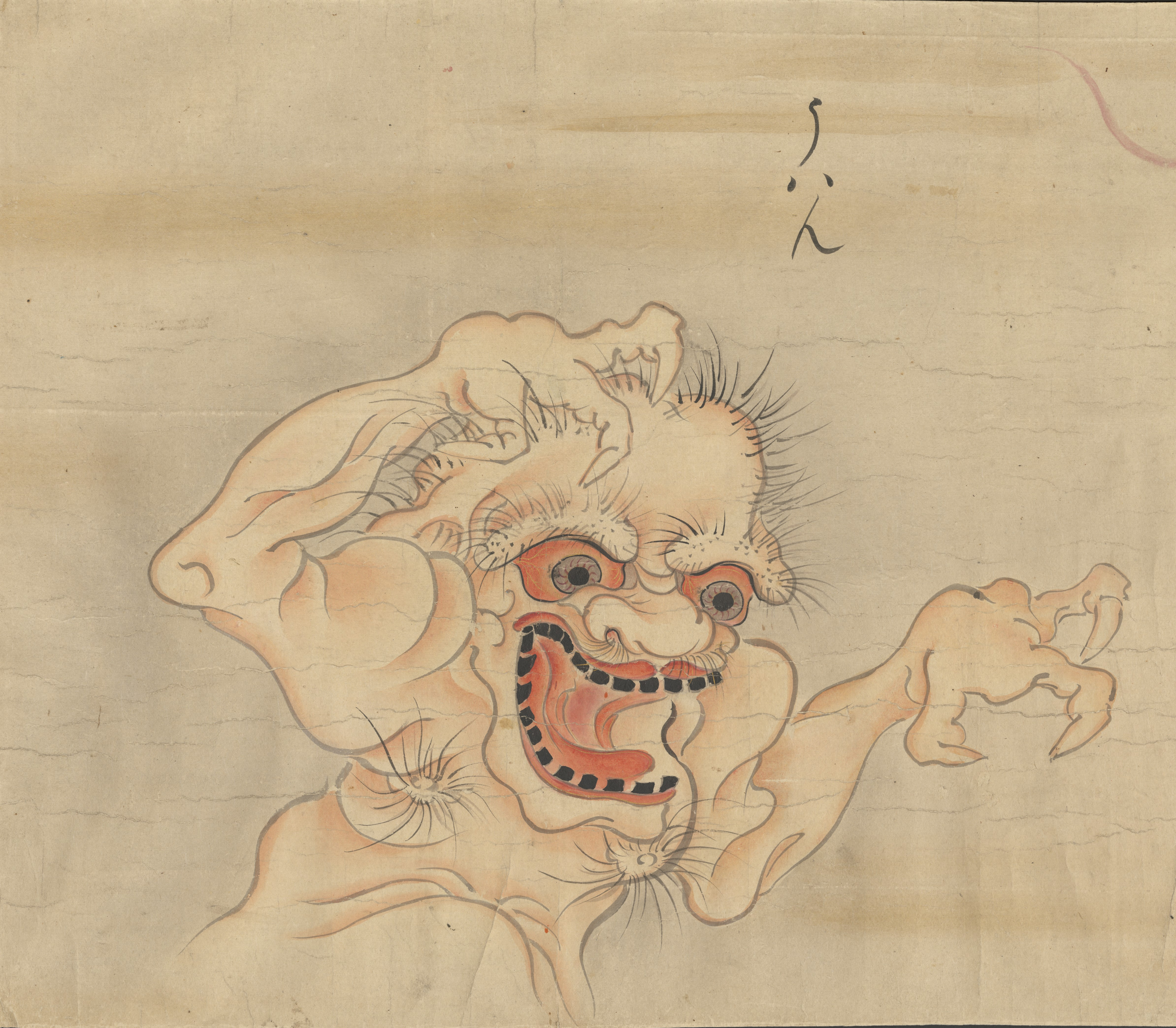
Uwan (うハん) from Bakemono no e (化物之繪, c. 1700), Harry F. Bruning Collection of Japanese Books and Manuscripts, L. Tom Perry Special Collections, Harold B. Lee Library, Brigham Young University.

An uwan (うわん) is a Japanese yōkai depicted in Edo Period pictures such as the Hyakkai Zukan by Sawaki Suushi and the Gazu Hyakki Yagyō by Sekien Toriyama.

== Concept ==
They were depicted to be a teeth-blackened yōkai with grotesque features who were waving both hands, and appeared to be looking threatening by raising their voice, but there was no explanatory text, so their true identity is unknown.

Teeth blackening was performed in medieval Japan among males of the nobility (kuge) and warrior class (buke), so it is inferred that they may be a yōkai of someone from this class, or alternatively they may come from how monsters in Omine, Aso District, Kumamoto Prefecture are called "wanwan" and how monsters in Taniyama, Kagoshima Prefecture (now Kagoshima) are called "wan". In the background of the picture in the Gazu Hyakki Yagyō, there is the interpretation that they are a paranormal phenomenon that appears from the walls of a deserted residence.

Also, in yōkai depictions, the uwan only has three fingers on its hands, so it is theorized that this refers to how oni have three fingers.

== Other theories ==
In the essay Tōhoku Kaidan no Tabi by Norio Yamada, there is the following strange tale (kaidan) in Aomori Prefecture from the end of the Edo Period. A man named Kasuke was saving money, so he bought some old residence and moved in with a woman, but at night, there continuously echoed a loud voice shouting "uwan!" that he was unable to sleep. The next morning, the two of them, eyes all red, complained about this voice saying uwan preventing them from sleep, but not one of their neighbors could hear such a voice, and it was rumored that they were not able to sleep simply because Kasuke was together with that woman all night. However, an elder who heard this tale said that it was because in this old residence lived a monster called "uwan." There are no primary sources provided for this mysterious tale, so it has been suggested that this was simply made up by Yamada.

There is also the theory that they would appear near old temples and let out a strange voice saying as their name suggest, "uwan!" and startle passer-bys and take their lives as they are distracted, but if one repeats back everything that was said to them, the uwan would flee. This comes from a children's book of strange tales, the Ichiban Kuwashii Nihon Yōkai Zukan (いちばんくわしい日本妖怪図鑑, "The Most Informed Japanese Yōkai Illustrated Reference") by Arifumi Satō, and the book Obake Zukan (お化け図絵, Illustrated Reference Book of Monsters) by Sanpei Kasu quotes this theory, but the primary source here is also unknown, and again, it has been suggested that this is simply made up by Satō.
