= Nuribotoke =

Yōkai

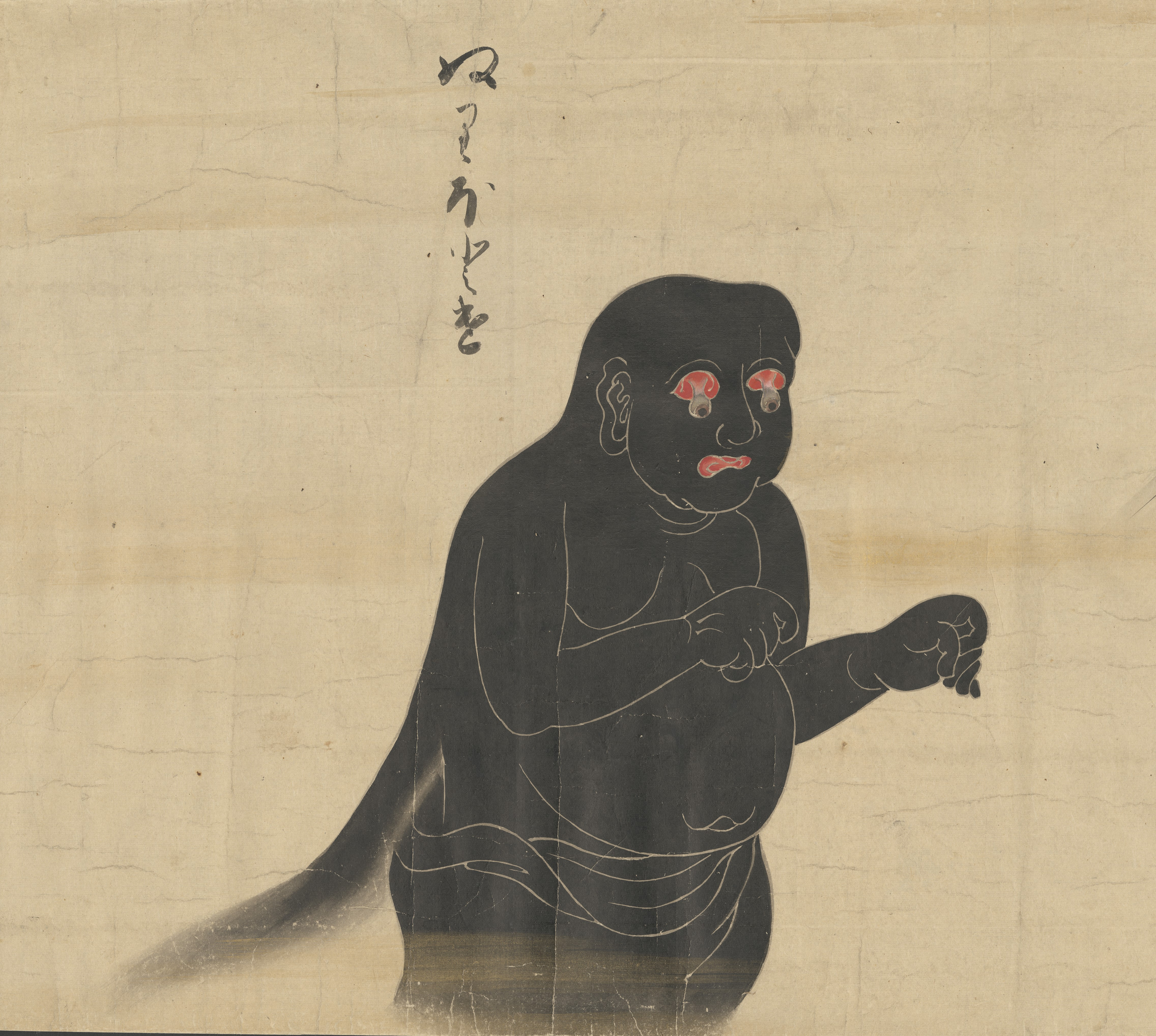
Nuribotoke ぬりぼとけ from Bakemono no e (化物之繪, c. 1700), Harry F. Bruning Collection of Japanese Books and Manuscripts, L. Tom Perry Special Collections, Harold B. Lee Library, Brigham Young University.

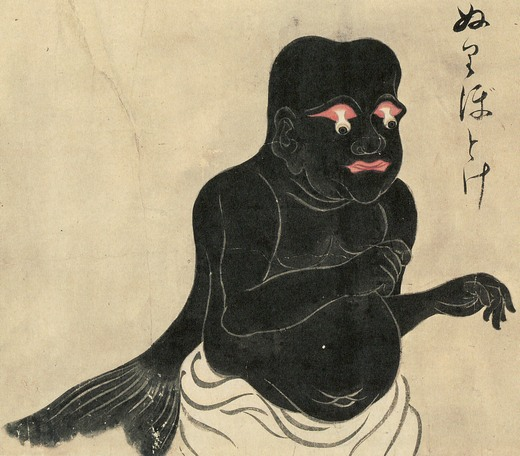
"Nuribotoke" (ぬりぼとけ) from the Hyakkai Zukan by Sawaki Suushi

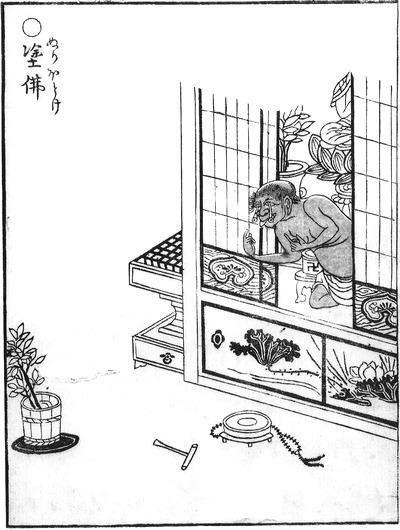
"Nuribotoke" (塗仏) from the Gazu Hyakki Yagyō by Sekien Toriyama

The Nuribotoke (塗仏) is a yōkai found in Japanese yōkai emaki such as the Hyakkai Zukan by Sawaki Suushi. They are also depicted in the Gazu Hyakki Yagyō by Toriyama Sekien.

They are depicted as an animated corpse with darkened skin and dangling eyeballs. Their name literally means "Lacquered Buddha" which references their black lacquered color and their resemblance to Buddha, although the term for Buddha can also be used to mean any deceased spirit. It has also sometimes been referred to as Kurobō (黒坊). They are often portrayed with largely bloated stomachs and appear often as a Buddhist priest.

== Concept ==
They have the appearance of a black bonze and they are depicted with both eyeballs out of their sockets and hanging down. None of the documents have any explanatory text, so it is unknown what kind of yōkai they were intending to depict.

In the emakimono and e-sugoroku of the Edo Period, such as the Jikkai Sugoroku (十界双六) (held by the National Diet Library), they are written as ぬりぼとけ or ぬり仏, and they are depicted with what appears to be long black hair on their backs. There are also examples such as in the Hyakkai Zukan where they are depicted with what appears to be a fish's tail on their backs. In the Gyōsai Hyakki Gadan (暁斎百鬼画談) (1889) by Kawanabe Kyōsai, there was a yōkai that was unnamed but had the same appearance as the "nuribotoke" of emakimono, with both eyeballs out the eyesockets.

In the Hyakki Yagyō Emaki (held by the Matsui Library), they are depicted under the name of kurobō (黒坊). They have the same appearance as the "nuribotoke" of the emakimono and e-sugoroku, with both eyes out of their eye sockets. In this emaki, the korobō appears as the very first of the yōkai.

According to the Edo Period writing Kiyū Shōran (嬉遊笑覧), it can be seen that one of the yōkai that it notes is depicted in the Bakemono E (化物絵) drawn by Kōhōgen Motonobu is one by the name of "nurihotoke."

In the Gazu Hyakki Yagyō by Sekien Toriyama, it is depicted appearing out from a butsudan (miniature shrine). Among all the pictures of the nuribotoke, only the one in the Gazu Hyakki Yagyō by Sekien Toriyama depicts it with a butsudan.

They are often depicted with a long, black appendage coming from their back, which is generally drawn as a catfish's tail, but is sometimes drawn as long black hair, especially in Edo period portrayals. They are believed to appear from butsudan that have either been left open overnight or have been poorly maintained. Often, they appear as a deceased family member in order to scare the family. However, as evidenced by the catfish tail, it may be that the corpse is controlled by another being or be a yōkai in disguise. Sometimes it will appear as a Buddhist priest and act as a messenger of the Buddha but give out false prophecies to fool worshipers. According to some stories, it may appear simply to maintain a butsudan that is in disrepair. It is also believed to dance often, especially during the demons' night parade (Hyakki Yakō).

=== Umibōzu ===
In the yōkai emaki considered to be made by inserting captions on yōkai pictures in preexisting yōkai emaki, the Bakemonozukushi Emaki (化け物尽し絵巻) (from the Edo Period, held by an individual, entrusted to the Fukuoka Prefecture library), there is a picture thought to be referenced from the "nuribotoke" that is introduced under the name of "umibōzu" (海坊主) (for unknown reasons, this emaki changes the names of all the yōkai that appear in it). According to the caption, this umibōzu appears at the inlet of Shido, Sanuki Province (now Kagawa Prefecture), and it would eat fishers and reduce them to mere bones, but many people devised a plan that allowed them to kill it.

== Explanatory text beginning in Shōwa ==
In literature about yōkai starting in the Shōwa and Heisei periods, there have started to appear various interpretations based on their name and appearance about how they'd suddenly appear from butsudan and frighten people by popping out their eyes, or how a slothful monk would appear out of the butsudan and attack people, among other interpretations. In the Yōkai Gadan Zenshū Nihonhen (妖怪画談全集 日本篇) (1929), Morihiko Fujisawa gave the caption "a nuribotoke oddity as a spirit of objects" to Sekien's "nuribotoke" picture that was included for illustration. It is also said that the eyes hanging down is meant to convey the idea of "what can the eyes of the people in a house with a dirty butsudan see? Those eyes can't see anything, can they now?" Because of this, they are considered to appear in houses with an untidy butsudan and startle people.

== See also ==
- Gazu Hyakki Yagyō
- List of legendary creatures from Japan
- Zombie
