= Nurarihyon =

Japanese yōkai

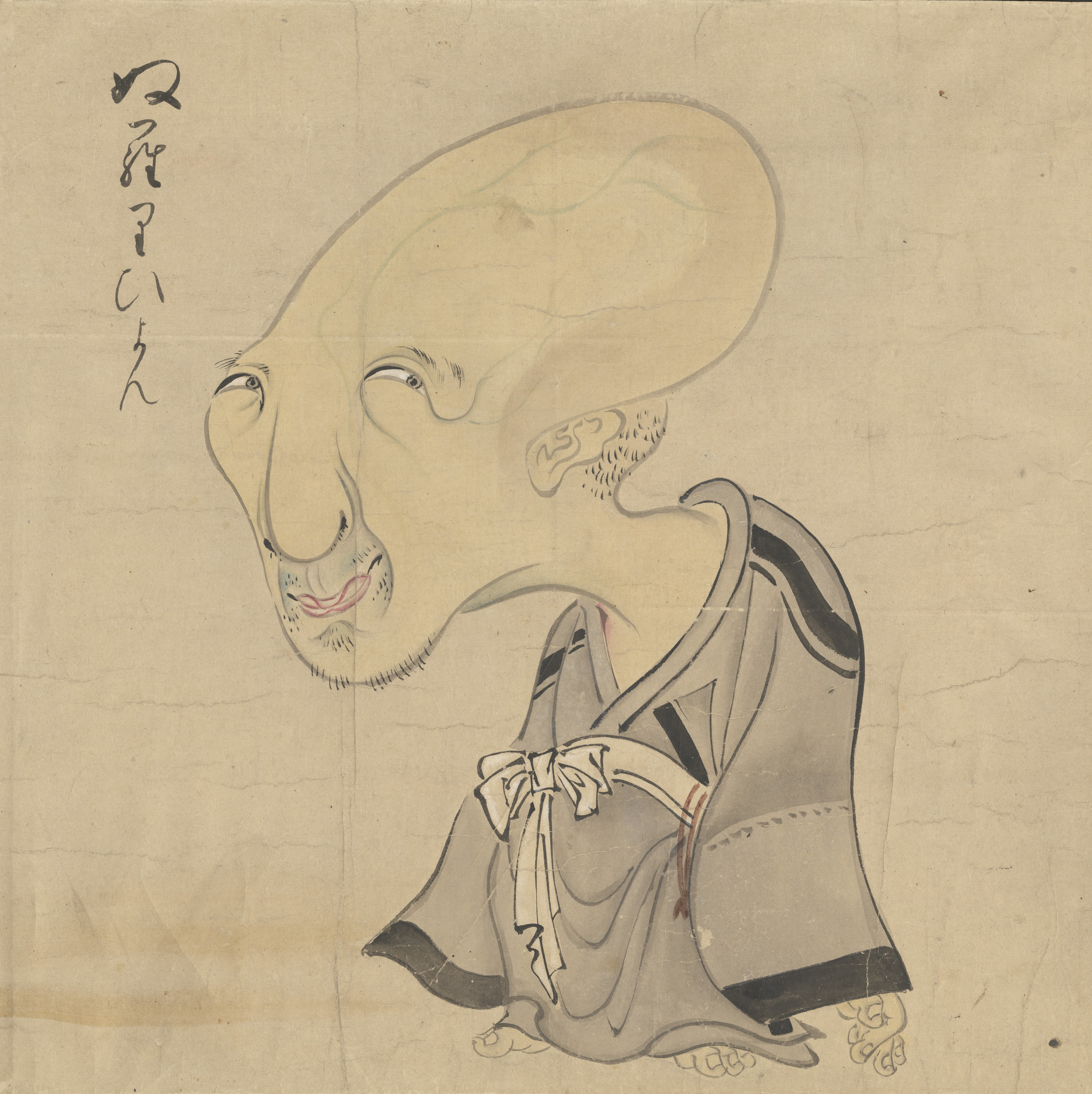
Nurarihyon (ぬらりひょん) from Bakemono no e (化物之繪, c. 1700), Harry F. Bruning Collection of Japanese Books and Manuscripts, L. Tom Perry Special Collections, Harold B. Lee Library, Brigham Young University.

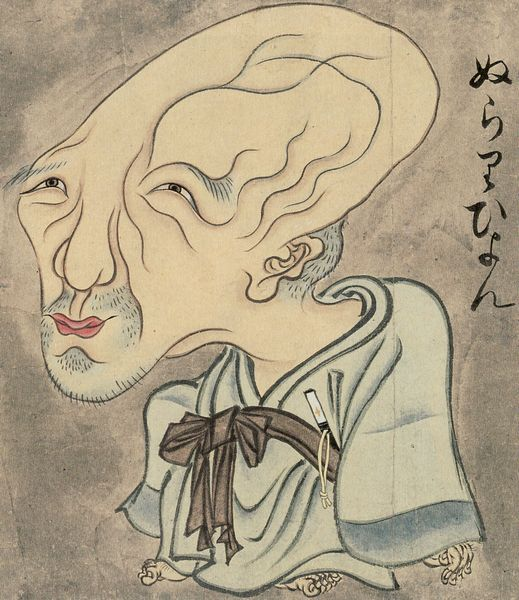
"Nurarihyon" from the Hyakkai Zukan by Sawaki Suushi

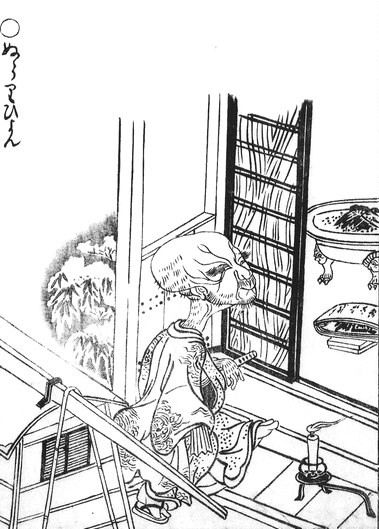
"Nūrihyon" (nurarihyon) from the Gazu Hyakki Yagyō by Toriyama Sekien

Nurarihyon (滑瓢 or ぬらりひょん) is a Japanese yōkai.

== Concept ==
Generally, like the hyōtannamazu, they are considered a monster that cannot be caught. One can find that it often appears in the yōkai emaki of the Edo Period, but any further details about it are unknown. In folktale legends, they are a member of the Hyakki Yagyō (in the Akita Prefecture), and there is a type of umibōzu in the Okayama prefecture that can be found under that name, but it is not clear whether they came before or after the "nurarihyon" in the pictures.

It has been thought that they are a "supreme commander of yōkai," but this has been determined to be simply a misinformed or common saying, as detailed in a later section.

== In yōkai pictures ==
In the Edo Period Japanese dictionary, the Rigen Shūran, there is only the explanation "monster painting by Kohōgen Motonobu." According to the Edo Period writing Kiyū Shōran (嬉遊笑覧), it can be seen that one of the yōkai that it notes is depicted in the Bakemono E (化物絵) drawn by Kōhōgen Motonobu is one by the name of "nurarihyon," and it is also depicted in the Hyakkai Zukan (1737, Sawaki Suushi) and the Hyakki Yagyō Emaki (1832, Oda Gōchō, in the Matsui Library), among many other emakimono. It is a bald old man with an elongated head, and depicted wearing either a kimono or a kasaya. Without any explanatory text, it is unclear what kind of yōkai they were intending to depict.

The Kōshoku Haidokusan (好色敗毒散), a ukiyo-zōshi published in the Edo Period gives the example, "its form was nurarihyon, like a catfish without eyes or mouth, the very spirit of lies," so it is known that it is word used with a meaning similar to noppera-bō but as an adjective.

The Gazu Hyakki Yagyō by Toriyama Sekien depicts a nurarihyon hanging down from a kago. Like the emakimono, this one has no explanatory text, so not many details are known, but the act of disembarking from a vehicle was called "nurarin," so it is thought that nurarihyon was a name given to a depiction of this. Furthermore, it is also theorized that this depicts the libertines who go to the red light district. Natsuhiko Kyōgoku and Katsumi Tada posit that "nurari" is an onomatopoeic word meaning the state of slipperiness, and "hyon" similarly means a strange or unexpected circumstances, which is why "nurarihyon" was the name given to a yōkai that was slippery (nurarikurari) because it cannot be caught. In the Gazu Hyakkai Yagyō, its name is written as "nūrihyon" but considering all the literature and emakimono before it, it is generally thought that this is simply a mistake.

From its appearance, it is also theorized that this yōkai was born because an old person was mistaken for a yōkai.

== Legends ==
Okayama Prefecture

According to Hirakawa Rinboku, in the legends of Okayama Prefecture, the nurarihyon is considered similar to umibōzu, and they are a round yōkai about as big as a human head that would float in the Seto Inland Sea, and when someone tries to catch it, it would sink and float back up over and over to taunt people. It is thought that they would go "nurari" (an onomatopoeia) and slip from the hands, and float back up with a "hyon" (an onomatopoeia), which is why they were given this name.

Presently, it is thought that these are portuguese man o' war, spotted jelly, and other large squid and octopuses that have been seen as yōkai, so it is thought that this is a different thing from the aforementioned nurarihyon that takes on the shape of an old person.

Akita Prefecture

In Yuki no Idewaji (雪の出羽路) (1814) in the Sugae Masumi Yūranki ("Sightseeing Records of Sugae Masumi") by the Edo Period traveler Sugae Masumi, there is the following passage:

If you pass by the Sae no Kamizaka at evening among other times in a leisurely stroll with a light drizzle and thick clouds, there would be a man who meets with a woman, the woman would meet with the man, and nurarihyon, otoroshi, nozuchi, among others would go on a hyakki yagyō, so some call it the bakemonozaka (monster hill).

In the same book is written that the "Sae no Kamizaka" (道祖ノ神坂) is in the town of Sakuraguchi, Inaniwa, Ogachi District Dewa Province (now the town of Inaniwa, Yuzawa, Akita Prefecture).

== Modern nurarihyon ==
Starting in the Shōwa, and Heisei eras, yōkai-related literature, children's books, and illustrated references note that the "nurarihyon" would enter people's homes in the evening when the people there are busy and then drink tea and smoke like it's their own home. It is explained that when they are seen, they would be thought of "as the owner of the house," so they wouldn't be chased away, or even noticed. They are also noted to be a "supreme commander of yōkai."

However, folk legends that mention these characteristics cannot be found in any examples or references, so the yōkai researchers, Kenji Murakami and Katsumi Tada posit that the thought of them coming into houses comes from the following passage in the Yōkai Gadan Zenshū Nihonhen Jō (妖怪画談全集 日本篇 上, "Discussion on Yōkai Pictures, Japan Volume, First Half") by Morihiko Fujisawa, where the following is written below Toriyama Sekien's illustration of the nurarihyon in that book:

While night is still approaching, the nurarihyon comes to visit as the chief monster.

Those two yōkai researchers posit that this caption resulted in the proliferation of this thought in later years, and that this was actually a made-up idea that came from an interpretation of Toriyama Sekien's picture. Murakami and Tada posit that in fact, Fujisawa's assertion that the "nurarihyon comes to visit as the chief monster" is nothing more than a big guess.

Also, in Wakayama Prefecture, stories where a nurarihyon appear were published to explain them, but those stories originate from a story titled "Nurarihyon" in the collection of writings, "Obake Bunko 2, Nurarihyon" (Library of Monsters 2: Nurarihyon) by Norio Yamada, and it is thought that this is also made-up.

Toward the end of the Shōwa period, on the basis of Fujisawa's interpretation given by the caption, the thought that they "come into one's home" or that they are a "supreme commander of yōkai" took a life of its own after Mizuki Shigeru and Arifumi Satō spread them through their own illustrated yōkai reference books, and in the animated television series, the 3rd "GeGeGe no Kitarō" (starting in 1985), a nurarihyon was the antagonist and arch-enemy of the main character Kitarō, and was a self-proclaimed "supreme commander," which altogether can be seen as things that made their perception as being "supreme commanders" even more famous.

The literary scholar Kunihiro Shimura states that all these above characteristics have made the legend stray far from its original meaning and made it artificially distorted. On the other hand, Natsuhiko Kyōgoku states that in his opinion, this yōkai is performing its function just fine in its present form so there is no problem, and that by understanding yōkai as a part of a living culture, he does not mind that they change to fit with the times. Natsuhiko Kyōgoku participated in the animated television series, the 4th "Gegege no Kitarō" as a guest writer for the 101st episode, but here, the nurarihyon would be in its original form, as an octopus.

They are also depicted as in Hell Teacher Nūbē as a ruined visitor god.

== Etymology ==
The name Nurarihyon is a portmanteau of the words "Nurari" (Japanese: ぬらり or 滑) meaning "to slip away" and "hyon" (Japanese: ひょん or 瓢), an onomatopoeia used to describe something floating upwards. In the name, the sound "hyon" is represented by the character for "gourd". The Nurarihyon is unrelated to another, similarly named ocean Yōkai from Okayama Prefecture.

== Appearance and behaviour ==
The Nurarihyon is usually depicted as an old man with a gourd-shaped head and wearing a kesa. In some depictions he also carries a single sword rather than the standard two to demonstrate his wealth. There is speculation that in Toriyama Sekien's portrayal of Nurarihyon, he serves as a political cartoon to represent the aristocracy. Others suggest that he is retired from a samurai family due to the sword and his clothing style.

The Nurarihyon is often depicted sneaking into people's houses while they are away, drinking their tea, and acting as if it is their own house. However, this depiction is not one based in folklore, but one based on hearsay and repeated in popular Yōkai media.

== See also ==
- GeGeGe no Kitarō
- List of legendary creatures from Japan
- Nura: Rise of the Yokai Clan
