= Furaribi =

Yōkai

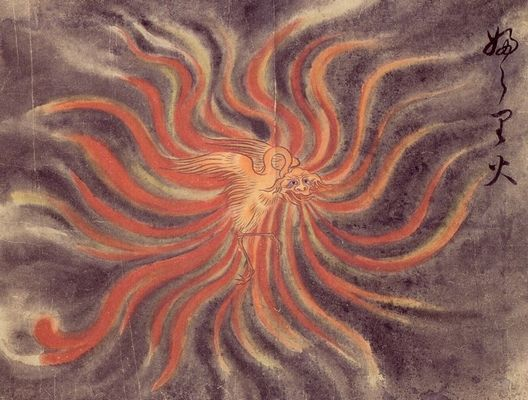
Furaribi (ふらり火) from the Hyakkai Zukan by Sawaki Suushi

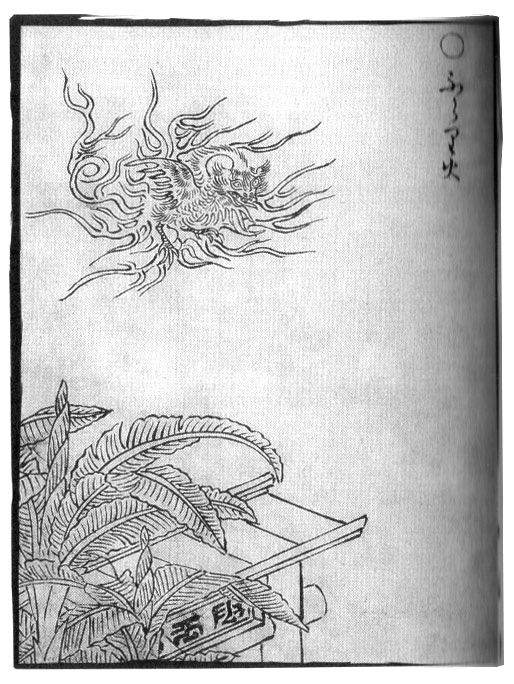
Furaribi (ふらり火) from the Gazu Hyakki Yagyō by Sekien Toriyama

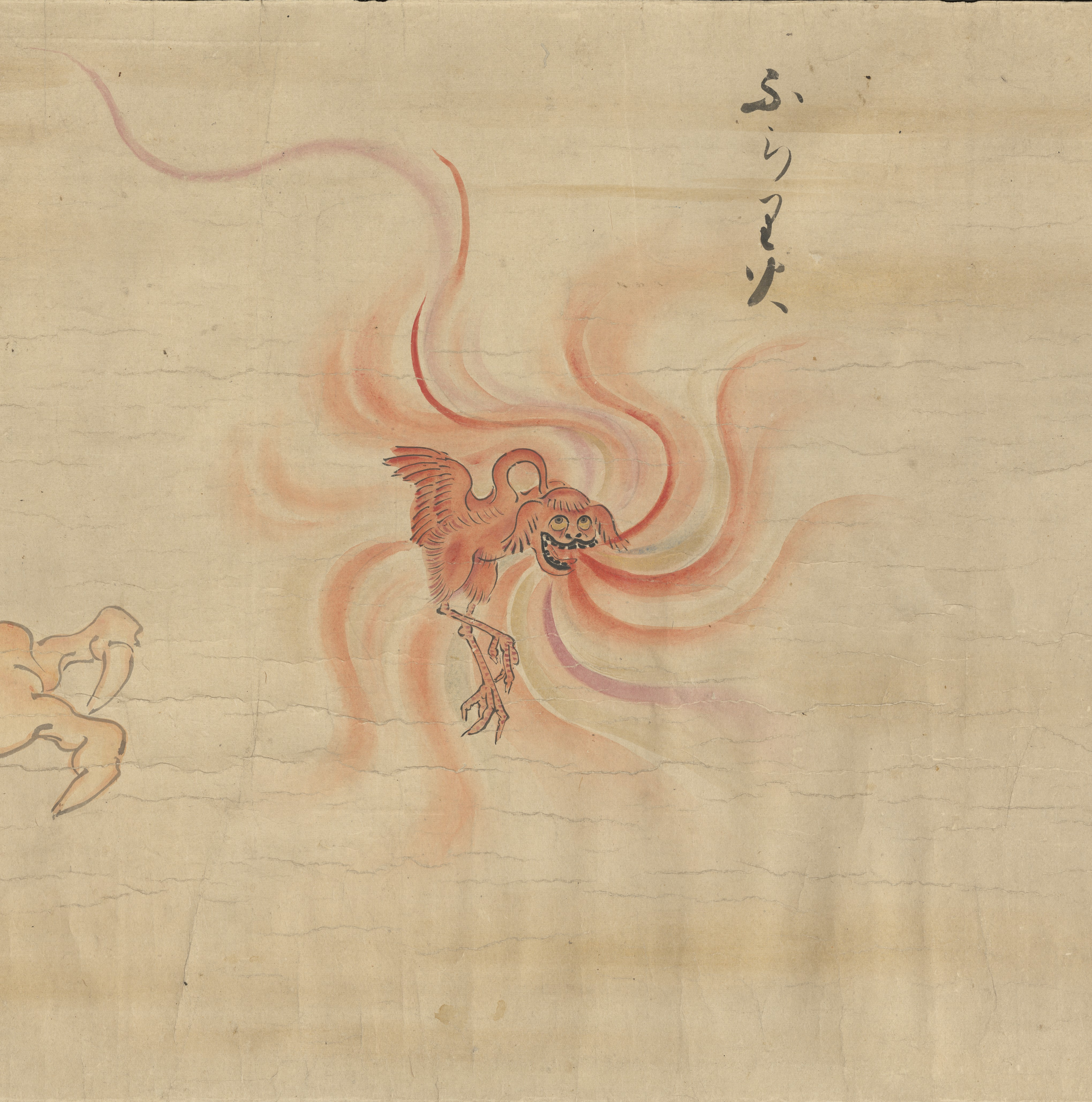
Furaribi (ふらり火) from Bakemono no e (化物之繪, c. 1700), Harry F. Bruning Collection of Japanese Books and Manuscripts, L. Tom Perry Special Collections, Harold B. Lee Library, Brigham Young University.

The furaribi (ふらり火) is a fire yōkai that appears in Japanese classical yōkai pictures such as in the Gazu Hyakki Yagyō by Sekien Toriyama, the Hyakkai Zukan by Sawaki Suushi, and the Bakemonozukushi by an unknown author.

== Concept ==
In the Hyakkai Zukan and Bakemonozukushi among others, they are depicted as birds with a dog-like face and enveloped in fire. The one in the Gazu Hyakki Yagyō is also a bird enveloped in fire, but the face on this one is reminiscent of Garuda of Hindu mythology.

Due to the lack of explanatory text, it is unclear what kind of yōkai all of these were depicting, but there is the theory that they are the incarnations of fire that are the result of the deceased who were not given a memorial and thus wandered the present world as spirits and over time changed in appearance into what is depicted.

== Similar tales ==
Similar to the furaribi, at Isobezutsumi, the river basin of the Jinzū River in the town of Isobe, Toyama, Toyama Prefecture, there is the legend of the "buraribi" that appeared at the beginning of the Meiji era.

It was in the era of Tenshō. Sassa Narimasa, lord of the Toyama Castle, had a mistress named Sayuri. Sayuri was very beautiful and received much affection from Narimasa, resulting in distant relations between her and the okujochū (ladies in waiting) of the castle. One time, some of the okujochū falsely spoke of how Sayuri was committing adultery with a man other than Narimasa. Narimasa took this seriously, and killed Sayuri as a result of tremendous love-hate, hung her from a tree in Isobezutsumi, and sliced her into pieces. Sayuri's entire family was also executed for this. The innocent family of 18 who were about to be killed gave Narimasa a curse as they died.

It is said that after that, every night on this land there would appear atmospheric ghost lights that were called "buraribi" or "sayuribi", and if one calls out to this fire saying "Sayuri, Sayuri", a woman's severed head with disheveled hair would appear with a bitter expression. The fact that the Sassashi family lost to Toyotomi Hideyoshi in battle is also told to be the deed of Sayuri's vengeful spirit.

== See also ==
- Firebird
- Phoenix
