= Amikiri =

Type of Japanese Yōkai

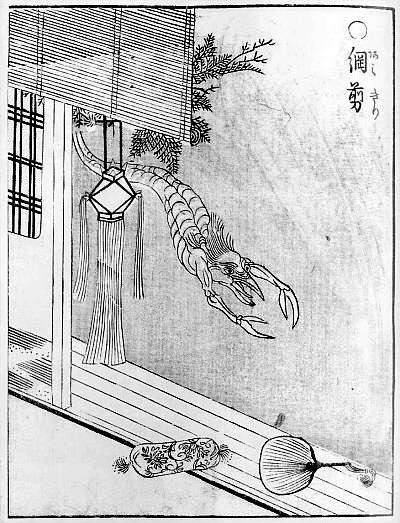
"Amikiri" (網切) from the Gazu Hyakki Yagyō by Toriyama Sekien.

Amikiri (網(あみ)切(きり)/網剪; lit. "net cutter") is a Japanese yōkai depicted in the Gazu Hyakki Yagyō by Toriyama Sekien.

== Concept ==
The illustration of the amikiri in Toriyama Sekien (1712‐1788)'s Gazu Hyakki Yagyō (published 1776) depicts a scorpion-like creature (or a cross between a serpent, bird or a lobster with pincer claws similar to that of a crab or a scorpion), but since Sekien supplies no explanatory text, it is not certain what kind of yōkai it is. It may be an off-shoot based on another similar yōkai named kamikiri ("hair-cutter"), which Sekien does not include in his series, but occurs in predecessor Sawaki Sūshi (1707‐1772)'s emaki painting scroll Hyakkai zukan (1737), from which Sekien is known to have borrowed heavily.

In various writings from the Shōwa period and beyond, (Note: In the early Shōwa (1920s), Morihiko Fujisawa (1926) mentions amikiri but only in passing, while listing a number of Sekien's monsters. either passingly mentions the amikiri,) or describes the amikiri to be a yōkai that cuts mosquito nets, sudare blinds, or nets/meshes hung out to dry.

There may be no authentic folkloric tradition about amikiri, and this yōkai may merely be Sekien's invention, perhaps based on play on words or some allegory more easily recognizable to people at the time. The yōkai researcher Katsumi Tada hypothesized that Sekien perhaps seized on the pun (double entendre) between "ami" (meaning nets) and "ami" (meaning mysid shrimp) when he invented the creature. (Note: But since mysid shrimp do not possess pincer forearms, some question the notion that mysid shrimp could inspire the drawing.)

== Legend ==
In Norio Yamada's Tōhoku Kaidan no Tabi ("Ghost story journey to the Tōhoku region", 1974), there is a story taking place in the Shōnai region, Yamagata Prefecture about a fishing village whose fishing nets were repeatedly cut into pieces, which got blamed on the amikiri. One person preemptively brought back his nets early and hid at home to avoid the trouble, but his mosquito nets all got cut to tatters (no doubt by the amikiri) and the residents got bitten all over the body by mosquitos. The yōkai researcher Kenji Murakami was unable to corroborate such a story from any other source in Yamagata Prefecture, and concluded it must have been Yamada's invention.

== See also ==
- Kamikiri
- List of legendary creatures from Japan
