= Hyōsube =

Yōkai

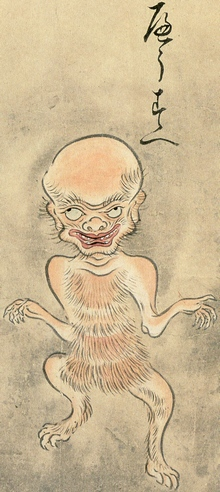
"Hyōsube" (へうすへ) from the Hyakkai Zukan by Sawaki Suushi

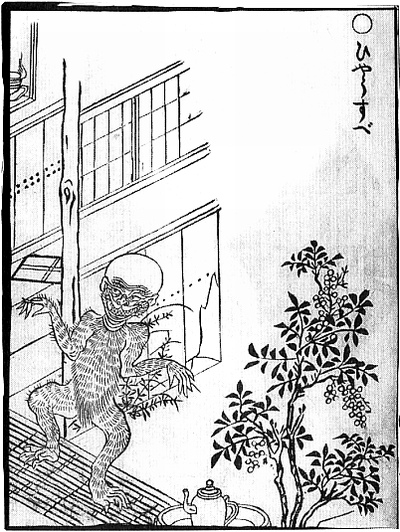
"Hyōsube" (ひやうすべ) from the Gazu Hyakki Yagyō by Sekien Toriyama

Hyōsube (ひょうすべ) is a Japanese yōkai. There are legends about them in many areas such as Saga Prefecture and Miyazaki Prefecture.

It is a child-sized river monster from Kyūshū that lives in underwater caves. It prefers to come out at night and loves to eat eggplants. It is a cousin of the supernatural yōkai in kappa folklore.

== Origin ==
They are said to be the companions of kappa, and they have alternate names of kappa and gawappa in the Saga Prefecture and gaataro in the Nagasaki Prefecture, but it is also said that legends about them are even older than ones about kappa.

They are said to have originated from Binzhushen (兵主神), the later name for Chiyou, and there are considered to be legends of them together with the Hata clan among other returnees. Originally revered as battle gods, in Japan they eventually came to acquire faith as food gods, and they are currently enshrined in places like Yasu, Shiga Prefecture and Tanba, Hyōgo Prefecture where there are shrines called Hyōzu Jinja (兵主神社).

There are several hypotheses on the origin of their name, and besides the later mentioned Hyōbu-taifu (兵部大輔), it is also said they got their name from the "hyou hyou" (flapping) sounds they cry out when going back and forth along mountain streams during Higan.

== Legends by area ==
In Katei 3 (1237), the military commander Tachibana no Kiminari moved from Iyo Province (now Ehime Prefecture) to Take, Saga Prefecture and constructed a shrine on the summit of the mountain behind Shiomi Jinja, but his follow Hyōsube (兵主部) was also said to have moved to the Shiomi river, and nowadays the god enshrined at Shiomi Jinja is considered to be Shibuy's follower, Hyōsube. Also, in the past during Kasuga Jinja's construction, the artisans at that time used a secret method to give life to a doll which provided labor in the shrine's construction, but after the shrine's completion, the unneeded doll was thrown away into a river and turned into a kappa to cause harm to people, and the First assistant to the Minister (Hyōbu-taifu), Shimada Maru quelled it, which is why it is said that the kappa has come to be called Hyōsube.

The chief priest of Shiomi Jinja, the Mōri family, and to ward off water disasters and kappa, there is the phrase "Hyōsube, forget not the promise, the one who stands at this river is a child of the old Sugawara" (兵主部よ約束せしは忘るなよ川立つをのこ跡はすがわら). It is said that this comes from how in Kyushu, Sugawara no Michizane, who was demoted to the position of Dazaifu (Kyushu regional government) saved a kappa, who then made a promise not to harm Michizane's family, so the phrase means "Hyōsube and all, do not forget the promise. This man great at swimming is a descendant of Sugawara no Michizane."

There are also the alternate names of Hyōsue, Hyōsubo, Hyōsunbo, Hyōsunbe, etc.

== Characteristics ==
Although kappa are often said to like cucumbers, Hyōsube are said to like eggplants, and there is a tradition of putting a spear through a fresh eggplant and setting it upright on a field to offer to the Hyōsube.

It is also sometimes thought that they would spread diseases to people, and it is said that those who see Hyōsube would be afflicted with a fever of unknown cause, and this fever causing disease would even spread to the other people around. There is also a story about a woman who saw Hyōsube ravaging an eggplant field who subsequently had an illness that cause her entire body to become purple, which eventually led to her death.

Also, Hyōsube are considered to have an extremely hairy appearance, and it is said that they would sneak into private residences and enter their baths, and soaking in the bath, the bathtub would have a ton of hair floating on top, and horses that touch the bath would die. There is also a similar tale where Hyō would come soak in the bath almost every night at a medicinal bathing establishment, and after Hyōsube soaks in the bath, the bath would have its entire surface covered with hair making it stinky, which is why the bath was later purposefully drained, but as a result, the horse that was being raised at the bathing establishment was killed.

In literature, if Hyōsube laughs, then laughing too from this results in death. This is said to originally be from Satō Arifumi's writing, Ichiban Kuwashii Nihon Yōkai Zukan (いちばんくわしい日本妖怪図鑑). According to this book, upon encountering with someone, Hyōsube would laugh "hee hee hee," and if that other person also laughs from this, they would get a fever and die, but it's been suggested that this is an idea that Hyōsube simply made up.

In yōkai depictions from the Edo Period such as by Toriyama Sekien among others, they have a very hairy appearance as in the legends, a bald head, and making a humorous pose as if they had already eaten someone. This appearance has been said to have been modeled after the Southeast Asian Gibbon.

== Origin ==
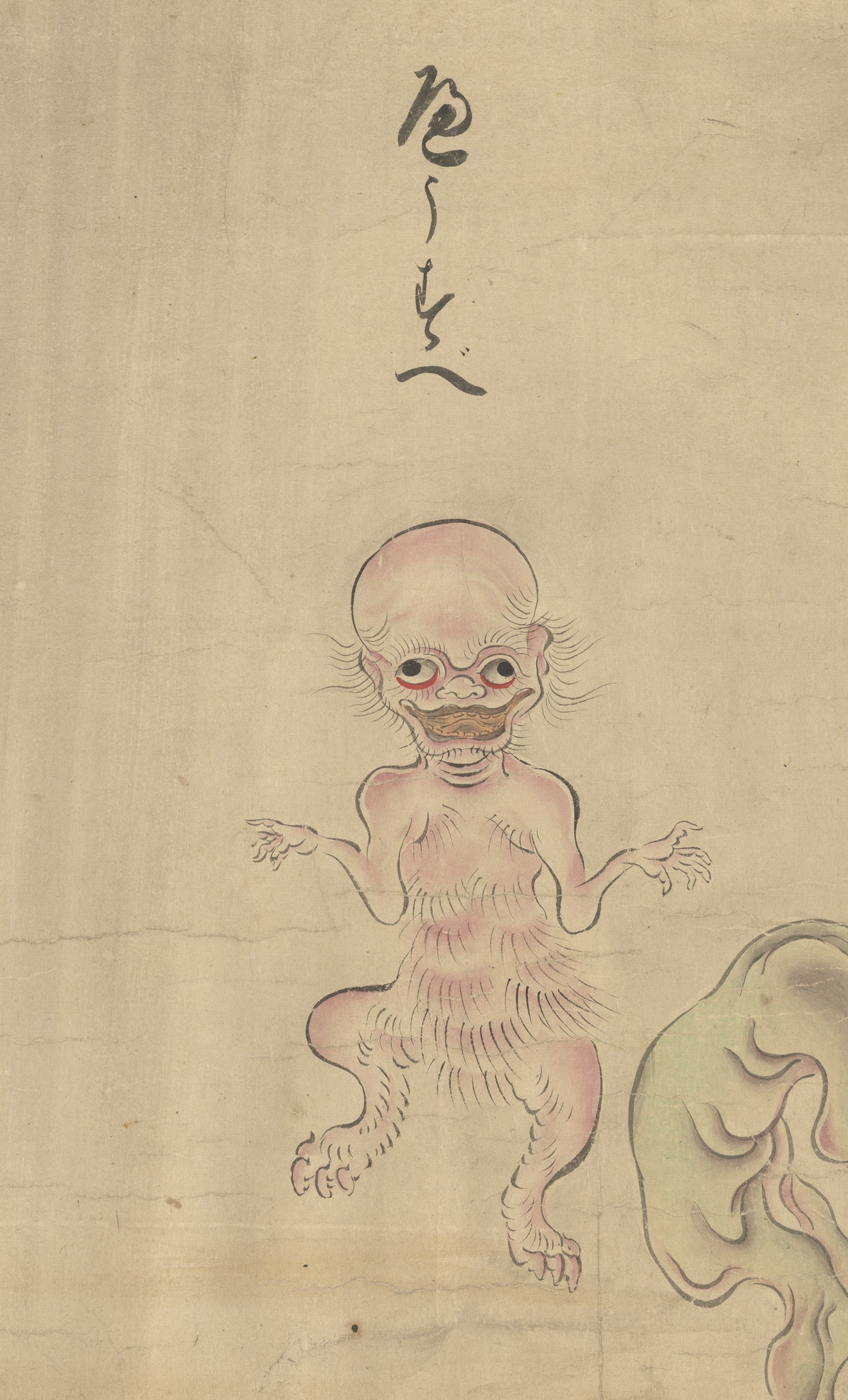
Hyōsube (Japanese: へうすべ) from Bakemono no e (Chinese: 化物之繪, c. 1700), Harry F. Bruning Collection of Japanese Books and Manuscripts, L. Tom Perry Special Collections, Harold B. Lee Library, Brigham Young University.

Hyōsube were dolls that were brought to life by a magician and used to build a shrine. After the shrine was finished they were dumped in a river. They were believed to be named after Hyōbu-taifu. They are found generally in Saga Prefecture and Miyazaki Prefecture in Kyūshū.

== Description ==
Hyōsube are small creatures with hairy bodies and bald heads, sharp teeth, and long claws. They live in rivers but like to come out at night and get into people's bathtubs. Once they are done using the bathtubs, they leave them smelly and covered in greasy hair.
