= Gagoze =

Japanese folkloric creature

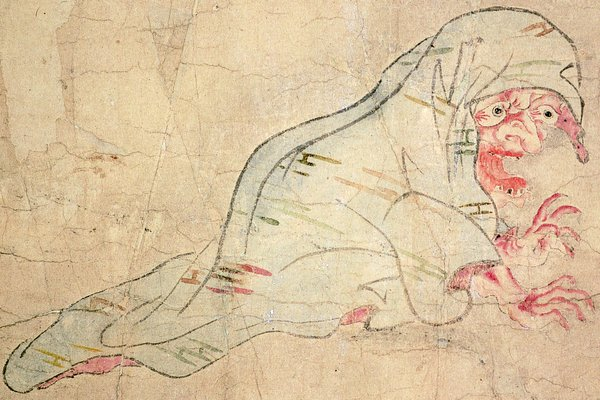
"Gagoze" (がごぜ) from the Bakemonozukushi (化物づくし), author unknown.

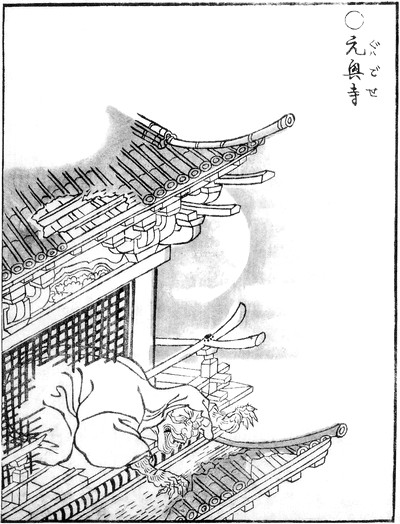
Gagoze (元興寺) from the Gazu Hyakki Yagyō by Sekien Toriyama

Gagoze (元興寺), also gagoji, guwagoze, gangō, and gangōji no oni (元興寺の鬼, the oni of gangōji) is a yōkai said to have appeared at Gangō-ji in the Nara Prefecture around the Asuka period. It can also be found in the text of the Heian period Nihon Ryōiki (in the story, 雷の憙を得て生ま令めし子の強き力在る縁," On a Boy of Great Strength Who Was Born of the Thunder’s Rejoicing"), the Honchō Monzui, among others. In classical yōkai drawings such as the Gazu Hyakki Yagyō by Toriyama Sekien, it is depicted as an oni with the appearance of a monk.

== Concept ==
It was the era of Emperor Bidatsu. In the town of Katawa, Aichi District, Owari Province (now near Furuwatari, Naka-ku, Nagoya, Aichi Prefecture), a certain peasant had a run in with a lightning strike. The lightning spirit (Raijin) who came down with the lightning rapidly changed form into that of a child. As the peasant was about to kill the raijin with a rod, the raijin begged for mercy and said that there would be repayment for sparing its life, that the peasant would be blessed with a strong child like the raijin. The peasant acceded to this request and upon making a boat from kusunoki wood, the raijin went aboard it while watching over the peasant as it lifted into the air, as the raijin returned to the skies on it together with clouds and thunder.

Eventually, the peasant's wife gave birth to what could only be said to be the raijin's heaven-sent child. The child had an abnormal appearance, with snakes around the head and a tail hanging from the back of its head. As the raijin said, this child had enormous strength since birth, and by the age of 10, could boast enough power to win against a famous prince of the royal family in a contest of strength.

Later, the child became an attendant at Gangō-ji. Just then, the attendants at the Gangō-ji bell tower began strangely dying almost every night, and there was a rumor that they were killed by an oni. The attendant said they would catch the oni themself, and went out to slay the oni. The attendants prepared beforehand to cover the lights in the four corners of the bell tower with a lid so that when the four attendants caught the oni, they would open the lid and see the oni with their own eyes. As they staked out one night at the bell tower, the oni appeared at early dawn, and they caught its hair and were dragged around. The four attendants were so terrified, they fled without opening the lids. When dawn came, the oni had its head hair completely torn off, and ran away. As they followed the blood trail, they eventually arrived at the grave of a ruffian manservant who used to work at Gangō-ji. As it turned out, this manservant's dead spirit turned into and appeared as a demonic spirit. The demonic spirit's head hair then became Gangō-ji's treasure. It is said that the attendant later continued to use this enormous strength and had a tokudo shukke, and became a dōjō-hōshi (a priest ranking).

Tetsuo Yamaori, in a thesis on the true nature of the concepts in old Japanese gods (kami), took note of the worldview in the background of this story. Observing that the first half involved lightning turning into a "small child" and then immediately ascending back to the sky, and that the latter half had a "demonic spirit" that would only appear at night and whose true form cannot be checked without getting close to a light, Yamaori notes that this is a clear show of how spiritual beings originally had a very self-concealing nature.

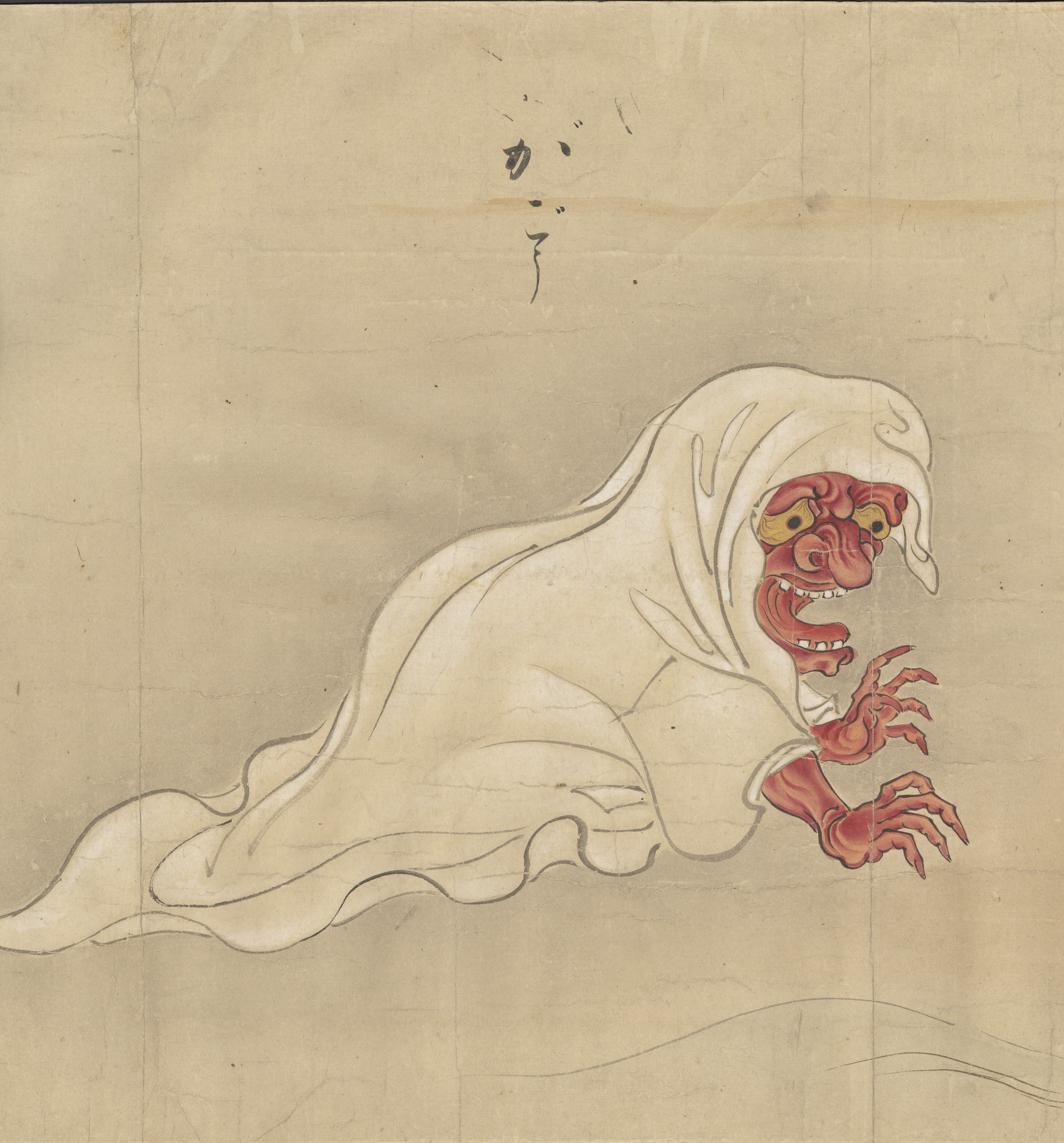
Gagō (がごう) Bakemono no e (化物之繪, c. 1700), Harry F. Bruning Collection of Japanese Books and Manuscripts, L. Tom Perry Special Collections, Harold B. Lee Library, Brigham Young University.

Old books from the Edo Period note that this Gagoze is the origin of how children would use the word "gagoze" and "gagoji" to mean monsters in general, and in fact, "gagoze, '"gagoji," gangoji," among others, are widely used in Japan among children to mean yōkai in general. However, the folklorist Kunio Yanagita denies this supposition and instead posits that this comes from how monsters would say "kamou zo" (咬もうぞ, I'll bite ya) as they appear.

== See also ==
- List of legendary creatures from Japan
