= Akashita =

Yōkai

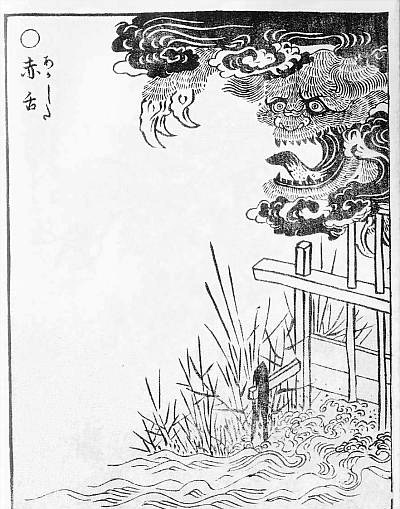
"Akashita" (赤舌) from the Gazu Hyakki Yagyō by Toriyama Sekien

Akashita (赤(あか)舌(した); lit. "red tongue") is a Japanese yōkai that appears in yōkai emaki in the Edo Period, among other places. They are depicted as a beast with clawed hands and a very hairy face covered with dark clouds, but its full body appearance is unknown. In its opened mouth is a big tongue. Sekien did not attach an explanatory note about this yōkai, but its origins are identifiable as Akaguchi which appears in older Edo period yōkai scrolls such as Bakemono no e. This yōkai is known interchangeably as Akaguchi and Akashita.

== Origin theory ==
Usually, they are not depicted accompanied with anything other than a black cloud, but in the Gazu Hyakki Yagyō by Toriyama Sekien, they are depicted on top of a sluice. However, there is no accompanying explanation, so details about it are unknown. Concerning the name "akashita", the modern literary scholar Atsunobu Inada among others suggest that they are related to the shakuzetsujin (赤舌神) and shakuzetsunichi (赤舌日), who protect the western gate of Tai Sui (Jupiter) as explained by onmyōdō.

In the Edo Period e-sugoroku, the Jikkai Sugoroku (at the National Diet Library) and the emakimono Hyakki Yagyō Emaki (Oda Gōchō, 1832), they are depicted by the name "akashita", but in depictions closer to the later mentioned "Akaguchi", it is depicted differently from Sekien's picture, and there is no depiction of a sluice.

Concerning how there is a sluice depicted in the picture in the Gazu Hyakki Yagyō by Toriyama Sekien, the yōkai researcher Katsumi Tada and yōkai journalist Kenji Murakami posit that this is one kind of picture explanation by Sekien. According to them, the "aka" (red) can be understood as "aka" (淦, bilge water, the water that collects on the bottom of ships) and "aka" (垢, filth), so it is a metaphor for dirtiness, and the "shita" (tongue) can be understood as "shita" (下, down, in this case meaning the depths of one's mind), so it can be understood as the popular saying "the tongue (shita) is the gate to calamities", so the akashita is a type of rasetsu god, so the picture is likely saying that as long as one's mouth is open, one will never be blessed with good fortune.

== Akaguchi ==
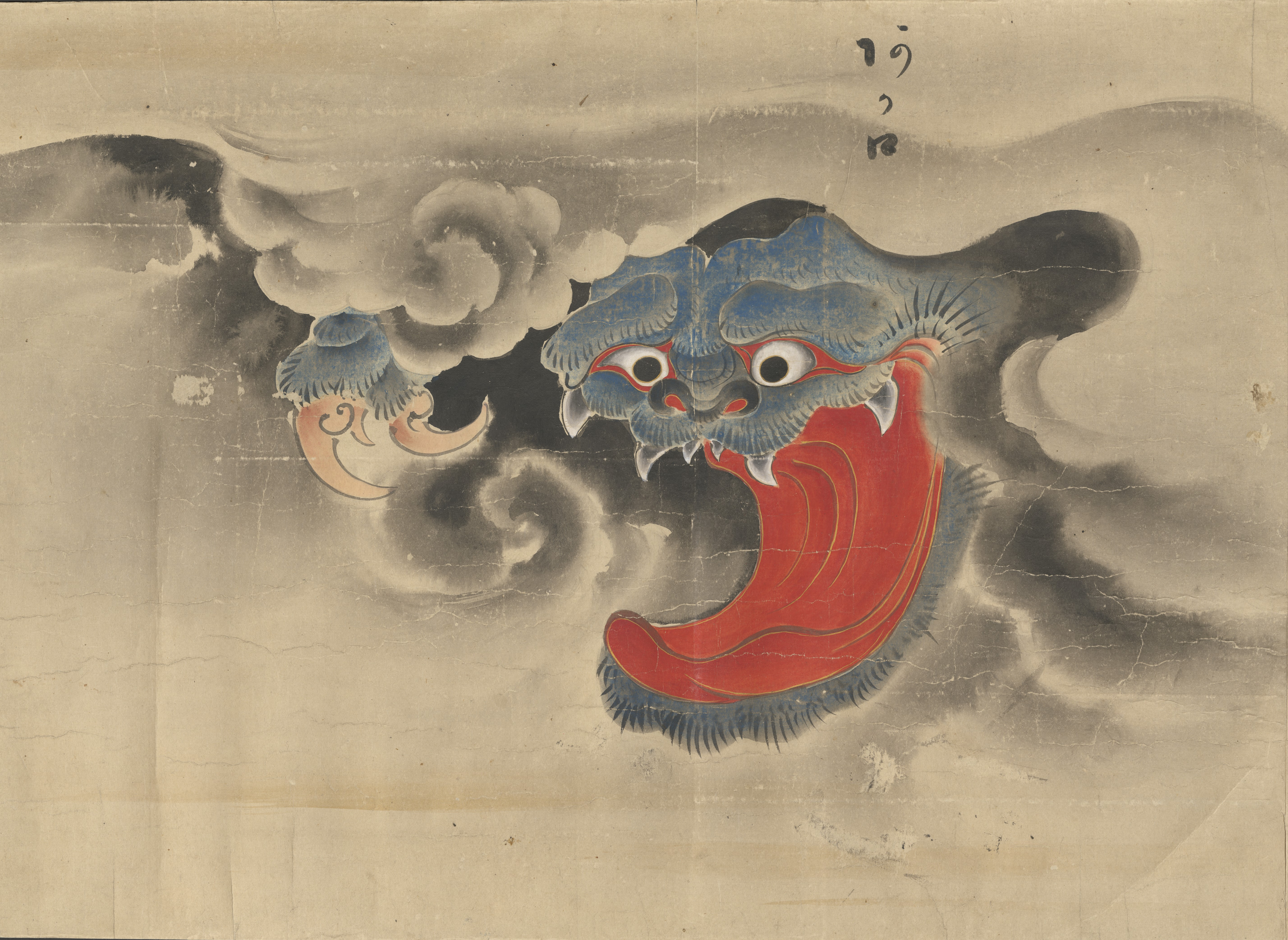
Akaguchi (Akashita), bakemono no e, Brigham Young University

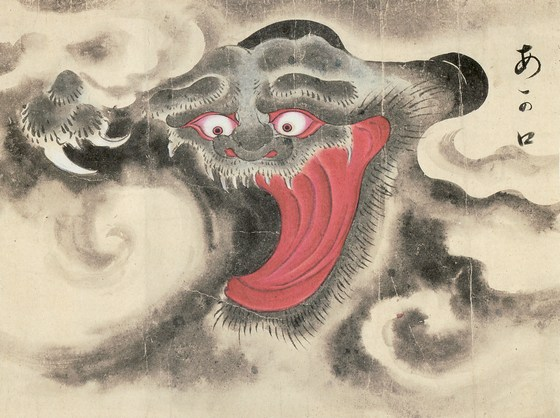
"Akaguchi" (あか口) from the Hyakkai Zukan by Sawaki Suushi

In the Edo Period yōkai emaki Hyakkai Zukan (Sawaki Suushi, 1737), the Bakemonozukushi (author and year unknown, held by Kagaya Rei), the Bakemono Emaki (author and year unknown, at the Kawasaki City Museum), there is a yōkai depicted called the "akaguchi" (赤口 or あか口) that appears to be modeled after the "akashita" drawn by Sekien. They have a wide open red mouth (including the tongue), the clawed hands, the hairy face, which are points of commonality with the beast depicted as covered with black clouds in the Jikkai Sugoroku and the "akashita" of Sekien. They do not depict a sluice.

According to the Edo Period writing Kiyū Shōran (嬉遊笑覧), it can be seen that one of the yōkai that it notes is depicted in the Bakemono E (化物絵) drawn by Kōhōgen Motonobu is one by the name of "akaguchi."

Concerning "akaguchi", Katsumi Tada favors the idea that they come from the shakkō / shakku (赤口) of the rokuyō (六曜, a system of lucky and unlucky days).

== Expositions in the Shōwa period ==
In literature starting from Shōwa, several explanations about the akashita have come up in publications, but other than by appearance, they all appear unrelated to the one in the emakimono and by Sekien. The following is a rough summary of these.

=== Morihiko Fujisawa's notes ===
In the Yōkai Gadan Zenshū Nihon Hen (妖怪画談全集 日本篇) (1929) by the folklore scholar Morihiko Fujisawa, besides Sekien's picture of the "akashita" published for illustration, there is the following caption:

The thing that arrives and opens the gates to wash away the fields of evildoers is mainly that odd thing, akashita (何物か至りて関口を開き悪業の田を流す其主怪こそ赤舌なり)

essentially stating that it washes away the fields of evildoers. This caption does not come from Sekien or any old literature, but is Fujisawa's own original interpretation of the picture.

=== Arifumi Satō's explanatory text ===
In the illustrated yōkai references Yōkai Daizukan (妖怪大図鑑, Big Illustrated Yōkai Reference) (1973) and Yōkai Daizenka (妖怪大全科) among others by Arifumi Satō, there is the explanation that they are a yōkai that would stick out their tongues from the red sky on evenings and kidnap people. They state that the families of those people kidnapped by an akashita would later prosper, among other things, but nothing that indicates such a legend exists can be found from Sekien or old literature.

=== Tōhoku Kaidan no Tabi ===
The Tōhoku Kaidan no Tabi (1974) by Norio Yamada writes that an Akaguchi appeared at a farming village in the Tsugaru region in the Aomori Prefecture and resolved a dispute over water for the fields. Starting in the Shōwa era, the story about an Akaguchi appearing in the Tsugaru region was widely used in yōkai illustrated references or yōkai themed books among other publications, and all of them refer back to this story.

It is understood that the story about an akashita resolving a water dispute is based on a legend at this place of a water dispute that got resolved, but with Sekien's "akashita" later retrofitted into the story.

== Concept ==
Akaguchi has association with the use of water in farming country. Though some sources say Akaguchi is simply an omen of bad luck, others represent Akaguchi as a protective spirit. During droughts, water is carefully controlled and distributed equally to farmers in the area. As a form of warfare, some would siphon above the allotted amount of water for their personal fields. This was a great crime and could cost neighboring farmers their livelihood. It was believed that the perpetrators of this crime not punished by law would be punished by Akaguchi. If these criminals came near the floodgate Akaguchi would appear and swallow them, scooping them up with its giant red tongue.

The name Akashita may be correlated to shakuzetsujin (赤舌神; lit. "red-tongued god") which guards the western gate of Jupiter. It may also be related to the shakuzetsunichi (赤舌日), a day of bad luck in Onmyōdō.
