= Kamikiri (haircutting) =

Hair-cutting yokai

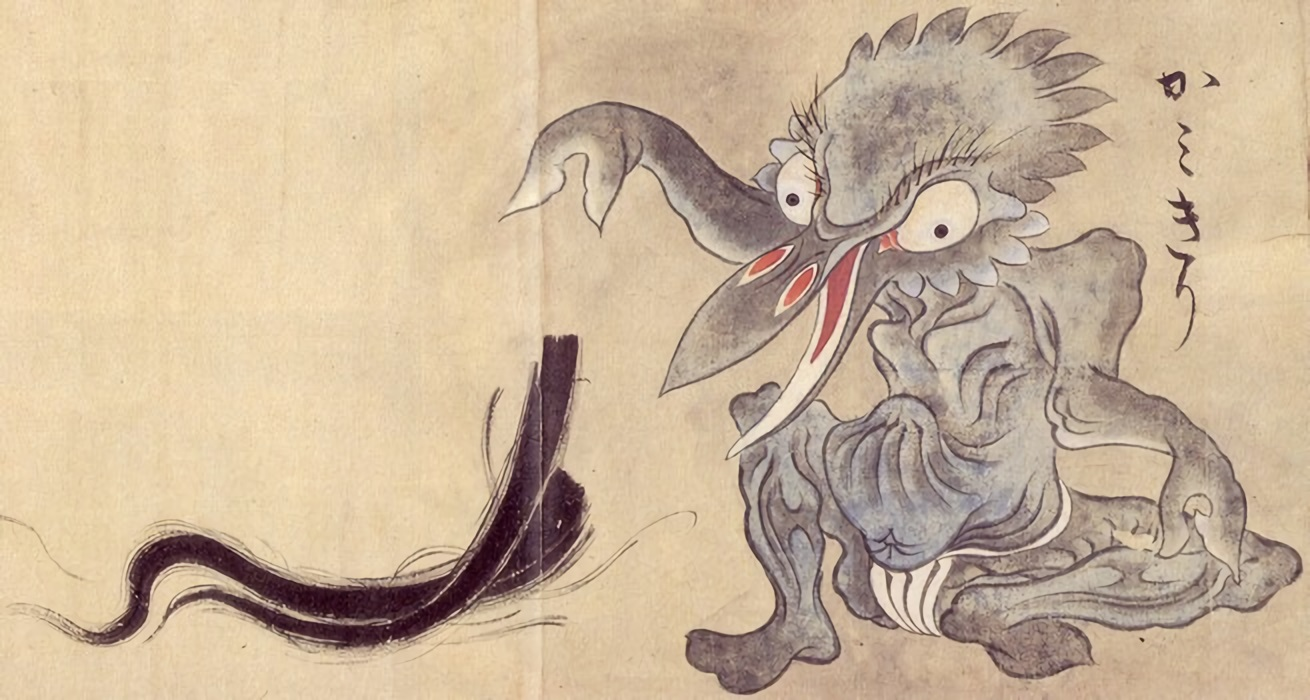
"Kamikiri" from the Hyakkai Zukan by Sawaki Suushi

Kamikiri (髪切り, hair-cutter) or Kurokamikiri (黒髪切, black hair-cutter) is a Japanese yōkai said to secretly cut the hair of people's head. The origins of the kamikiri can be traced to urban rumors of the Edo period; incidents attributed to them were intermittently recorded from the 17th to 19th centuries.

== Concept ==
It was believed that kamikiri could suddenly appear from nowhere and cut the hair of victims without their noticing.

The Shokoku rijindan, a collection of stories (setsuwa) compiled in the Kanpō era (1741-1743) records strange paranormal incidents from early Genroku era (1688-1704) which allegedly happened at Matsusaka, Ise Province (now Matsusaka, Mie Prefecture), and at Konya, Edo, (now Chiyoda, Tokyo, Tokyo): people's hair, both male and female, would suddenly be cut off from their motoyui (元結, a hair-tying string) as they were walking along on roads at night. Those people would not notice this at all, and the cut-off hair would fall down on the road still tied up. Ōta Nanpo's essay Hannichi kanwa (半日閑話) also records similar happenings alleged to have taken place at Shitaya (now Taitō, Tokyo) and in Kohinata (now Bunkyō, Tokyo), where females servants employed at shops and residences were the victims. (Note: Takada excludes these (Shokoku rijindan and Hannichi kanwa) from instances of "perverts" acting on their hair-cutting fetishes because no description of the perpetrator was given despite these not occurring at night-time. For the same reason, these are not accounts of yōkai creatures witnessed, but they are instances of kai (strange happenings) compiled under 's entry for "kamikiri no kai" in Kōbunko vol. 5.)

In Meiji 7 (1874), in Hongō, Tokyo, on the 3rd street at the Suzuki residence, a female servant named Gin was a victim of this kamikiri phenomenon, and this was also reported in the newspaper (Tokyo Nichi Nichi Shimbun) at that time. On March 10, some time after 9PM, when Gin was going to the residence's lavatory, she felt a chilly presence and then suddenly had her tied up hair cut, making it very messy. Startled, Gin rushed to a nearby home and fainted. The people of the house looked after Gin and listened to what happened, and when they looked around the lavatory, they found the severed hair on the floor. Eventually, Gin fell into an illness returned to live with her parents. Rumors that a kamikiri was responsible apparently caused the other residents to abandon the lavatory.

In the writings of Mizuki Shigeru, it is explained that it would appear when a human tries to marry an animal or ghost, and it would cut off that person's hair.

== Variations ==
Descriptions of hair-cutting yokai vary as to physical appearance, method of hair cutting, and motive. Some early authors attributed hair-cutting incidents to kitsune (fox spirit), which were believed to collect human hair for magical purposes. Other accounts describe an insect-like yokai known as the "kamikiri-mushi" ("hair-cutter bug"). In still other accounts, the culprit is identified as the kurokamikiri ("black hair-cutter"), usually depicted as an amorphous creature covered in pitch-black fur which uses its sharp teeth to chew off the hair of the victim.

=== Kitsune (fox-like) ===
Madenokōji Tokifusa's diary Kennaishi during the Muromachi period attributed rumors of unexplained hair cutting to the kitsune, a type of supernatural fox. He quotes the Chinese reference book Taiping Guangji which includes a similar story about a fox which cuts human scalp hair.

In the Edo Period writing Mimibukuro, volume 4 Onna no Kami wo Kuu Kitsune no Koto (About How a Fox Ate a Woman's Hair), there is a story about how a fox was captured at the place where someone fell victim to a kamikiri phenomenon, and when the fox's belly was cut open, a large amount of hair was found packed inside. In Asakawa Zen'an's Zen'an zuihitsu (善庵随筆; pub. Kaei3/1850), there is written the explanation that a Taoist priest was manipulating a mystical fox to cut hair.

=== Kamikiri-mushi (insect-like) ===
The folk encyclopedia Kiyū Shōran (Kan'ei 14/1637) explains mysterious hair-cutting incidents as the work of an insect-like creature called the kamikiri-mushi, or hair-cutting insect. (Note: In Japanese, the word kamikirimushi is used for the longhorn beetle. This source uses the term to refer specifically to an imaginary, supernatural being.) It was believed to lurk under roofs and is described as having razor teeth and sharp claws that functioned as scissors. Paintings depicting this kamikiri-mushi were sold as amulets to ward off evil spirits, and it became fashionable to wear paper charms bearing a poem that read: "If it be a fierce god the parishioner [worships], may his hair be an uncuttable jadeite wig". (Note: 千早振神の氏子の髪なれば切とも切れじ玉のかづらを, "chihayaburu; kami no ujiko no; kami nareba; kiritomo kireji; tama no kazura wo".)

=== Kurokamikiri (black kamikiri) ===
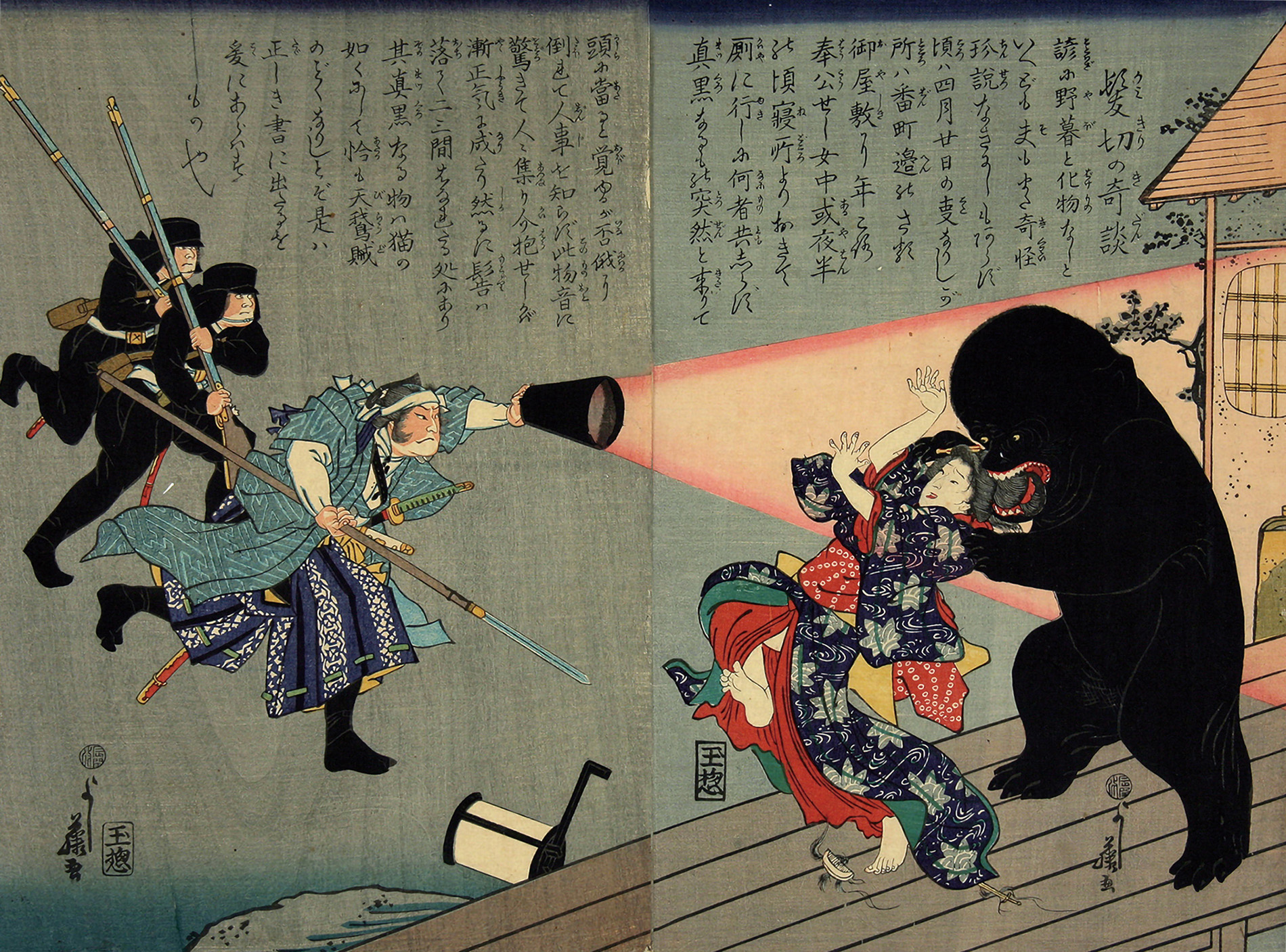
Kamikiri no kidan (1868) by Utagawa Yoshifuji

In Utagawa Yoshifuji's painting Kamikiri no kidan (髪切りの奇談; "Queer tale of hair-cutting", 1868, cf. fig. right), the accompanying text explains that at a certain mansion in Banchō, Edo, a maidservant was going to the outhouse at night when "something completely black" (Note: 「真黒（まっくろ）なるもの」.) drew near and seemed to strike her hair. When she recovered from her fainting spell, her bundle of hair (motodori (Note: 髻 (see ja wiktionary definition): "place where the hair is gathered and bundled above the head".)) had been cut and lay 2, 3-gen's distance or 3.6–5.4 metres (12–18 ft) away. The all-black being was cat-like and velvety. (Note: Full quote: "諺に野暮と化物なしといへども夫（そ）もまた奇怪珍説なきにしもあらず頃は四月廿日の事なりしが所は番町辺（へん）のさる御屋敷に年ころ奉公せし女中或（ある）夜半の頃 寝所（ねところ）よりおきて厠（かわや）に行しに何者共しらず真黒（まっくろ）なるもの突然と来りて頭（かしら）に当ると覚ゆるが否（いな）俄（にわか）に倒れて人事を知らず此物音に驚きて人々集まり介抱せしかば漸（やや）正気に成たり然るに髻（もとどり）は落て 二 三間はなれたる処にあり其真黒なる物は猫の如くにして恰（あたか）も天鵞絨（びろうど）のごとくなりしとぞ是は正しき書に出たるを爰（ここ）にあらはすもの也".)

A similar incident had occurred in the lunar 4th month (May) of 1867 or 1868 (Note: Lunar calendric 20th day of the 4th month Keiō 3 or 4, which falls on either 23 May 1867 or 12 May 1868) at the infantry station in Ogawamachi, Edo where a soldier going to the latrines encountered an "all-black thing" making contact with his head, and when he regained consciousness, found his bound clump of hair two to three ken away.

== Human explanations ==
=== Profit-making accusations ===
According to Kaibara Ekken's Chōya zassai (朝野雑載), a fad for hair-cutting started in the Fukuoka area in Enpō 5/1677, and a samurai named Ōoto Rokuzaemon (大音六左衛門) felt his topknot tugged, but didn't realize until his hair had been cut until arriving home. He subsequently had recurrent dreams of yamabushi ascetics cutting his hair.

That kami-kiri or strange hair-cutting became on-going in Edo was already described with examples in the § Concept section. According to Sugita Genpaku's Nochimi gusa, the hair-cutting fad also arose in the year Meiwa 8 (1771) and consequently a yamabushi (practitioner of izuna magic) named Daizenin (大善院) dwelling in the daikon fields of Yushima in Edo performed prayers to ward off the hair-cutting and also sold protective paper charms (fuda) for tidy profit, leading to rumors accusing this yamabushi of using magic to cause the hair loss in the first place. He and other similar practitioners were arrested by the machi-bugyō magistrate, but eventually released as unfounded. (Note: There was also the shinto practitioner Suzuki Enzan (鈴木圓山) from Ōtsuka and a fortune-teller Nakarai Garyūzan[?] (半井臥龍軒) from Fukagawa accused of using kitsune familiar and genjutsu illusory magic, respectively, to cut people's hair in the first place.)

Besides the shugenja ascetics (i.e. yamabushi) in Edo, there were also wig shopkeepers in Osaka who were punished in Osaka on accusation they were trafficking in the hair obtained from "kamikiri". Again, this might have been a case of scapegoating in order to quell the unrest.

=== Fetishism ===
In psychiatry, Zopfabschneider ("hair cutter") is a term for hair fetishists who feel pleasure from cutting off women's hair with a blade, so at least some of the kamikiri legends were conceivably perpetrated by humans. One reason to support this interpretation is that anecdotes tend to name women as victims whose head hairs were targeted. Engyo Mitamura, a researcher on Edo Period culture and customs, stated in his writings that there have been several examples of people getting caught for the crime of cutting off a person's hair.

=== Superstition ===
In April 1931 (Shōwa 6), a 22 year-old youth named Taue (田植) was arrested for cut off a girl's hair, opportuning on the throng of people out for the ennichi at the Konpira shrine at Shiba, Tokyo. He testified "if I cut the hair of a hundred girls and offer them at a shrine, my feeble body will certainly become healthy," thus providing a superstition as the reason for committing kamikiri.

=== Other ===
It is also supposed that rather than being cut by someone or something, that it is simply an illness that results in hair falling off.

== In pictures ==
The kamikiri is illustrated in such picture scrolls (emakimono) as the Bakemono no e and Sawaki Sūshi's Hyakkai zukan ("Illustrated scroll of a hundred mysteries", 1737) from the Edo Period whhich depict the "kamikiri" as a birdlike yōkai with a long beak and scissor- or pincer-like hands. Although there is no explanatory text accompanying the paintings in these picture scrolls, some of the paintings also show locks of hair next to the creatures suggesting they were cut off.

Kamikiri no Kidan (1868), a nishiki-e by Utagawa Yoshifuji, also depicts a "kamikiri," but in contrast to the depictions in the aforementioned emakimono, it is depicted as completely black, based on a story of having actually encountered it (cf. image above).

=== Tobioni ===
These Bakemonozukushi Emaki (化け物尽し絵巻) (from the Edo Period, now in private possession and entrusted to a museum of the Fukuoka Prefecture), considered to be a yōkai emakimono that was made for putting captions on previously existing yōkai pictures seen in picture scrolls, introduces the "kamikiri" under the name of tobioni (鳶鬼; "kite ogre") (Note: For unknown reasons, all the yōkai in this emaki had their names changed.) In the accompanying caption, they are said to be found around the seaside of Izumo Province, and they are considered to eat the meat of small fish, birds, and mice.

== In popular culture ==
A kamikiri (traditional depiction) appears as a hair stylist in the manga Hozuki's Coolheadedness (Hōzuki no reitetsu) vol. 14.

== See also ==
- List of legendary creatures from Japan
