= L. Tom Perry Special Collections Library =

Rare book and manuscript library in Provo, Utah, United States

Coordinates: 40°14′57″N 111°38′57″W

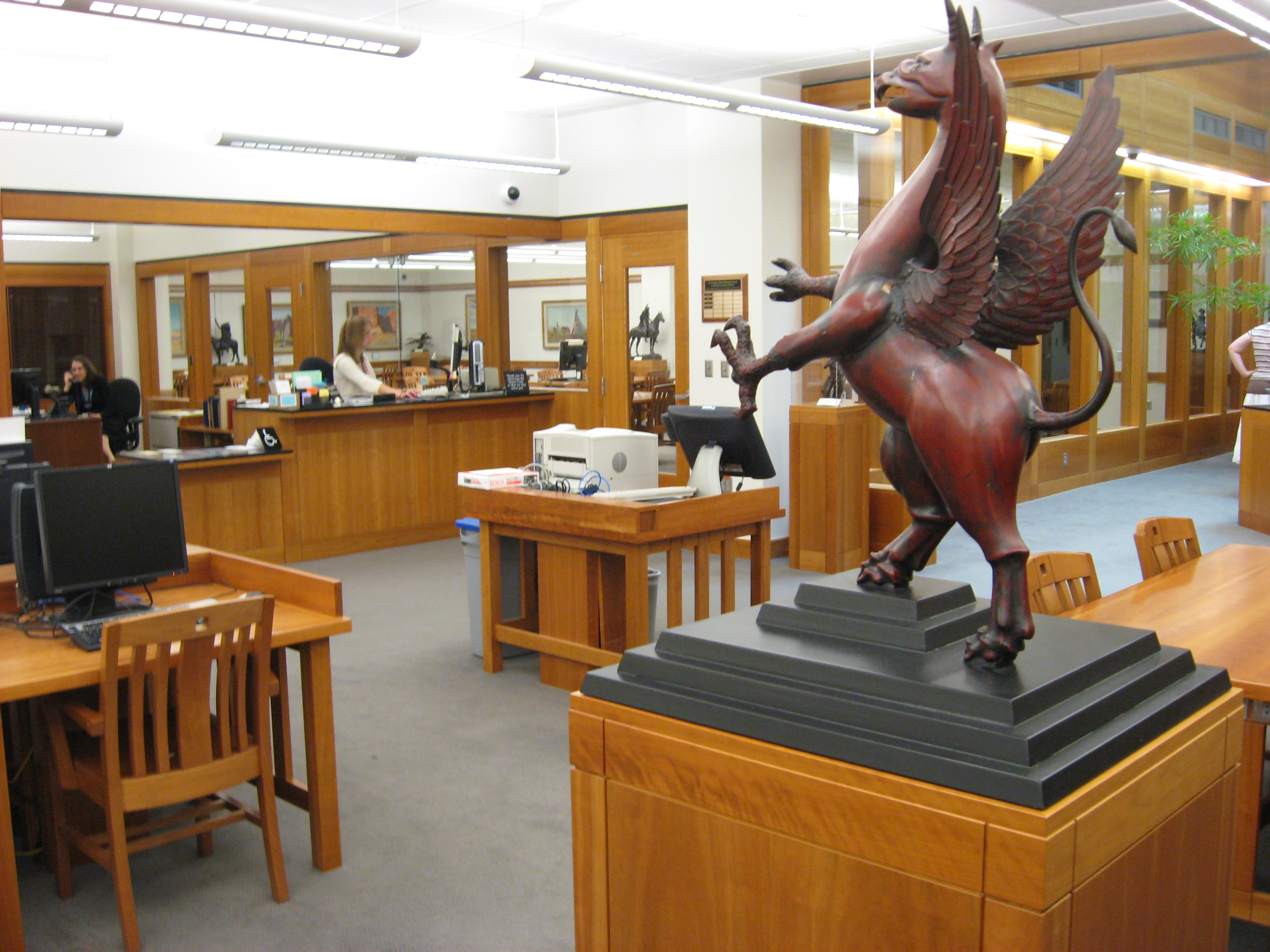
BYU Special Collections

The L. Tom Perry Special Collections is the special collections department of Brigham Young University (BYU)'s Harold B. Lee Library in Provo, Utah. Founded in 1957 with 1,000 books and 50 manuscript collections, as of 2016 the Library's special collections contained over 300,000 books, 11,000 manuscript collections, and over 2.5 million photographs, among many other rare and unique research materials. Since its inception, the special collections have been housed in numerous places including the crawl space of a university building and a wholesale grocery warehouse. Since 2016, the special collections have been located on the first floor of the Harold B. Lee Library and is considered to hold "the finest collection of rare books in the Intermountain West and the second finest Mormon collection in existence".

== Early collections (pre-1955) ==
Recording and preserving history had been an important part of the mission of BYU even before an official archive was established. Documentation of BYU began in 1875 and has grown since then. Early efforts to collect included a Brigham Young Academy expedition to South America in 1900–1901. The purpose of the expedition was to look for evidences to support The Book of Mormon; collectors gathered field notes, photos, botany samples, and correspondences.

Before the official inception of the university's archives and special collections, BYU had already collected rare and expensive books and manuscripts that were housed in various places. One collection was the "Locked Case" collection, housed in a locked bookcase in the head librarian's office. By 1925, what would eventually become the university's special collections stacks were relocated to a small manuscript room in the Grant Library. In the 1930s, BYU professor Wilford Poulson began to collect copies of various Mormon diaries, and staff librarian Newburn I. Butt transcribed and indexed hundreds of others.

S. Lyman Tyler was appointed library director in 1954 and from the beginning of his term he was particularly interested in establishing a university archival program. Tyler was a member of the Society of American Archivists (SAA), and looked to the organization for guidance on how to establish a university archive. As early as the year he was appointed library director, Tyler was having informal conversations with university administrators about the importance of establishing a university archival system.

== Establishing a university archive (1955–1965) ==
=== Archive directive ===
On 26 March 1956, BYU president Ernest L. Wilkinson sent out a university directive that stated, "The director of libraries is also designated historian and archivist for the Unified Church School System." Effectively, this directive authorized the library director as an archivist as well, putting Tyler in an administrative position to create an archival system at BYU. In August 1956, Tyler appointed Ralph Hansen to establish an archive at BYU. He began his efforts in September, housing the first documents in the attic of the Karl G. Maeser Building. This established the first archives at a Utah institution of higher learning.

Tyler and Hansen evaluated university records to determine which ones would have long-term value. These documents were stored in acid-free folders or placed in Fiberdex cases. The two especially worked to preserve records from BYU presidents, gathering documents BYU presidents like Benjamin Cluff, George H. Brimhall, Franklin S. Harris, and Howard S. McDonald. Hansen also reached out to university professors to begin collecting more current records from the faculty and staff. These records included syllabi, meeting minutes, and correspondence papers.

=== Official beginning ===
In January 1957, the Department of Special Collections was officially established as a separate department of the library. Its responsibilities would include managing all unique, rare books and manuscripts along with the archives that had previously been stored. Chad Flake was appointed as the department head. The collection started with 1,000 books, 50 manuscript collections, and 1 curator. The creation of a new collections department inevitably led to administrative changes concerning what items would be included. Some of the archives that had been stored were retained by Special Collections like the Burns collection and the Hafen collection, while others were incorporated into other collections like the Mormon Americana Collection, which contained books related to Mormonism and the Church of Jesus Christ of Latter-day Saints (LDS Church) and sought to acquire all publications about the church and all periodicals published by the church. Books that were included in Special Collections had to be printed in Europe before 1800 or printed in America before 1850; however, materials from a later date were accepted if they were considered rare due to high cost, were limited edition, or had pertinent content. Many BYU materials were left to the archivists as well.

=== Manuscript collecting ===
In 1957, Hansen was put in charge of manuscript collecting, and by 1958, he emphasized the manuscript collecting department in Special Collections. The next year the archives were forced off-campus due to space limitations; Special Collections was housed in the storage area of the Utah Wholesale Grocery Warehouse where it stayed from 1959 to 1960. During that time period, Hansen took a sabbatical to complete his Ph.D. and Donald T. Schmidt was assigned as acting University Archivist.

Hansen returned to BYU in 1961 and began to collect items pertaining to "mining history, economic history, and things that no one else was collecting at the time." He argued that "BYU should search out Western mining records, railroad records, public utility records, transportation records, and cowboy history." Hansen was enthusiastic about the expanding manuscript collection and tried to get the students and faculty more involved in utilizing it. These early efforts to expand Special Collections laid the foundation for the wide variety of collecting areas that BYU is now recognized for. Delbert Roach, the university archivist appointed after Hansen, said, "The Brigham Young University is vitally interested in preserving the history of western America and especially Utah. It was this interest that prompted the Brigham Young University to provide the finest facilities for the preservation of manuscripts, personal records, diaries, letters, business records and similar records in its new library."

During the 1961–1962 school year, Special Collections moved back to BYU campus; it was housed in the library of BYU's J. Reuben Clark Law School. Hansen played an integral role in transporting both archival materials and other papers to their new homes. By this time the collection contained the Arthur V. Watkins papers, James E. Talmage papers, Peerless Coal Co. records, Bamberger Railway Records, Herald R. Clark papers, L. John Nuttall papers, and Jesse Knight Investment Company records. Hansen left BYU in 1962 and was replaced by Roach. Roach remained enthusiastic about manuscript collecting, but left the university after about a year; Hollis Scott was then appointed the university archivist.

== Expanding Special Collections (1965 to present) ==
By 1965, Special Collections contained a hand-written Bible from the 13th century and a first-edition copy of The Federalist by James Madison, John Jay, and Alexander Hamilton. Many of the early materials acquired in the collections were donated directly to BYU or purchased with monetary donations. Special Collections continued to grow, and in 1969 the Newel K. Whitney Collection was acquired, followed by the M. Wilford Poulsen library in 1970. In 1974, Special Collections held an exhibit of Mormon literature that was considered "one of the finest collections of 1830 to 1875 Mormon literature in existence." An exhibit of the collection included a first edition Book of Mormon, a copy of the first LDS hymnal, and a first-edition Pearl of Great Price. Small and large collections continue to be donated to Special Collections each year.

In May 2000, the Department of Special Collections was renamed to the L. Tom Perry Special Collections after L. Tom Perry, an LDS Church apostle. Department chairs include Scott Duvall (1999–2002), P. Bradford Westwood (2002–2009), Russ Taylor (2009–2014), J. Gordon Daines III (2014–2020), Tom Wells (2020-2021), and Dainan Skeem (2021–present).

== Collections ==
=== 19th, 20th, and 21st century Western and Mormon manuscripts ===
BYU has several collections that cover the history of Mormonism from its inception in 1830. The 19th Century Collections contain documents and artifacts related to mining, Indian history, religion, and westward migration. The 20th Century Collection contains documents from Reed Smoot, David M. Kennedy, and many mission diaries that reflect the growth of The Church of Jesus Christ of Latter-day Saints. The 21st Century Collection, likewise, seeks to collect and preserve history from this century related to social, religious, political, racial, and business history of Utah and the church.

=== Arts and Communications Archive ===
The Arts and Communications Archive has records and materials from Cecil B. DeMille, Howard Hawks, and Merian C. Cooper. This archive collects material related to the performing arts, in particular motion pictures, art, journalism, and television broadcasting. This archive contains television episodes from director Henry S. Kesler, and papers of actor James Stewart, Harry Carey, and Robert Cummings.

=== BYU Film Music Archives and Motion Picture Archive ===
The BYU Film Music Archives was officially established in 1996, although the library had begun collecting materials that are now found in the archive over 20 years before. The archive now contains the complete collection from Republic Pictures as well as compositions of Max Steiner, including scores for King Kong and Gone with the Wind which were acquired in 1981. Over 200 rare motion pictures have been collected and are currently in the Motion Picture Archive. These films are available to students, faculty, and the community and are shown in an auditorium in the library for free.

=== Literary Manuscripts and Mormon Authors ===
The Literary Manuscripts collection contains a wide variety of manuscripts from English and British authors. Items acquired in this collection include correspondences of Charles Dickens, Lewis Carroll, and Lord Byron. There are other partial and completed manuscripts from authors Louisa May Alcott, Leslie Norris, and Sir Arthur Conan Doyle. Literary Manuscripts also contains manuscripts from Mormon authors. The Mormon Authors Collection features poetry, biographies, autobiographies, and other writings from the early days of the church including Mormon women Eliza R. Snow, Emmeline B. Wells, and Mary Wooley. It also contains documents from authors in the 20th century, including Orson Scott Card and Dean Hughes.

=== Music Special Collections ===
This collection has manuscript scores for many instruments including harp and viola. The style of music ranges from opera, ballet, hymnals, and French chansons. The Music Special Collections contains the Primrose International Viola Archive, the International Harp Archives, the RKO Vaudeville Collection, and the George Verdak Collection of Dance Music. The music recordings found here include cylinders, 78 rpm discs, cassette tapes, DVDs, and other audio formats.

=== Photograph Archives ===
The Photograph Archives at L. Tom Perry Special Collections works to digitize information so that it can be made available to the public online. Its photographic archives contain over a million images from the early 1850s to the present. Images in the archives are primarily of Utah and the American West. There are a number of images that represent Mormonism and the history of BYU. Photograph Archives are also involved in preservation efforts. Photos in the archives are kept in a cold storage facility to extend their life. It is kept at 40 °F (4 °C) and the relative humidity level is 30 percent. Upon request from a patron, photos are removed from the "cold room" to a warm up room to acclimatize for 24 hours. One of the most notable photograph collections is the George Anderson Collection, which contains photos of American landscapes.

=== William A. Wilson Folklore Archive and Veteran's History ===
The BYU Folklore collection was started by William A. Wilson, a professor at the university. He was given a small office space to begin a folklore archive. In 1995 this archive hired its first full permanent archivist to oversee the collection. When Wilson retired, this archive became part of the Harold B. Lee Library. Since 1999, BYU's Folklore Collection has been a part of Special Collections. This collection includes field notes from BYU folklore students and focuses on families and the religious lives of Latter-day Saints. It is the largest collection of Mormon folklore and contains legends, songs, jokes, riddles, and personal narratives. It also contains information on the culture of Utah County specifically, including information related to Provo Canyon.

This collection oversees the Saints at War Project which was started in 1999 to collect stories of Latter-day Saint veterans. Materials and oral histories have been collected that range from present day to the Mormon Battalion. The project was started by Robert Freeman and Dennis Wright and is in partnership with the Veterans History Project at the U.S. Library of Congress.

=== 19th and 20th century Western and Mormon Americana ===
BYU's Special Collections contains a premiere collection of Mormon Americana, including almanacs, maps, hymnals, books, etc. These collections were originally compiled from the personal libraries of Heber J. Grant, J. Reuben Clark, Newel K. Whitney, James E. Talmage. The Western and Mormon Americana collections were later expanded to include parts of the personal libraries of LeRoy Hafen, Wilford Paulson, and Dale Morgan. This collection contains rare publications like the 1830 Book of Mormon, the Morning Star, Book of Commandments 1833, and 1st Mormon hymnal 1835.

The Americana collections focus on printed material that documents the west. They house many resources about Utah history, but also has material related to other states. The Americana collection contains items relating to the exploration of the Colorado River. A subset of Western Americana is the A. Dean and Jean M. Larsen Yellowstone Collection which has over 2,000 Yellowstone items including books, maps, and photographs of Yellowstone. It was donated to Special Collections in 2000 and is one of the finest private collections of Yellowstone material and has been expanded since its acquisition.

=== University Archives ===
The University Archive contains over 7,000 feet (2,100 m) of linear records that document BYU's history. The archive has documents and photographs from each year of the school's history including items related to dance planning, and athletics and also includes copies of the school's newspaper The Daily Universe and the yearbook The Banyan. University Archives acquires syllabus and course notes from various classes and students.
