= Enenra =

Yōkai

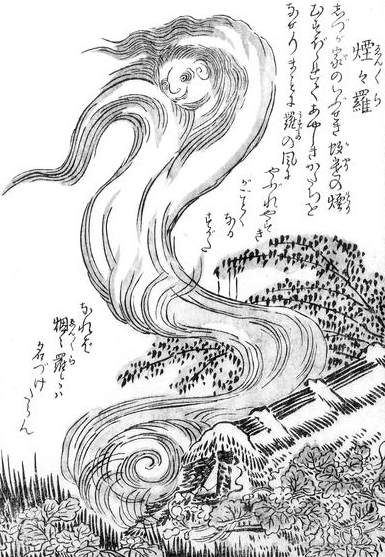
An enenra as depicted in Toriyama Sekien's Konjaku Hyakki Shūi

Enenra (煙々羅, en'enra; lit. "lightweight-fabric smoke"), sometimes enraenra (煙羅煙羅), is a yōkai, or Japanese monster, composed of smoke and darkness. It was first featured in the Konjaku Hyakki Shūi, circa 1781.

== Mythology ==
Enenras mostly reside in bonfires; when they emerge, they take human shape or form. It is said that an enenra can only be seen by the pure of heart.

Enenras are mostly considered to be demons or divine beings of darkness and smoke; legend says that there are two types of enenras, the first and most common type being enenras who are born purely as enenras, whilst the second and more rarely occurring type are humans who have died and been transformed into enenras.
