= Oshiroibabā =

Yōkai from Nara Prefecture

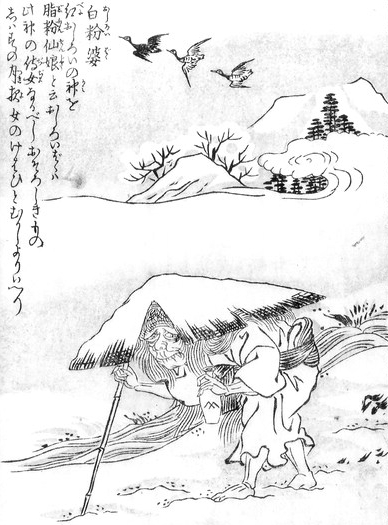
Oshiroibabā from the Konjaku Hyakki Shūi by Toriyama Sekien

Oshiroibabā (Japanese: 白粉ばばあ; lit. "oshiroi (white facial powder) old woman") or Oshiroibabā-san (白粉ばあさん) is a yōkai old woman from the Totsukawa river in Yoshino District, Nara Prefecture.

The oshiroibabā is said to be a yōkai in the form of an old woman who appears while dragging a mirror and making a jingling sound.

Toriyama Sekien's Konjaku Hyakki Shūi depicts an old woman with a very bent back, wearing a large broken umbrella on her head, holding a walking stick with her right hand and a tokkuri (flask for sake) in her left hand, under the name of oshiroibabā. The commentary on the picture says, “the goddess of red and white oshiroi (facial powder) powder is called Shifunsenjo, and oshiroibabā must be an attendant of this goddess,” but it is unclear whether this is supposed to be the same oshiroibabā in Nara folklore. She is said to have applied this white powder all over her face, but this application is so thick and messy that just looking at her is said to be terrifying.

Folklorist Morihiko Fujisawa's book "Zusetsu Minzoku Zenshū" (図説民俗学全集) purports that they are the same kind of yokai as yuki-onna, and to appear on snowy nights in the Noto region of Ishikawa Prefecture in search of sake, but the actual existence of such a tradition has not been confirmed in Noto, and it has been noted that Fujisawa may have invented this in consideration of the Konjaku Hyakki Shūi.

It has also been suggested that there may be some relation between the oshiroibabā, and the mountain yōkai, the yama-uba and yama-hime, given that both of these have stories about begging travelers for white facial powder (oshiroi) and to have appeared at the foot of mountains to buy sake.

== Oshiroibabā of Hase-dera ==
Although with unclear relation with the oshiroibabā talked about previously, there is also another "oshiroibabaa" in legends about an old woman who appeared at Hase-dera in Nara Prefecture during the Muromachi period, as follows.

It was the 6th year of Tenbun (1538). At the suggestion of Kōshin Shōnin, the chief priest of Hase-dera, a group of painter monks from all over Japan gathered to paint the temple's principal subject Kannon Bosatsu on a sheet of paper the size of the main hall of the temple, as a way to improve their war-torn world.

One day, however, an army of the Ashikaga shogun clan stormed the temple and uprooted the grain from the temple and the town. When the painter monks heard the rumor, they were worried that they might not be able to get any food, and upon explaining this to the young monk of the temple, they were reassured that food would be prepared by Kannon's salvation.

While the painter monks thought this was mysterious, the young monk guided them to the side of a well, where they found a girl grinding rice. After the tub of ground rice was drained on the zaru (flat basket), there remained just one grain of rice in the tub, which swelled once it was soaked in water and increased in amount upon further polishing.

One of the painter monks, wanting to see her face if she was an incarnation of Kannon, threw a pebble at her ignoring the caution of the companions. Then there shown a light reminiscent of the pure land, and the girl looked up. Her face was covered with white powder, but she looked like an old woman with wrinkles from the hard work she had put in for the monks. However, all the painter monks bowed down due to the dazzling sight and their sense of gratefulness, so none of the painter monks noticed her true face.

After that, it is said that the monks devoted themselves to their work and completed a magnificent large image. Even today, Hase-dera has a hall for the oshiroibabā where the old woman is enshrined. Until around the Meiji era, the temple had an annual ceremony to apply white powder to this statue for their shushōe (new year's service).
