= Kidōmaru =

Japanese oni

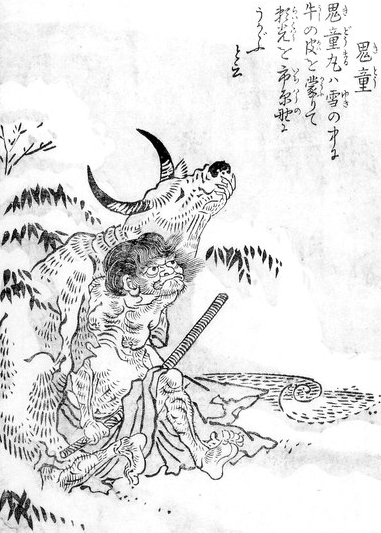
"Kidō" from the Konjaku Hyakki Shūi by Toriyama Sekien

Kidōmaru (鬼童丸, 鬼同丸) is an oni that appears in the Kamakura period collection of setsuwa, the Kokon Chomonjū, among other sources.

== Concept ==
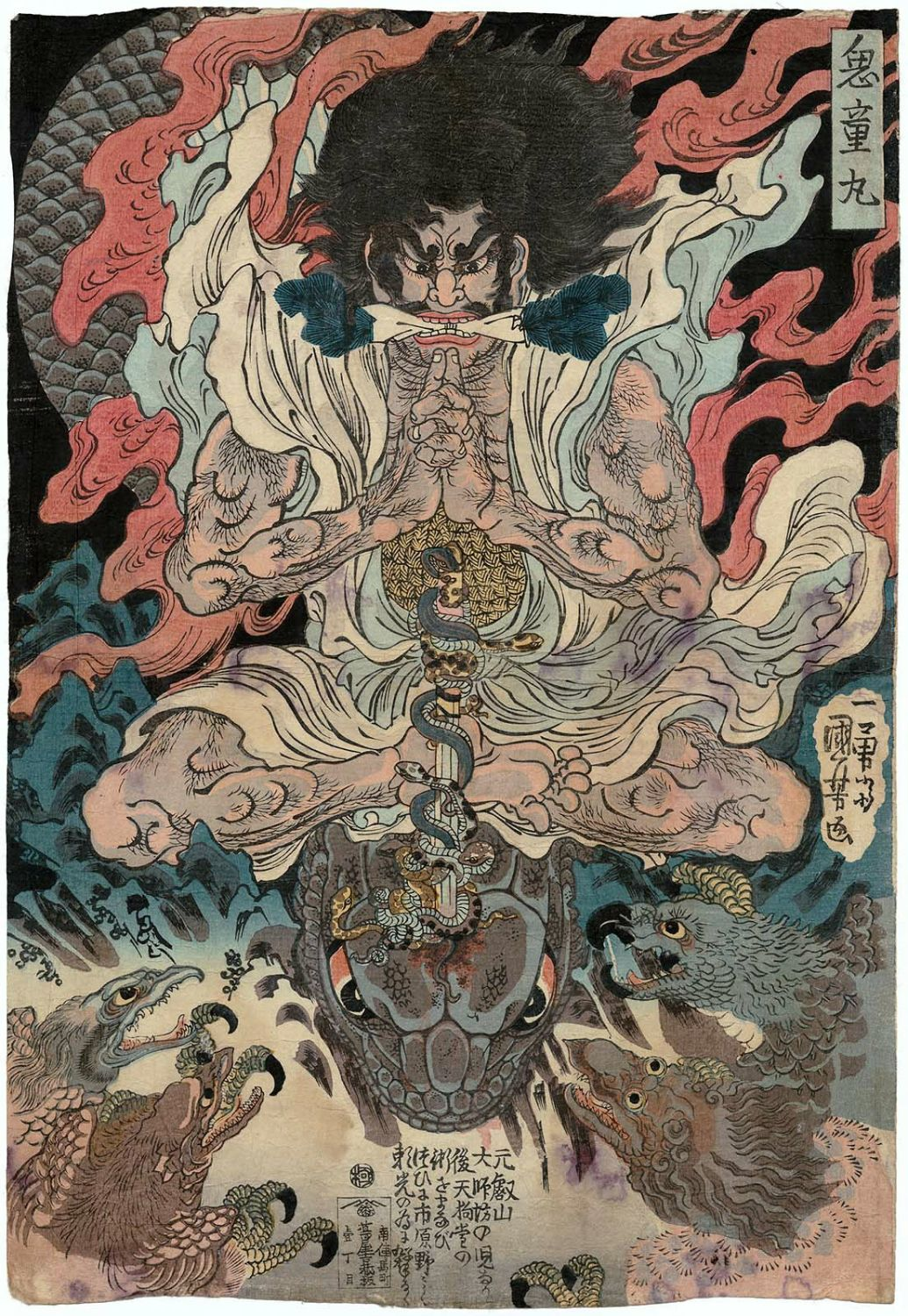
Kidōmaru by Utagawa Kuniyoshi

As described in the Kokon Chomonjū, Minamoto no Yorimitsu is known for the slaying of Shuten-dōji. When he went to the home of his brother Minamoto no Yorinobu, Kidōmaru was caught at the toilet. Yorimitsu said that Yorinobu was careless, so they should restrain the oni with chains, and stayed at Yorinobu's house for that night. Kidōmaru easily tore off those chains, and with a grudge against Yorimitsu, looked at his bed and kept watch. Yorimitsu noticed this and told a servant, "tomorrow, I will make a visit to the Kurama temple." Kidōmaru then went ahead to Kurama, killed one free-ranging cattle at the Ichihara field, hid inside its body, and waited for Yorimitsu to come. However, Yorimitsu saw through this, and Watanabe no Tsuna upon receiving command from Yorimitsu shot through the cattle with a bow and arrow. It is said that Kidōmaru appeared from inside the cow and tried to slash at Yorimitsu, but Yorimitsu struck down Kidōmaru with a single strike. In the yōkai pictures collection, the Konjaku Hyakki Shūi by Toriyama Sekien, under the title of "Kidō," it depicts Kidōmaru in the snow wearing the skin of a cattle waiting for Yorimitsu to come.

Although Kidōmaru is widely known from the Kokon Chomonjū, there is also material from picture books about warriors as well as legends. According to the oral traditions of Kumohara in Fukuchiyama, Kyoto Prefecture, there is the following legend about Kidōmaru as a child of Shuten-dōji. After Minamoto no Yorimitsu slew Shuten-dōji, the girls captured by Shuten-dōji were returned to their old homelands, but one of those girls became mentally disordered and was unable to return home and gave birth to Shuten-dōji's child at Kumohara. This child had teeth at birth, and at the age of 7 or 8, would throw rocks to kill deer or boars for eating. It is said that eventually, this child grew to become Kidōmaru, and aimed at his father's enemy, Yorimitsu and his group.

The Zentaiheiki, a collection of war tales, theorizes this oni to instead be an abandoned child of Shuten-dōji, and originally Kidōmaru was a young child at Mount Hiei but came to ruin as a result of wicked deeds, and was therefore chased away from Mount Hiei, and then migrated to a cave in the mountains and became a bandit.

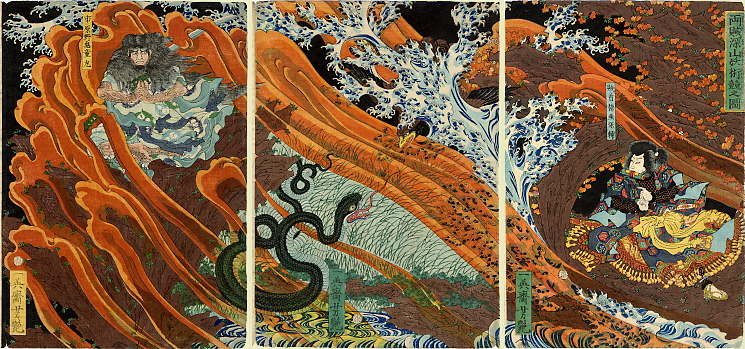
"Ryōzoku Miyama Yōjutsukyō no Zu" (両賊深山妖術競之図) by Utagawa Yoshitsuya

According to the "Shitennō Shōtō Iroku" (四天王剿盗異録) by Takizawa Bakin, at a cave in the mountains, Kidōmaru met Hakamadare, a bandit of the Konjaku Monogatarishū, where there was a scene of a contest comparing skills. Works which depict this include ukiyo-e such as Utagawa Kuniyoshi's Kidōmaru and Tsukioka Yoshitoshi's Hakamadare Yasusuke Kidōmaru Jutsukurabe no Zu (袴垂保輔鬼童丸術競図).
