= Keukegen =

Japanese mythological creature

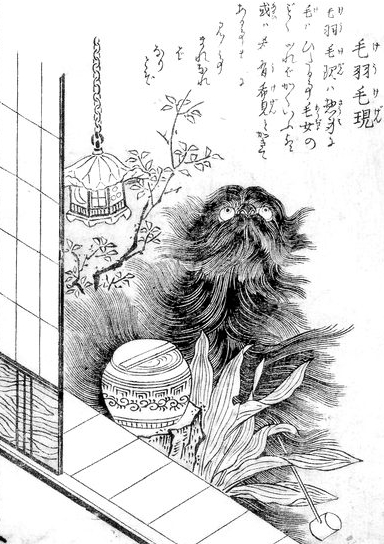
The keukegen as illustrated by Toriyama Sekien.

Keukegen (毛羽毛現, "fluffy hair appearance") is a creature illustrated in Toriyama Sekien's Konjaku Hyakki Shūi.

== Mythology ==
It resembles a small dog covered entirely in long hair. Its name is a pun - when written with different kanji (希有怪訝), keukegen means "an unusual thing which is rarely seen".

According to one report, the keukegen is a disease spirit which lives in damp, dark places and causes people in the house to get sick.
