= Tengutsubute =

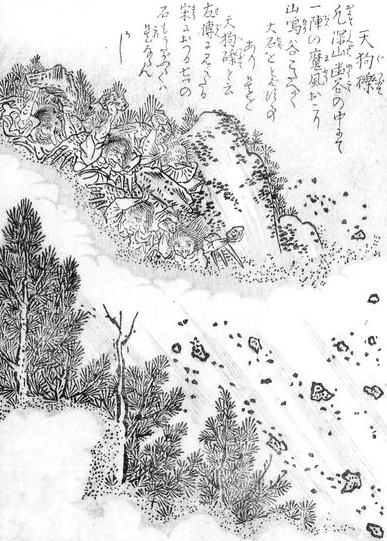
"Tengutsubute" from the Konjaku Hyakki Shūi by Toriyama Sekien

The tengutsubute (Japanese: 天狗礫, lit. tengu sling-stone) is a phenomenon in which stones suddenly fall from the sky.

They appear to be thrown from somewhere, but it's unknown where they flung from, so they are said to perhaps be stones slung by a tengu. It is said to be a way for tengu to try to make people repent for their ill deeds, or alternatively the work of kitsune (foxes) or tanuki (racoon dogs).

There is a legend that those who are hit by this stone will become ill, and that encountering this supernatural phenomenon will have bad hunts.

== Cases ==
In the "Seijo Kaidanroku" (聖城怪談録), a collection of odd stories (kaidan) from Kaga, Ishikawa Prefecture, there is the supernatural story about the head priest of the Daishōji shrine in the town of Daishōji (now Kaga) experiencing a tengutsubute. A stone came from the sky, but there was no stone anywhere afoot where there should have been one, and it made a wave in the river as if a stone fell, but the stone itself could not be seen, and this was seen as rather mysterious.

According to the local historian Morita Heiji's "Kanazawa Kosekishi" (金沢古蹟志), there was another occurrence of tengutsubute in the downtown area of Kanazawa below the hyakumangoku (a unit for taxation purposes) castle in Ishikawa Prefecture. In March, Hōreki 5 or 1755, in the town of Owari and Ima, there would be a tremendous amount of stones being flung all day and night, and it is said to not stop because of a tengu's doing, and it even continued some time after that.

In Kaei 7 or 1854 in Kōjimachi, Edo, an egg merchant's house was said to have had tengutsubute activity in their house. There'd were 20-30 of these stones on the low end and 50-60 of them on the high end, and when one tried to climb to the roof to figure out who threw the stones, there'd be stone coming in from behind, and when one turns around, there'd yet again be stones coming from the other way. Even more odd was how there was the definite sensation of being hit with a stone, but it left no injuries or marks on the body. This house having such a mystery soon became an attraction for people to see, and as the town dōshin (low-ranking Edo period police) came around to strength the security, the number of stones dwindled, and soon enough the phenomenon completely disappeared.

An article in the nishiki-e (brocade-illustrated) newspaper, the Tokyo Eiri Shinbun (Tokyo Illustrated Newspaper) dated March 14, Meiji 9 (1976) describes an instance of tengutsubute occurring not outdoors but inside a house. On the 10th of the same month, in the house of a man named Nakamura Shigejirō stones suddenly started falling around noon and continued to fall for about an hour. Shigejirō was surprised, but not wanting to worry his bedridden ailing father and not wanting the world to know about it, he dared not talk about it and instead raised the falling stones on the altar, offered sake and food, and prayed with his wife for the supernatural occurrence to subside. Then the stone on the altar disappeared before they knew it, and the stones began to fall even more violently. Shigejirō then wielded his sword to intimidate any invisible enemy, but to no avail, as starting that day stones began to fall every day at the same time. Eventually Shigejirō went to the police having no other options left, and when the officer visited, the supernatural stone-falling happened right before the officer's eyes too. Word soon spread, and sightseers flocked to the house. A rickshawman named Kobayashi Nagae appeared and offered to perform a prayer to drive away the any foxes (kitsune) or raccoon dogs (tanuki), and if it did not work, to then refer Shigejirō to a specialist, which Shigejirō gladly accepted. The effect of this prayer was not mentioned in Tokyo Eiri Shinbun.

In“Tōno Monogatari, there is a story about a two-tailed large fox that rained stones down night after night (the fox was captured).

The Sandai Jitsuroku describes a story at around the end of the 9th century where a stone arrowhead that fell on Akita Castle (at that time, it was not believed to have been made by human hands, but was thought to have been dropped along with lightning by a lightning god).

The website X51.ORG, which details mysterious phenomena, mentions the story of a woman who was rained with stones in South Africa.

- The idea of flying stones being an inhuman phenomenon is found in the Shirakawa Emperor period (11th century), when Buddhist monk warriors soldiers repeatedly appealed to the gods for help, and stones would come flying as a show of divine intent (as noted in (日本社会の歴史 （中）, "Nihon Shaki no Rekishi (Chū)") by Yoshiki Amino, Iwanami Publishing, 1998 p. 57)
- The 12th century Hobutsushu, notes that there were bandits called kanatsubute who would rob people using stones, and there's records where they were caught and executed.

== Taimatsumaru ==
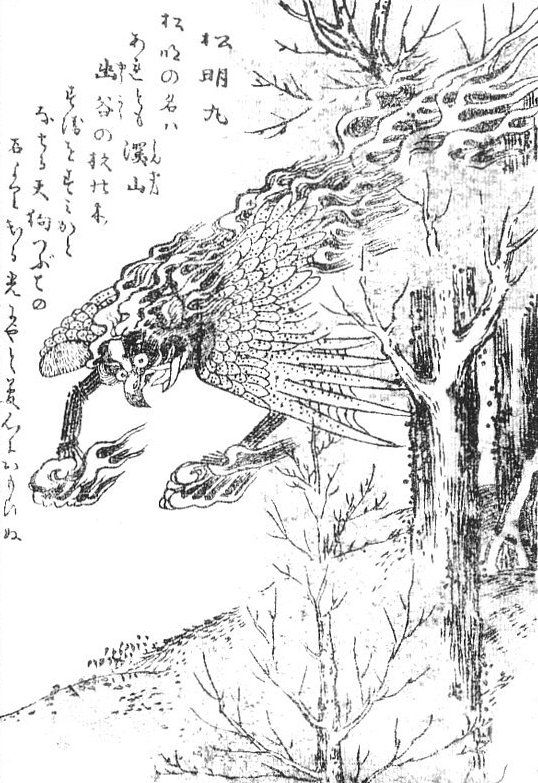
"Taitsumaru" from the Gazu Hyakki Tsurezure Bukuro by Toriyama Sekien

The taimatsumaru (松明丸) is a yōkai in the Gazu Hyakki Tsurezure Bukuro by Toriyama Sekien. It is depicted as a bird of prey carrying fire. The commentary in Gazu Hyakki Tsurezure Bukuro says that they appear in deep mountain forests by the light emitted by tengutsubute. It is not a fire that illuminates the darkness, but is said to be a yōkai that hinders Buddhist training.
