= Aoandon =

Japanese mythological creature

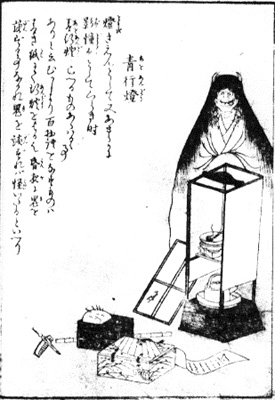
Toriyama Sekien's Aoandō.

Aoandon, or Aoandō (青(あお)行(あん)灯(どん) or 青行燈, "blue andon") is a creature illustrated by Toriyama Sekien in his Konjaku Hyakki Shūi. It was meant to represent the spirit that appeared during the game Hyakumonogatari Kaidankai, after the last story was told. The candles in the room during these meetings were often placed in blue-paper andon lamps in order to create an eerie atmosphere, hence this creature's name.

It appears as a woman with a blue complexion and twin horns from its brow, and sharp teeth.

== Popular culture ==
- In the mobile game Onmyōji, Aoandon is a shikigami who loves storytelling.
- The bioluminescent marine worm Polycirrus aoandon is named after the creature.
- An Aoandon appears in the 2025 video game Assassin's Creed Shadows as a mini-boss in the side mission "The Yokai".
