= Byōbunozoki =

Japanese monster painted by Toriyama Sekien

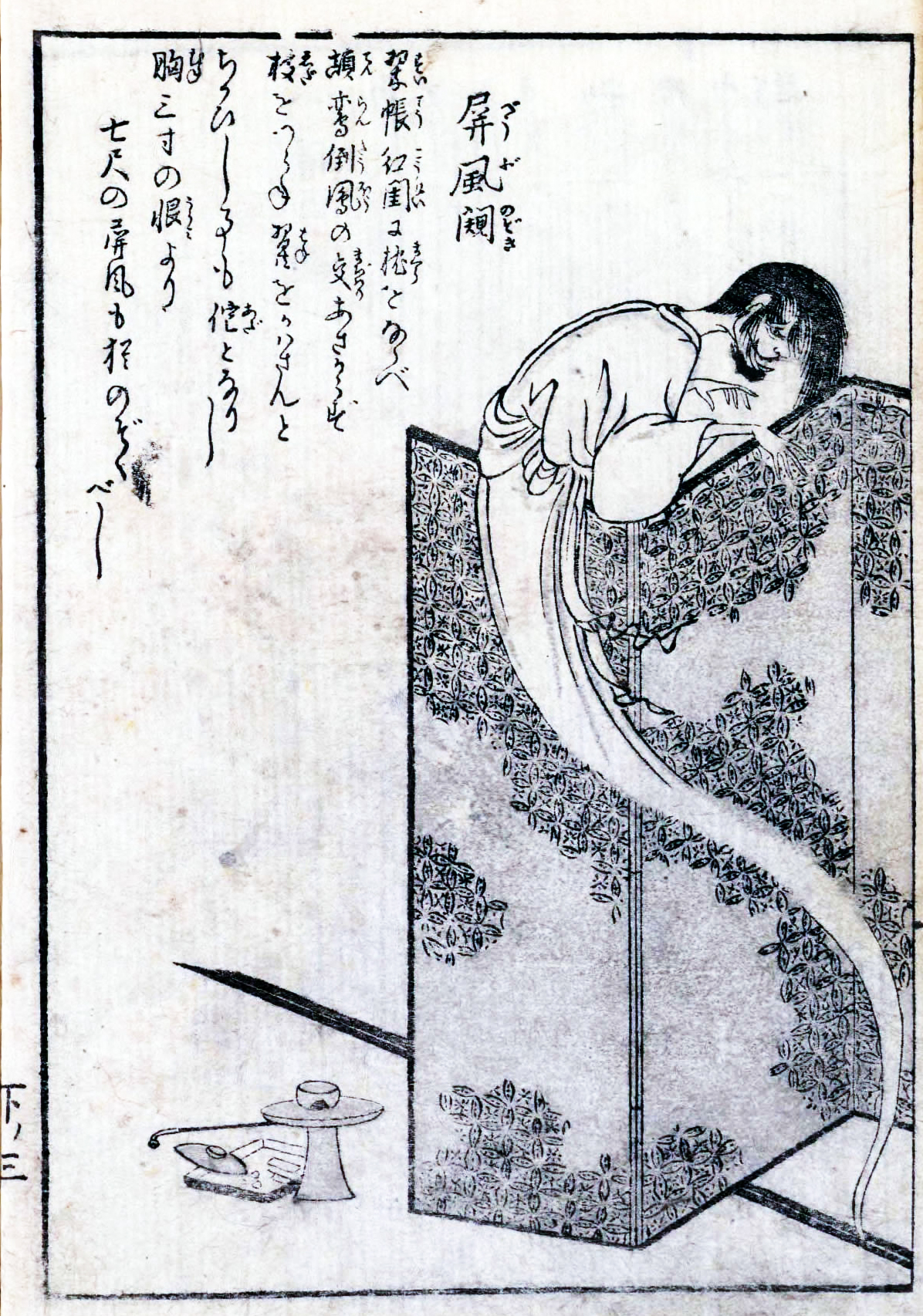
"Byōbunozoki" from Toriyama Sekien "Konjaku Hyakki Shūi"

Byōbunozoki (屛(びょうぶ)風(の)闚(ぞき), folding screen peeper) is a Japanese monster in the collection of monster paintings by Toriyama Sekien, "Konjaku Hyakki Shūi".

== Overview ==
According to the commentary in The One Hundred Demons, the Byōbunozoki is a monster who looks at a person from the outside of a folding screen, and looks beyond the 7-inch folding screen. According to Chinese classics, the Qin Shio emperor jumped over the screen of Xianyang Palace when he was about to be murdered.

== View more ==
- List of legendary creatures from Japan
