= Onihitokuchi =

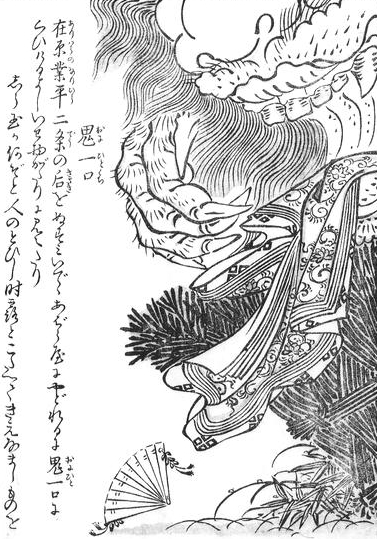
"Onihitokuchi" from the Konjaku Hyakki Shūi by Sekien Toriyama

Onihitokuchi (鬼一口) refers to a Japanese setsuwa (legend) in which oni (ogres) eat humans in one mouthful. This in turn refers to something extremely dangerous and difficult, as well as the quick and easy handling of things.

== Summary ==
As an example of a representative story, in the beginning of the Heian Era, in the uta monogatari "The Tales of Ise," there is the sixth part, "The Steps of Akutagawa (芥川の段)." A certain man visited a woman for several years, but due to their difference in social status, they were not able to get together. One time, the man finally stole that woman, but while he was fleeing, as the night grew late, a thunderstorm came, so he found a cellar that did not fasten its doors and made the woman go in, and with a bow and arrow in his own possession, stood guard in front of the cellar, and waited for dawn. Before long, dawn came and when he peeped into the cellar, there was no figure of any woman. The woman was killed and eaten in one mouthful by an oni that lived in the cellar, and the shriek that she made when she died was erased by the sound of lightning.

This story was depicted in the collection of yōkai depictions, the Konjaku Hyakki Shūi by Sekien Toriyama under the title "onihitokuchi," and in the explanatory text, the man was Ariwara no Narihira, and the woman was Fujiwara no Takaiko, but in actuality their names were not specified in "The Tales of Ise," and the view that it was a tale of Ariwara no Narihira was an explanation in common language.

Other than that, in the collection of setsuwa, the Nihon Ryōiki from the beginning of the Heian era, there was a story where a man and woman made their vows to each other one night, but in reality the man was an oni who ate the woman, and in the collection of setsuwa, the Konjaku Monogatarishū from the end of the Heian era, there was a story where women who walked outside at night would be suddenly taken away by a man, and as the man was actually an oni, the women would be eaten in one mouthful.

There is the theory that the reason why stories of "onihitokuchi" were common is that wars, disasters, and famines where people lose their lives or go missing were interpreted as oni from another world appearing in the present world who take away humans.
