= List of Kakuriyo: Bed & Breakfast for Spirits episodes =

Kakuriyo: Bed & Breakfast for Spirits is an anime television series based on the light novel series of the same name, written by Midori Yūma and illustrated by Laruha. Announced in November 2017, the anime is directed by Yoshiko Okuda at Gonzo, with scripts handled by Tomoko Konparu, characters designs done by Yōko Satō and music composed by Takurō Iga. The series aired from April 2 to September 24, 2018, on Tokyo MX and other networks, running for two consecutive cours for a total of 26 episodes across 9 DVD/Blu-ray releases. The first opening theme song is "Tomoshibi no Manimani" (灯火のまにまに), performed by Nao Tōyama, while the first ending theme is "Sai -color-" (彩 -color-), performed by Manami Numakura. The second opening theme song is "Utsushiyo no Yume" (ウツシヨノユメ, A Dream of the Temporal World), performed by Nano, while the second ending theme song is "Shiranai Kimochi" (知らない気持ち, Unknown Feelings), performed by Megumi Nakajima. Both Crunchyroll and Funimation streamed the series.

A second season was announced in May 2024. It is produced by Gonzo and Makaria, with Joe Yoshizaki replacing Okuda as director, with Tomoko Konparu returning to write the scripts; Hidemi Katsura replacing Satō as the character designer, and Takurō Iga returning to compose the music. The season aired from October 2 to December 18, 2025. (Note: Tokyo MX listed the season premiere on October 1 at 24:00, which is effectively October 2 at midnight JST.) The opening theme song is "Tōryanse" (とおりゃんせ), while the ending theme song is "Namida no Recipe" (涙のレシピ; 'The Recipe for Tears'), both performed by Nao Tōyama. Crunchyroll streams the series.

== Series overview ==
Season	Episodes	Originally released	
Season	Episodes	First released	Last released
1	26	April 12, 2018	September 24, 2018
2	12	October 2, 2025	December 18, 2025

== Episodes ==
=== Season 1 (2018) ===
No. overall	No. in season	Title (Note: All English titles are taken from Crunchyroll.)	Directed by	Written by	Storyboarded by	Original release date
1	1	"I'm Marrying into an Inn for Spirits."; Transliteration: "Ayakashi o Yado ni Yomeiri shimasu ." (Japanese: あやかしお宿に嫁入りします。)	Kazuya Aiura	Tomoko Konparu	Yoshiko Okuda	April 2, 2018
Aoi Tsubaki has been able to see Ayakashi since she was a child. Abandoned by her mother, Aoi was raised by her grandfather who eventually died. She encounters a hungry Ayakashi whom she gives her lunch to. The Ayakashi, an Ogre named Odanna, kidnaps her to the Ayakashi's Hidden Realm, where he runs an inn named Tenjin-ya. Aoi's grandfather frequently visited Tenjin-ya where he amassed a debt of 100 million yen and offered Aoi's hand in marriage as payment. Aoi refuses to marry Odanna and insists on working to pay off the debt. Odanna agrees, but points out that as an employee rather than his wife, she will receive no protection from dangerous Ayakashi. Aoi is visited by Ginji, a nine-tailed fox servant who brings her food. Aoi remembers that a kind Ayakashi once fed her when she was a child. She attempts to find a job but is rebuffed by the other servants who consider a human a poor choice for Odanna's wife. She encounters Ginji in a run-down restaurant and offers to cook something. After tasting her omurice he asks her to work at the restaurant. Elsewhere other Ayakashi react to the news a human bride has appeared in the Hidden Realm.
2	2	"I've Found a Job at the Inn for Spirits."; Transliteration: "Ayakashi o Yado de Shigoto Mitsukemashita." (Japanese: あやかしお宿で仕事みつけました。)	Hiromichi Matano	Tomoko Konparu	Daisuke Tsukushi	April 9, 2018
Several guests get into a fight, during which Odanna treats Aoi harshly. Aoi finds an elderly drunk Tengu and helps him recover by giving him food she made. The Tengu, named Matsuba, was once saved from drowning by Aoi's grandfather Shiro. Matsuba intended to give Shiro a valuable Tengu fan as thanks, but never got around to it. Odanna reveals that Matsuba is actually the Tengu Elder who went missing after falling from an airship. Matsuba gives Aoi the fan he once intended to give Shiro. When he learns Aoi is collateral for Shiro's debt he offers to pay the debt and let Aoi live on Mt. Shumon with the Tengu, and marry one of Matsuba's sons if she wants. He berates Odanna for treating Aoi harshly. Aoi declines Matsuba's offer as she intends to pay the debt herself. Matsuba promises to return if Aoi opens an eatery, though Odanna seems reluctant to allow her to. Aoi meets Kasuga, a shape shifting tanuki who thanks her for unwittingly fixing a disagreement between the Tengu and the Tenjin-ya servants and asks if she can try the human cooking that made it possible. Odanna gives Aoi permission to open an eatery.
3	3	"I Took a Trip to the Capital of the Hidden Realm."; Transliteration: "Kakuriyo no To ni Odekake Shimashita." (Japanese: かくりよの都にお出かけしました。)	Hiromichi Matano	Tomoko Konparu	Daisuke Tsukushi	April 16, 2018
As a child Aoi was given food by a masked Ayakashi. Odanna gives Aoi a crystal hairpin which will slowly bloom into a Camellia, marking the time limit for her debt. They travel to Youto, the capital city, and meet Suzuran, Akatsuki's sister. Aoi becomes separated from Odanna and a snowball exposes her as human to Ayakashi who try to eat her. As she fights them, the Tengu fan blasts the Ayakashi with a strong gust of wind. The snow was thrown by Oryo who wanted to get rid of Aoi out of jealousy. Aoi helps Suzuran hide after her master sold her to Tannosuke, heir of the Yahata-ya, a wealthy kimono manufacturing family. Odanna arrives and escorts all three girls to the airship where they are confronted by Tannosuke and his servants who shoot at them. Aoi uses the Tengu fan to defend the airship. Odanna reveals Aoi is Shiro's granddaughter and his fiancé, which terrifies Tannosuke and his servants. Oryo is confined to her room at Tenjin-ya until Odanna can decide on her punishment. Aoi begins planning the eatery's menu with Ginji who somehow knew that Aoi likes curry with rice. Kasuga suddenly arrives carrying Oryo who has a fever.
4	4	"I Looked After a Snow Woman and an Earth-Spider."; Transliteration: "Yuki-onna to Tsuchigumo o Kaihō Shimashita." (Japanese: 雪女と土蜘蛛を介抱しました。)	Ken Katō	Miharu Hirami	Hidetoshi Namura	April 23, 2018
Kasuga explains that the servants secretly hate Oryo and now that she has disgraced herself, no one is willing to treat her. Aoi ends up caring for her, making Tofu ice-cream to cool her down. Oryo resents Aoi caring for her but mellows somewhat after tasting the ice-cream. Oryo ends up revealing she loves Odanna because he saved her from her abusive former mistress and gave her a job. To impress him she ruthlessly earned her way to her senior position, angering most of the other servants. Suzuran and her brother, Akatsuki, fight while transformed into giant spiders. Suzuran wins. Odanna explains that 40 years ago Shiro took in Suzuran and Akatsuki when they were homeless and Suzuran is determined to visit the human realm to remember him, against Akatsuki's wishes. Aoi offers to cook Odanna's favourite meal but he refuses to tell her what it is. Aoi discovers the injured and humiliated Akatsuki outside the eatery, shrunken to the size of a baby spider. Oryo, now acting much happier, asks for Oyakodon, as Oryo claims Aoi's food has strong spiritual energy and is perfect for healing spiders. This surprises Aoi who had no idea her food contained spiritual power.
5	5	"I Should Not Forget My Promise to the Ayakashi."; Transliteration: "Ayakashi to no Yakusoku o Wasurete Hanaranu." (Japanese: あやかしとの約束を忘れてはならぬ。)	Kazuya Aiura	Miharu Hirami	Kazuya Aiura	April 30, 2018
Aoi learns from Suzuran that Akatsuki frequently attacked humans to keep her safe until he was defeated by Shiro who took them in and eventually returned them to the Hidden Realm. He visited Suzuran frequently until he took in Aoi. Despite knowing Shiro is dead Suzuran is determined to return to the human realm. Hoping to help the siblings reconcile Aoi convinces Akatsuki to help cook dumplings that Shiro used to make. Aoi realizes Shiro deliberately taught her to cook food that appeals to Ayakashi. Akatsuki tells Aoi she can call him by his name if she wants. Despite not saying goodbye in person, Suzuran feels her brother's love from the dumplings which makes her happy. As Suzuran is leaving, Tannosuke attacks Tenjin-ya demanding to see Suzuran. Odanna forces Aoi to leave with Suzuran while Akatsuki fights Tannosuke's servants. In the human realm they visit Shiro's grave and Suzuran decides to live in the cemetery next to Shiro. Aoi goes shopping and considers whether she wants to stay or go back to the Hidden Realm. She meets her Ayakashi friend, Chibi, and decides to take him with her. When Odanna appears she happily returns to Tenjin-ya.
6	6	"I'm Opening up an Eatery in an Ayakashi Inn."; Transliteration: "Ayakashi o Yado de Shokuji Tokoro Hajimemasu." (Japanese: あやかしお宿で食事処はじめます。)	Itsuki Imazaki	Yoriko Tomita	Itsuki Imazaki	May 7, 2018
Aoi names her eatery Moonflower. The Tenjin-ya chef's attempt to play a prank on Aoi after learning the Tengu elder prefers her cooking to theirs. Aoi is attacked by an assassin and saved by Sasuke, a Kamaitachi and Tenjin-ya security guard. Aoi prepares him a meal and learns that Sasuke was also friends with her grandfather and often went along with Shiro's more unsavoury hobbies of scaring customers and peeking on the women's baths. Odanna invites Aoi on a trip to town. Aoi learns an Ayakashi newspaper has identified her as Odanna's fiancée to the entire Hidden Realm. Aoi becomes interested in the mask worn by the Ayakashi who fed her as a child. She becomes separated from Odanna while following an Ayakashi wearing a similar mask and is almost eaten until Odanna arrives and reveals the Ayakashi is named Rokusuke and is the farmer who produces Aoi's favourite cherry juice. On Moonflower's opening night, the Tengu book the entire eatery for an all-night party but Aoi then receives no further customers for an entire week. As a result she is summoned to a meeting with Byakuya, Tenjin-ya's chief accountant.
7	7	"Taking A Walk with the Master in the Rain."; Transliteration: "Dai Danna-sama to Ame Sanpo." (Japanese: 大旦那様と雨散歩。)	Ken Katō	Yoriko Tomita	Yoshiko Okuda	May 14, 2018
Byakuya orders Aoi to either start making profits or marry Odanna. Oryo asks Aoi to make a bento for a famous author who regularly stays at Tenjin-ya to work. Aoi struggles as the author frequently skips meals. Odanna gives her advice on running Moonflower and shows concern for her health. Aoi comes up with bento's that can be eaten while writing. A week later the author, a Nyūdō-bōzu named Hakkabou thanks her for the bentos. He wears a mask similar to the Ayakashi from her childhood and tells her it is a popular style from the south. Aoi learns Hakkabou bases his heroes on Odanna and his villains on Shiro. When he realizes Aoi is Shiro's granddaughter and Odanna's fiancée, he rushes off to start writing. A young girl visits Moonflower and after trying Aoi's food gives Aoi a colourful ball then vanishes. Ginji suspects the girl was a Zashiki-warashi blessing Aoi with prosperity. Moonflower suddenly becomes extremely popular after Hakkabou praises Aoi in his newspaper column. As a result Aoi is requested to attend the Imperial Court and cook an anniversary meal for Nuinoin, a royal family member, and Ritsuko, his human wife who misses human style food.
8	8	"Shopping with the Nine-Tailed Young Master."; Transliteration: "Kyū-bi no Waka Danna to o Kaimono." (Japanese: 九尾の若旦那とお買い物。)	Daisuke Kurose	Tomoko Konparu	Daisuke Kurose	May 21, 2018
Aoi frets about what to cook the royal couple. She finds Byakuya feeding kitten Ayakashi and cooks him breakfast. He tells her the royal couple went on dates at western restaurants, so Aoi decides to buy beef stew ingredients from the foreign delicacy market. Ginji realizes Byakuya is acting like he used to when Shiro was bullying him. Odanna tries to stop her going shopping without him since he must attend a meeting with the other rulers of the Hidden Realm. Aoi blatantly bribes him with a bento so he gives her a necklace containing ogre's fire to keep her safe. Lightning strikes and Aoi, who suffers from Astraphobia, clings to Odanna who makes her feel safe. Aoi begins to suspect Odanna was her childhood Ayakashi and almost asks him but decides not to. Odanna continues to worry as he goes to his meeting. Aoi arrives at the market with Ginji and his reaction to western curry makes Aoi suspect Ginji was her childhood Ayakashi. Aoi is suddenly lured away by an Ayakashi and she wakes up locked in a tiny room, her Tengu Fan gone. Her captors say they will free her once she has missed the royal couple's anniversary.
9	9	"An Elderly Ayakashi Couple's Wedding Anniversary."; Transliteration: "Ayakashi-rō Fūfu no Kekkon Kinen Hi." (Japanese: 妖老夫婦の結婚記念日。)	Satoshi Toba	Miharu Hirami	Hidetoshi Namura	May 28, 2018
Aoi remembers her childhood Ayakashi was intrigued by the fact that she was not scared of him and took care of her when she was alone. Rain leaks through the roof and Aoi almost drowns. Odanna appears and rescues her. She awakens at Tenjin-ya where it transpires the kidnappers were the still jealous assistants of Tenjin-ya's Chief Chef. The Chef offers to resign but Aoi refuses to let him. As punishment, Odanna orders the Chef and his assistants to work at Tenjin-ya for many years to come. The Chef laughs as he realizes Aoi is exactly like Shiro. With the dinner only 4 hours away, Aoi rushes to cook a pork belly dish instead of western beef stew. She returns to Moonflower where Oryo and Kasuga prepared a meal for her. The royal anniversary is extremely successful but Aoi collapses afterwards. Because of the high level magic used to kidnap Aoi Odanna suspects the assistant chefs were put up to the kidnapping by Orio-ya, another inn Odanna is in competition with who also possibly hired the assassin who tried to kill Aoi. Aoi recalls the Ayakashi who helped kidnap her was a blond Zashiki-warashi similar to the one who gave her the prosperity blessing.
10	10	"A Rival Has Arrived at the Ayakashi Inn."; Transliteration: "Ayakashi o Yado ni Kōtekishu Kimashita." (Japanese: あやかしお宿に好敵手きました。)	Yasuyuki Fuse	Yoriko Tomita	Yasuyuki Fuse	June 4, 2018
Byakuya warns Ginji that people from Orio-ya may have been involved in Aoi's kidnap. Ritsuko, of the royal couple, visits Aoi to thank her for the anniversary meal and gives her a Hagoromo Shawl, traditionally only worn by female members of the Youto Imperial Court. She tells Aoi how she met her husband, Nuinoin, fell in love and got married. She also reveals that eating Hidden Realm food will increase a human's lifespan, but she will still die long before Nuinoin. She also warns Aoi that if she does marry Odanna someday she must never show weakness in front of evil Ayakashi. Odanna visits Aoi and ends up falling asleep on her bed, to her annoyance. The next day Aoi visits Tenjin-ya as a guest so she can accept the chief chef's apology meal, which she enjoys eating with Odanna before he goes on a 6 day business trip to the human world. He gives Aoi a magic tablet to contact him if she gets in trouble. Aoi tries to hide the fact she will miss him while he is gone. As soon as Odanna leaves a crisis arises as Hatori, the front desk manager of Orio-ya, arrives at Tenjin-ya.
11	11	"The Nure-Onna Bath Caretaker and Her Shiranui Teacher."; Transliteration: "Yumori no Nure Onna to Shishō no Shiranui." (Japanese: 湯守の濡れ女と師匠の不知火。)	Hiromichi Matano	Miharu Hirami	Hiromichi Matano	June 11, 2018
Hatori, Orio-ya's Tengu front desk manager, and Tokihiko, a Shiranui Ayakashi who is Orio-ya's bath house manager, are reluctantly allowed by the Tenjin-ya staff to stay as guests. Aoi exchanges messages with Odanna via the tablet. Aoi spots Tokihiko with Shizuna who panics, body slams Tokihiko then flees with Aoi. Shizuna explains Tokihiko was her master who taught her how to run a bath house. It is implied she loved him and tried to help Orio-ya by finding a new hot spring, but accidentally disturbed a dangerous spirit and Tokihiko was left with a scar on his face from which his blue flame power continually leaks out. As a result Shizuna was fired from Orio-ya. Aoi decides to help them reconcile. Tokihiko, who appears to love Shizuna in return, tries to get her to leave with him, but she becomes upset and body slams him again. Ginji suspects Shizuna feels she cannot leave with Tokihiko because she feels ashamed and guilty about scarring his face. With some subtle manipulation from Aoi Shizuna and Tokihiko cook a meal together at Moonflower and finally reconcile with Shizuna promising to return to Orio-ya with Tokihiko in the future. Hatori is secretly impressed with how shrewd Aoi is.
12	12	"There's a Secret in the Basement at Tenjin-ya."; Transliteration: "Tenjin-ya no Chika ni Himitsu Arimasu." (Japanese: 天神屋の地下に秘密あります。)	Yūsuke Onoda	Yoriko Tomita	Hidetoshi Namura	June 18, 2018
Hatori visits Aoi and reveals he is an old friend of Shiro and Matsuba's disowned third son. Akatsuki argues with Hatori who he thinks is too much like Shiro. Aoi decides to serve shaved ice at Moonflower. Three children go missing from the inn. Aoi and Akatsuki realize they are in the basement. Aoi's ogre fire necklace continues to glow and Akatsuki deduces it is drawing power from Aoi's spiritual energy. The basement is a giant workshop run by Tesso that manufacture Tenjin-ya's gift shop items. They find the children who become scared of Akatsuki and disappear again. Aoi becomes lost but Nobunaga, Tokihiko's pet dog, leads her to an old picture of Odanna with the Zashiki-warashi before she is unexplainably teleported to the children, who are searching for a lost hair ornament. They run out of a tunnel that leads over a cliff and one of the children falls. She and Aoi are both saved by Akatsuki's spider silk. Akatsuki returns the girls lost hair ornament he found and the children return to their parents. Aoi receives a tablet message from Odanna promising he will be home soon. Aoi promises to make him another bento when he returns. Aoi serves everybody shaved ice but notices Ginji is not there. Akatsuki becomes popular with the guests children. Ginji appears at Moonflower in his nine tail fox cub form suffering from an illness.
13	13	"A Grand Banquet at an Ayakashi Inn."; Transliteration: "Ayakashi o Yado no Dai Enkai." (Japanese: あやかしお宿の大宴会。)	Ken Katō	Tomoko Konparu	Akira Nishimori	June 25, 2018
Ginji dramatically improves after eating Aoi's food. Ginji admits he does not think the other staff trust him because he used to work at Orio-ya. Aoi assures him she trusts him. Odanna returns so Aoi takes him her bento but overhears him talking to Hatori about Ginji, but before she can hear any more she accidentally falls through the door, making Hatori and Odanna laugh. Odanna reports to Aoi that Suzuran is enjoying living near Shiro's grave and that he bought all the human ingredients she asked for. He also thanks her for taking care of everyone at Tenjin-ya while he was away. While Aoi is baking bread Byakuya asks her for food for his kittens but ends up taking her to Tenjin-ya's hot spring where Odanna is with Hatori and Tokihiko. He reveals Hatori's main reason for visiting Tenjin-ya is to avoid his father, Matsuba, who is staying at Orio-ya. He also warns Tokihiko that Shizuna is precious to Tenjin-ya's staff and they won't let her go with him easily. Odanna asks Aoi to host a party at the hot spring's kitchen so all the staff can cook together. The party is a success while Oryo is revealed to be a terrible drunk. As the party is ending an airship belonging to Orio-ya appears overhead and an Ayakashi on-board is wearing the exact same mask as Aoi's childhood Ayakashi.
14	14	"A Black Ship Arrives from the Southern Land."; Transliteration: "Minami no Chikara Kurofune Kimashita." (Japanese: 南の地から黒船来ました。)	Daisuke Kurose	Tomoko Konparu	Daisuke Kurose	July 2, 2018
Ranmaru, a Komainu and manager of Orio-ya, announces he is there to collect his missing employees. Hatori warns Aoi to be careful as a second person leaves the ship. Ougan-douji, the blonde Zashiki-warashi, who built both Tenjin-ya and Orio-ya and still acts as Orio-ya's Mistress Innkeeper. She demands that both Hatori and Tokihiko return and also reveals that she once made a deal with Ginji allowing him to work at Tenjin-ya for 50 years, and now the 50 years are over he is to return to Orio-ya at once. Ginji goes without argument, upsetting Aoi. Ginji puts on his old Orio-ya mask, furthering Aoi's suspicions he was her childhood Ayakashi. With even Odanna bowing to Ougan-douji's wishes Aoi tempts Nobunaga, Tokihiko's pet dog and Orio-ya's mascot, off the boat with cookies then holds him hostage in exchange for Ginji. However, Ougan-douji casts a spell on Aoi who begins experiencing flashbacks of her memories of Tenjin-ya. She awakens on Orio-ya's ship, having been kidnapped by Ougan-douji who prevented Odanna from saving her and has taken her Tengu fan. Ranmaru threatens to put her on display for their customers as the famous Ogre Bride and granddaughter of Shiro. Ginji protects Aoi from Ranmaru just as they arrive at Orio-ya.
15	15	"I Was Abducted from an Ayakashi Inn."; Transliteration: "Ayakashi o Yado Kara Sarawaremashita." (Japanese: あやかしお宿から攫われました。)	Hiromichi Matano	Miharu Hirami	Hiromichi Matano	July 9, 2018
Ougan-douji immediately leaves to go to the North West. Aoi is greeted with hostility by Orio-ya's staff and is imprisoned by Ranmaru. Aoi is given a meal by a young boy named Taichi, a Night Sparrow. She finds that Chibi has stowed away in her pocket and he manages to free her by bribing Nobunaga with food in exchange for the key. Ranmaru catches her and reveals he hates humans because he knew her grandfather, Shiro. He reminds Ginji he has to help organise an important firework event. Hideyoshi, a monkey like Ayakashi, tries to return Aoi to her cell but before he can Hatori's father, Matsuba the Tengu Elder appears and, seeing Aoi being mistreated, loses his temper with the staff and flies into a rage, only being calmed when Aoi offers to cook his breakfast. Ranmaru forbids Aoi from using the main kitchen so Ginji takes her to a disused outbuilding with a small kitchen instead. Hatori also helps by bringing equipment he pilfered from the main kitchen. Aoi manages to make Matsuba an excellent seafood breakfast so Ranmaru reluctantly decides she can continue cooking in the outbuilding, but first orders her to thoroughly clean it. Aoi is bullied by Orio-ya's Young Mistress, Nene, who injures Aoi's ankle by tripping her. Aoi refuses to try and return to Tenjin-ya without Ginji. Ranmaru orders Aoi to cook for Matsuba every day until the firework event and steals the crystal hairpin Odanna gave her, threatening to throw it in the ocean if she tries to escape.
16	16	"The Twin Chefs and a Rain Woman from a Rich Family."; Transliteration: "Futago no Itamae to Ame Onna no Ojō-sama." (Japanese: 双子の板前と雨女のお嬢様。)	Tomoe Makino	Yoriko Tomita	Tomoe Makino	July 16, 2018
Aoi frets over being forced to cook every day since she has no way to get fresh ingredients, until she finds a box of fresh fish which she suspects was arranged by Odanna. At Tenjin-ya the entire staff worry about Aoi and work to keep Moonflower in good condition. Byakuya reveals that Odanna has been absent since Aoi was kidnapped, suggesting he is planning something. Aoi continues to suffer harassment from Orio-ya's staff but also keeps having ingredients delivered by somebody. She meets a masked Ayakashi who turns out to be Odanna disguised as a fish merchant. He offers to help her escape but she refuses to leave without Ginji. Odanna reveals Ginji has an important job, the firework event, a once in a century ceremony that Orio-ya must complete to fight the curse the land is under, but they are struggling with the preparations, so much so they had to use Aoi to keep Matsuba from leaving. Odanna casts a spell on Aoi's ogre fire necklace. Aoi is approached by Orio-ya's chefs, the Black and White Crane twins Kai and Mei. One of Orio-ya's guests, Yodoko, is a Rain Woman who makes it rain when she loses her temper, and since rain would ruin the fireworks they have to keep her happy. They want Aoi to cook for her since Yodoko has grown tired of Orio-ya's menu. Aoi meets Yodoko who turns out to be a spoiled rich girl, but who has heard of Aoi and Moonflower. Aoi decides to make Monjayaki. Aoi meets a very young boy employed at Orio-ya by Ranmaru after his parents died and Aoi realises Ranmaru actually cares a lot about helping the people of the South.
17	17	"The Secret of the Ceremony in the Southern Land."; Transliteration: "Minami no Chi no Gishiki no Himitsu." (Japanese: 南の地の儀式の秘密。)	Ken Katō	Miharu Hirami	Hidetoshi Namura	July 23, 2018
Yodoko tries the monjayaki and finds it delicious. Hideyoshi is furious that Aoi dared to cook in a guest's room. Hatori is convinced Ougan-douji brought Aoi to Orio-ya for the ceremony. He explains the southern land is notorious for natural disasters, such as typhoons, because of a curse spreading Ayakashi called Umi-bouzo who lives in the ocean. The ceremony is used to calm the Ayakashi. The only two people capable of performing the ceremony are Ranmaru and Ginji. They have been working to locate five national treasures needed for the ceremony, the Rainbow Umbrella, Tengu Secret Alcohol, a mermaid's scale, Hourai's Gem Branch, and food made from the ocean's treasures. Yodoko owns the rainbow umbrella. Hatori is trying to convince Matsuba to hand over the Tengu alcohol and it is assumed the ocean treasure food will be seafood cooked by Aoi. Odanna appears and reveals Aoi's necklace has been absorbing her spiritual power to become her Ayakashi follower, which Odanna explains is caused by her spiritual power merging with his Ogre Fire, the result being a childlike Ayakashi Odanna describes as being like their first child. They name her Ai and ask her to transform into a clone of Aoi so they can go to the harbour without being caught. There Aoi sees how badly the southern land is affected by the disasters. The only available jobs are as Orio-ya staff or as fisherman, but the southern lands ocean is dangerous and many fisherman die leaving their children homeless orphans. At the beach Odanna finds a rare rainbow clam shell he gives to Aoi, explaining that they are rumoured to come from the Eternal Realm, another realm separate from both the human and Ayakashi realms. The Southern land is closest to the Eternal Realm, but there is an island off the coast even closer to the Eternal Realm that it is forbidden for anyone to visit, and it is there the ceremony must be performed. At that moment there is an explosion at Orio-ya.
18	18	"A Big Fight between a Tengu Father and His Son."; Transliteration: "Tengu no Oyako no Dai Kenka." (Japanese: 天狗の親子の大喧嘩。)	Satoshi Toba	Yoriko Tomita	Mie Ōishi	July 30, 2018
The explosion is revealed to be Hatori and Matsuba fighting over the Tengu Alcohol. Matsuba calms down after both Aoi and Ranmaru intervene. Aoi tells Ranmaru she will get the alcohol instead. Hatori reveals the reason Matsuba banished him. Matsuba wanted to marry a human woman but eventually he married a Heron Ayakashi named Sasara and Hatori was their third son. Sasara was very loving but Matsuba was not a good father or husband. Sasara tried cooking Game-ni, a dish made by Matsuba's human mother, but it made Matsuba angry when it didn't taste the same. This made Hatori fight him, and when he lost he stole the Tengu Alcohol for revenge, causing Matsuba to banish him. After finding a photograph of Sasara Aoi comes up with a plan. She asks Odanna to help her cook an important meal for Hatori and Matsuba. This makes Odanna happy as he always wanted to help her cook, though he is less happy when Aoi forces him to trim his Ogre fingernails before cooking. They make two types of Game-ni. Aoi convinces Matsuba and Hatori to compare the two Game-ni's. Hatori ends up preferring one while Matsuba prefers the other and Aoi reveals that she had worked out the different recipes used by Matsuba's mother and by Hatori's mother, and they both chose the types made by their mothers. Aoi then faints from exhaustion and Odanna helps her rest. He explains that Aoi's relationship with her mother was the reason she tried so hard for Matsuba and Hatori to reconcile. For Aoi's sake they both apologise to each other. Matsuba rescinds Hatori's exile and gives him the Tengu Alcohol. As they return to Orio-ya an unknown Ayakashi watches Aoi secretly.
19	19	"A Silver Beast on a Moonlit Night."; Transliteration: "Tsuki no Yoru no Gin no Kemono." (Japanese: 月の夜の銀の獣。)	Nobukage Kimura	Tomoko Konparu	Nanase Tomii	August 6, 2018
Ranmaru has a meeting with the Ayakashi who has been watching Aoi, Raiju, a Thunder Beast who controls lightning. Hatori warns Aoi to stay away from Raiju as he can be dangerous. Aoi finds Ginji at a shrine injured by miasma. Aoi feeds him her spiritual energy food, curing him. Ginji admits he is struggling to find the scale as mermaids are so rare they are almost extinct, though some may exist in the Dragon Palace, the mermaid's former home, but it is afflicted by a curse and staying there too long can kill. The shrine was built by a woman named Princess Iso, the daughter of a mermaid. She could see the future and was called Shrine Maiden of Guidance. She raised Ginji and Ranmaru and they managed to identify the curse Ayakashi, a mass of impure energy named Umi-bouzo who is actually gentle and has no desire to spread disaster. Princess Iso performed the ceremony every 100 years, but 300 years ago she was betrayed, the ceremony failed and to save the Southern Land she jumped into the ocean, trapping the miasma in the Dragon Palace before dying. Soon after Ougan-douji built Orio-ya and Ranmaru became obsessed with making it more successful than Tenjin-ya. Ginji eventually parted ways with Ranmaru and went to Tenjin-ya, promising to return every 100 years for the ceremony. Ranmaru suddenly appears at the shrine also covered in miasma from the Dragon Palace. Aoi looks after him, feeding him spiritual energy food until he awakens. Rather than show gratitude he manipulates Aoi into agreeing to get the mermaid scale, as the miasma does not affect humans, though he does agree to allow Ginji to return to Tenjin-ya if she succeeds. Odanna appears and insists on going with her.
20	20	"Traces of a Dream in the Dragon Palace."; Transliteration: "Ryū Miyagi no Yume no Ato." (Japanese: 竜宮城の夢の跡。)	Sumito Sasaki	Miharu Hirami	Hidetoshi Namura	August 13, 2018
Odanna explains he can survive the miasma of the Dragon Palace because his power is different from Ginji and Ranmaru's. As they enter the Dragon Palace Aoi sinks into the sand and lands in a throne room next to Princess Iso. She shows Aoi a vision of the Southern Land 1000 years ago before the disasters. Iso recalls raising Ginji and Ranmaru to one day protect the Southern Land together. She also reveals she is dead, her body somewhere inside the Dragon Palace with the miasma trapped inside it, while Aoi has been talking to the memory imprint she left behind. She tells Aoi she must be the one to cook ocean treasure food and asks her to care for Ginji and Ranmaru before sending her back. As Aoi awakens she discovers the Mermaid Scale embedded in a wall and also finds she is wearing Princess Iso's bracelet. Aoi is attacked by an Ogre infected with the miasma. Odanna destroys the ogre, causing Aoi to cry when she sees Odanna injured. They almost kiss but Odanna kisses her forehead instead. Aoi becomes convinced the ceremony will only succeed if Ginji and Ranmaru reconcile. Odanna promises that Tenjin-ya will support the ceremony, albeit in secret. Aoi makes a new deal with Ranmaru, she will work at Orio-ya as long as Ginji does, but only if she is allowed to prepare the ocean treasure. Ranmaru agrees after hearing how she retrieved the Mermaid Scale. Aoi and Ginji decide the ocean treasure food will be made of ingredients from the Hidden and the human realms.
21	21	"Orio-ya's Young Hostess and Young Master."; Transliteration: "Orio-ya no Wakaokami to Waka Danna." (Japanese: 折尾屋の若女将と若旦那。)	Hiromichi Matano	Yoriko Tomita	Hiromichi Matano	August 20, 2018
Following Aoi locating the Mermaid Scale Raiju takes an even greater interest in her. Aoi begins researching Ocean Treasure recipes served at previous ceremonies. Oryo arrives at Orio-ya as a guest and immediately clashes with Nene. Ranmaru leaves Orio-ya for an important task. Toad Ayakashi cause trouble by demanding to stay at Orio-ya in exchange for the last item, Hourai's Gem Branch. Their leader, a wealthy merchant called Yukichi, becomes angry at Nene, until Oryo steps in and resolves the situation. Nene becomes depressed and reverts to her Ayakashi form, a small, fluffy pink rat. As Nene is needed for the ceremony Hatori gives her the day off to recover and asks Aoi to look after her. After eating Aoi's food Nene regains enough energy to grow in size but not to change back. Aoi convinces Nene to go shopping with her. While buying coconut jellies they encounter Odanna, in disguise, working at the jelly stall, though Nene does not realise who he is. Nene admits she admired Oryo's hostess skills so much she got a job as a room attendant, but as Oryo was more skilled her admiration became jealousy. Aoi assures her she is an incredible person for being honest about her jealousy. Nene apologises for injuring Aoi's ankle and suddenly changes back into her human form. Aoi buys coconut milk and coconut oil from Odanna. Aoi learns from Nene she was close to Hideyoshi when they were children and that Hideyoshi has feelings for her but never told her because Nene likes Ranmaru. Aoi decides Orio-ya is a nicer inn than she first thought.
22	22	"Raiju's Warning."; Transliteration: "Raijū no Keikoku." (Japanese: 雷獣の警告。)	Ken Katō	Miharu Hirami	Yoshiko Okuda	August 27, 2018
The Toads hand over Hourai's Gem Branch but only Raiju can tell if it is genuine and he refuses to. Hideyoshi begs Aoi to cook something for Raiju but Ginji refuses on her behalf and instead sends the Twin chefs, Mai and Kei, to cook for him, but Raiji refuses their food. Aoi and Ginji discuss love. Aoi thinks she may have felt love for her childhood Ayakashi but cannot remember. Aoi becomes tipsy on alcohol and reveals she is annoyed at Odanna because she does not know why he wants to marry her. Raiju approaches Aoi and his intimidating behaviour and control of lightning, which Aoi has a phobia of, causes her to run. Raiju insults her cooking; pointing out that Aoi cannot use food to pacify him as what he wants to eat the most is Aoi herself. He suggests Shiro wanted Aoi to marry Odanna for that very reason, to protect her by making Odanna her guardian. He then tricks her into eating a sweet, as an apology, and reveals the reason for his troublesome behaviour is boredom; nothing has excited him since Shiro. What he really wants is for Aoi to stop him being bored. Aoi runs away and comes across Ranmaru who warns Raiju to leave Aoi alone. Raiju explains that Hourai Gem Branches came from a tree given to the Ayakashi King, but the tree burned down with only a few branches surviving, and after centuries no one knows where most of them are. Ranmaru warns Aoi it was Raiju who ruined the ceremony 300 years ago and to stay away from him. Aoi begins cooking a lot of food with help from Ginji, the twins, Ai and even Chibi so Ranmaru can decide if her food is suitable. Aoi suddenly faints and encounters a dark voice passing on a warning.
23	23	"The Sealed Power and the Opening Heart."; Transliteration: "Fūjirareta Chikara to Hirakareru Kokoro." (Japanese: 封じられた力と開かれる心。)	Tomoe Makino	Miharu Hirami	Akira Nishimori	September 3, 2018
Aoi dreams her childhood Ayakashi told her to keep living so she could fall in love with him and marry him. Aoi finds she has lost her voice and her sense of taste. Tokihiko realises it is a curse from the sweet Raiju forced her to eat, a cursed seed that blocked Aoi's sense of taste. As she is now unable to adequately cook for the Umi-bouzo Ranmaru gives the job to Mai and Kei. Raiju taunts Aoi for losing her usefulness as a chef. He tries food she made and insults its flavour, despite greedily finishing the whole plate. As he threatens to eat her Giniji arrives and stops him, despite Raiju's threats to sabotage the ceremony. Byakuya suddenly arrives, warning Raiju that Aoi legally belongs to Odanna. Raiju, who is terrified of Byakuya, flees. Byakuya brings the royal couple, Nuinoin and Ritsuko, to Orio-ya as they own a genuine Hourai Gem Branch they are willing to give to Orio-ya in return for Aoi and Ginji's freedom. Nuinoin reveals their branch is inside a magical painting regrowing into a tree atop a mountain. Ranmaru and Ginji argue over how to retrieve it as entering the painting consumes massive amounts of spirit energy. Byakuya suggests they take Aoi so her food can continually recharge their energy. He gives Aoi a medicine made by Shizuna that successfully returns her voice but not her taste. Byakuya warns them all to avoid the fog inside the painting as it can cause their hidden desires to appear as illusions. He then unlocks the painting with a magic key.
24	24	"Life-or-Death Hunt for the Gem Branch."; Transliteration: "Tama no Eda Sabaibaru." (Japanese: 玉の枝サバイバル。)	Nanase Tomii	Tomoko Konparu	Mie Ōishi	September 10, 2018
Inside the painting they set off to find the rainbow spiritual power that will lead them to the branch. Ranmaru tries to scout ahead but his spiritual energy is so drained he reverts to his Ayakashi form, a small red puppy, and has to drink Aoi's hot cocoa to recover. Ginji finds a book about Umi-bouzo. His job was to manage the miasma caused by the Yokai and humans in the Eternal Realm, until humans imprisoned him in the ocean. Ginji tells Aoi 300 years ago they also needed a Hourai Gem Branch which Raiju promised to provide. However, Raiju insulted Princess Iso, tricking Ginji into defending her and insulting Raiju who then withheld the Branch. This led to the ceremony's failure and Princess Iso's death. Ginji wants to reconcile with Ranmaru but does not know how. Aoi finally asks Ginji if he was her childhood Ayakashi, but before he can answer they are surrounded by fog which projects an illusion of Princess Iso. They race to find Ranmaru in time to stop the fake Iso leading him over a cliff. Aoi accidentally falls over instead, forcing Ranmaru to jump and catch her. At the bottom Ranmaru expresses his belief Ginji would be happy if the fall had killed him, though Aoi assures him Ginji still thinks of him as family. She reveals she has Iso's bracelet and that Iso told her to cook the Ocean Treasure. Ranmaru is so moved he cries for a moment. At the mountain they find the fully grown Hourai Tree. Ginji also arrives and is so happy he reverts to his baby fox form so he can hug Ranmaru in his puppy form. Aoi retrieves a branch then signals Byakuya to bring them back. As they are leaving Aoi sees Odanna congratulating her on a job well done, though it may have been another illusion. With the Gem Branch now found the Orio-ya staff begin preparing the ceremony right away. Kai and Mei tell Aoi they are refusing to cook the Ocean Treasure and want her do it instead.
25	25	"A Fireworks Event with Ayakashi."; Transliteration: "Ayakashi-tachi to Hanabi Taikai." (Japanese: あやかしたちと花火大会。)	Shinji Sano	Tomoko Konparu	Hidetoshi Namura	September 17, 2018
Ranmaru agrees to let Aoi cook as Princess Iso had wanted. Hideyoshi spots Umi-bouzo approaching so Ranmaru orders the fireworks ceremony start. However, Raiju had spread word about the fireworks and a large number of guests arrive on airships to watch, forcing Ranmaru to cancel the fireworks to prevent them hitting the airships. Odanna arrives and reveals he has brought the Tenjin-ya guests on his airships and offers his staff to Orio-ya if his guests can stay, thwarting Raiju's sabotage. Akatsuki guides the airships away from the fireworks while Oryo helps Nene serve the new guests. Ranmaru gives Aoi back her hairpin and Ginji, in his female form for the ceremony, gives Aoi a new kimono from Odanna to help her focus. They arrive at Jouno Island for the ceremony. Ginji explains Umi-bouzo will sit in the shrine behind a screen to hide his true appearance. He will eat Ocean treasure and drink Tengu Alcohol while watching Ginji and Ranmaru dancing. It is vital no one sees Umi-bouzo's face or they will be cursed with misfortune. Aoi and the twins begin cooking while Umi-bouzo arrives, a giant vaguely human shaped mass of miasma with red eyes. Ranmaru and Ginji begin dancing while Aoi delivers the first course, simmered bacon and pumpkin, cold Hors d'oeuvres of tofu and sea urchin and squid shumai. Aoi lifts the screen to deliver it and is surprised that Umi-bouzo's real hand is smaller than a child's. She also offers him a menu to choose exactly what food he would like to eat, something no one else has ever asked him at previous ceremonies. Umi-bouzo selects stir fried shrimp with a miso-mayonnaise paste. As Aoi delivers the shrimp, which is served with cucumber, disaster strikes as Chibi jumps out of Aoi's kimono and chases the cucumber under the screen to where Umi-bouzo is sitting. Aoi panics and lifts the screen all the way to try and catch him, then screams as she sees Umi-bouzo's face.
26	26	"Delicious Dishes are Served at the Inn for Spirits."; Transliteration: "Ayakashi o Yado ni Umai Sakana Arimasu." (Japanese: あやかしお宿に美味い肴あります。)	Ken Katō	Tomoko Konparu	Yoshiko Okuda	September 24, 2018
Umi-bouzo turns out to be a small crying child. Chibi scolds Aoi for not talking to Umi-bouzo as he is lonely and no one ever talks to him. Determined to make Umi-bouzo feel better Aoi lifts the screen, giving him a clear view and allowing everybody to see him. Aoi is given Tengu Alcohol and has a vision of Umi-bouzo trapped within the miasma, only allowed to leave his prison once a century. Aoi realises Umi-bouzo feels the same as she does and hugs him. Kai and Mei serve a quiche and Aoi finds her taste has returned. Ranmaru is forced to admit the appropriate mood for the ceremony is gone and he and Ginji join them. Umi-bouzo becomes so happy his dark miasma turns pink, but eventually he has to go back to the ocean. Aoi asks him to stay but he has to refuse, so instead Aoi gives him more food and Chibi gives him a Rainbow Clam pearl. Umi-bouzo leaves, hoping to see them at the next ceremony, though Aoi does not tell him that at the next ceremony in 100 years she will already be dead. As Umi-bouzo leaves Aoi finally remembers Ginji was her childhood Ayakashi. Odanna, knowing everything Raiju did to Aoi, threatens to eat him and destroy his soul if he ever hurts Aoi again. Aoi finally confronts Ginji, who admits he did visit when she was a child, but he was not the first to visit her. He refuses to confirm if Odanna was the first and instead thanks her for making the ceremony a success. Ginji and Ranmaru realise the truth, everyone believes Umi-bouzo causes disasters and must be made happy to prevent them. But the disasters actually come from a dark place that appears every 100 years and Umi-bouzo keeps the disasters away by gaining power from the ceremony. Ranmaru credits Aoi with the discovery and changes the ceremony to one that thanks Umi-bouzo for keeping everyone safe. With the ceremony over the Tenjin-ya and Orio-ya staff say their goodbyes while Ougan-douji secretly watches and smiles. Aoi promises Odanna that one day she will repay everything he has done for her as they finally return to Tenjin-ya.

=== Season 2 (2025) ===
No. overall	No. in season	Title	Directed by (Note: Production staff information is taken from the ending credits of each episode.)	Written by	Storyboarded by	Original release date
27	1	"Our Tanuki Is Getting Married."; Transliteration: "Tanuki no Yomeiri." (Japanese: 狸の嫁入り。)	Shin Yamamoto	Tomoko Konparu	Namako Umino	October 2, 2025
Aoi continues running Moonflower with Ai, who has designed a new body for herself. Ranmaru and Hatori arrive on their airship bringing compensation for the discovery of Umi-bouzo's true nature. They also discuss unsettling news about Raiju causing trouble in Youto. Due to his workload Ranmaru is forced to leave, so Aoi advises Ginji to visit Orio-ya soon to see him. Ginji reveals Hideyoshi and Nene plan to get married. At Dr Saraku's request Aoi works on a new bun as a signature souvenir for Tenjin-ya's gift shop. Everyone is upset Kasuga is leaving to get married as she is a daughter of Lord Ieyasu Oodanuki, an Imperial Minister, who has planned for her to marry the new Chief of Hyouri Castle, linking the North-western lands to the Northern lands through marriage. Kasuga is confused why Aoi continues to refuse to marry Odanna despite growing closer to him. Kasuga admits political marriages are common for Tanuki who are weak in body but intelligent and great collectors of information. She is also happy with her future husband, Kiyo, a childhood friend she had a crush on. Aoi worries she doesn't know anything personal about Odanna so she asks him if he was involved with her meeting Ginji when she was a child. Odanna refuses to answer for personal reasons. Aoi feels mild frustration to have learned nothing, not even Odanna's real name as "Odanna" simply means "Master of the House".
28	2	"I'll Make New Hot-Spring Buns."; Transliteration: "Atarashī Onsen Manjū o Tsukurimasu." (Japanese: 新しい温泉まんじゅうを作ります。)	Gonsuke Kimura	Tomoko Konparu	Gonsuke Kimura	October 9, 2025
Oryo refuses to accept Kasuga marrying Kiyo. Chiaki reveals as a child Kiyo was sickly and Kasuga would visit him in the hospital. Eventually, their fascination with the human world caused them to run away to visit, but they became lost for three days. Kiyo grew sicker and Kasuga was sent to Tenjin-ya. Odanna admits Kasuga marrying feels like losing a granddaughter. Aoi wonders if Odanna wants to marry her anymore as he never talks about it. Kasuga finds the other servants don't allow her to work in case she is injured before the wedding, so Aoi invites her to work at Moonflower. Aoi decides on an egg bun and a cheese bun for the shop. Ginji also asks for pumpkin flavoured snacks for the Fall Festival. Saraku designs wrappers for the buns while Shizuna teaches her hell-steaming using geothermal heat, which should keep the buns edible for 20 days. Kasuga names them Inferno Buns. Byakuya decides to start selling them once Aoi gets Odanna's permission. Aoi discovers Tenjin-ya has a magically concealed roof garden Odanna tends himself. He also reveals there is a manor house in the garden that belongs to Ougon-douji, but it is only visible as a reflection in the fountain. Odanna enjoys the buns and almost kisses her, then reveals he was only teasing. He decides to harvest his pumpkins, which he only grows to give away as he doesn't like them. Aoi decides to make pumpkin snacks that will change his mind.
29	3	"The Curtain Rises on New Turmoil."; Transliteration: "Aratanaru Sōdō no Makuake." (Japanese: 新たなる騒動の幕開け。)	Kamadon	Tomoko Konparu	Namako Umino	October 16, 2025
As Oryo is still unhappy Kasuga suggests she try become assistant hostess again. At the festival Kasuga helps two customers who lost a bracelet. Aoi makes pumpkin potage which Ginji is sure Odanna will like. Kasuga chases a crow that stole the bracelet onto Tenjin-ya's roof. Aoi recognises the crow as one that bothered her in Odanna's garden. Oryo insists Kasuga can handle retrieving a guests property. Kasuga successfully trades the bracelet for an Inferno bun, and though she falls off the roof Oryo catches her. Oryo accepts Kasuga is leaving and joins the other employees in saying goodbye. Kasuga assures Aoi they are certain to meet again, especially if Aoi marries Odanna. Odanna visits Moonflower to try Aoi's pumpkin cuisine and is amused Aoi resembles a wife cooking for her husband. Odanna gives Aoi a key made of obsidian and asks her to keep it safe as he has been summoned to the Imperial Capital by the Ayakashi Emperor. He claims if she wants to know him she will spend his absence finding the lock the key opens, but warns she might hate what she learns about him. Aoi claims she could never hate him after everything he has done for her. Odanna suddenly kisses her and expresses his wish that one day she will be his wife. A month later Odanna has not returned from the capital. Raiju appears with news the Ayakashi Emperor has made him the new master of Tenjin-ya.
30	4	"I'm Opening a Food Truck."; Transliteration: "Kicchin Kā de Shutten Shimasu." (Japanese: キッチンカーで出店します。)	Taika Miyagi	Tomoko Konparu	Namako Umino	October 23, 2025
Byakuya reveals the decision won't be final until all the Hachiyo vote on Tenjin-ya's transferral. Raiju reveals all Hachiyo will be present at a meeting in the New Year, when he will demand a vote. Byakuya and Sasuke leave for the Imperial Capital on the ship Seika-maru, taking Aoi with them. Aoi opens a food truck on Seika-maru's deck and serves a cheeseburger to an Ayakashi she suspects is a noble travelling incognito. Byakuya has Sasuke sneak Aoi into Nuinoin and Ritsuko's castle in the capital, explaining Ai will return to Tenjin-ya disguised as her so no one realises she is missing. Ritsuko explains Odanna was imprisoned after Raiju forcibly unmasked his true Ayakashi form in front of the Emperor, one of the greatest shames an Ayakashi can suffer. A political faction is using the incident to demand the abolishment of the Hachiyo and bring the Eight Kingdoms and their wealth back under control of the Imperial Court. The Emperor was formerly against this but since the unmasking has begun supporting abolishment, as Odanna's true form was revealed to be taboo. Ritsuko asks Aoi for help with Takechiyo, the Emperor's grandson living with them, who dislikes the physical act of eating, so he eats almost nothing. Ritsuko explains Takechiyo was the Imperial heir, but his mother was a concubine, so when an official wife gave birth to a son Takechiyo was replaced as heir by his new-born half-brother. The shock left his mother unable to eat so she was moved to hospital in the Land of Literature. When this upset Takechiyo the Emperor sent him to Nuinoin's castle as punishment.
31	5	"A Kid's Lunch I Poured My Heart Into."; Transliteration: "Omoi o Kometa Okosama Ranchi." (Japanese: 想いを込めたお子様ランチ。)	Ryuta Nakano	Tomoko Konparu	Namako Umino	October 30, 2025
Takechiyo learns Aoi is Shiro's granddaughter and reveals there are children's picture books of Shiro's exploits. Aoi gets him interested in food by offering to cook meals she fed Shiro. Ritsuko takes them ingredient shopping in Tsukinome, the noble district closest to the Imperial Palace. Takechiyo admits he likes Mikan fruit, which he used to receive from the Emperor. Takechiyo assists Aoi in making several of Shiro's favourite dishes. Ritsuko is overjoyed Takechiyo eats a full meal, including vegetables. Takechiyo wishes his mother could try the food as well, so Aoi writes down the recipes for him. Takechiyo lets Aoi read his books. That night Aoi dreams of the day her great-grandmother died, and Shiro blamed himself for being cursed. Aoi reads the book and learns Shiro fought the demons of Oni-no-gashima with help from an Iron Boar, a Copper Bear and Silver Pigeon whom he rewarded with macarons. Aoi promises to make macarons for Takechiyo. While shopping for ingredients for Moonflower Sasuke forces Aoi to hide when a ship flies overhead belonging to Daikokushi Confections, a business owned by the South-Eastern Hachiyo loyal to the Imperial Court. Sasuke explains the entire group hates ogres, including Odanna. The head of Daikokushi, Zakuro, has been openly hostile to Odanna for years and repeatedly makes trouble for Tenjin-ya. Ougon-douji's voice suddenly calls Aoi towards a portal of black smoke. Inside she finds a locked red door she opens with Odanna's obsidian key. Inside she finds an obsidian obelisk covered in writing. Odanna's voice apologises to her as he can't return to her in his original form. A blue door appears she also unlocks and finds a cemetery. She is suddenly confronted by Raiju.
32	6	"About the Master Innkeeper."; Transliteration: "Odanna-sama no Koto." (Japanese: 大旦那様のこと。)	Otaki Isao	Tomoko Konparu	Namako Umino	November 6, 2025
Raiju reveals Odanna escaped prison, so he intends to have Odanna captured and judged in public to ensure he is sealed away forever. Sasuke and Byakuya rescue Aoi, causing Raiju to reveal Odanna is an Ogre-devil, a universally despised species. Byakuya teleports them safely to Silhouette, a watch-maker's shop owned by Shimon, Dr Saraku's brother. Byakuya reveals 500 years ago the Ogre Kingdom was a hellish place. Tenjin Castle was built as a prison for Odanna until Ougon-doji set him free. Odanna was still just a child and possessed a dignified, pure soul. Almost as if reacting to his purity the Ogre Kingdom was transformed into a green, water filled paradise, so Ougon-doji turned the castle into the Tenjin-ya inn and made Odanna the Master Inkeeper. Odanna hired Byakuya and Saraku as his first employees and made Tenjin-ya prosperous. Unfortunately, a past Emperor was murdered by an Ogre-devil, leading to a tradition of sealing them away. As ruler, the Emperor must have Odanna sealed, even though he has committed no crime. His fate will be decided at the Hachiyo Meeting where he will require at least 5 votes to be reinstated as Tenjin-ya's master. Aoi decides to somehow find her way to Odanna with the obsidian key. Returning to Tenjin-ya she notices the hairpin given to her by Odanna has bloomed into a Camellia flower. She decides to make sushi for everyone. Ginji admits he has struggled trying to do Odanna's job but Aoi assures him doing what he can is enough to be proud of, making him blush.
33	7	"I'm Infiltrating the Imperial Court."; Transliteration: "Kyūchū ni Sennyū Shimasu." (Japanese: 宮中に潜入します。)	Shin Yamamoto	Tomoko Konparu	Namako Umino	November 13, 2025
Hatori visits Aoi and warns her to beware the Hachiyo of the South-East, Zakuro, as she used to work at Tenjin-ya running a Teahouse. She eventually left to take over her family's sweets business, becoming the Imperial Court Confectioner and then Hachiyo. Since then she has become an enemy of Tenjin-ya, likely because in the past Ogre-devils would eat her species, the Azukiarai. Aoi returns to Nuinoin's estate to give Takechiyo the macarons she promised. Ritsuko reveals the Emperor no longer trusts them and had Takechiyo retrieved by General Akaguma. Also, Odanna's true nature is about to be made public. Byakuya is so troubled he seeks comfort in memories of his human wife Suzume, who died centuries ago. Nuinoin believes if Odanna's nature is made public the Anti-Hachiyo faction will start a war, just as Raiju planned. Nuinoin hopes like Shiro Aoi might have the power to foil Raiju's plans where Ayakashi would fail. Aoi is determined to get a macaron to Takechiyo somehow. Luckily, Byakuya reveals there is an secret tunnel from his and Suzume's old house he will lead Aoi and Sasuke through, as he has a message for the Emperor. Byakuya reveals when Suzume died it was young Odanna who gave him a reason to live again. Entering the palace Aoi gives Byakuya and Sasuke a macaron each in case they need the extra spirit power to escape. Aoi and Sasuke locate Takechiyo and find he is refusing food again.
34	8	"Food to Spur You On."; Transliteration: "Senaka o Osu o Ryōri." (Japanese: 背中を押すお料理。)	Taika Miyagi	Tomoko Konparu	Namako Umino	November 20, 2025
Byakuya goes straight to the court and requests the Emperor cease his prosecution against Odanna. Aoi gives Takechiyo the macarons. Zakuro appears and explains to Aoi Takechiyo cannot leave, so she will be ensuring he eats properly and Akaguma will be guarding him. She asks to try one of Aoi's macarons. Zakuro enjoys the macaron but doubts it will gain popularity. She claims this also applies to Aoi's cooking, which is only popular because it is new and exciting, but once the novelty wears off she will be forgotten. Takechiyo defends Aoi's cooking as having a purpose to help others, while Zakuro's sweets are extravagant but nothing else. Aoi agrees it doesn't matter if recipes last forever, what matters is that people enjoy them now. The Emperor agrees his treatment of Odanna is unjust, but he cannot ignore that Odanna is an Ogre-devil and must be sealed away. Raiju appears with a Revealing Mirror he used to reveal Odanna's true form, and reveals Byakuya's true form, a Hakutaku. The Emperor charges Byakuya with treason. Akaguma arrests Aoi but she is stolen away by Sasuke with the emergency spirit power from the macaron. Byakuya is also able to use his macaron to escape and carries Aoi and Sasuke to Orio-ya's ship Seiran-maru where Ranmaru and Ginji are waiting to take them North. Byakuya is exhausted after having his Hakutaku form forcefully revealed, so Aoi makes Oden in her food truck Ginji brought from the Seika-maru. Byakuya is confident Aoi has changed the hearts of so many with her food there is no possibility she will be forgotten.
35	9	"I'll Be Producer for the Northern Land."; Transliteration: "Kita no Chi o Purodūsu Shimasu." (Japanese: 北の地をプロデュースします。)	Daiki Taura & Tanabe Rin	Tomoko Konparu	Daiki Taura, Tanabe Rin & Shin Yamamoto	November 27, 2025
The group heads for Hyouri Castle to see Kasuga and Kiyo but encounter a Sky Pirate ship. Ginji leaps overboard with Aoi to deliver a message for Byakuya while Ranmaru deals with the pirates. They enter the underground roadway, tunnels used to travel while avoiding the freezing weather. They meet Chiaki who promises to deliver Byakuya's message to the Land of Literature. At Hyouri they reunite with Kasuga. Kiyo's aide Lesak tries to delay them but Kiyo meets with them immediately. Byakuya and Ranmaru appear, having defeated the pirates. Kiyo plans to support Odanna in exchange for help reviving the North's declining tourist industry. Byakuya and Ranmaru agree to offer tours of the Northern Lands by airship from Tenjin-ya and Orio-ya. Kiyo also asks Aoi to create a signature food item tourists can only get in the North. Aoi asks Kasuga to help her but Lesak scolds Aoi for asking a Hachiyo's wife to cook. Kasuga reminds Lesak as Odanna's fiancé Aoi is her equal and Lesak's superior, which angers Lesak further. Kasuga reveals her father Minister Ieyasu is assessing Kiyo's worth as Hachiyo to determine if the Land of Literature will support Odanna. Aoi realises the food item challenge will be important in determining Odanna's fate. Kasuga realises one of the ice plates the food is served on was a forgery generated by a Snow-woman and mixed with poison to kill Kasuga. Realising Kasuga has constantly feared poison since becoming Kiyo's wife Aoi decides to cook for her. Kasuga asks for Moonflower's Curry which Aoi makes with Northern mushrooms and fish. Byakuya returns to Tenjin-ya, leaving Ginji and Ranmaru to protect Aoi.
36	10	"Tiramisu of Memories."; Transliteration: "Omoide no Tiramisu." (Japanese: 思い出のティラミス。)	Daiki Taura, Tanabe Rin & Shin Yamamoto	Tomoko Konparu	Namako Umino	December 4, 2025
Kasuga remembers during their childhood visit to the Human Realm Kiyo enjoyed a specific dessert. For the new signature dish Aoi chooses Northern ingredients to make cheese fondue. Aoi is thrilled Kai and Mei are transferred from Orio-ya to help her. Ranmaru takes Ginji to tour Hyourei Shrine, made of unmelting Eternal Ice where the Animist Religion worships the Lord of Winter. They also view the Northern Lights where the Human and Hidden Realms are closest to each other. Ginji regrets Aoi couldn't see the lights so Ranmaru tells him to either steal Aoi from Odanna or forget about her. Ginji is certain Aoi loves Odanna, and he respects Odanna too much to hurt him. Ginji recalls Odanna sending him to be Aoi's childhood Ayakashi, though he is sure if Aoi ever learned this it would only make her love Odanna more. Kiyo shows Aoi Kasuga is growing strawberries from her homeland. Aoi senses their marriage is struggling so Kiyo admits he is so afraid of betrayal he can't even trust Kasuga, which makes him hate himself. Aoi learns Kasuga is researching human desserts. She tells Aoi the dessert Kiyo tried was chocolate, sweet but also bitter, and contained cheese. Aoi realises this is Tiramisu and promises to teach her to make it. Ginji tells Aoi about the Northern Lights and about another unique phenomena Kiyo has invited them to see. He also reveals her Inferno Buns have become so popular a lot of Shiro's debt to Tenjin-ya has now been repaid. Oryo visits with ingredients Aoi requested and helps her show Kasuga how to make Tiramisu.
37	11	"An Icy Assassin's Bullet."; Transliteration: "Kōri no Kyōdan ga Hanatarete." (Japanese: 氷の凶弾が放たれて。)	Kamadon & Shin Yamamoto	Tomoko Konparu	Namako Umino	December 11, 2025
Everyone uses Kiyo's ship Reirei-gou to visit Lake Kayaya near Oryo's village. The village was abandoned years ago and Oryo is unconcerned what happened to her family, since they sold her off as a servant. Ranmaru doesn't believe Kiyo has what it takes to be a Hachiyo. Kasuga overhears Kiyo planning to send her back to Tenjin-ya for safety, so she shouts at him for forgetting everything he promised her, then runs away. Aoi reminds Kiyo Kasuga loved him long before he was Hachiyo, then she gives him the Tiramisu, which reminds him he once dreamed of making the Northern Lands a better place with Kasuga. Aoi talks to Kasuga who decides to accept Kiyo's apology. A pirate sniper suddenly shoots at Kiyo from Kayaya Castle but hits Kasuga. Kasuga barely survives surgery as the bullet was made with poisoned ice. To get rid of the poison Kasuga requires a Rikodake mushroom within three days, which only grows in the mountains. Oryo volunteers to go as the mushrooms grew around her village. Ginji offers to carry her and Aoi in his fox form while Kiyo fights the pirates with Ranmaru. After a full day of searching Aoi and Ginji are forced to return to the village as the temperature drops. Oryo keeps searching while Aoi and Ginji find the village now full of Ice-wolf Ayakashi who decide to eat them both.
38	12	"On To the Next Theater."; Transliteration: "Tsugi no Butai e." (Japanese: 次の舞台へ。)	Shin Yamamoto & Taika Miyagi	Tomoko Konparu	Namako Umino	December 18, 2025
The wolves are scared away by an unseen ayakashi. Aoi collapses from the cold but awakens in the home of friendly Snow Fairies. While helping Ginji recover Aoi discovers the Fairies have Rikodake mushrooms. The Fairies offer the location of fresh mushrooms for a dessert to offer the Lord of Winter. Aoi makes mochi ice cream and they go with the Fairies and see the stars, which after the recent aurora are at their brightest, the other unique phenomena Kiyo wanted them to see. Ginji reminds her not to hide her feelings and she admits she is scared of never seeing Odanna again. The Lord of Winter turns out to be an Elder Tree Ayakashi that scared the wolves away. After enjoying the ice cream Oryo appears and reveals a legend says Rikodake grow by the Lord's feet. Retrieving a fresh Rikodake from his footprint, they return to Kasuga. Ranmaru admits Kiyo found his courage while fighting the pirates and might make a decent Hachiyo after all. Kasuga recovers and Kiyo apologises, promising they will never be apart again. Kiyo discovers it was his own aunt and uncle that sent the pirates after him, so he has them arrested. He also promises to vote for Odanna at the Hachiyo meeting. Aoi reveals her final choice for the Northern Lands new speciality foods; Tonkatsu Miso Ramen with butter, Vegetable Gyoza and Mochi and Strawberry Ice cream. All of Aoi's friends prepare to get Odanna back.

== Home releases ==
=== Japanese ===
In Japan, Happinet released the series in 9 volumes from July 3, 2018, to March 2, 2019.

Happinet (Japan, Region 2 / A)
Volume.	Episodes	Release date	Ref.
1	1–3	July 3, 2018	
2	4–6	August 2, 2018	
3	7–9	September 4, 2018	
4	10–12	October 2, 2018	
5	13–15	November 2, 2018	
6	16–18	December 4, 2018	
7	19–21	January 9, 2019	
8	22–24	February 2, 2019	
9	25–26	March 2, 2019	

=== English ===
Funimation (Region A, B)
Volume.	Episodes	Release date	Ref.
1	1–13	May 7, 2019	
2	14–26	September 3, 2019	
