= Konjaku Hyakki Shūi =

Third book of the Gazu Hyakki Yagyō tetralogy

Konjaku Hyakki Shūi (今昔百鬼拾遺; "Supplement to The Hundred Demons from the Present and the Past") is the third book of Japanese artist Toriyama Sekien's Gazu Hyakki Yagyō tetralogy, published c. 1781. These books are supernatural bestiaries, collections of ghosts, spirits, spooks and monsters, many of which Toriyama based on literature, folklore, and other artwork. These works have had a profound influence on subsequent yōkai imagery in Japan. Konjaku Hyakki Shūi is preceded in the series by Gazu Hyakki Yagyō and Konjaku Gazu Zoku Hyakki, and succeeded by Gazu Hyakki Tsurezure Bukuro.

A version of the tetralogy translated and annotated in English was published in 2016, which included this work, whose title is rendered as More of the Demon Horde from Past and Present.

== List of creatures ==
The three volumes were titled Cloud (雲), Mist (霧), and Rain (雨).

=== First Volume – Cloud ===
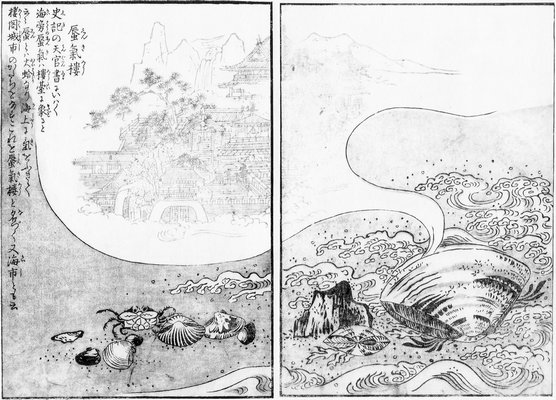
Shinkirō (ja:蜃気楼, mirage) is a clam that has grown to an enormous size, at which point it rises to the surface of the sea and breathes out a mirage of distant cities.

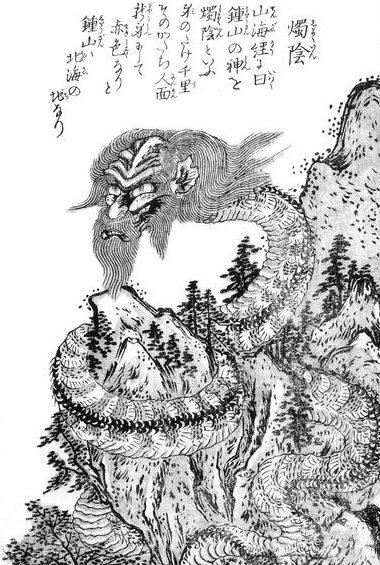
Shokuin (燭陰, torch in the yin) is the spirit of China's Purple Mountain. It appears as a red, man-faced dragon, a thousand ri tall, and is known as Zhuyin in China.

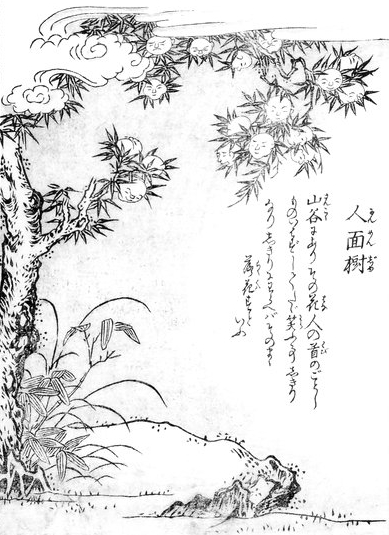
Ninmenju (人面樹, human-faced tree) is a tree that grows in remote mountains recesses, with flowers that resemble human faces. These faces are always smiling, even as they fall from their branches. Based on similar trees described in the Chinese Sancai Tuhui.

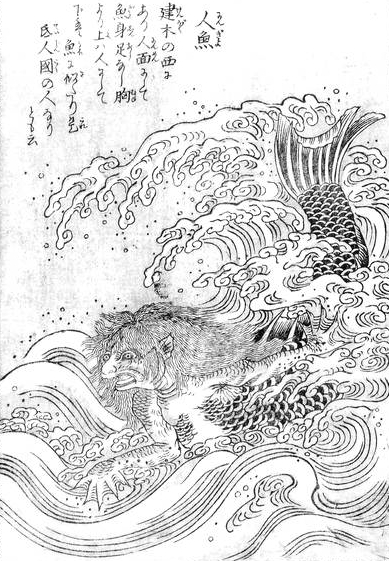
Ningyo (人魚, human fish or mermaid) is a sea creature which is human from the chest up, and a fish below.

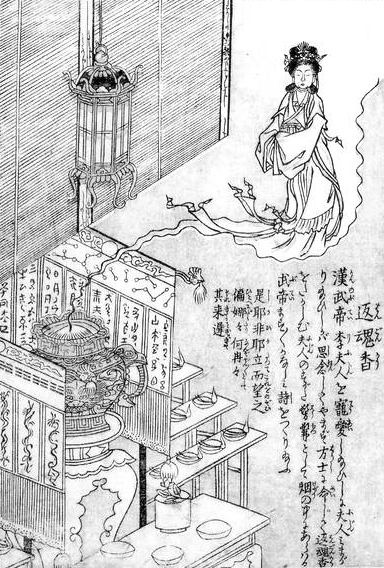
Hangonkō (ja:反魂香, 反魂香, soul-raising incense) is magical incense which can conjure up the spirits of the dead, originally described in Bai Juyi's Poetry of Lady Li.

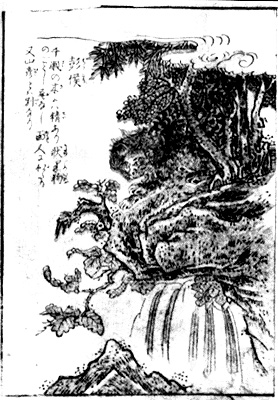
Hōkō (彭侯, drumbeat marquis) is a spirit which lives inside a thousand-year-old tree. It resembles a black dog with a human face and no tail. It is originally described in the 3rd century Chinese text Baize Tu, where it is known as Penghou

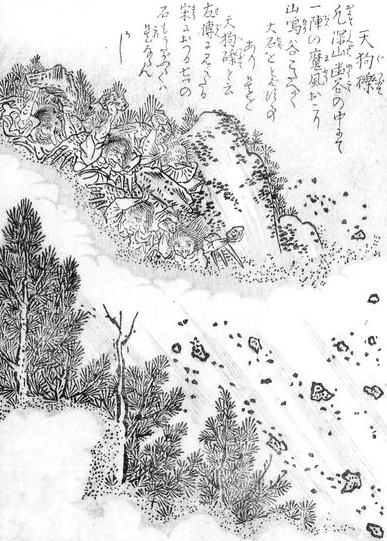
Tengutsubute (ja:天狗礫, tengu throwing stones) is a phenomenon in which stones are suddenly thrown through the air somewhere deep in the mountains. It is thought to be the work of the tengu.

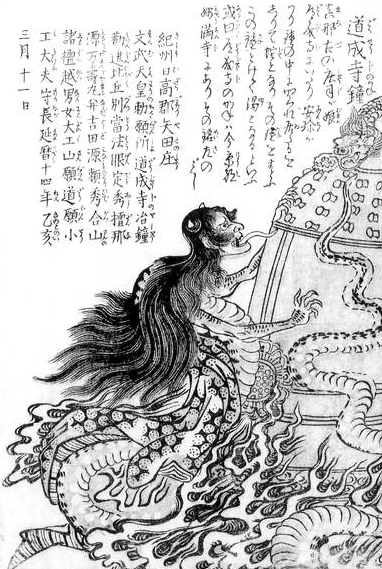
Dōjōji no kane (道成寺鐘, the bell of Dōjō-ji temple) is the bell which was melted by Kiyohime, a woman who fell in love with a young priest, and through the rage of unrequited love became a terrible serpent demon. When the priest fled and hid underneath this temple bell, the serpent surrounded the bell and destroyed herself and her would-be lover in flames of her rage.

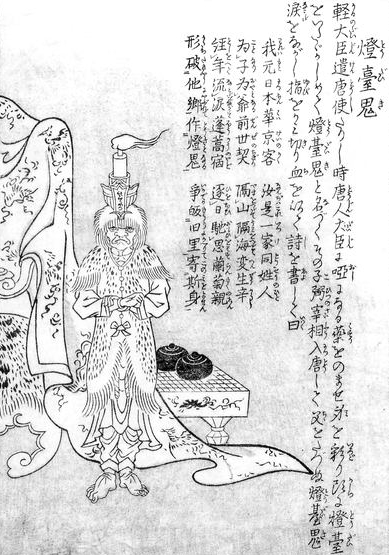
Tōdaiki (ja:灯台鬼, candle-stand demon) is a mute man with a candle on his head, sitting at the top of a lighthouse in China. According to legend, he was originally known as the Karu Minister, who went missing while on a mission to the Tang dynasty. His son later traveled to China to find his missing father, only to discover he had become the Tōdaiki at the top of a lighthouse.

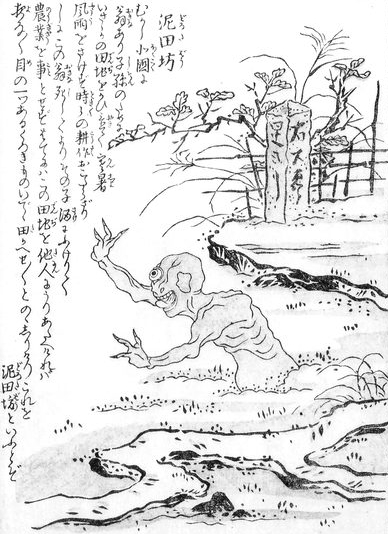
Dorotabō (ja:泥田坊, muddy rice field fellow) is the ghost of an old man who worked hard to pass on his rice fields to his descendants. His children squandered the fields and sold them to someone else, and so the old man appeared in the fields as a black, one-eyed creature crying for his rice fields to be returned.

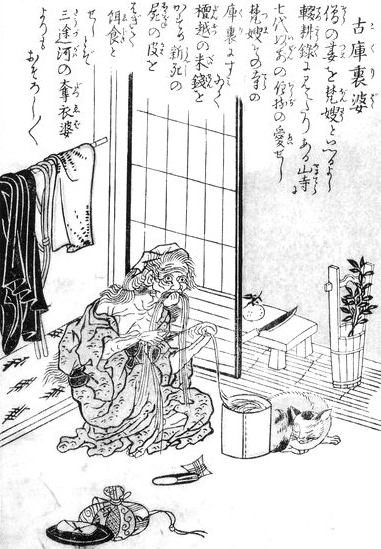
Kokuribaba (ja:古庫裏婆, hag of the old priest's quarters) was a woman who came to a mountain temple and was called the head priest's wife, because she lived in his quarters. She stole rice and money from the people who came to the temple, and as punishment became a terrible demon hag who eats the skin from corpses.

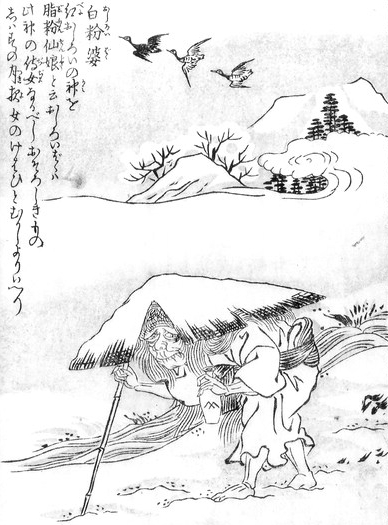
Oshiroibaba (ja:白粉婆, face-powder hag) is an old woman who is the assistant of Jibun Senjō, the spirit of face powder. She walks through the snow during the twelfth month of the lunar calendar, wearing an oversized sugegasa hat.

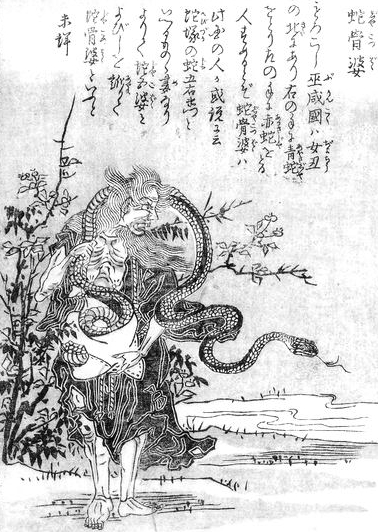
Jakotsubaba (ja:蛇骨婆, snake-bone hag) is an old woman who holds a red snake in her left hand and a blue snake in her right hand. She guards a certain "snake mound", possibly because she is the wife of a monstrous serpent named "Jagoemon" who is sealed there.

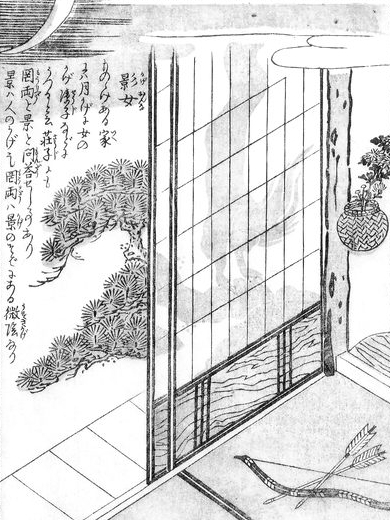
Kage-onna (ja:影女, shadow woman) is a woman's shadow cast by the light of the moon on the paper sliding door of a house where mononoke live.

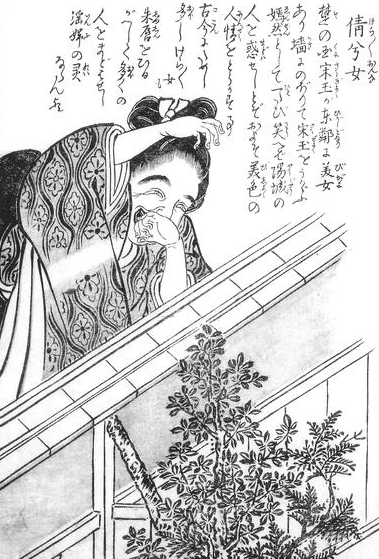
Kerakera-onna (ja:倩兮女)

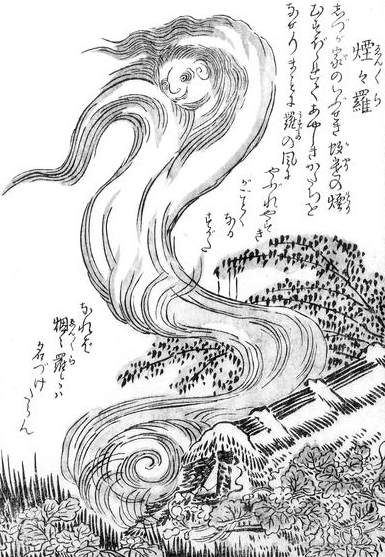
Enenra (烟々羅) is a spirit made of smoke that rises out of a house.

=== Second Volume – Mist ===
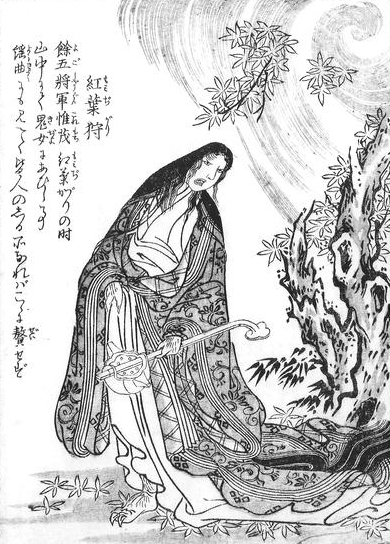
Momiji (紅葉狩) is the demon-woman of Mount Togakushi.

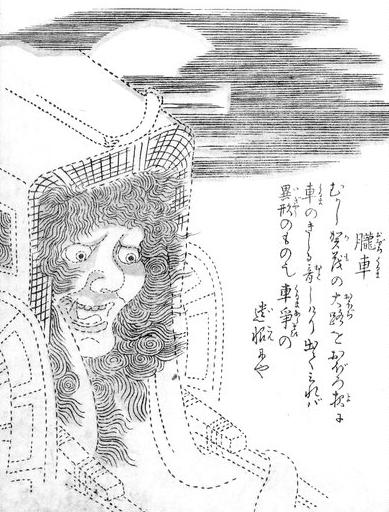
Oboroguruma (ja:朧車) is an ox cart with a huge human face on the front, which appears on hazy moonlit nights in Kyoto.

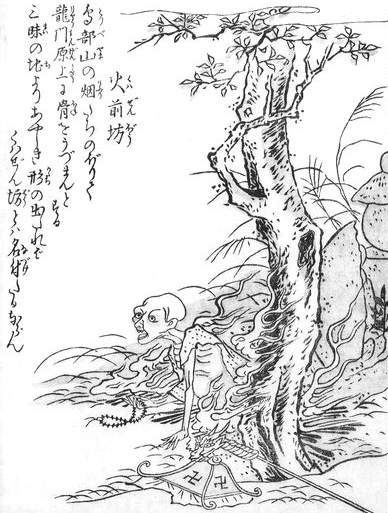
Kazenbō (ja:火前坊) is the ghost of a burned monk that appears on Mount Toribe near Kyoto.

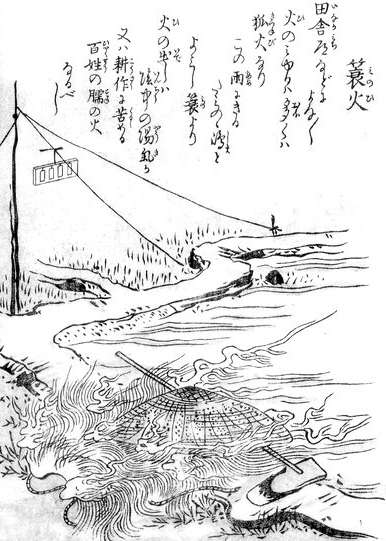
Minobi (ja:蓑火)

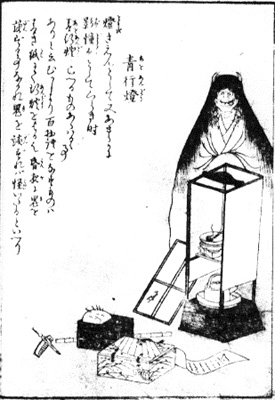
Aoandon (ja:青行燈) The spirit of the blue paper lantern.

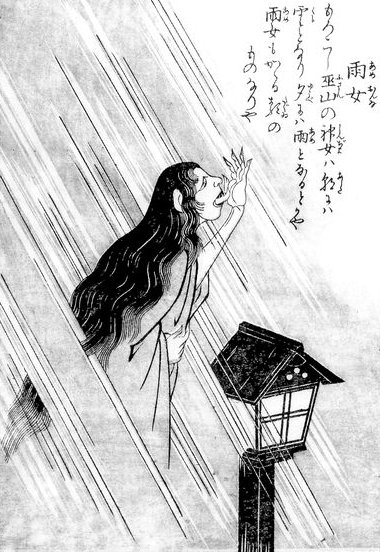
Ameonna (ja:雨女) Rain-making female spirit.

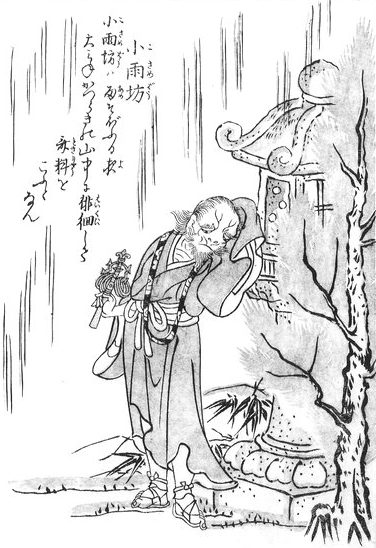
Kosamebō (ja:小雨坊)

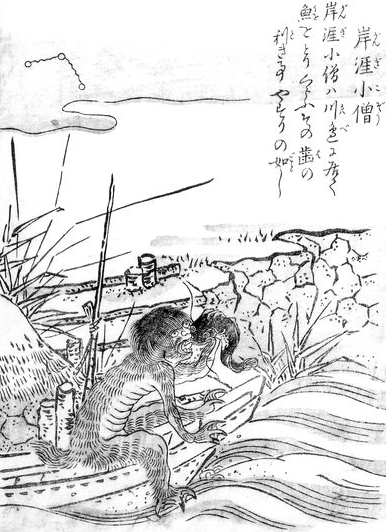
Gangikozō (ja:岸涯小僧)

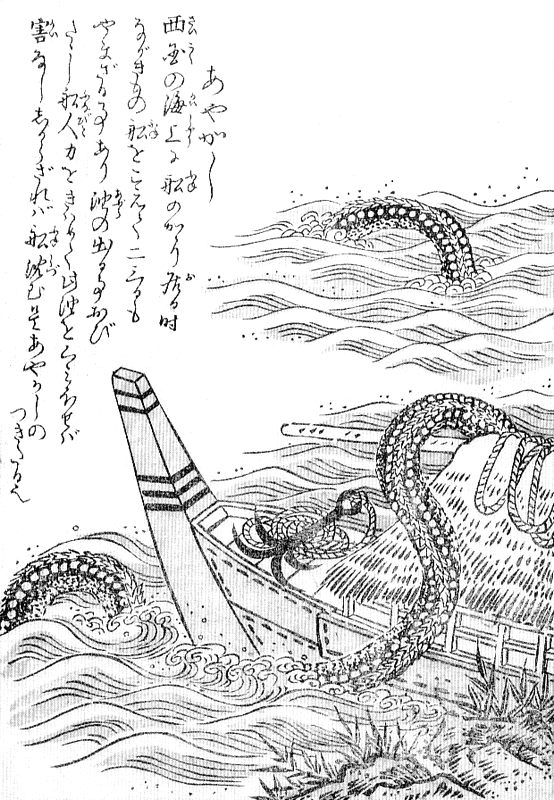
Ayakashi (あやかし)

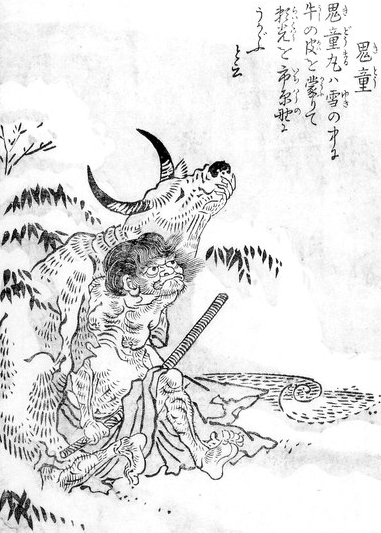
Kidō (鬼童)

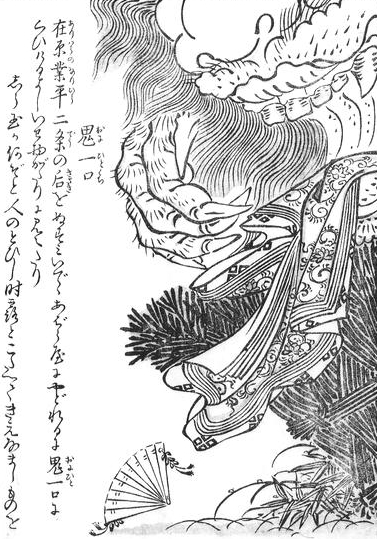
Onihitokuchi (ja:鬼一口)

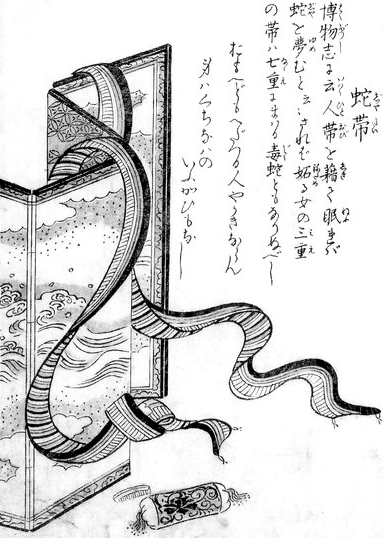
Jatai (ja:蛇帯)

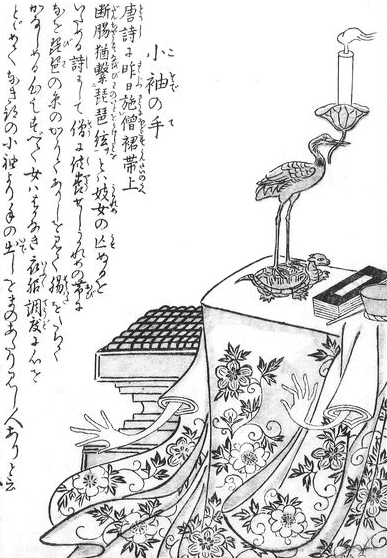
Kosode-no-te (ja:小袖の手)

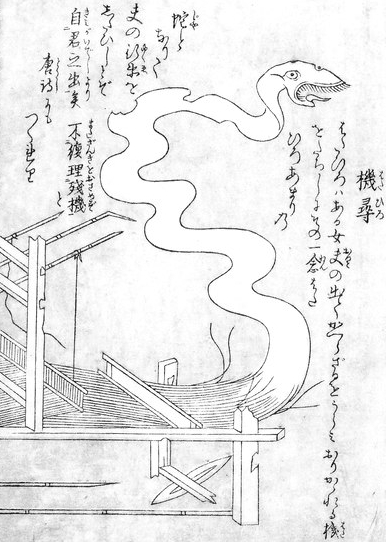
Hatahiro (ja:機尋)

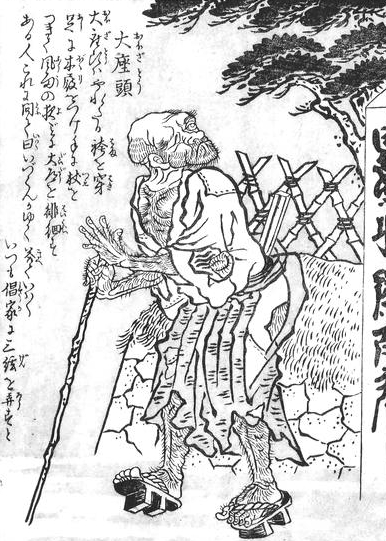
Ōzatō (ja:大座頭)

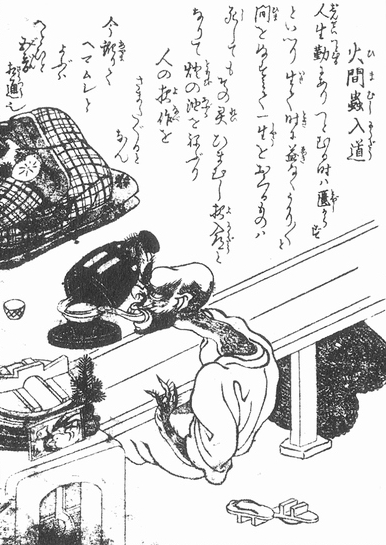
Himamushinyūdō (火間蟲入道)

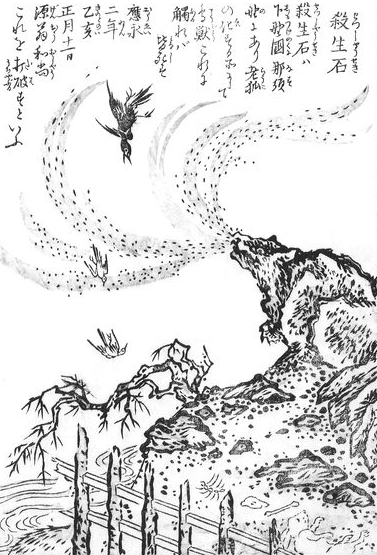
Sesshō-seki (殺生石, killing stone) is a stone in the volcanic mountains near Nasu, Tochigi Prefecture, said to kill anyone who comes into contact with it. It is believed to hold the spirit Tamamo-no-Mae.

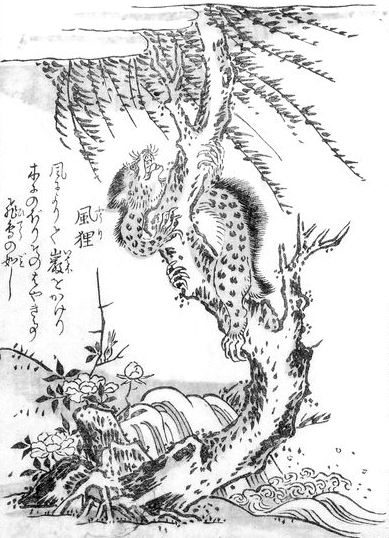
Fūri (風狸, wind tanuki) is a flying creature with the body of a raccoon dog and the fur of a leopard. It originates from China, where it is known as the fengli.

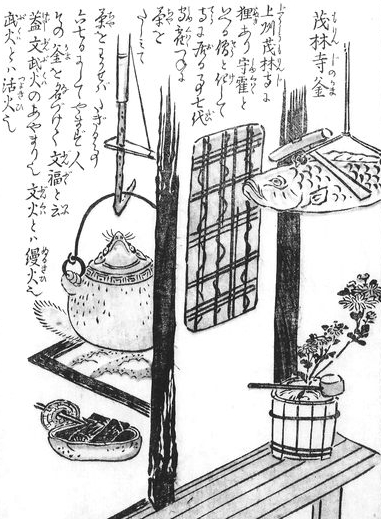
Morinji-no-kama (ja:茂林寺釜)

=== Third Volume – Rain ===
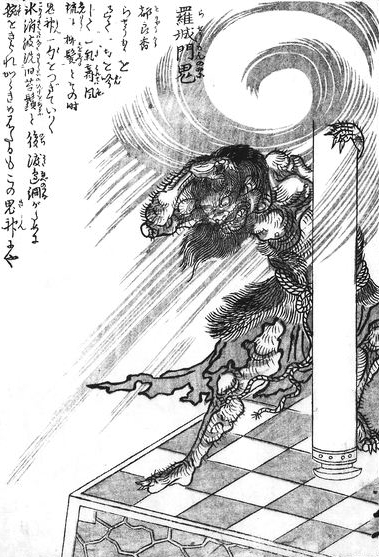
Rashōmon no oni (Oni of Rashōmon, 羅城門鬼)

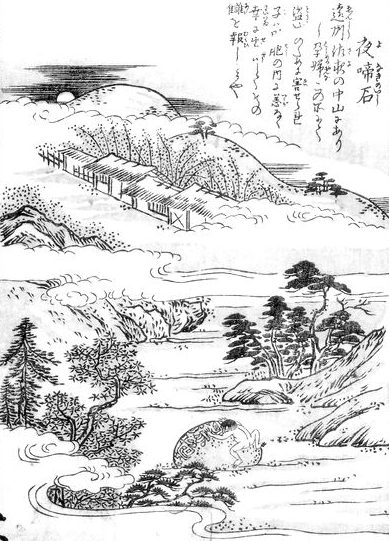
Yonaki ishi (ja:夜泣き石, stone that cries at night) are stones or boulders possessed by spirits that cry loudly at night. The most famous purported Yonaki ishi is located in Kakegawa, Shizuoka Prefecture.

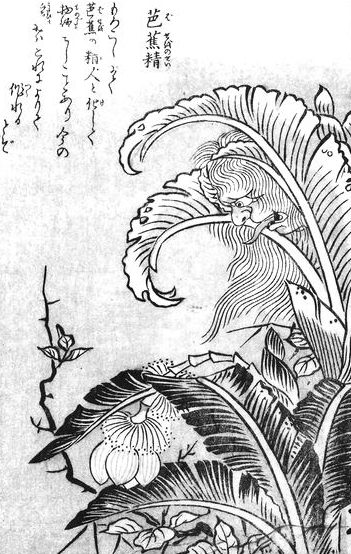
Bashō no sei (ja:芭蕉精, bashō spirit) is the spirit of a bashō that takes on a human form. It is originally described in a Song dynasty text entitled Can heartless plants also attain Buddhahood?, where it is known as the Bajiao Gui.

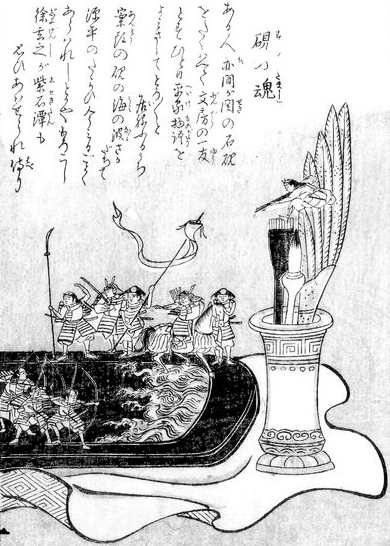
Suzuri-no-tamashii (ja:硯の魂, inkstone soul)

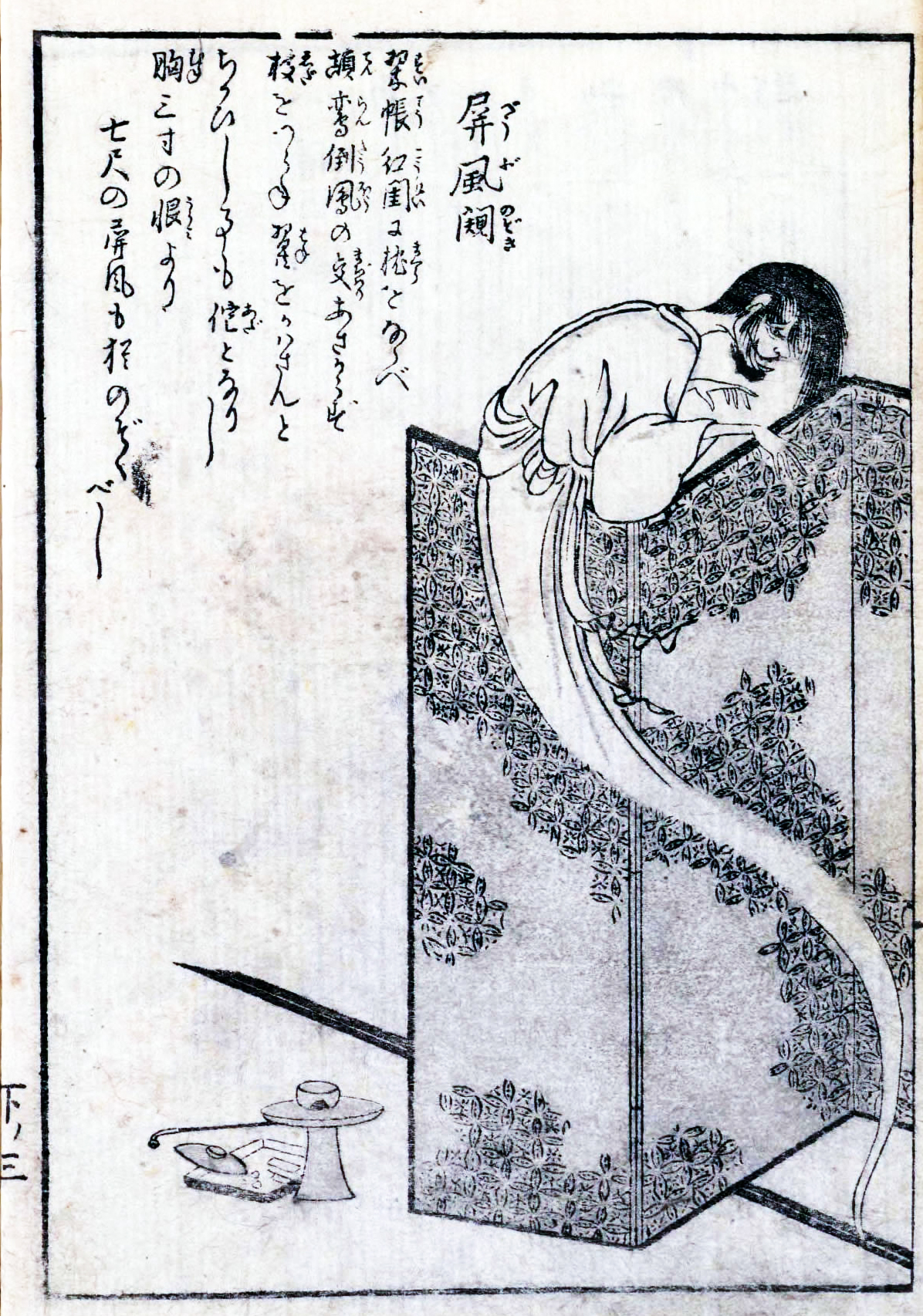
Byōbunozoki (屏風覗)

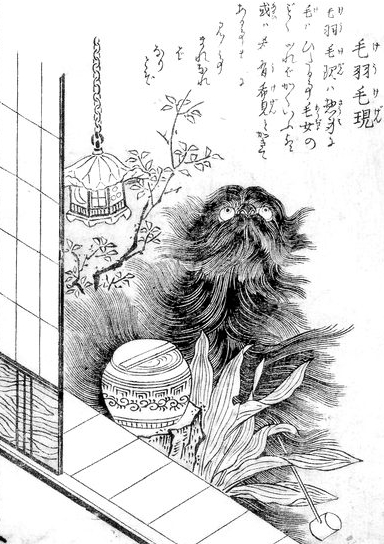
Keukegen (毛羽毛現, fluffy hair appearance) is a small dog-like creature covered entirely in long hair. Sekien connects the Keukegen to Mao Nu, a similarly hairy spirit described in the Liexian Zhuan.

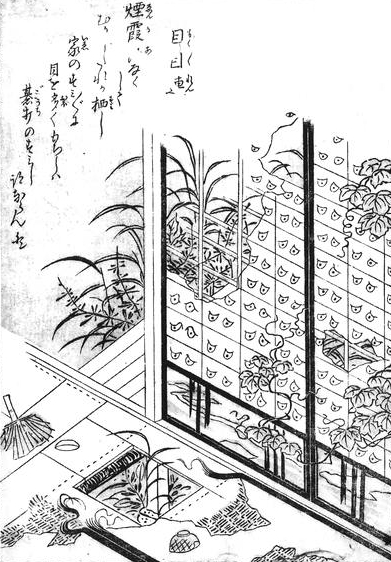
Mokumokuren (目目連, many eyes) are a swarm of eyes that appear on torn shoji in old buildings.

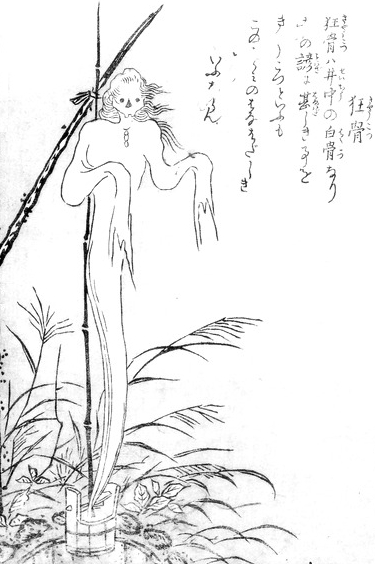
Kyōkotsu (ja:狂骨, crazy bones) is a white-haired, skeletal ghost that appears from the bottom of a well.

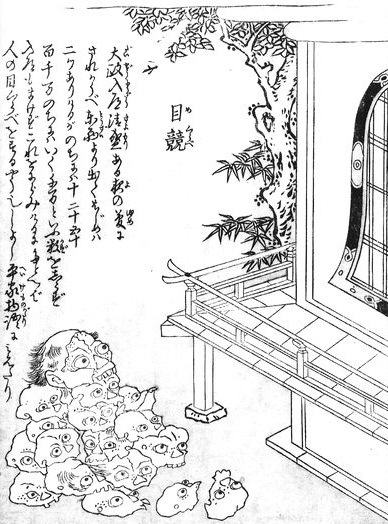
Mekurabe (目競, staring contest) is a pile of multiplying skulls that merges into a single large skull. It originates from The Tale of the Heike, where it menaces Taira no Kiyomori in his courtyard.

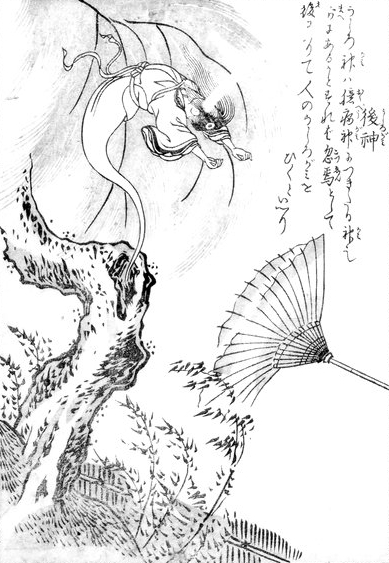
Ushirogami (ja:後神, behind-spirit) is a female spirit with one eye on top of her head. She is said to appear behind people suddenly and pull on their hair.

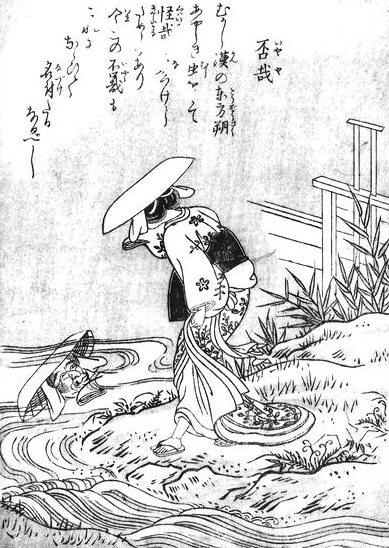
Iyaya (ja:否哉, lit. 'a slang expression meaning 'No way!'') is a female spirit who appears as a beautiful young woman from behind, but has the face of a wrinkly old man when viewed from up front. Sekien connects Iyaya to a Chinese legend about Liu Che and Dongfang Shuo encountering an insect with a human head.

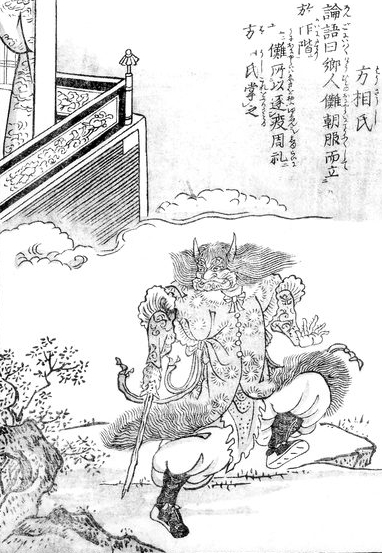
Hōsōshi (方相氏, one who sees in all directions) is a four-eyed, sword-wielding exorcist who leads funeral processions and expels malevolent spirits. He originates from the Chinese Nuo folk religion, where he is known as Fangxiangshi.

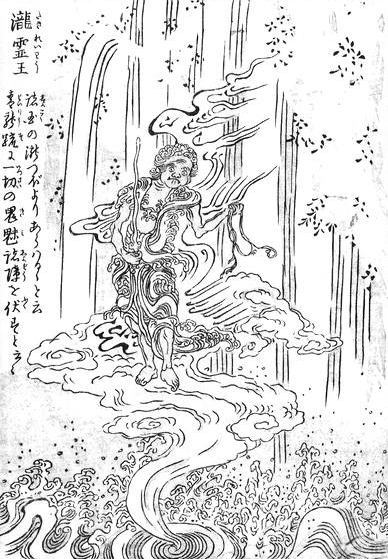
Takirei-ō (ja:滝霊王, waterfall king) is a spirit who appears behind waterfalls, believed to be an immovable Buddha (Fudō Myōō).

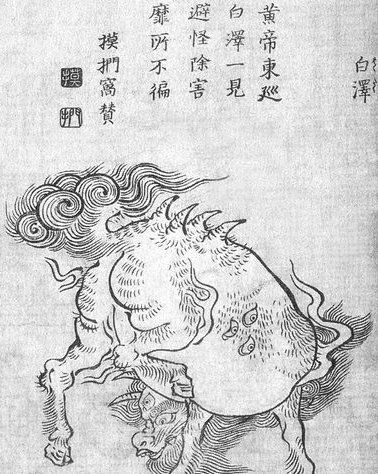
Hakutaku (白澤, white marsh) is a creature that passes down knowledge of harmful spirits, based on the Chinese Bai Ze. In Japan it is typically depicted as a cow or cat creature with a nine-eyed human face.

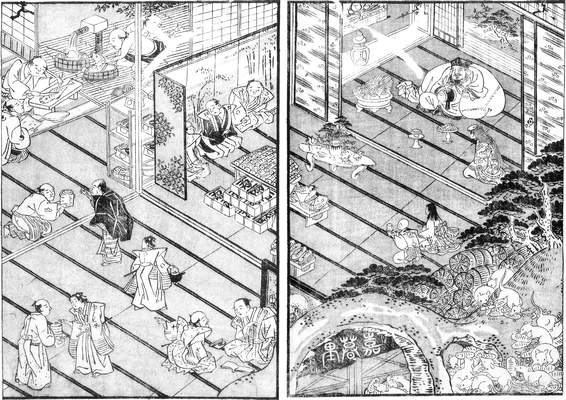
Kakurezato (隠れ里, hidden village) are remote, hidden villages often depicted as utopian refuges.

== See also ==
- Gazu Hyakki Yagyō
- Konjaku Gazu Zoku Hyakki
- Gazu Hyakki Tsurezure Bukuro
