= Oboroguruma =

Supernatural entity in Japanese folklore

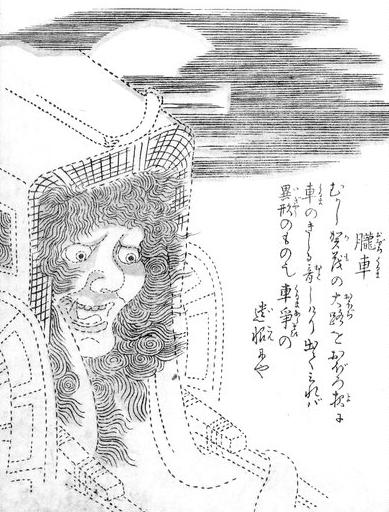
Oboro-guruma from the Konjaku Hyakki Shūi

Oboroguruma (朧車, hazy cart) is a Yōkai in Japanese mythology.

== Mythology ==
The Oboroguruma is a ghostly ox cart with a face on it. Legend has it that on misty nights that are lit by the moon in Kyoto, people can hear squeaking sounds coming from an ox cart. When the person steps outside, they would find the Oboroguruma parked outside their home.

== Popular culture ==
- Different adaptions of Oboroguruma appear in the Super Sentai franchise:
  - In Ninja Sentai Kakuranger, the Oboroguruma is an ox cart that evolved into a taxi cab. In its adaption for the third season of Mighty Morphin Power Rangers, the monster is adapted into "Crabby Cabbie."
  - In Samurai Sentai Shinkenger, the monster Homurakogi is an Oboroguruma-type monster with wheels for hands. In its adaptation Power Rangers Samurai, the monster is adapted into "Sergeant Tread."
  - In Shuriken Sentai Ninninger, the Oboroguruma is an Advanced Yōkai created from two Sealing Shuriken that Masakage brought into contact with six Gashadokuro. In Power Rangers Ninja Steel, the monster is adapted into Megamauler.
- In Nura: Rise of the Yokai Clan, an Oboroguruma lives in the Nura House and is used as a mode of transportation for the Nura family and allies of the Nura family.
- In Yo-kai Watch, the Yo-kai Mayoiguruma is based on the Oboroguruma and is referred to as "No-Go Kart" in the English dub.
- In the Yu-Gi-Oh! Trading Card Game, the cards "Shafu" and "Oboro-Garuma", both otherwise known as "the Wheeled Mayakashi", are based on this spirit. Shafu's effect of returning a monster to the field from the graveyard is a direct reference to the legend.
- In Digimon, a Digimon named Oboromon, based on Oboroguruma, debuted in the Vital Bracelet Digital Monster in 2022.
