= Ameonna =

Yōkai

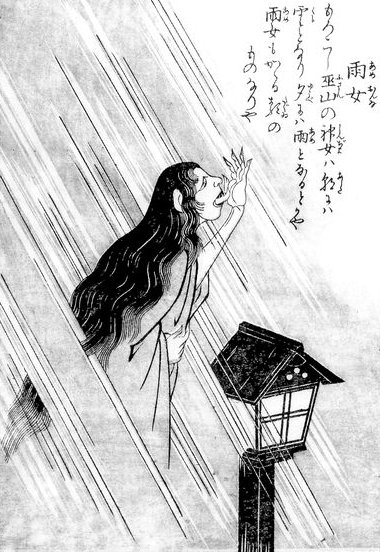
"Ameonna" (雨女) from the Konjaku Hyakki Shūi by Toriyama Sekien

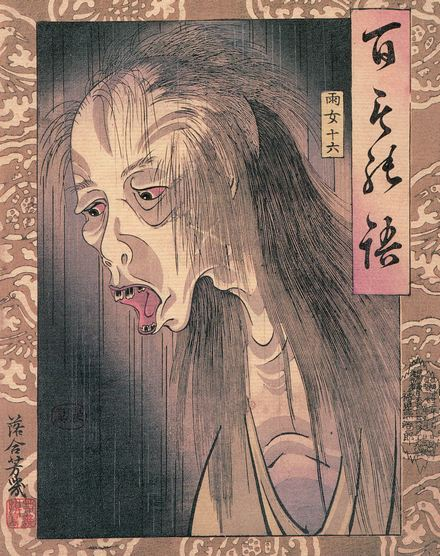
"Hyakumonogatari Ameonna" (百物語 雨女) by Utagawa Yoshiiku

Ameonna (雨(あめ)女(おんな), "rain woman") is a Japanese yōkai thought to call forth rain, illustrated in Toriyama Sekien's Konjaku Hyakki Shūi as a woman standing in the rain and licking her hand.

In modern usage in Japan, "ameonna" (or the male equivalent "ameotoko") refers to an unlucky person that seems to be jinxed to have the rain follow them wherever they may go, thus gaining a reputation for ruining special events such as weddings or sporting events.

== Origins ==
In the collection of yōkai pictures, the Konjaku Hyakki Shūi by Toriyama Sekien, there is a picture titled "ameonna," and the explanatory text says "in Fuzan (Wu Shan), China, the goddesses become a cloud in morning and rain in the evening. The ameonna is probably like one of these" (もろこし巫山の神女は 朝には雲となり 夕には雨となるとかや 雨女もかかる類のものなりや). This quotes from an episode in the Gaotangfu (高唐賦) by the Chu literati Song Yu, wherein King Huai of Chu had a dream about falling in love with a woman in Wu Shan who, before leaving, left the words "I will be clouds in the morning, and rain in the evening, so at morning and evening, let's meet down at the balcony," and 朝雲暮雨 (Chaoyunmuyu in Chinese, Chōunbō in Japanese), written as "morning cloud evening rain", is an old chengyu (Chinese proverb) referring to secret relations between a man and woman. There are no statements about any rain-related yōkai to be seen, so it's been suggested that the ameonna is simply a made-up creation by Sekien in order to satirize the Edo Period Yoshiwara Yūkaku.

There is also the idea put forth that women who lose their recently born children on a day of rain due to a kamikakushi (spiriting away) would become rain women (ameonna), so they would appear before crying children carrying a large sack.

Sometimes, they are considered a "bothersome yōkai that calls forth rain," but they are also sometimes considered a holy "rain god" as a "yōkai who saves people by calling forth rain" in times of continuing drought by making it rain.

In Shimoina District, Nagano Prefecture, there is an eerie woman called "Ameonba" (雨おんば) said to appear on rainy nights, and it has been supposed that they are a yōkai that kidnaps children, or a god that visits on rainy days who has fallen and turned into a yōkai, among other suggestions.

== In popular culture ==
- In the videogames Shadow Warrior (2013) and Shadow Warrior 2, Ameonna is a being of the Shadow Realm whose soul is used to reinforce the Outer Gates preventing the forces of Chaos from entering the Shadow Realm. Her tears, meanwhile, are used to bring rain to the realm, however, both tasks put an immense strain to her, so she's given a potion at intervals to regulate her. She falls in love with one of his brothers, Hoji, and a drought ensues. The ruler of the Shadow Realm, Enra, orders the separation of Hoji and Ameonna, and a defacing punishment for the former. Ameonna accepts her fate, and this pisses off Hoji, who crafts a potion to give Ameonna eternal slumber, with Enra ordering Hoji's exile as a punishment for these actions.
- In Music, Canadian electronic music producer Deadmau5 released a single titled "Ameonna" on 24 October 2025 through his label Mau5trap. The track is in reference to the Japanese rain-bringing spirit after which it is named.
