= Toriyama Sekien =

Japanese artist (1712–1788)

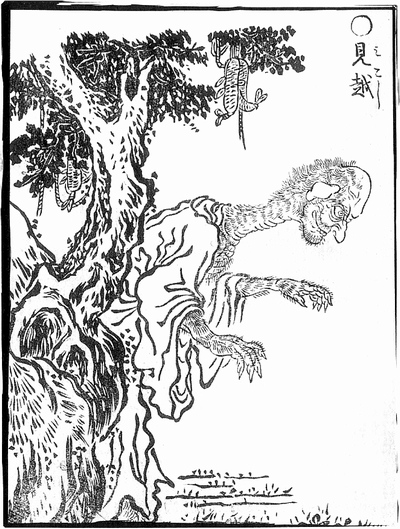
A Mikoshi-nyūdō, specifically a Miage-nyūdō, as portrayed by Toriyama

Toriyama Sekien (鳥山 石燕; 1712 – September 22, 1788), real name Sano Toyofusa (佐野 豊房), was a scholar, kyōka poet, and ukiyo-e artist of Japanese folklore.

== Early life ==
Born to a family of high-ranking servants to the Tokugawa shogunate, Sekien was trained by Kanō school artists Kanō Gyokuen and Kanō Chikanobu, although he was never officially recognized as a Kanō school painter.

== Art career ==
After retiring from service to the shogunate, Sekien became a teacher to numerous apprentices in poetry and painting. He was among the first to apply Kanō techniques to ukiyo-e printmaking, inventing key new techniques along the way, such as fuki-bokashi, which allowed for replicating color gradations. Most famously, he was the teacher of Kitagawa Utamaro and Utagawa Toyoharu. One of the seals used by Toyoharu reads "Toriyama Sekien Toyofusa monjin" ("pupil of Toriyama Sekien Toyofusa"), suggesting that Sekien granted his student permission to incorporate the character "Toyo" from his own personal name, Toyofusa, into his art name.

Sekien is best known for his mass-produced illustrated books of yōkai that had appeared in Hyakki Yagyō monster parade scrolls. The first book proved popular enough to spawn three sequels, the last of which features yōkai mainly out of Sekien's imagination. Although sometimes described as a "demonologist," his work is better described as a literary parody of encyclopedias such as the Japanese Wakan Sansai Zue or the Chinese Classic of Mountains and Seas, which were popular in Japan at the time. His portrayals of these creatures from folklore essentially established their visual portrayals in the public's mind and deeply inspired other Japanese artists in his own and later eras, including ukiyo-e artists Tsukioka Yoshitoshi, Kawanabe Kyōsai, and manga artist Mizuki Shigeru.

== Notable works ==
- Toriyamabiko (鳥山彦; published in 1773)
- Sekien's Picture Album (石燕画譜; published in 1774)
- The Illustrated Demon Horde's Night Parade (画図百鬼夜行; published in 1776)
- The Illustrated Demon Horde from Past and Present, Continued (今昔画図続百鬼; published in 1779)
- More of the Demon Horde from Past and Present (今昔百鬼拾遺; published in 1780)
- Kawataro 河太郎
- Kawako 河腰
- Yamawaro 山和露
- Ushi no koku mairi 牛の国参り
- A Horde of Haunted Housewares (画図百鬼徒然袋; published in 1784)
