= Shabake =

Novel series by Megumi Hatakenaka

- First novel volume cover

しゃばけ
- Genre: Historical fantasy
- Serial novel
- Written by: Megumi Hatakenaka
- Illustrated by: Yū Shibata
- Published by: Shinchosha
- Magazine: Shōsetsu Shinchō; Yom Yom
- Original run: December 1, 2001 – present
- Volumes: 23
- Live-action television film
- Directed by: Reiko Miyamoto
- Produced by: Reiko Kita; Kohei Adaichi
- Written by: Yuko Nagata
- Music by: Yasuharu Takanashi; Hiromi Mizutani
- Studio: Fuji TV
- Original network: FNS (Fuji TV)
- Released: November 24, 2007
- Live-action television film

Shabake: Uso Uso
- Directed by: Michio Mitsuno
- Produced by: Kohei Adaichi
- Written by: Shôgo Kashida; Natsuko Takahashi
- Music by: Yasuharu Takanashi; Hiromi Mizutani
- Studio: Fuji Television
- Original network: FNS (Fuji TV)
- Released: November 29, 2008
- Manga
- Written by: Megumi Hatakenaka
- Illustrated by: Mimori
- Published by: Shinchosha
- Imprint: Bunch Comics
- Magazine: Monthly Comic Bunch
- Original run: January 21, 2017 – March 20, 2023
- Volumes: 4
- Original net animation
- Directed by: Hideki Ito
- Music by: Kaoru Wada
- Studio: Shuka
- Released: July 19, 2021
- Runtime: 3 minutes
- Anime television series
- Directed by: Takahiro Ōkawa
- Written by: Touko Machida
- Music by: Rei Ishizuka
- Studio: BN Pictures
- Licensed by: Crunchyroll; SEA: Medialink
- Original network: FNS (Fuji TV)
- Original run: October 3, 2025 – December 26, 2025
- Episodes: 13

Shabake (しゃばけ) is a Japanese historical fantasy novel series written by Megumi Hatanaka with illustrations by Yū Shibata. It began publication by Shinchosha in December 2001, with 23 volumes being released as of July 2024. A manga adaptation illustrated by Mimori was serialized in Shinchosha's Monthly Comic Bunch magazine from January 2017 to March 2023.

A television film aired on Fuji TV and its affiliates in 2007, followed by a sequel titled in English as Shabake: Uso Uso (うそうそ, Uso Uso) which aired the following year. A 3-minute original net animation (ONA) adaptation produced by Shuka was released in July 2021. An anime television series adaptation of the first novel, that is produced by BN Pictures, aired from October to December 2025 on Fuji TV's Noitamina programming block.

== Characters ==
Ichitarō (一太郎)
Voiced by: Junya Enoki (ONA), Daiki Yamashita (TV series)
Nikichi (仁吉)
Voiced by: Koki Uchiyama (ONA), Kōji Okino (TV series)
Sasuke (佐助)
Voiced by: Yōhei Azakami (ONA), Taku Yashiro (TV series)
Byōbunozoki (屏風のぞき)
Voiced by: Ryohei Kimura (ONA), Daisuke Namikawa (TV series)
Matsunosuke (松之助)
Voiced by: Seiichiro Yamashita (TV series)
Eikichi (栄吉)
Voiced by: Shimba Tsuchiya (TV series)
Oharu (お春)
Voiced by: Shion Wakayama (TV series)
Suzuhiko-hime (鈴彦姫)
Voiced by: Hisako Kanemoto (ONA), Akira Sekine (TV series)
Noderabō (野寺坊)
Voiced by: Shinya Takahashi (TV series)
Kawauso (獺)
Voiced by: Misako Tomioka (TV series)
Yanari (鳴家)
Voiced by: Akane Matsunaga, Aika Wakuno, Takako Tanaka (TV series)

== Media ==
=== Novels ===
No.	Title	Release date	ISBN
1	Shabake (しゃばけ)	December 1, 2001	978-4-10-450701-6
2	Nushi-sama e (ぬしさまへ)	May 20, 2003	978-4-10-450702-3
3	Neko no Baba (ねこのばば)	July 23, 2004	978-4-10-450703-0
4	Omake no Ko (おまけのこ)	August 19, 2005	978-4-10-450704-7
5	Uso Uso (うそうそ)	May 30, 2006	978-4-10-450705-4
6	Chinpunkan (ちんぷんかん)	June 20, 2007	978-4-10-450707-8
7	Ichiban (いっちばん)	July 1, 2008	978-4-10-450709-2
8	Korokororo (ころころろ)	July 30, 2009	978-4-10-450710-8
9	Yundemete (ゆんでめて)	July 1, 2010	978-4-10-450712-2
10	Yanariinari (やなりいなり)	July 29, 2011	978-4-10-450714-6
11	Hinakomachi (ひなこまち)	June 29, 2012	978-4-10-450716-0
12	Tabun Neko (たぶんねこ)	July 22, 2013	978-4-10-450718-4
13	Suezue (すえずえ)	July 31, 2014	978-4-10-450719-1
14	Naritai (なりたい)	July 22, 2015	978-4-10-450720-7
15	Ō Atari (おおあたり)	July 22, 2016	978-4-10-450721-4
16	Toru to Dasu (とるとだす)	July 21, 2017	978-4-10-450723-8
17	Musubitsuki (むすびつき)	July 20, 2018	978-4-10-450725-2
18	Tengentsū (てんげんつう)	July 18, 2019	978-4-10-450726-9
19	Ichinenkan (いちねんかん)	July 17, 2020	978-4-10-450727-6
20	Mōichido (もういちど)	July 19, 2021	978-4-10-450728-3
21	Koigokoro (こいごころ)	July 21, 2022	978-4-10-450729-0
22	Itsumade (いつまで)	July 20, 2023	978-4-10-450730-6
23	Nazotoki (なぞとき)	July 18, 2024	978-4-10-450731-3
24	Ayakashi-tachi (あやかしたち)	September 18, 2025	978-4-10-450732-0

=== Manga ===
A manga adaptation illustrated by Mimori was serialized in Shinchosha's Monthly Comic Bunch magazine from January 21, 2017, to March 20, 2023. The manga's chapters were collected into four tankōbon volumes released from April 9, 2018, to June 8, 2023.

No.	Release date	ISBN
1	April 9, 2018	978-4-10-772063-4
2	July 9, 2019	978-4-10-772198-3
3	July 8, 2021	978-4-10-772403-8
4	June 8, 2023	978-4-10-772608-7

=== Anime ===
A 3-minute original net animation (ONA) adaptation was released on July 19, 2021, to celebrate the novel series' 20th anniversary. The ONA is produced by Shuka and directed by Hideki Ito, with music composed by Kaoru Wada.

An anime television series adaptation was announced on November 25, 2024. It is produced by BN Pictures and directed by Takahiro Ōkawa, with series composition by Touko Machida, character designs by Akari Minagawa, sub-character designs by Yuka Shiga who both also handle chief animation direction and music composed by Rei Ishizuka. The series aired from October 3 to December 26, 2025, on the Noitamina programming block on Fuji TV and its affiliates. The opening theme song is "Inochi no Parade" (いのちのパレヱド; 'Parade of Life'), performed by Kujira, while the ending theme song is "Myaku-Myaku" (脈脈; Continuous), performed by KAFUNÉ. Crunchyroll streamed the series. Medialink licensed the series in Southeast Asia.

==== Episodes ====
No.	Title	Directed by	Written by	Storyboarded by	Original release date
1	"Dark Night"; Transliteration: "Anya" (Japanese: あんや)	Megumi Yamamoto	Touko Machida	Takahiro Ōkawa	October 3, 2025
2	"Melancholy"; Transliteration: "Monōi" (Japanese: ものうい)	Takashi Kojima	Touko Machida	Kunihisa Sugishima	October 10, 2025
3	"Herald"; Transliteration: "Sakibure" (Japanese: さきぶれ)	Kenta Kushitani	Touko Machida	Kenta Kushitani & Takahiro Ōkawa	October 17, 2025
4	"Compatibility"; Transliteration: "Aishō" (Japanese: あいしょう)	Tomo Ōkubo	Touko Machida	Tomo Ōkubo	October 24, 2025
5	"This World of Suffering"; Transliteration: "Kataku" (Japanese: かたく)	Megumi Yamamoto	Touko Machida	Kazutaka Muraki	October 31, 2025
6	"One-sided Feelings"; Transliteration: "Katakoi" (Japanese: かたこい)	Ōri Yasukawa	Touko Machida	Shigeyuki Miya	November 7, 2025
7	"Love"; Transliteration: "Onnai" (Japanese: おんない)	Akira Toba	Rie Yokota	Kunihisa Sugishima	November 14, 2025
8	"Opportunity"; Transliteration: "Ukabuse" (Japanese: うかぶせ)	Takashi Kojima	Touko Machida	Takashi Kojima	November 21, 2025
9	"Acquaintance"; Transliteration: "Yuen" (Japanese: ゆえん)	Kenta Kushiya	Touko Machida	Kenta Kushiya	November 28, 2025
10	"Fact and Fiction"; Transliteration: "Kiyojitsu" (Japanese: きょじつ)	Ōri Yasukawa	Rie Yokota	Ōri Yasukawa	December 5, 2025
11	"Whereabouts"; Transliteration: "Arika" (Japanese: ありか)	Aya Mikami & Kento Nakagome	Touko Machida	Kazutaka Muraki	December 12, 2025
12	"Yearning"; Transliteration: "Shōkei" (Japanese: しょうけい)	Megumi Yamamoto	Rie Yokota	Shigeyuki Miya	December 19, 2025
13	"Happily Ever After"; Transliteration: "Hitome Agari" (Japanese: ひとめあがり)	Akira Toba	Touko Machida	Takahiro Ōkawa	December 26, 2025

== Reception ==
By November 2024, the novels had over 10 million copies in circulation.

== See also ==
- Tsukumogami Kashimasu, another novel series by the same writer
