= GeGeGe no Kitarō (1968 TV series) =

- Based on: GeGeGe no Kitarō by Shigeru Mizuki
- Music by: Taku Izumi
- Country of origin: Japan
- Original language: Japanese
- No. of episodes: 65

Production
- Production company: Toei Animation

Original release
- Network: Fuji TV
- Release: January 3, 1968 – March 30, 1969

The first GeGeGe no Kitarō anime was aired from January 3, 1968, to March 30, 1969. It ran for 65 episodes. Like all of the subsequent Kitarō anime, it was produced by Toei Animation and aired on Fuji Television.

== Cast ==
Character	Voice actor
Kitaro	Masako Nozawa
Medama-Oyaji	Isamu Tanonaka
Nezumi Otoko	Chikao Ohtsuka
Sunakake Baba	Yōko Ogushi
Konaki-Jiji	Yonehiko Kitagawa (episode 7)
Konaki-Jiji	Ichiro Nagai
Konaki-Jiji	Kōsei Tomita (episodes 28 and 29)
Ittan-momen	Kosaku Sugiura (episode 10)
Ittan-momen	Kōsei Tomita (episode 22)
Nurikabe	Yonehiko Kitagawa (episode 10)
Nurikabe	Kosaku Sugiura (episode 29)
Nurikabe	Kenji Utsumi (episode 57)
Nurikabe	Kōsei Tomita (episode 60)
Neko Musume	Nana Yamaguchi
Backbeard	Kōsei Tomita
Nurariyon	Ryūji Saikachi

== Episodes ==
No.	Title	Directed by	Written by	Animation directed by	Art directed by	Original release date
1	"Ghost Nighter"; Transliteration: "Obake Nightaa" (Japanese: おばけナイター)	Yasuo Yamaguchi	Masaki Tsuji	Hiroshi Wagatsuma	Saburō Yokoi	January 3, 1968
A kid named Donpei walked through a graveyard and finds a baseball bat on the ground with some funny writing on it. He swings it for fun and finds that anything he hits always lands where he wants. He becomes famous at school for always hitting home-runs. This bat belongs to a Youkai baseball team and this team asks Kitaro to get the bat back from the humans. Kitaro explains to the human kids they need the bat back but they won't. Kitaro offers a Baseball game at 3am to settle the issue; if the Humans win the Youkai will give up on the bat and if the Youkai win the human kids will have to give up their lives. Donpei's team accepts. The games is canceled before the game finished because the Youkai don't want to be caught in the sun. The issue is settled with the Youkai getting their bat back while the humans keep their lives.
2	"Yaksha"; Transliteration: "Yasha" (Japanese: 夜叉)	Yoshio Kuroda	Susumu Takaku	Teruo Hosoda	Hideo Chiba	January 10, 1968
Yasha is a demon that steals children's souls. It lures children to it by possessing a person and plays hypnotizing music on a guitar. The souls are stored in balloons to be eaten later. Yasha's true form is hair. Kitaro's soul gets stolen as well but his father brings his soul back to him before he is killed. In a fight with Yasha, Kitaro calls for his Youkai Lamp (a fire spirit) and burns Yasha to death. The souls of the children are returned.
3	"Youkai Castle"; Transliteration: "Youkai Jou" (Japanese: 妖怪城)	Tokue Shirane	Motonari Wakai	Masamune Ochiai	Shigeyoshi Endō	January 17, 1968
The seal on a youkai castle is taken off by Nezumi-otoko [Rat-man] and the youkai from the castle requests children from a village to be given to the castle once a month to turn them into youkai. Kitaro happens to be walking by and offers to help. Kitaro asks to borrow one girl to be bait for the bad youkai. Nezumi-otoko comes to get the girl which surprises Kitaro because they know each other. Nezumi-otoko is known to be greedy and not care for anyone other than himself and is only helping the youkai of the castle for fun. The girl gets taken from Kitaro. Kitaro gets in a series of fights with the Youkai of the castle. In the end he is flattened and his chanchanko [his magic vest] is taken by Nezumi-otoko. Kitaro channels his mind into the chanchanko and threatens to suffocate Nezumi-otoko remotely and makes him re-seal the castle. Kitaro becomes un-flattened with help from his father and saves the girl before morning.
4	"Vampire La Seine [?]"; Transliteration: "Kyuuketsuki Ra・Seenu" (Japanese: 吸血鬼ラ・セーヌ)	Yoshio Takami	Shun'ichi Yukimuro	Shinya Takahashi	Shigeyoshi Endō	January 24, 1968
5	"Great Sea Beast"; Transliteration: "Daikaijuu" (Japanese: 大海獣)	Hiroshi Shidara	Masaki Tsuji	Minoru Tajima	Makoto Yamazaki	January 31, 1968
6	"Great Sea Beast"; Transliteration: "Daikaijuu" (Japanese: 大海獣)	Hiroshi Shidara	Masaki Tsuji	Minoru Tajima	Makoto Yamazaki	February 7, 1968
7	"Ghost Train"; Transliteration: "Yūrei densha" (Japanese: ゆうれい電車)	Shizuo Murayama	Michio Suzuki	Yukiyoshi Hane	Makoto Yamazaki	February 14, 1968
8	"Old Man of the Mirror [?]"; Transliteration: "Kagami Jijii" (Japanese: 鏡爺)	Masayuki Akehi	Toyohiro Andō	Hideo Furusawa	Makoto Yamazaki	February 21, 1968
9	"The Look-up Priest [?]"; Transliteration: "Miage-nyūdō" (Japanese: 見上げ入道)	Tokue Shirane	Shun'ichi Yukimuro	Masamune Ochiai	Hideo Chiba	February 28, 1968
10	"Great Youkai War"; Transliteration: "Yōkai daisensō" (Japanese: 妖怪大戦争)	Kazukiyo Shigeno	Shun'ichi Yukimuro	Akinori Ōrai	Hideo Chiba	March 6, 1968
11	"Great Youkai War"; Transliteration: "Yōkai daisensō" (Japanese: 妖怪大戦争)	Kazukiyo Shigeno	Shun'ichi Yukimuro	Akinori Ōrai	Hideo Chiba	March 13, 1968
12	"The Youkai Nurarihyon"; Transliteration: "Yōkai Nurarihyon" (Japanese: 妖怪ぬらりひょん)	Nobutaka Nishizawa	Toyohiro Andō	Shinya Takahashi	Saburō Yokoi	March 20, 1968
13	"Hell Cruise"; Transliteration: "Jigoku nagashi" (Japanese: 地獄流し)	Takashi Hisaoka	Michio Suzuki	Hiroshi Wagatsuma	Shigeyoshi Endō	March 27, 1968
14	"Water Tiger"; Transliteration: "Suiko" (Japanese: 水虎)	Shizuo Murayama	Susumu Takaku	Hideo Furusawa	Saburō Yokoi	April 7, 1968
15	"Vampire Elite"; Transliteration: "Kyūketsuki eriito" (Japanese: 吸血鬼エリート)	Yoshio Kuroda	Michio Suzuki	Shinya Takahashi	Shigeyoshi Endō	April 14, 1968
16	"Vampire Elite"; Transliteration: "Kyūketsuki eriito" (Japanese: 吸血鬼エリート)	Yoshio Kuroda	Michio Suzuki	Shinya Takahashi	Shigeyoshi Endō	April 21, 1968
17	"Cat Hermit"; Transliteration: "Neko sennin" (Japanese: 猫仙人)	Yasuo Yamaguchi	Shun'ichi Yukimuro	Hiroshi Wagatsuma	Saburō Yokoi	April 28, 1968
18	"Witch Doll"; Transliteration: "Majo ningyō" (Japanese: 魔女人形)	Shizuo Murayama	Toyohiro Andō	Masamune Ochiai	Makoto Yamazaki	May 5, 1968
19	"Blood Sucking Tree"; Transliteration: "Kyūketsu ki" (Japanese: 吸血木)	Tokue Shirane	Masaki Tsuji	Masamune Ochiai	Shigeyoshi Endō	May 12, 1968
20	"Cat-girl and Rat-man"; Transliteration: "Neko musume to nezumi otoko" (Japanese: 猫娘とねずみ男)	Yoshio Takami	Shun'ichi Yukimuro	Hideo Furusawa	Hideo Chiba	May 19, 1968
21	"Youkai Beast"; Transliteration: "Yōkai-jū" (Japanese: 妖怪獣)	Masayuki Akehi	Susumu Takaku	Teruo Hosoda	Hideo Chiba	May 26, 1968
22	"Youkai Beast"; Transliteration: "Yōkai-jū" (Japanese: 妖怪獣)	Masayuki Akehi	Susumu Takaku	Teruo Hosoda	Hideo Chiba	June 2, 1968
23	"Youkai of the Pass"; Transliteration: "Tōge no yōkai" (Japanese: 峠の妖怪)	Tokue Shirane	Masaki Tsuji	Masamune Ochiai	Shigeyoshi Endō	June 9, 1968
24	"Hakusanbo"; Transliteration: "Hakusanbō" (Japanese: 白山坊)	Takashi Hisaoka	Shun'ichi Yukimuro	Hideo Furusawa	Saburō Yokoi	June 16, 1968
25	"Electric Youkai"; Transliteration: "Denki yōkai" (Japanese: 電気妖怪)	Yoshio Takami	Toyohiro Andō	Teruo Hosoda	Hideo Chiba	June 23, 1968
26	"Boss of the Sea"; Transliteration: "Umi zatō" (Japanese: 海座頭)	Shizuo Murayama	Michio Suzuki	Akinori Ōrai	Hideo Chiba	June 30, 1968
27	"Creepy Mane"; Transliteration: "Odoro-odoro" (Japanese: おどろおどろ)	Tokue Shirane	Michio Suzuki	Masamune Ochiai	Hideo Chiba	July 7, 1968
28	"The Pillow Switcher"; Transliteration: "Makura-gaeshi" (Japanese: まくら返し)	Shizuo Murayama	Masaki Tsuji	Yoshitsugu Nabeshima	Hideo Chiba	July 14, 1968
29	"Mirror Battle [?]"; Transliteration: "Kagami kassen" (Japanese: 鏡合戦)	Nobutaka Nishizawa	Shun'ichi Yukimuro	Akinori Ōrai	Hideo Chiba	July 21, 1968
30	"Devil Belial"; Transliteration: "Akuma beriaru" (Japanese: 悪魔ベリアル)	Shizuo Murayama	Michio Suzuki	Masamune Ochiai	Hideo Chiba	July 28, 1968
31	"Moryo"; Transliteration: "Mōryō" (Japanese: もうりょう)	Fusahiro Nagaki	Toyohiro Andō	Hiroshi Wagatsuma	Hideo Chiba	August 4, 1968
32	"Youkai Flower"; Transliteration: "Yōka" (Japanese: 妖花)	Tokue Shirane	Masaki Tsuji	Tsuguyuki Kubo	Hideo Chiba	August 11, 1968
33	"Turban Shell Demon"; Transliteration: "Sazae-oni" (Japanese: さざえ鬼)	Hideo Furusawa	Shun'ichi Yukimuro	Jōji Kikuchi	Hideo Chiba	August 18, 1968
34	"Plate Boy"; Transliteration: "Sara-kozō" (Japanese: さら小僧)	Takashi Hisaoka	Masaki Tsuji	Teruo Hosoda	Saburō Yokoi	August 25, 1968
35	"Top Youkai"; Transliteration: "Koma Yōkai" (Japanese: こま妖怪)	Tokue Shirane	Michio Suzuki	Masamune Ochiai	Hidenobu Hata	September 1, 1968
36	"Diamond Youkai"; Transliteration: "Daiyamondo yōkai" (Japanese: ダイヤモンド妖怪)	Masayuki Akehi	Toyohiro Andō	Hiroshi Wagatsuma	Hideo Chiba	September 8, 1968
37	"Eyes on Hand"; Transliteration: "Tenome" (Japanese: 手の目)	Shizuo Murayama	Toyohiro Andō	Masamune Ochiai	Tadami Shimokawa	September 15, 1968
38	"Folding Monk"; Transliteration: "Oritatami-nyūdō" (Japanese: おりたたみ入道)	Hideo Furusawa	Shun'ichi Yukimuro	Fumio Eto	Saburō Yokoi	September 22, 1968
39	"Youkai Corps"; Transliteration: "Yōkai Gundan" (Japanese: 妖怪軍団)	Hiroshi Shidara	Michio Suzuki	Akinori Ōrai	Saburō Yokoi	September 29, 1968
40	"Youkai of Obebe Swamp"; Transliteration: "Obebe-numa no Yōkai" (Japanese: おベベ沼の妖怪)	Tokue Shirane	Michio Suzuki	Masamune Ochiai	Tadami Shimokawa	October 6, 1968
41	"Cat Ghoul"; Transliteration: "Bakeneko" (Japanese: ばけ猫)	Kazukiyo Shigeno	Michio Suzuki	Fumio Eto	Hidenobu Hata	October 13, 1968
42	"The Man Eating Island"; Transliteration: "Hitogui-jima" (Japanese: 人食い島)	Masayuki Akehi	Shun'ichi Yukimuro	Hiroshi Wagatsuma	Saburō Yokoi	October 20, 1968
43	"God of Drought"; Transliteration: "Hiderigami" (Japanese: ひでりがみ)	Yasuo Yamaguchi	Toyohiro Andō	Akinori Ōrai	Saburō Yokoi	October 27, 1968
44	"Sandal Battle"; Transliteration: "Geta Kassen" (Japanese: げた合戦)	Tokue Shirane	Shun'ichi Yukimuro	Masamune Ochiai	Saburō Yokoi	November 3, 1968
45	"The No Face"; Transliteration: "Noppera-bō" (Japanese: のっぺらぼう)	Hideo Furusawa	Shun'ichi Yukimuro	Fumio Eto	Saburō Yokoi	November 10, 1968
46	"Birthing Woman Ghost"; Transliteration: "Ubume" (Japanese: うぶめ)	Takashi Hisaoka	Toyohiro Andō	Teruo Hosoda	Shigeyoshi Endō	November 17, 1968
47	"Amanojaku"; Transliteration: "Amanojaku" (Japanese: 天邪鬼)	Tomoharu Katsumata	Shun'ichi Yukimuro	Masamune Ochiai	Hidenobu Hata	November 24, 1968
48	"Snow Woman"; Transliteration: "Yukin-ko" (Japanese: 雪ん子)	Masayuki Akehi	Masaki Tsuji	Hiroshi Wagatsuma	Hidenobu Hata	December 1, 1968
49	"Tenko"; Transliteration: "Tenko [?]" (Japanese: 天狐)	Kazuya Miyazaki	Toyohiro Andō	Jōji Kikuchi	Saburō Yokoi	December 8, 1968
50	"Youkai Sekigahara"; Transliteration: "Yōkai Sekigahara" (Japanese: 妖怪関ケ原)	Yoshikata Nitta	Masaki Tsuji	Akinori Ōrai	Hidenobu Hata	December 15, 1968
51	"Mine Shaft Monk"; Transliteration: "Anagura-nyūdō" (Japanese: 穴ぐら入道)	Yasuo Yamaguchi	Michio Suzuki	Hiroshi Wagatsuma	Saburō Yokoi	December 22, 1968
52	"Vampire Youkai Corps"; Transliteration: "Kyūketsu Yōkai-dan" (Japanese: 吸血妖怪団)	Yoshio Takami	Toyohiro Andō	Seishi Hayashi	Tadami Shimokawa	December 29, 1968
53	"Youkai President"; Transliteration: "Yōkai Daitōryō" (Japanese: 妖怪大統領)	Yasuo Yamaguchi	Hiroshi Ozawa	Teruo Hosoda	Masahiro Ioka	January 5, 1969
54	"Youkai Rally"; Transliteration: "Yōkai Rarii" (Japanese: 妖怪ラリー)	Tomoharu Katsumata	Shun'ichi Yukimuro	Masamune Ochiai	Hidenobu Hata	January 12, 1969
55	"Youkai Fuzzy Hair"; Transliteration: "Yōkai Keukegen" (Japanese: 妖怪毛羽毛現)	Nobutaka Nishizawa	Masaki Tsuji	Minoru Tajima	Hidenobu Hata	January 19, 1969
56	"Seashore Woman"; Transliteration: "Iso-onna" (Japanese: 磯女)	Hideo Furusawa	Hiroshi Ozawa	Shinnosuke Kon	Tadami Shimokawa	January 26, 1969
57	"Invisible Magic"; Transliteration: "Ongyō Mahō" (Japanese: 隠形魔法)	Hiroshi Shidara	Shun'ichi Yukimuro	Akinori Ōrai	Masahiro Ioka	February 2, 1969
58	"Hazy Cart"; Transliteration: "Oboro-guruma" (Japanese: おぼろぐるま)	Tomoharu Katsumata	Masaki Tsuji	Masamune Ochiai	Hidenobu Hata	February 9, 1969
59	"Daruma"; Transliteration: "Daruma" (Japanese: だるま)	Kazuya Miyazaki	Shun'ichi Yukimuro	Toshiyasu Okada	Tadami Shimokawa	February 16, 1969
60	"The Hat Guardian"; Transliteration: "Kasa Jizō" (Japanese: 笠地蔵)	Masayuki Akehi	Shun'ichi Yukimuro	Seishi Hayashi	Masahiro Ioka	February 23, 1969
61	"The Abrupt God"; Transliteration: "Ushirogami" (Japanese: 後神)	Hideo Furusawa	Hiroshi Ozawa	Yoshitsugu Nabeshima	Tadami Shimokawa	March 2, 1969
62	"Old Man Sea"; Transliteration: "Umijijii" (Japanese: 海じじい)	Isao Takahata	Shun'ichi Yukimuro	Masamune Ochiai	Hidenobu Hata	March 9, 1969
63	"Namahage"; Transliteration: "Namahage" (Japanese: なまはげ)	Nobutaka Nishizawa	Masaki Tsuji	Toshiyasu Okada	Tadami Shimokawa	March 16, 1969
64	"Reincarnated Demon"; Transliteration: "Onmoraki" (Japanese: 陰摩羅鬼)	Kazuya Miyazaki	Shun'ichi Yukimuro	Fumio Eto	Hidenobu Hata	March 23, 1969
65	"Youkai Apprentice"; Transliteration: "Yōkai Hōkō" (Japanese: 妖怪ほうこう)	Tomoharu Katsumata	Michio Suzuki	Hiroshi Wagatsuma	Hidenobu Hata	March 30, 1969
