= List of Kakuriyo: Bed & Breakfast for Spirits characters =

This is a list of characters for the light novel and anime series Kakuriyo: Bed & Breakfast for Spirits.

== Main characters ==
Aoi Tsubaki (津場木 葵, Tsubaki Aoi)
Voiced by: Nao Tōyama (Japanese); Emily Neves (English)
A human girl who inherited the ability to see Ayakashi from her grandfather, Shiro, who also taught her how to cook from a young age. She has a caring personality but has shown she can be stubborn and brave, preferring to work to pay her grandfather's debts rather than marry Odanna. Her greatest regret is that she was unable to share a final home cooked meal with her grandfather and that his last meal was instead poor-quality hospital food. She eventually warms up to Odanna and lives in the hidden realm permanently as the chef of Moonflower, a restaurant she took over from Ginji.
Ōdanna (大旦那)
Voiced by: Katsuyuki Konishi (Japanese); Christopher Wehkamp (English)
An Ogre who runs the inn Tenjin-ya in the Hidden Realm. He is known to be cold and merciless but is also loved and respected by his servants because of his kindness and large heart. He knew Shiro, Aoi's grandfather, for many years and considered him a friend. As a result of Shiro owing him almost 100-million-yen, Odanna accepted Shiro's offer of marriage to Aoi as payment. Other Ayakashi refer to him as either "Ogre God" or "Master Innkeeper". He is very affectionate of Aoi to the point that he disguised himself and snuck into Orio-ya to accompany her. Like Shiro, he is able to travel to and from the apparent realm and is also the one who takes Aoi to the hidden realm in the beginning. Later it is revealed that his real name is Setsu (刹).
Ginji (銀次)
Voiced by: Shun'ichi Toki, Miyu Tomita (Childhood) (Japanese); Stephen Fu (English)
A Nine-tailed fox Ayakashi who was the first in the Hidden Realm to show Aoi real kindness. He can shapeshift into any of nine physical appearances including a handsome man, a young boy, a beautiful woman and a baby fox with nine tails. He runs a small restaurant, Moonflower, in Tenjin-ya's annex building but does not receive many customers. He asks Aoi to take over the restaurant after tasting her human style food. He has a closer relationship with Odanna than the other servants, close enough that he is able to use his little boy form to trick Odanna into buying him treats. He is childhood friends with Ranmaru and used to work at Orio-ya, but left after disapproving of Ranmaru bossing their staff around. They gradually reconcile as they and Aoi prepare for the ceremony.

== Tenjin-ya staff ==
Oryō (お涼)
Voiced by: Ai Kakuma (Japanese); Morgan Garrett (English)
A Yuki-onna (Snow Woman) who works as a guest room attendant and appears to function as the head maid in training. Out of jealousy, she initially considered Aoi an unfit bride for Odanna; she further considered it her duty to prevent Aoi's marriage to Odanna. She is in love with Odanna and has been known to call herself his mistress. After disgracing herself trying to get Aoi killed, she falls ill with a fever and her unpopularity with the other servants is revealed when Aoi is the only one willing to look after her. Following this she becomes closer to Aoi and treats her like a friend. She appears to have a previous rivalry with Nene from Orio-ya, possibly because both of them are the hostesses of their respective inns.
Akatsuki (暁)
Voiced by: Yuma Uchida (Japanese); Orion Pitts (English)
Tenjin-ya's front desk clerk and a Tsuchigumo known for his rough and meddlesome behavior. His Ayakashi form is a giant purple spider with thick legs and red eyes. He has a younger sister named Suzuran in which he used to attack humans to keep her safe when they lived in the Human Realm until he was eventually defeated by Shiro and brought to live in his home. He claims to hate Shiro but had actually grown close to him by the time Shiro sent him to Tenjin-ya. He considered this Shiro breaking his promise to look after him and his sister and started resenting him for it. Initially after meeting Aoi, he was quite hostile to her, but after she helps his sister move to the Human Realm, he has become quite mild and even helped Aoi with the opening of Moonflower.
Byakuya (白夜)
Voiced by: Atsushi Tamaru (Japanese); Matt Shipman (English)
A wise and strict Hakutaku in charge of Tenjin-ya's finances. At first, as Aoi makes no profits running Moonflower, he recommends that she gives up and marry Odanna. He says he hated Shiro with a passion because not only did he owe Odanna 100 million yen; he also cost Tenjin-ya enormous amounts of money over the years on broken furniture, unpaid bills and the theft of food and alcohol from the kitchen. However, the truth is Shiro had discovered Byakuya's secret love for Tube Kittens and had used it to blackmail him.
Shizuna (静奈)
Voiced by: Reina Ueda (Japanese); Natalie Hoover (English)
A shy Nure-onna at Tenjin-ya who helps run the bath house. Before working at Tenjin-ya she worked at Orio-ya and was trained by Tokihiko who she grew close to. By accident she was responsible for the scar on Tokihiko's face and was sent away from Orio-ya to work at Tenjin-ya. Though she still cares for Tokihiko, the prolonged separation from him means she now becomes flustered in his presence, causing her to avoid him. Thanks to Aoi's intervention, she eventually reconciled with Tokihiko who promises to one day bring her back to Orio-ya with him.
Kasuga (春日)
Voiced by: Mitsuki Nakae (Japanese); Amanda Lee (English)
A young female Tanuki with the appearance of a young girl with red hair and animal ears. Her role at Tenjin-ya has not been explained though she does have a brother, Chiaki, who works at Tenjin-ya as a shoe caretaker.
Sasuke (サスケ)
Voiced by: Yuuki Inoue (Japanese); Justin Briner (English)
A Kamaitachi whose family has worked at Tenjin-ya for many generations, performing gardening duties during the day and acting as security guards during the night. Sasuke was friends with Shiro in his youth during a rebellious phase when he resented having to work at Tenjin-ya and they frequently got into trouble together.
Chiaki (千秋)
Voiced by: Takuya Eguchi (Japanese); Kyle Igneczi (English)
Kasuga's brother and also a Tanuki. He works at Tenjin-ya as the shoe caretaker.
Saraku (砂楽)
Voiced by: Tomokazu Seki
A scientist who is the Director of Development at Tenjin-ya and oversees the various operations in Tenjin-ya's basement producing the various gifts, products and other items available at the Tenjin-ya giftshop. He has a staff of several hundred Tesso and appears to have trouble focusing on more than one thing at a time as he seemed to forget Aoi and Akatsuki were there while he was creating a recipe for a new kind of steamed bun.
Ai (アイ)
Voiced by: Aya Suzaki (Japanese); Emily Neves (English)
Ai is Aoi's follower, born from Ogre Fire which, if given enough spiritual energy, takes on intelligence and a human appearance. She was born from a combination of Aoi's spiritual energy and the Ogre Fire necklace Odanna gave her. She becomes a copy of Aoi so no one would notice the real Aoi was missing. As a result, Ai's favorite form is a clone of Aoi albeit with green hair, skin and eyes the same color as Odanna's fire. She is loyal and loving to both Aoi and Odanna, in particular treating Aoi like her mother, leading Odanna to joke that Ai is like their daughter.

== Orio-ya staff ==
Ōgon Dōji (黄金童子)
Voiced by: Aoi Yūki (Japanese); Jill Harris (English)
A blonde Zashiki-warashi who, while mysterious at first, is revealed to be the founder of both Tenjin-ya and Orio-ya. She acts as the Mistress Innkeeper of Orio-ya, just as Odanna is Master Innkeeper of Tenjin-ya, though she still has a certain level of authority over the goings on at Tenjin-ya, enough that she can give Odanna orders and expect him to follow them. She was drawn to Aoi by the smell of her food and enjoyed it enough she gifted her a Temari, thus blessing Moonflower with prosperity and saving it from being closed down. Despite this she has shown a colder attitude at times, having kidnapped Aoi from Tenjin-ya and didn't care how the staff of Orio-ya treated her. In truth, she just wanted Aoi's help in preparing for the ceremony to restore peace in the Hidden Realm.
Ranmaru (乱丸)
Voiced by: Kaito Ishikawa, Riho Sugiyama (Childhood) (Japanese); Daman Mills (English)
A Komainu, also known as a Dog God and Young Master of Orio-ya, the counterpart to Ginji's position at Tenjin-ya. He treats Aoi harshly because he knew her grandfather, Shiro, and hated him, enough that he stole the hairpin Odanna gave Aoi to lessen the chance she would try to run away, has banned her from using the main kitchen and only agreed to let her cook in a disused outbuilding because her cooking skills were useful. Despite this he is shown to care deeply for the people of the Southern Land and tries his hardest every day to try and alleviate their suffering, even employing orphans at Orio-ya to prevent them becoming homeless or penniless.
Hatori (葉鳥)
Voiced by: Takuma Terashima (Japanese); Ricco Fajardo (English)
A Tengu, formerly of Mt. Shumon, and the third son of Matsuba the tengu elder and his heron wife, Sasara. He now works at Orio-ya as the Front Desk Manager. Previous to this, he had been the Front Desk Manager at Tenjin-ya until he appointed Akatsuki as his replacement and began working at Orio-ya instead. His father, Matsuba, exiled him from Mt. Shumon after they had a serious fight that ended with Hatori stealing Tengu secret liquor as revenge. He reconciles with his father after Aoi cooks for them the gameni that tore their family apart. Despite being a member of the Orio-ya, Hatori considers Aoi a friend and supports her in several ways after she gets taken to Orio-ya.
Tokihiko (時彦)
Voiced by: Daisuke Hirakawa (Japanese); Brandon Potter (English)
Tokihiko is a Shiranui who works at Orio-ya as a bath attendant. His most notable feature is a scar on his forehead that continually leaks blue flames. He received the scar while saving Shizuna from a dangerous Ayakashi spirit she disturbed while searching for a new hot spring. Tokihiko is in love with Shizuna and has promised to bring her back to Orio-ya one day. He is also good friends with Aoi as she helped him reconcile with Shizuna after so long spent apart.
Hideyoshi (秀吉)
Voiced by: Tetsuya Kakihara (Japanese); Dallas Reid (English)
Hideyoshi is a shapeshifting monkey type Ayakashi who took over Ginji's role as Young Master of Orio-ya after Ginji went to work at Tenjin-ya. He looks down on humans and objects to Aoi's presence at Orio-ya, also quick to blame her for anything that goes wrong. However, he has been on better terms with Aoi especially after she helped take care of Nene when she was feeling down. He has a secret crush on Nene, but doesn't reveal his feelings out of wanting to support her with her love for Ranmaru.
Nene (ねね)
Voiced by: Sayaka Kaneko (Japanese); Felecia Angelle (English)
Nene is a Fire Rat Ayakashi notable for her bright pink hair, red eyes and pink flames she can summon at will. She serves as Orio-ya's Young Hostess and is irritated by Aoi's presence, believing her to be a nuisance, and took part in an incident that injured Aoi's ankle. She may also have been behind other cruel pranks played on Aoi though this is never proven. When she is depressed or exhausted she reverts to her Ayakashi form, a small pink rat with large ears and a fluffy tail. In this form her temperature runs so hot Aoi burned her fingers trying to pick her up. She has a rivalry with Oryo, possibly because Oryo's cryokinesis clashes with her pyrokinesis, but has revealed she hold a lot of admiration towards the snow woman thanks to her saving Nene from a drunkard when she was a child. Although she bullied Aoi at first, she became better friends with her especially after Aoi took care of her when she was feeling down and listened to her complaints. She has a crush on Ranmaru.
Kai & Mei (戒・明)
Voiced by: Minori Suzuki (Japanese); Morgan Berry (Kai), Mikaela Krantz (Mei) (English)
Kai and Mei are Black and White Crane twin sisters working at Orio-ya as chefs. As twins they are identical with matching brown eyes, except Kai has black hair and Mei has white hair. They are of the few Orio-ya staff who have been kind to Aoi from the start. They greatly respect Aoi's cooking skills and enjoy learning her human recipes. They have been closer to Aoi since she helped them cook a meal for a difficult guest.
Taichi (太一)
Voiced by: Junko Noda
One of the orphans hired by Ranmaru.
Nobunaga (ノブナガ)
A bulldog who is Orio-ya's mascot.

== Hidden Realm residents ==
Tannosuke (反之介)
Voiced by: Tomokazu Sugita (Japanese); J. Michael Tatum (English)
A Tenjin-ya guest who is notorious for being spoiled by his rich parents. Suzuran is sold to his family by her former employer so she can be married to Tannosuke who is obsessed with her. He is always trying to obtain more money which frequently gets him in trouble. At times like these he depends on Suzuran to save him. Suzuran escapes his clutches after she travels to the Human Realm.
Matsuba (松葉)
Voiced by: Akio Ōtsuka (Japanese); R. Bruce Elliott (English)
A Tengu and lord of Mt. Shumon, the Tengu mountains. He has 6 children and, due to his friendship with her grandfather, Shiro, has decided to treat Aoi like his own granddaughter. When he first learned Aoi was indebted to Odanna, he immediately offered to pay the debt himself and to let Aoi live at Mt. Shumon and even to marry one of his sons if she wanted. He is fond of Aoi's human style cooking and is also frequently drunk and falling from high places such as bridges and airships.
Hakkabō (薄荷坊)
Voiced by: Noriaki Sugiyama (Japanese); Sonny Strait (English)
A Nyudo-bozu and journalist. He publishes about Moonflower after being impressed with Aoi's cooking, making Moonflower go viral.
Nuinoin (縫ノ陰)
Voiced by: Takuya Masumoto (Japanese); Aaron Roberts (English)
A member of the Ayakashi royal family. He met his human wife, Ritsuko, in the human world where they frequently went on dates at western style restaurants. Compared to other nobles, he is more easy-going and maybe airheaded with Byakuya simply referring to him as an idiot. He possesses a powerful magical painting with a secret realm hidden inside it as a convenient storage space for his and his wife's treasured items. He is on friendly terms with Aoi as he enjoyed the meal she cooked for his wedding anniversary.
Ritsuko (律子)
Voiced by: Kaori Mizuhashi (Japanese); Stephanie Young (English)
A human who married into the Ayakashi royal family after meeting her Ayakashi husband, Nuinoin, on one of his trips to the human realm, after which he took her in when her family died. She enjoys western style cuisine and frequently took Nuinoin to western restaurants while they were dating. She is grateful to Aoi for cooking excellent western dishes for their anniversary and gifted her a Hagoromo shawl, traditionally worn by female members of the royal court, suggesting she thinks of her as a very good friend.
Yodoko (淀子)
Voiced by: Manami Numakura (Japanese); Monica Rial (English)
An overbearing Orio-ya guest who constantly changes cravings, but willingly lends her umbrella for the ceremony after Aoi shares a monjayaki recipe with her.
Mitsunari (三成)
Voiced by: Kenji Akabane
Yodoko's right-hand man.
Raijū (雷獣)
Voiced by: Satoshi Hino (Japanese); David Wald (English)
A Thunder Beast, with the ability to control thunder and lightning. He has dark skin, blonde hair and a tattoo in the shape of a lightning bolt on the left side of his face. Despite only being seen at Orio-ya, Raiju is not a staff member and is in fact a member of the nobility equal to Ōgon-dōji. Despite his noble status, Raiju is a sadistic hedonist, caring only about his own amusement, and can be either kind or cruel on a whim. He has admitted that he has no respect for Isohime, the previous Hachiyo, or for her sacrificing her own life to save the Southern Lands. In fact, his treachery caused the failure of the curse cleansing ceremony 300 years ago that resulted in Isohime's sacrifice. He has a particular interest in Aoi's activities and intends to torture and devour her. He steals her taste buds and voice before seducing her, but Byakuya chases him away, and even Odanna warns Raiju that he will kill him if he touches Aoi again. He is highly skilled at playing the flute.
Isohime (磯姫)
Voiced by: Maaya Sakamoto (Japanese); Anastasia Muñoz (English)
Ranmaru and Ginji's adoptive mother who risks her life to keep the Southern lands at peace. Her spirit gives Aoi the mermaid scale required to make the ceremony successful.
Chibi (チビ)
Voiced by: Manaka Iwami (Japanese); Megan Shipman (English)
A miniature Kappa with the appearance of a green turtle with a blue shell that acts similar to a pigeon but can speak. Chibi is a specific Kappa Aoi is fond of feeding in the park. She thinks of him as sly and ends up taking him with her to Tenjin-ya as a pet.
Suzuran (鈴蘭)
Voiced by: Maaya Uchida (Japanese); Alexis Tipton (English)
Akatsuki's younger sister, originally a geisha at the hidden realm and also a tsuchigumo. She once lived with Shiro in the human world and longed to be by his side. Like her brother, her Ayakashi form is also a giant spider, though unlike her brother she is white with pink eyes and pink markings along her back and much thinner legs. After returning to the human world she decides to live in the cemetery near Shiro's grave for a while. Despite being younger than her brother, she is a better fighter than him as she was able to defeat him in a fight during an argument about her plan to return to the human realm.
Sasara (笹良)
Voiced by: Kaori Nazuka
A heron who was betrothed to Matsuba. After cooking gameni which Matsuba claims is not what he expects, their third son Hatori rebelled against him. Matsuba expelled Hatori from Mt. Shumon after the latter tried selling away their secret liquor. Sasara died from an illness, but nevertheless still believes Hatori will reunite with Matsuba. Aoi later cooks two types of gameni for the father and son, where it turns out Sasara cooked hers with boneless chicken, so that no one in her large family would choke on bones. This clears the misunderstanding between Hatori and Matsuba.
Shirō Tsubaki (津場木 史郎, Tsubaki Shirō)
Voiced by: Kazuhiko Inoue (Japanese); Brian Mathis (English)
Aoi's grandfather from whom she inherited her ability to see Ayakashi and who first taught her to cook. Shiro raised Aoi by himself after her mother left her. Shiro was famous among Ayakashi as he possessed an ability to travel between the human and Hidden Realm at will. Every Ayakashi who knew him personally either hated him for various reasons or considered him a close friend. During a visit to Tenjin-ya, he went on an extravagant spending spree, ending up indebted to Odanna for 100 million yen, resulting in him offering Aoi's hand in marriage as payment. Odanna thought of Shiro as his friend. He died in hospital several days before Aoi met Odanna as a result of falling and hitting his head.
Umi-bōzu (海坊主)
Voiced by: Inori Minase
An extremely powerful Ayakashi who lives deep in the ocean and is a mass of impure energy that causes natural disasters wherever it goes and leaves behind it a miasma that drains the spiritual energy of other Ayakashi. These natural disasters have a strong negative impact on the Southern Land, leaving most of the people poverty stricken and making it incredibly dangerous for fishermen to fish in the Southern Ocean, many of whom die. There exists a ceremony that must be performed once every 100 years that can hold the disasters at bay by placating him. Despite the damage he causes with his power, Isohime, the adoptive mother of Ranmaru and Ginji, discovered that he dislikes causing disasters or being alone and is actually quite kind and gentle.
