= Sakabashira =

Folk belief about wooden structures in Japan

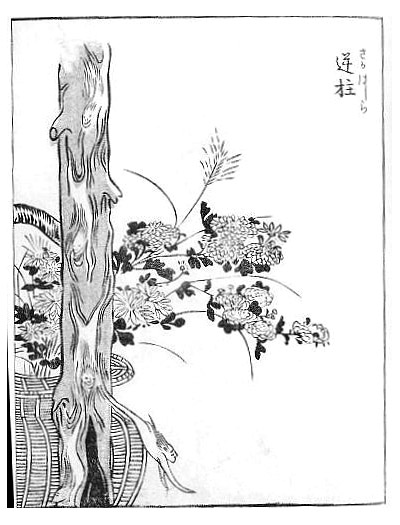
"Sakabashira" (逆柱) from the Gazu Hyakki Yagyō by Sekien Toriyama

Sakabashira (逆柱; さかばしら) or sakasabashira (逆さ柱; さかさばしら), meaning "reverse pillar", is a folk belief about wooden structures in Japan, and it refers to reversing the vertical direction of a tree from its original direction of growth when using it to make a pillar in a wooden building.

== Concept ==
Since ancient times, a tree made into a reverse pillar is said to cause things like yanari to occur at night. Besides making family fortunes decline, they were also said to cause unfortunate events such as fires, so they were greatly detested.

The yōkai comic artist Mizuki Shigeru said that a reversed pillar would be a source of tree leaves yōkai, or that the pillar itself would turn into a yōkai.

In Saikaku Oridome (西鶴織留), a piece of writing by Ihara Saikaku, a couple that lived in a house in front of the Kyoto Rokkaku-dō was tormented by this sakabashira paranormal phenomenon, and it is said that the sound of shattering beams would echo every night in that house, which led them to eventually move elsewhere.

Also, in Odawara, it is said that a certain merchant was in the middle of a celebration when there was a voice that could be heard saying "my neck hurts", and upon looking for the source of the voice, it turned out that the voice came from the pillar in the zashiki (guest room), which is how the merchant knew that this pillar was a reverse pillar (sakabashira).

== Reversed pillars that ward against calamity ==
It is known that there is a reversed pillar at the gate Yōmeimon at Nikkō Tōshō-gū. This is because among the pillars, only one has its engraving patterns reversed, which is how it is known to be a reversed pillar. This is not reversed by mistake, but rather a trick in order to avoid the legend that "once the structure is complete, it will then start to collapse", so it is said that the building was intentionally left incomplete in order to avoid disaster, meaning that this reverse pillar was for warding against calamity. Furthermore, this is a completely different thing from the reversed pillars in yōkai legends. According to the Kamakura period Tsurezuregusa, something that is perfect is never good, so when building a dairi, one spot will be left not fully built. It is said that in the Edo Period, people said to "leave it three tiles unfinished".

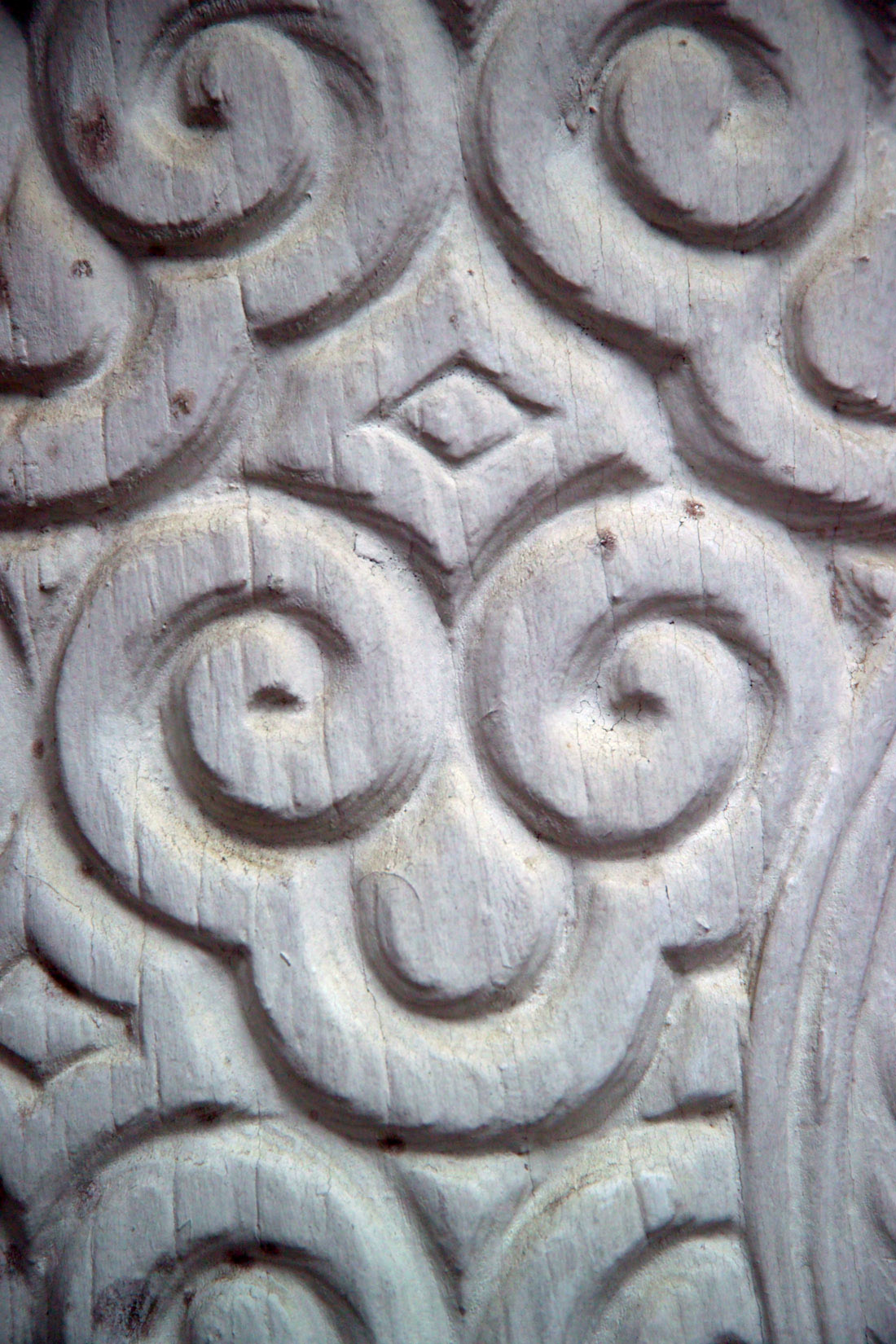
The pattern on a pillar at the Yōmeimon at Nikkō Tōshō-gū

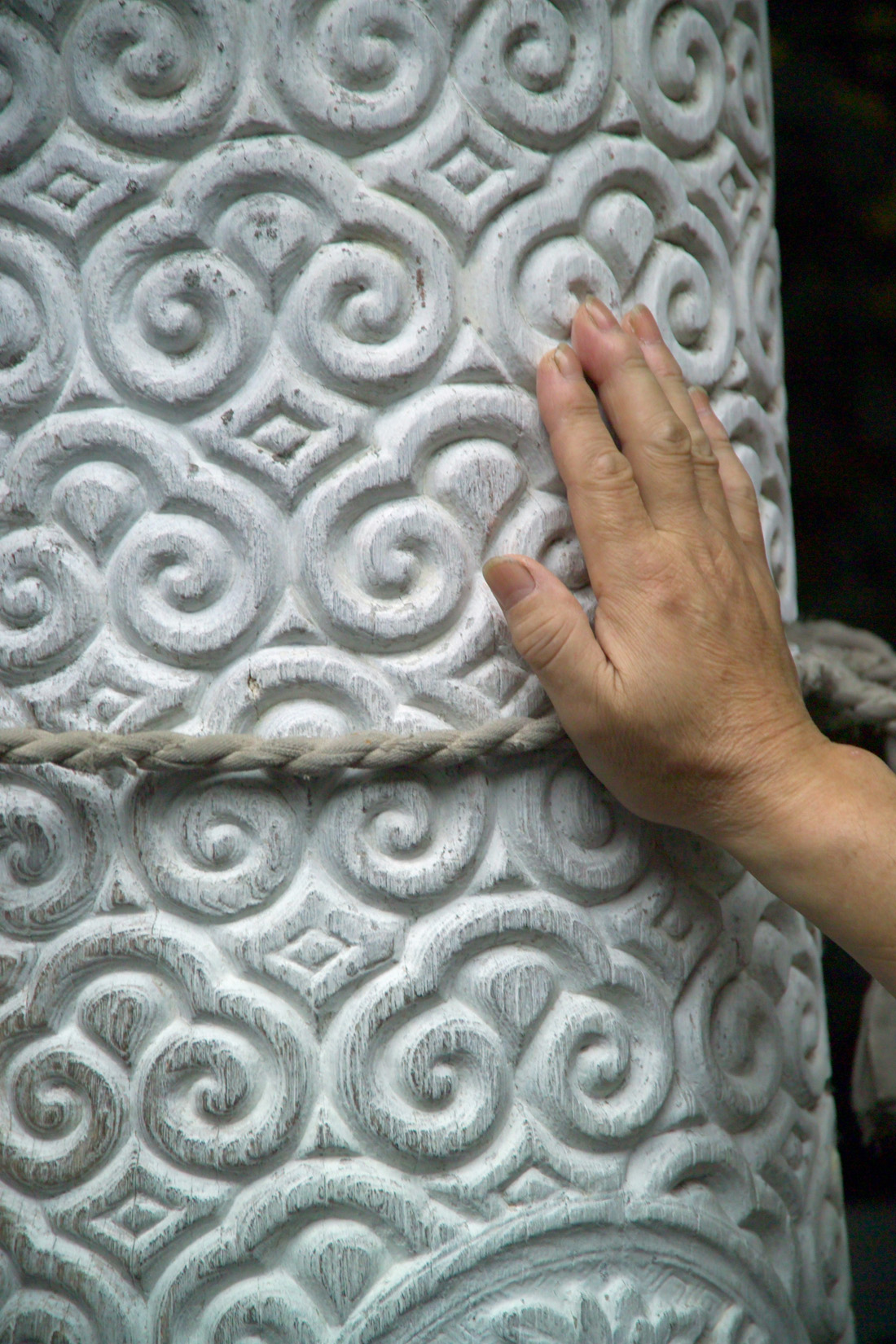
The reverse pillar at Yōmeimon. Compared to the picture on the left, the pattern is vertically reversed.
