= Gazu Hyakki Yagyō =

Japanese book published in 1776

Gazu Hyakki Yagyō (画図百鬼夜行, "The Illustrated Night Parade of a Hundred Demons" or The Illustrated Demon Horde's Night Parade) is the first book of Japanese artist Toriyama Sekien's famous Gazu Hyakki Yagyō e-hon tetralogy, published in 1776. A version of the tetralogy translated and annotated in English was published in 2016. Although the title translates to "The Illustrated Night Parade of a Hundred Demons", it is based on an idiom, hyakki yagyō, that is akin to pandemonium in English and implies an uncountable horde. The book is followed by Konjaku Gazu Zoku Hyakki, Konjaku Hyakki Shūi, and Gazu Hyakki Tsurezure Bukuro.

The book is a supernatural bestiary, a collection of ghosts, spirits, spooks and monsters from literature, folklore, and other artwork. The art of Gazu Hyakki Yagyō heavily references a 1737 scroll-painting called the Hyakkai Zukan by artist Sawaki Sūshi; Sekien's innovation was preparing the illustrations as woodblock prints that could be mass-produced in a bound book format. Intended as a parody of then-popular reference books such as the Wakan Sansai Zue, it ended up becoming a reference book in its own right, profoundly influencing subsequent yōkai imagery in Japan. The book proved popular enough to be reprinted three times over the course of the Edo era by various book-sellers. The book is compiled in three sub-volumes: Yin, Yang, and Wind. Yin features a foreword by poet Maki Tōei, while Wind ends with an afterword by Sekien.

== First Volume "Yin" – 陰 ==
The first volume of Gazu Hyakki Yagyō, called "Yin", includes the following yōkai.

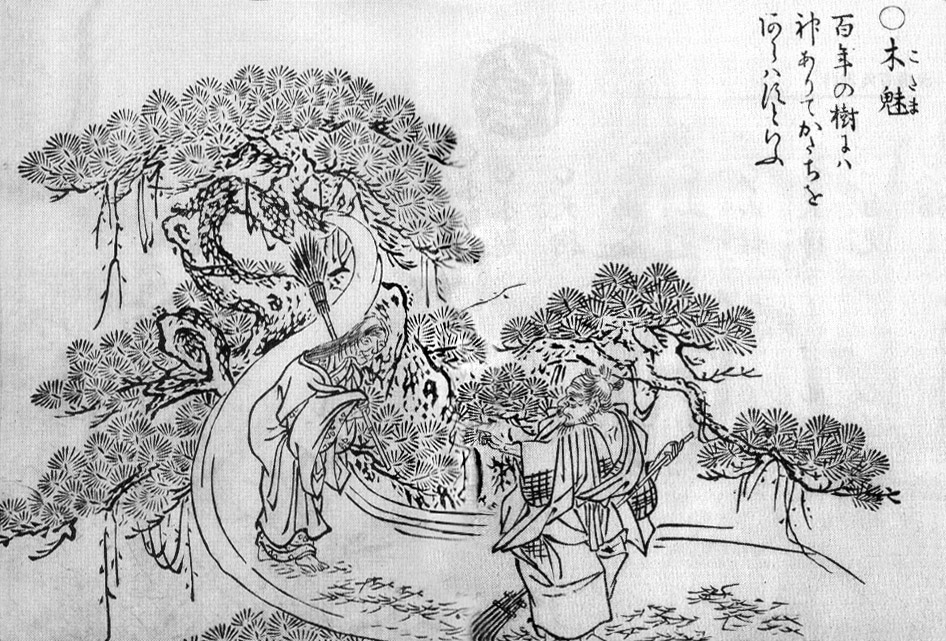
Kodama (木魅)
Sekien's comments: (kami) are said to appear in ancient trees. (百年の樹には神ありてかたちをあらはすといふ。)

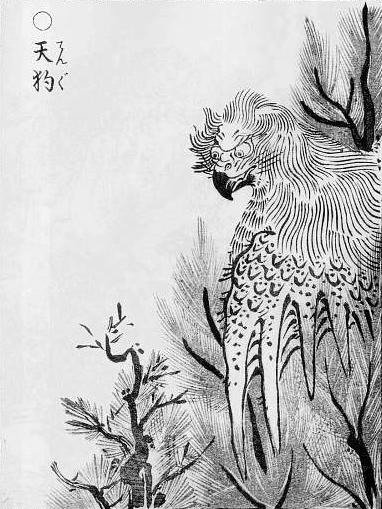
Tengu (天狗)

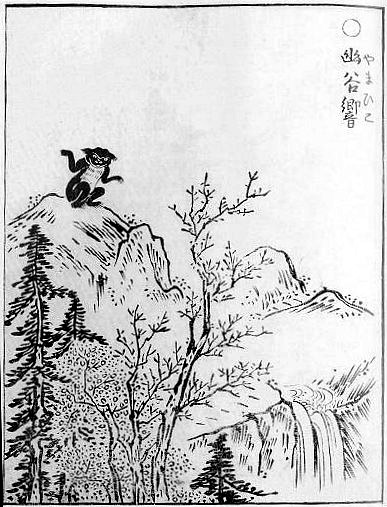
Yamabiko (幽谷響)

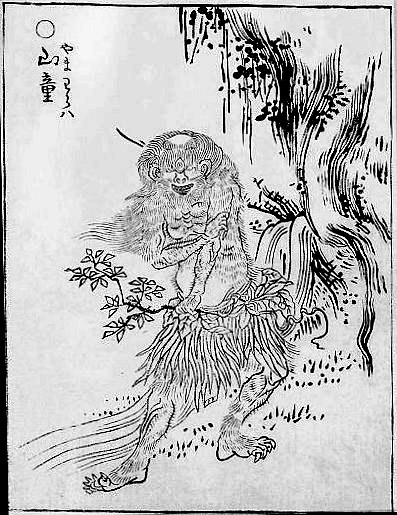
Yamawaro (山童)

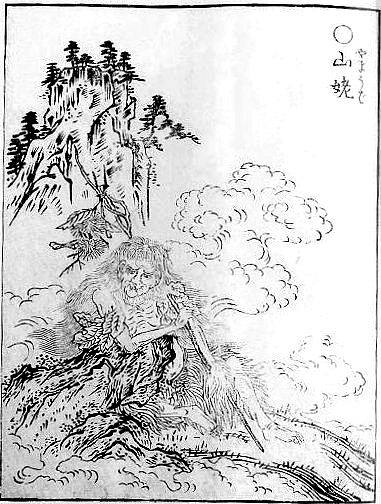
Yamauba (山姥)

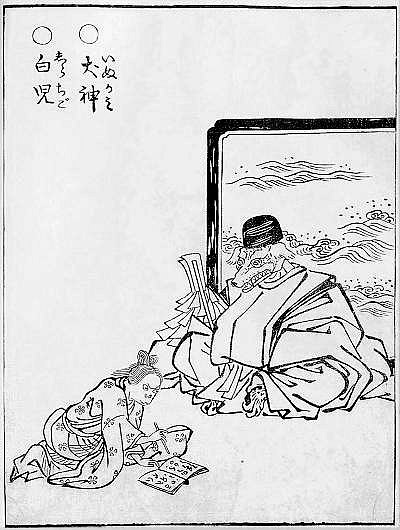
Inugami (犬神)
Sekien depicted it accompanied by a smaller creature called Shirachigo (白児).

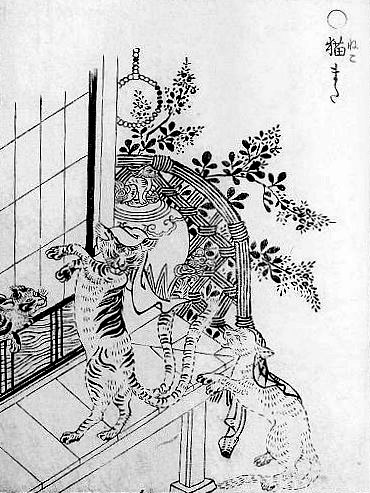
Nekomata (猫股)

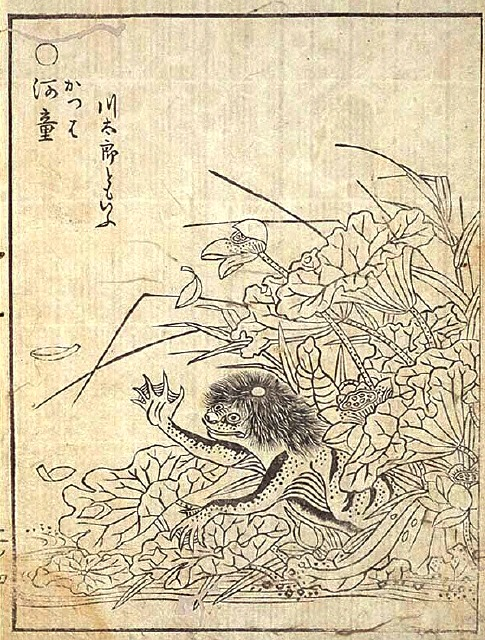
Kappa (河童)
Sekien's comments: It is also called kawatarō. (川太郎ともいふ。)

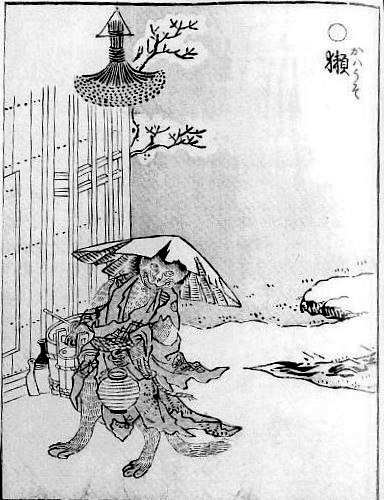
Kawauso (獺) (River otter)

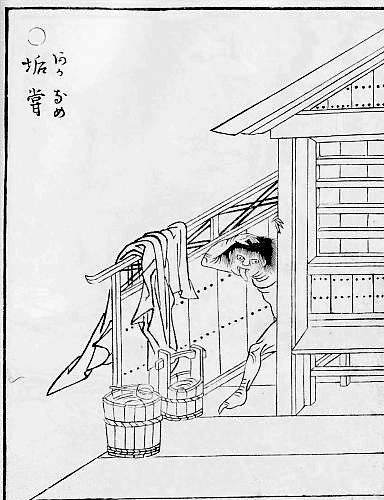
Akaname (垢嘗)

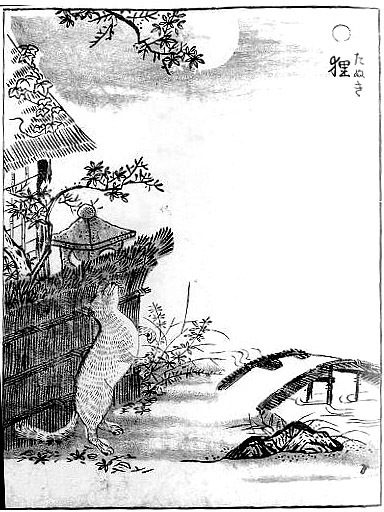
Tanuki (狸) (raccoon dog)

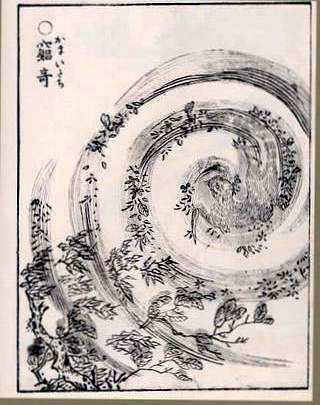
Kamaitachi (窮奇)

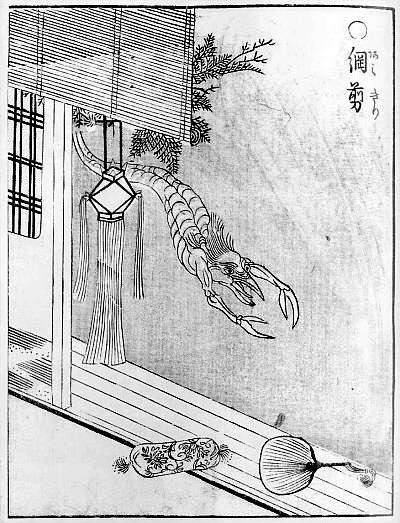
Amikiri (網剪)

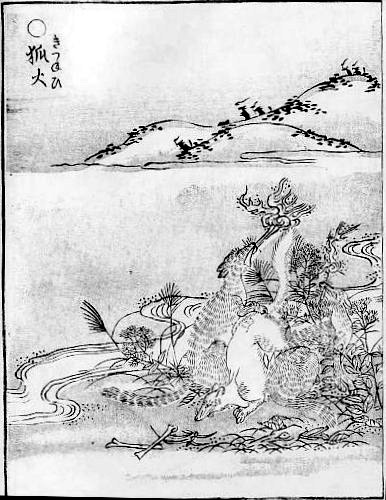
Kitsunebi (狐火) (Fox-fire)

== Second Volume "Yang" – 陽 ==
The second volume of Gazu Hyakki Yagyō, called "Yang", includes the following yōkai.

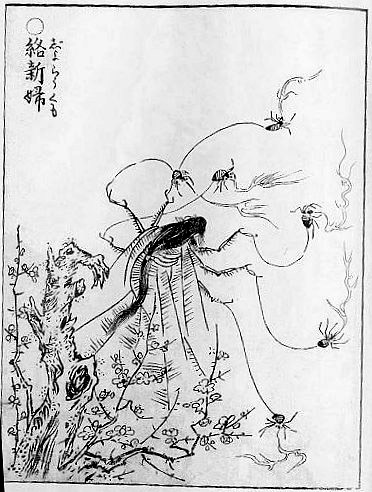
Jorōgumo (ja:絡新婦)

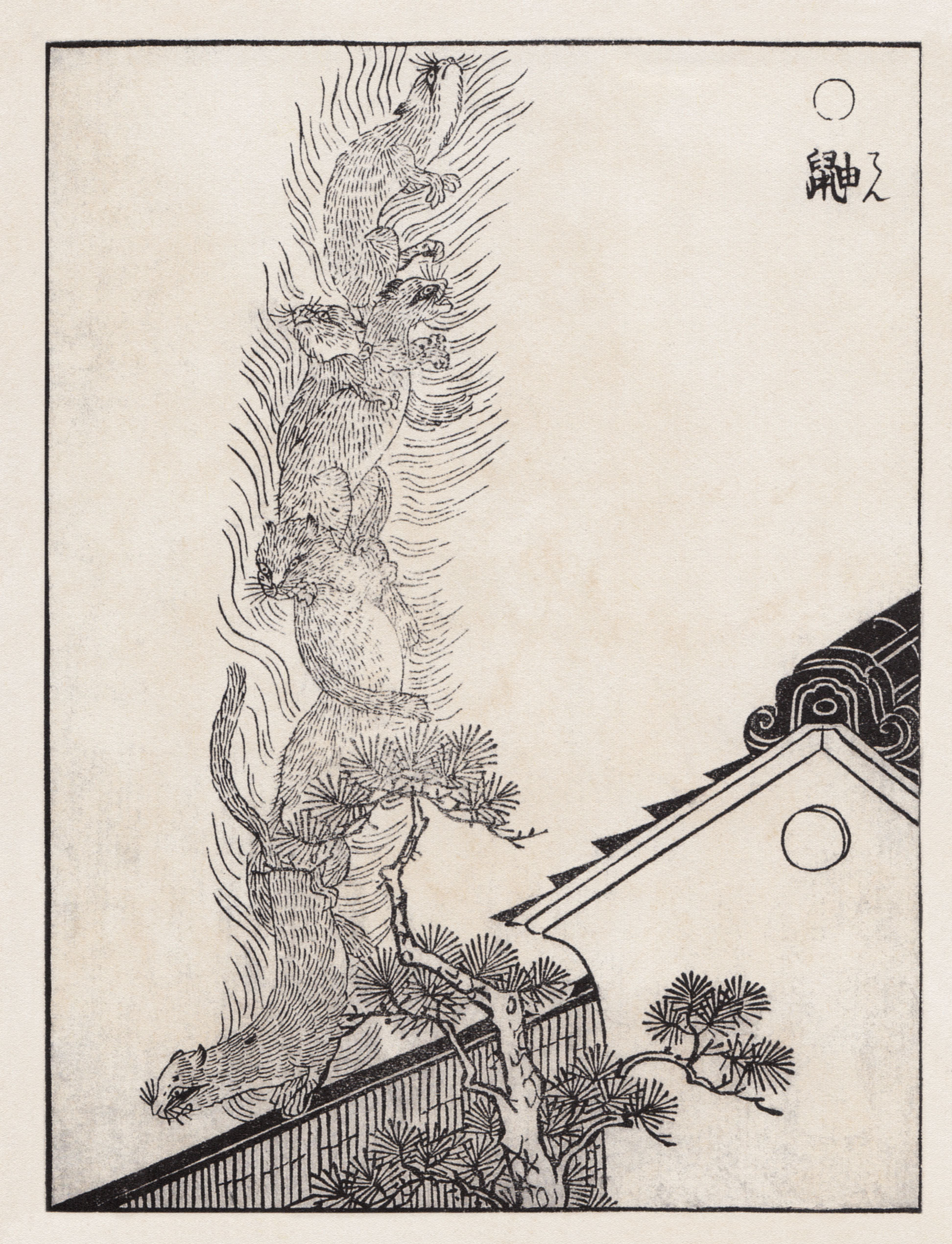
Ten (鼬), (Marten)

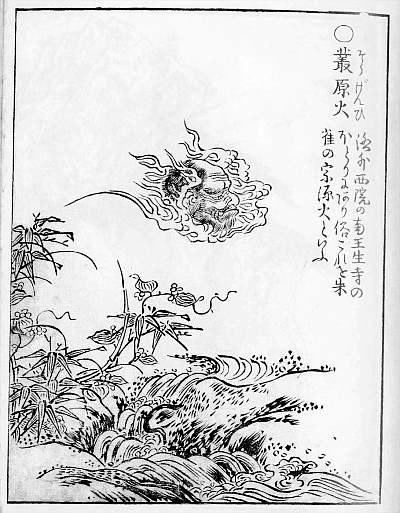
Sōgenbi (ja:叢原火)
Sekien's comments: It can be found in the west of Saiin outside the capital, near Mibudera temple. It is also called Sōgenbi of Suzaku.

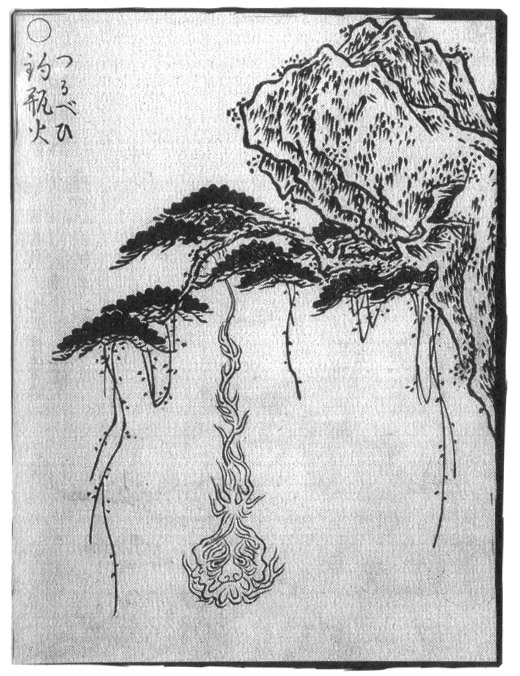
Tsurubebi (ja:釣瓶火)

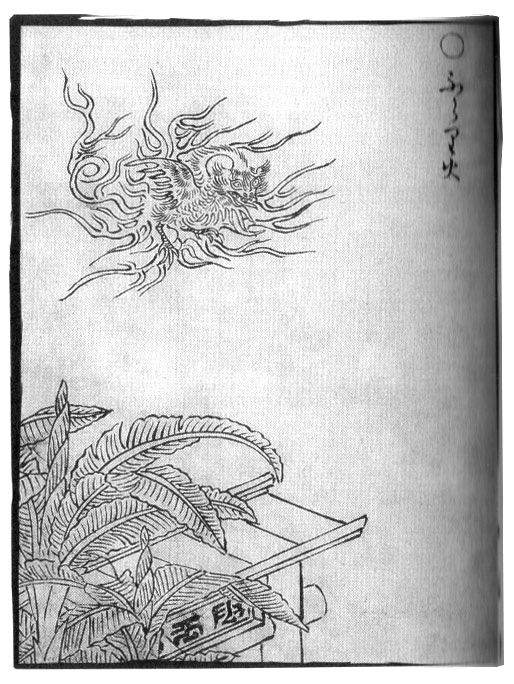
Furaribi (ja:ふらり火)

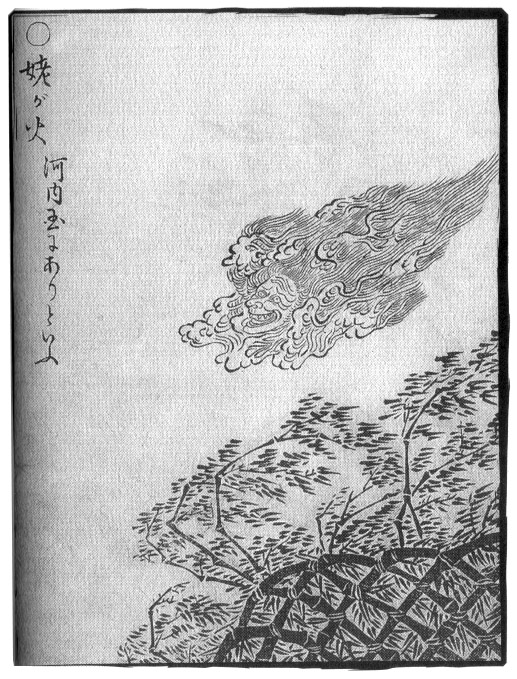
Ubagabi (ja:姥ヶ火).
Sekien's comments: It is said to appear in Kawachi Province.

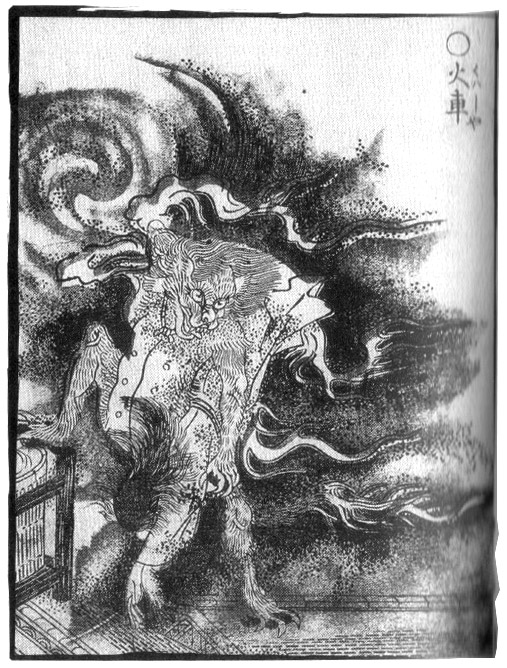
Kasha (ja:火車)

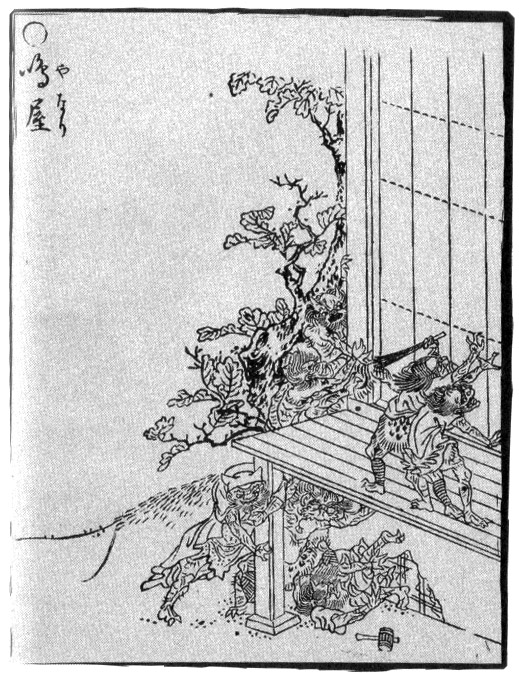
Yanari (ja:鳴屋)

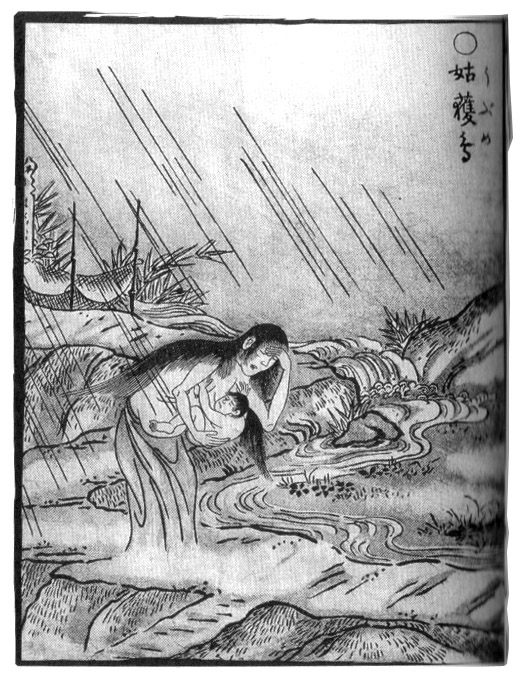
Ubume (ja:産女)

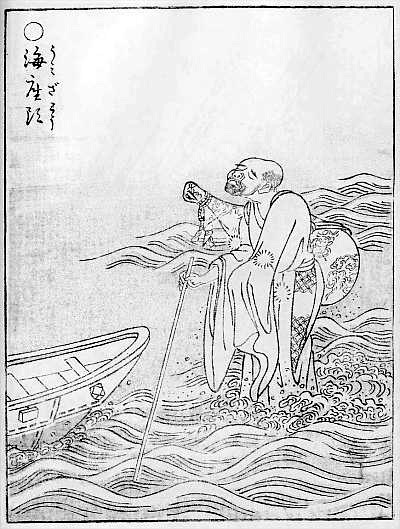
Umi zatō (ja:海座頭)

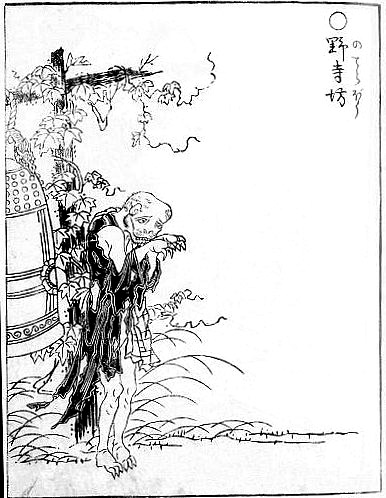
Noderabō (ja:野寺坊)

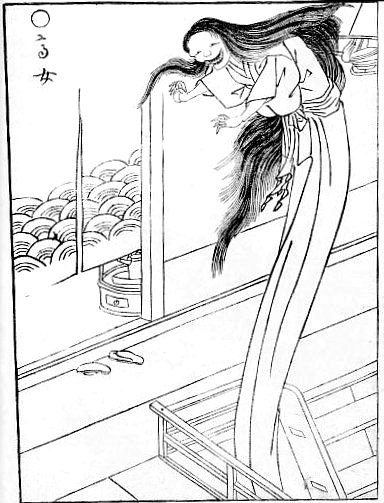
Takaonna (ja:高女)

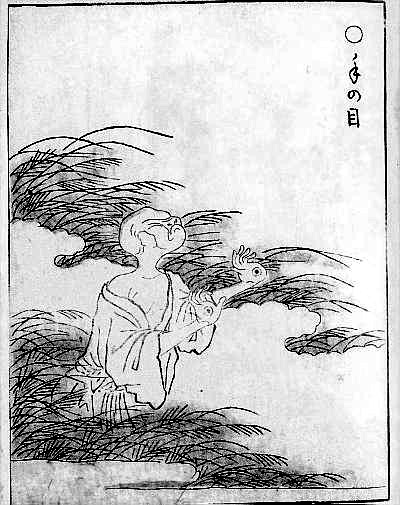
Tenome (ja:手の目)

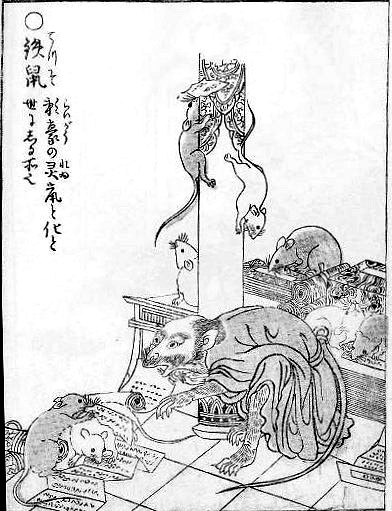
Tesso (ja:鉄鼠).
Sekien's comments: Raigō became a plague of rats, and went into the world.

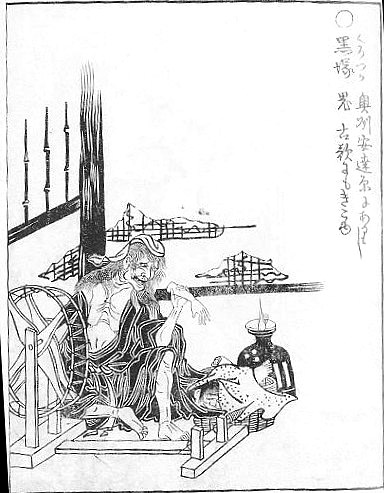
Kurozuka (ja:黒塚)

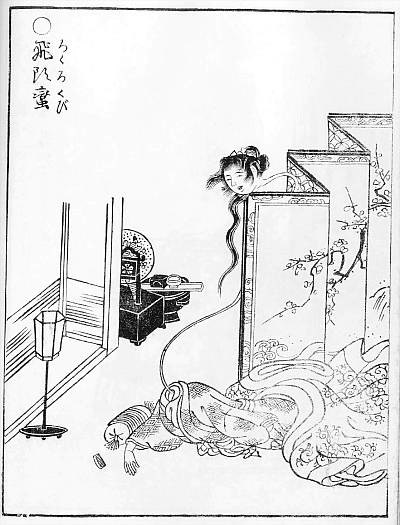
Rokurokubi (ja:ろくろ首)

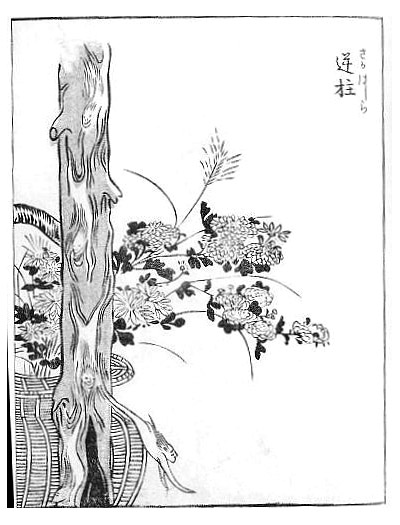
Sakabashira (ja:逆柱)

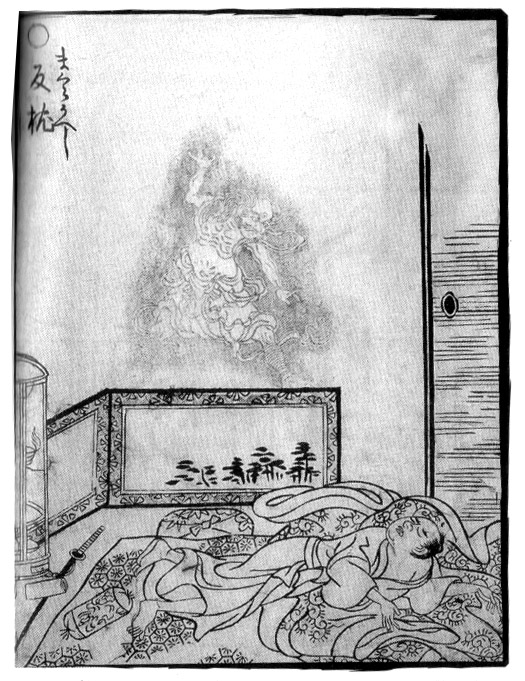
Makuragaeshi (ja:枕返し)

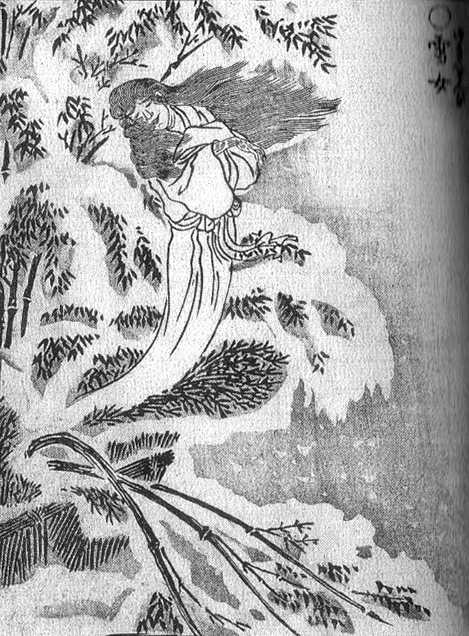
Yuki-onna (ja:雪女)

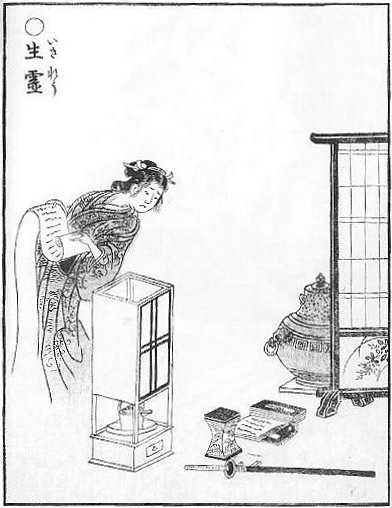
Ikiryō (ja:生霊)

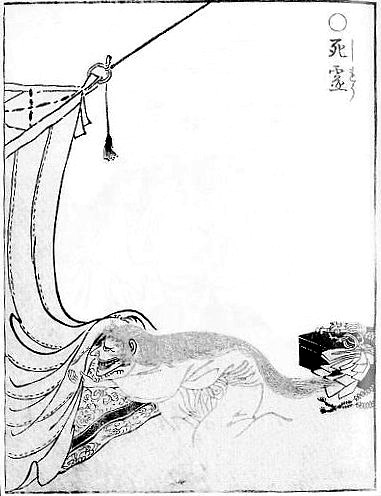
Shiryō (ja:死霊)

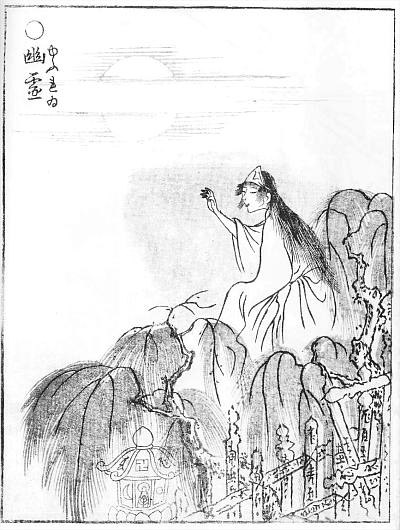
Yūrei (幽霊)

== Third Volume "Wind" – 風 ==
The third volume of Gazu Hyakki Yagyō, called "Wind", includes the following yōkai.

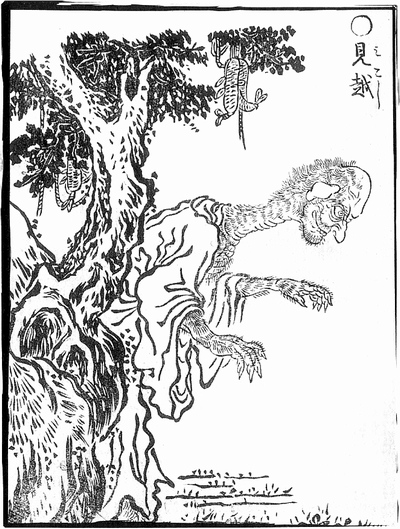
Mikoshi (見越, ja:見越し入道)

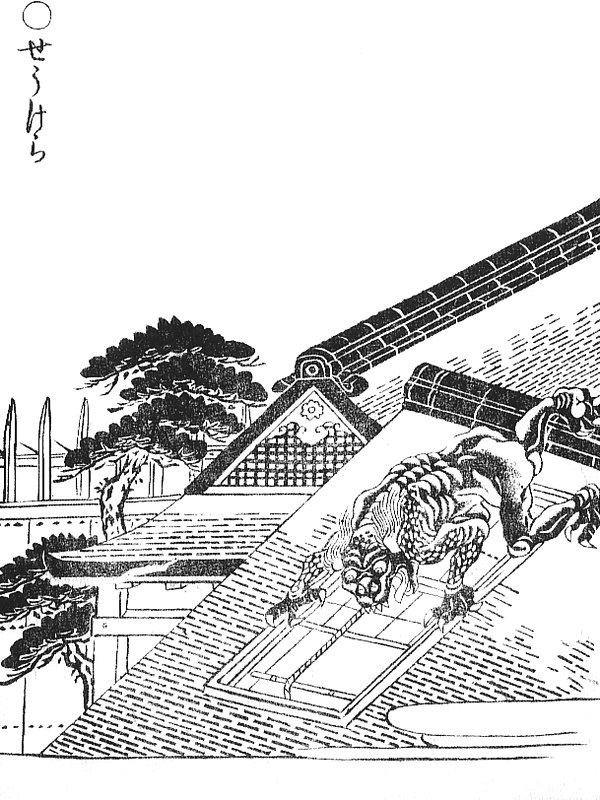
Shōkera (ja:しょうけら)

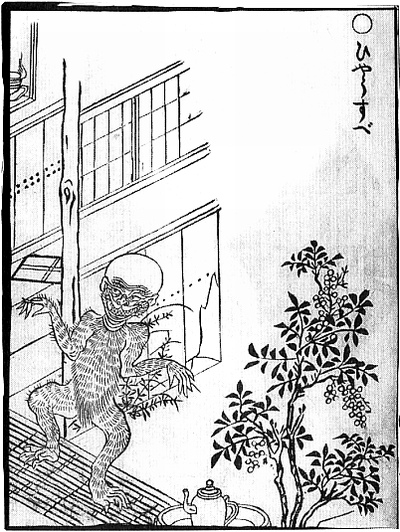
Hyōsube (ja:ひょうすべ)

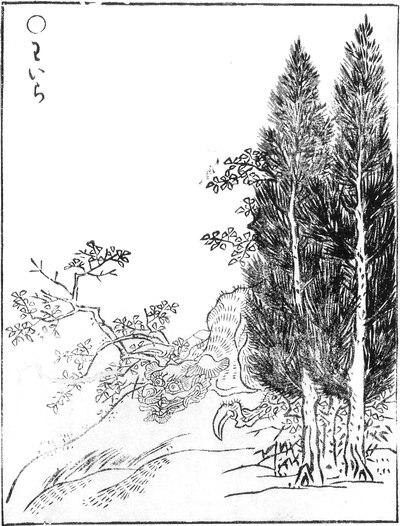
Waira (ja:わいら)

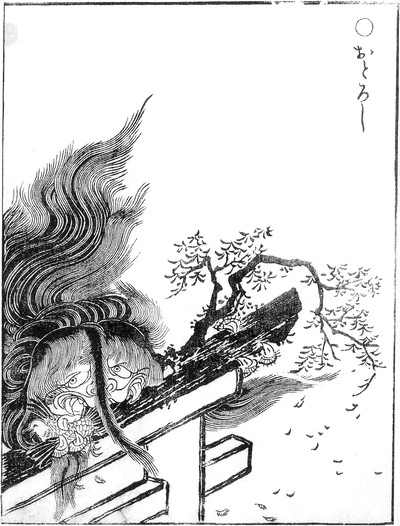
Otoroshi (ja:おとろし)

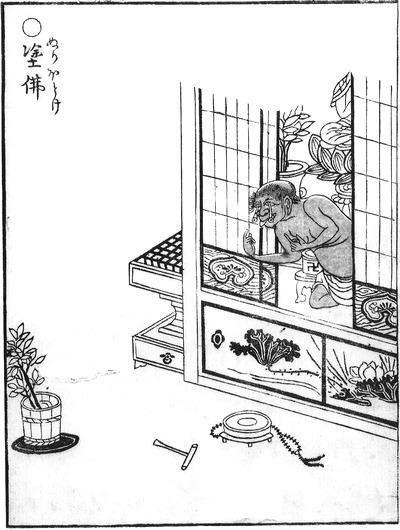
Nuribotoke (ja:塗仏)

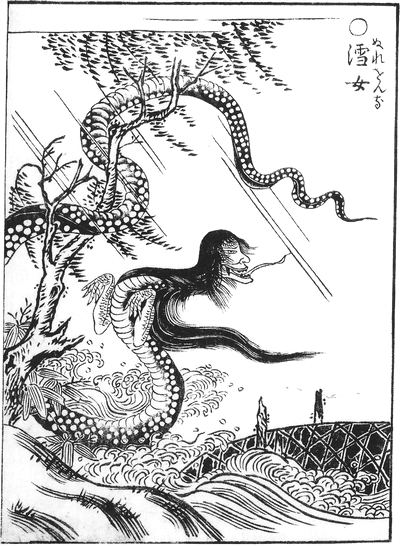
Nure-onna (ja:濡れ女)

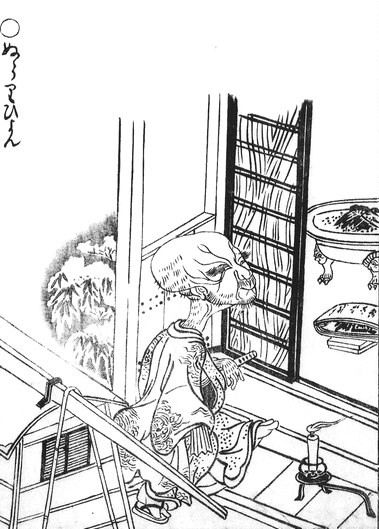
Nurarihyon (ぬらりひょん)

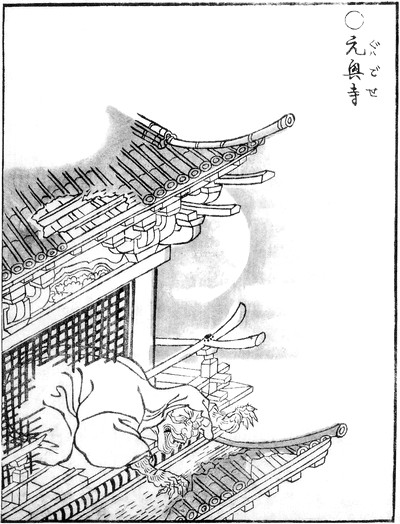
Gagoze (元興寺)

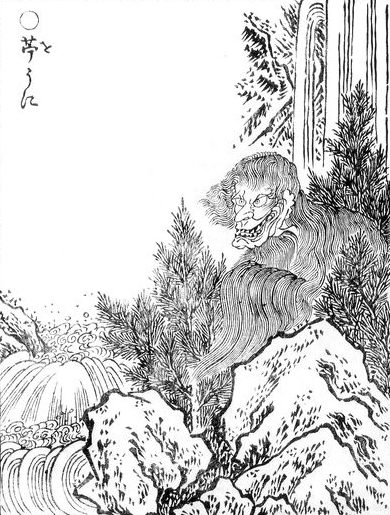
Ouni (ja:苧うに)

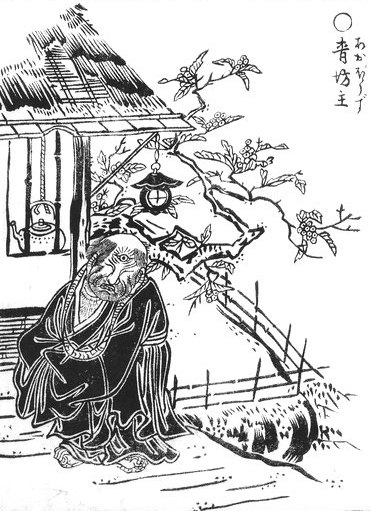
Aobōzu (青坊主)

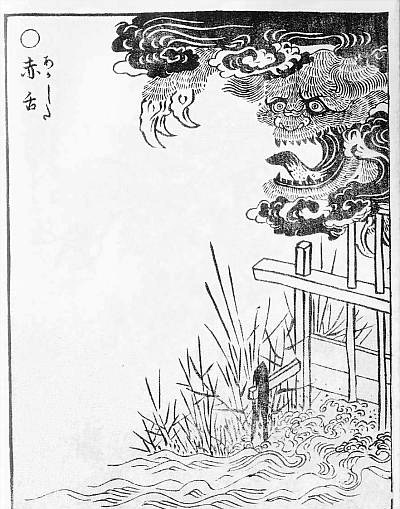
Akashita (赤舌)

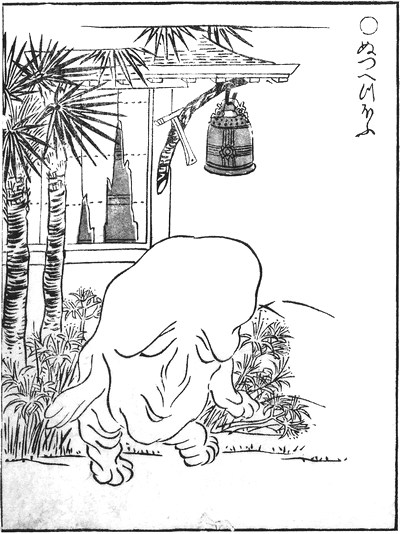
Nuppeppō (ぬっぺっぽう, ぬっぺふほふ)

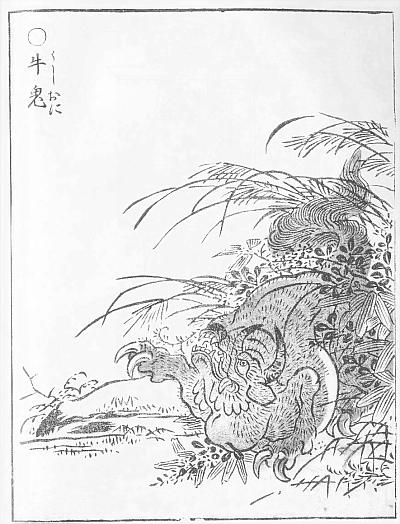
Ushi-oni (牛鬼)

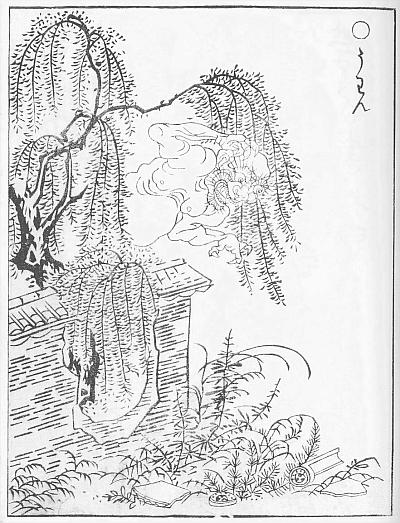
Uwan (うわん)

== See also ==
- Gazu Hyakki Tsurezure Bukuro
- Konjaku Gazu Zoku Hyakki
- Konjaku Hyakki Shūi

== Bibliography ==
- Yoda, Hiroko (2017). Japandemonium Illustrated: The Yokai Encyclopedias of Toriyama Sekien. New York: Dover Publications. ISBN 978-0-486-80035-6.
- Toriyama, Sekien (July 2005). Toriyama Sekien Gazu Hyakki Yagyō Zen Gashū (in Japanese). Tokyo: Kadokawa Shoten Publishing Co., Ltd. pp. 10–65. ISBN 978-4-04-405101-3.
- "Hyakki Zufu Obake Iroha Sakuin". CSK Pavilion: Hyakki Yagyō.
