= Takaonna =

Japanese yokai

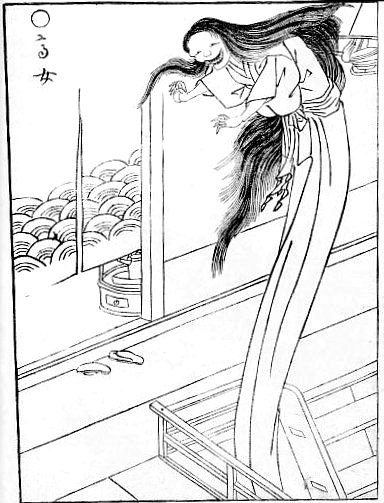
"Takaonna" (高女) from the Gazu Hyakki Yagyō by Toriyama Sekien

Takaonna (高女, "tall woman") was a Japanese yōkai that appeared in the Gazu Hyakki Yagyō by Toriyama Sekien.

== Concept ==
The Gazu (illustrated reference) above depicts a woman with an elongated lower body next to what appears to be a brothel. However, the Gazu Hyakki Yagyō has no explanatory text, so it is unclear what kind of yōkai this depiction was intended to be. Some believe that this yōkai was an original invention designed to parody the Yoshiwara Yūkaku of the Edo period.

The book Yōkaigadan Zenshū Nihonhen Jō (妖怪画談全集 日本編 上, "Complete Analysis of Yōkai Paintings, Volume Japan, First Part") by the folklorist Morihiko Fujisawa explains that in a story from the Wakayama Prefecture called Takanyōbō (高女房, "Tall Woman"), a Takaonna would frighten people on the second floors of girō (brothels).

The book Tōhoku Kaidan no Tabi (Travels for Mysterious Tales of Tōhoku) by the novelist Norio Yamada, the kaidan (mysterious tale) titled "Takaonna" depicts the Takaonna as a homely woman who could never be with a man when she was alive. Transformed into a yōkai from her own desire, she wanders the earth, elongating her body to peek into the second floor of brothels to look at what she could never have.

These two depictions of the Takaonna became generally accepted in post-war literature, but yōkai researcher Kenji Murakami notes that Fujisawa's explanation is nothing more than one interpretation of Sekien's painting and that Yamada's kaidan is a completely different tale that shares the name of Takaonna.

== Incident ==
In 2016, August 2, staff at the Hidakakōshioya Ryokuchi Park in Gobō, Wakayama Prefecture discovered that a stone statue of a Takaonna had been severed at its base. This Takaonna statue was based on Mizuki Shigeru's design and has been displayed alongside 9 other yōkai statues since 2009. On the 10th of the same month, the torso of the Takaonna statue was discovered at the bottom of the harbor (at a depth of 4.5 meters) and was raised back up; its right hand was broken. On September 16 at around 5:00 AM, the Gobō police station pressed charges against a male high school student for inflicting property damage after kicking the Takaonna statue (which has an estimated worth of 120 thousand yen). This incident boosted the popularity of the Takaonna legend.

== See also ==
- List of legendary creatures from Japan
- Rokurokubi
- Slender Man
