= Noderabō =

Japanese mythical creatures

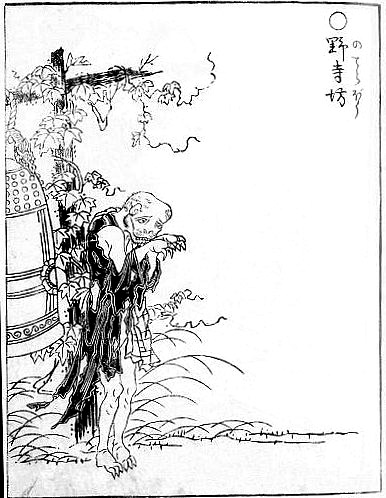
"Noderabō " from the Gazu Hyakki Yagyō by Toriyama Sekien

The noderabō is a Japanese yōkai from Toriyama Sekien's Gazu Hyakki Yagyō and is thought to be a yōkai that appears at abandoned temples.

The Gazu Hyakki Yagyō depicts a yōkai that looks like a monk wearing a tattered kasa standing next to a temple bell, but there is no explanation from Sekien about what this is about, so it is not known what characteristics this yōkai was intended to have.

Beginning in the Shōwa period, literature about yōkai often explained that they are a yōkai that appear at deserted dilapidated temples or that they are resulting the grudges turned yōkai of a chief priest whose temple became dilapidated from lack of donations from villagers, which would then appear at evenings at the dilapidated temple and ring the bell alone at the deserted temple.

== Analysis ==
As it is not clear what Sekien drew here, starting from the Heisei period, several hypotheses have been put forth, and one of them supposes that this is an original creation from Sekien that was made to satirize the Edo Period monks who broke their precepts. In modern times, pictures and tales in a similar mold that depict priests who broke their precepts out of an attachment to greed and lust and thus became yōkai can be often be found, and examples of these can often be found in publications near Sekien's time.

In the writings of the comic artist Mizuki Shigeru, there is a statement about the noderabō that when children would hear the sound of a bell in the mountains despite there being no temple, they were told that "it's because of the noderabō," but actually it was because of the mountain, and a phenomenon like yamabiko had occurred.

Also, in Niiza, Saitama Prefecture, there is a place called "Nodera," and there was once a man who tried to menace the residents of a village, so he tried to steal a nearby famous bell when a traveler happened to pass by, in a panic, he hid himself at a pond, and as a result he lost sight of the bell. This lake came to be called the Kanegabuchi (鐘ヶ渕, "bell abyss"), and it is also said that once a young monk disregarded a task asked for by the chief priest and instead played with the children, and in gloom from feeling unable to meet face-to-face with the priest, went into the pond water, and ever since then, a cry from the pond can be heard every evening. It is also surmised that Sekien could have drawn this yōkai called noderabō based on the place names Nodera and Kanegabuchi.

However, as for what exactly Sekien based this noderabō drawing on, considering the general tendency of all the yōkai included in the Gazu Hyakki Yagyō and the meagerness of the information shown in the drawings, there is very little material that can serve as evidence for any conclusion.
