= Nure-onna =

Japanese yōkai

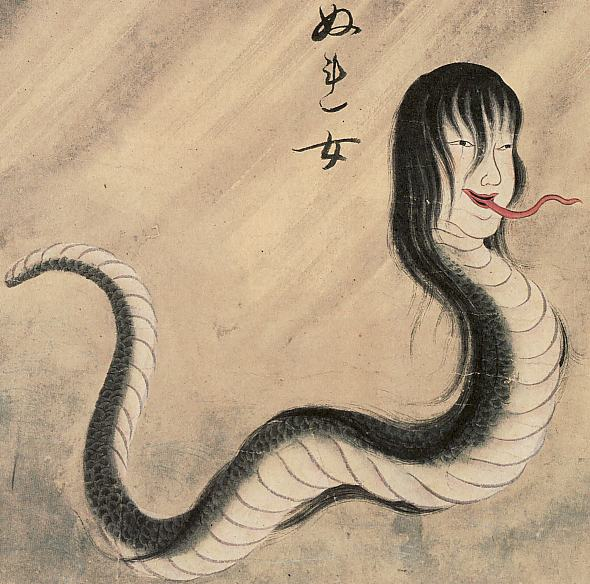
"Nure-onna" (ぬれ女) from the Hyakkai-Zukan by Sawaki Suushi.

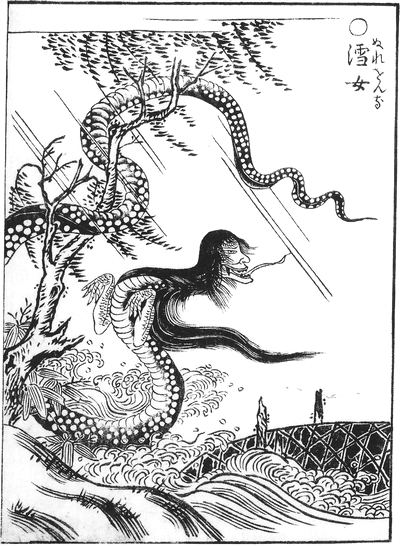
"Nure-onna" (濡女) from the Gazu Hyakki Yagyō by Toriyama Sekien

Nure-onna (濡女, "wet woman") is a Japanese yōkai which resembles a reptilian creature with the head of a woman and the body of a snake. They are also seen as a paranormal phenomenon at sea under the name of nureyomejo. In legends, they are often said to consume humans, but they have no single appearance or personality.

== Concept ==
They are similar to the yōkai called isoonna of Kyushu, and like the isoonna, they are said to appear at seas or rivers. Their name comes from how their hair is always wet in legends. They are also theorized to be the changed form of sea snakes.

Many Edo Period publications such as the Hyakkai Zukan, Gazu Hyakki Yagyō, among others, depict this yōkai as a woman with a snake body, which would make it appear as if this was a well-known yōkai of the time, but there are no stories about a snake-bodied nure-onna in the classical literature of the time that can be found. Despite this, according to the essay Yōkai Gadan Zenshū, Jō (妖怪画談全集 日本篇 上, "Discussion on Yōkai Pictures, Japan Volume, First Half") by the early Shōwa period folklorist Morihiko Fujisawa, despite not pointing out any primary sources as references, it states that there is the following story from the year Bunkyū 2 (1819) of the Edo Period.

At a certain riverside on the border between Echigo Province (now Niigata Prefecture) and Aizu (now Fukushima Prefecture), as some young lads were heading out on several boats to collect wood, one boat was swept far away. The people on the swept away boat found one woman washing her hair, and they thought it was mysterious at first, but eventually they raised a scream and desperately started rowing their boat.
They finally reunited with the other boats they were originally with, and when one of those others asked, "did you see a big snake or something?" the ones who were swept away answered, "something even more terrifying. It was a wet woman (nure-onna)!" The others did not believe them and ignored the attempts by ones who were swept away to stop them, and headed towards where that woman was. The ones who were previously swept away turned back out of fear, but the others who went to the nure-onna heard a terrifying scream beneath them several times. It is said that the nure-onna has a tail that is at least 3 chō (about 327 meters) long, so once one is found, there is no escape, and it is said that those others never returned.

In this story, the nure-onna was not directly given an appearance, but the tail with a length of at least 3 chō would appear to imply a snake body. They can also be seen in the essay Tōhoku Kaidan no Tabi by Norio Yamada and in the essay Zusetsu: Nihon Mikakunin Seibutsu Jiten (図説・日本未確認生物事典, "Illustrated: An Encyclopedia of Japanese Cryptids") by the literature professor Yoshiko Sasama, but likewise they do not provide any examples of primary sources.

== Folklore ==
In the Iwami region of Shimane Prefecture, the "nure-onna" is a mysterious water being used by ushi-oni, and it would appear by the sea and hand over a baby it is hugging to someone and then return to the sea, whereupon an ushi-oni would appear. The person who was requested to hold the baby would usually then try to throw the baby and run away, but by then, the baby would have turned into a heavy stone that would not separate. The person would then be killed and eaten by the ushi-oni, according to legend. Therefore, it is said that if one is asked to hug a baby, one ought to do so only after putting on gloves, and when fleeing, one ought to toss everything, including the gloves. In the legends of Ōda, Shimane, a man entrusted with a baby from the nure-onna would be assaulted by an ushi-oni, and just when it seems like he lost their trail, the ushi-oni would then say "too bad, too bad," and it'd be in the same voice as the nure-onna.

In classical yōkai depictions such as the Gazu Hyakki Yagyō and Hyakkai Zukan, the nure-onna would have a human face and a snake body, and the concept of feminine water turmoil is generally symbolized with the snake, but in certain tales about the nure-onna, they would appear as an ubume who would make people hug babies. Both of them would hand over a baby symbolizing impurity and chaos, and both of them would lead humans to their deaths.

== Mythology ==
A nure-onna's intentions are unknown. In some stories, she is a monstrous being who is powerful enough to crush trees with her tail and feeds on humans. She carries with her a small, childlike bundle, which she uses to attract potential victims. If a well-intentioned person offers to hold the baby for her, the nure-onna will let them. If they attempt to discard the bundle, however, it is revealed that it is not a child at all. Instead, the bundle becomes incredibly heavy and prevents the victim from fleeing. She then uses her long, snake-like tongue to suck all the blood from her victim's body. In other stories, a nure-onna is simply seeking solitude as she washes her hair and reacts violently to those who bother her. The rokurokubi is a close relative to the nure-onna.
