= Tesso =

Creature in Japanese mythology

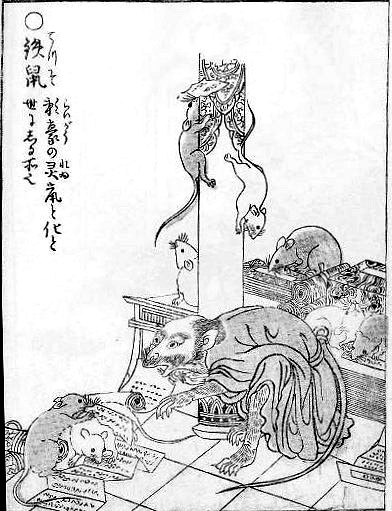
"Tesso" (鉄鼠) from the Gazu Hyakki Yagyō by Toriyama Sekien. The text on the top left reads, "it is the place known to the world where Raigō's spirit turned into a rat" (頼豪の灵（霊）鼠と化(かす)と世尓(に)志(し)る所也)

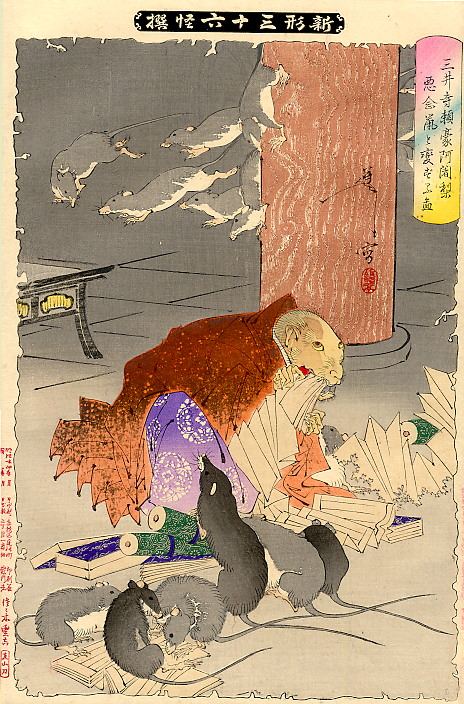
"Mii-dera Raigō Ajari Akunen Nezumi to Henzuru Zu" from the Shinkei Sanjūrokkai Sen by Tsukioka Yoshitoshi. It faithfully depicts the writings in the Genpei Jōsuiki.。

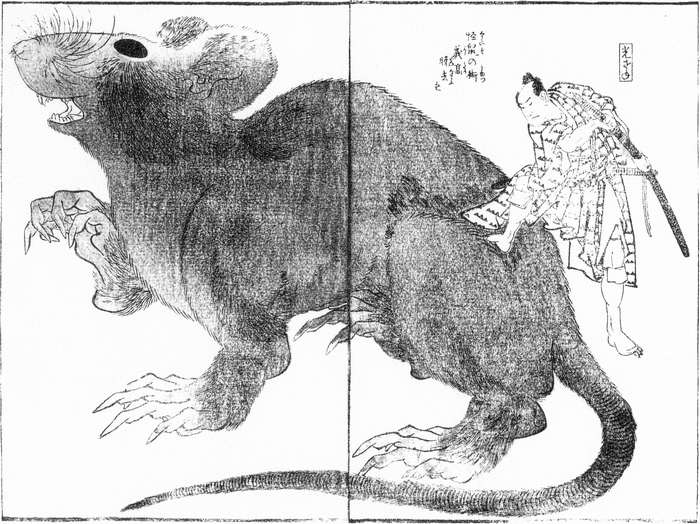
"Raigō Ajari Kaisoden" (頼豪阿闍梨恠鼠伝) by Takizawa Bakin and illustrated by Katsushika Hokusai. The big rat that appears in front of Nekoma Michizane is written in the text to be the size of about an ox, but the illustration exaggerates it and depicts it as a giant beast.。

Tesso (鉄鼠) is a Japanese yōkai related to the vengeful spirit (onryō) of the Heian period monk Raigō and a mouse. The name "tesso" is a name given by Toriyama Sekien in the Edo period collection of yōkai pictures, the Gazu Hyakki Yagyō, and this yōkai can also be called the Raigo-derived name Raigō-nezumi (頼豪鼠) as from the Enkyōhon (延慶本, alternatively read Enkeihon), a yomihon version of the Heike Monogatari, or Mii-dera-nezumi (三井寺鼠) derived from Mii-dera in Ōtsu, Shiga Prefecture as in the Edo period yōkai themed kyōka picture book, the Kyōka Hyaku Monogatari. They became known starting in the Heisei period from its adoption in the mystery novel Tesso no Ori (The Tesso's Cage) by Natsuhiko Kyogoku.

== Story ==
=== Heike Monogatari ===
According to the Heike Monogatari, in the Heian period, Raigō, on the basis of a promise with Emperor Shirakawa of receiving as much reward as desired if it had effect, continuously prayed for the birth of the emperor's crown prince, and in 1074 (in the Jōhō years) on December 16, it was finally succeeded. As a reward, Raigō requested for the construction of an ordination platform (kaidan) building for Mii-dera, but opposition forces from Enryaku-ji at Mount Hiei obstructed this and prevented it from being granted.

In resentment, Raigō then proceeded to make prayers to drag the crown prince who was born from his prayers, Prince Atsufumi, down to the clutches of evil, and went into a fast. After 100 days, Raigō ended up looking like an evil ogre and died, and starting since then, an ominous white-haired old priest would appear by Prince Atsufumi's pillowside. Emperor Shirakawa was fearful of Raigō's curse and grasped around for prayers, but they had no effect, and Prince Atsufumi died barely at the age of 4.

In the yomihon versions of the Heike Monogatari such as Enkyōhon (延慶本, alternatively read Enkeihon) and Nagatohon (長門本) and in the different book Genpei Jōsuiki, among other sources, the grudges of Raigō became a giant rat and ate away at the sacred books in Enryaku-ji. Enryaku-ji was fearful of Raigō's grudge and built a shrine at Higashisakamoto to enshrine Raigō as a god in order to quell this grudge. The name of the shrine has been passed down to be "Nezumi no Hokura" (鼠の秀倉, The Rat Shrine). It is also said that after this, large rats have been called "Raigo-nezumi."

=== Taiheiki ===
According to the military chronicle (Gunki monogatari) Taiheiki, the grudges of Raigō turned into 84,000 rats with stone bodies and metal teeth and climbed up Mount Hiei and ate away at not just the sacred texts, but also the Buddha statues.

=== Raigō Ajari Kaisoden ===
In the late Edo Period, the yomihon author Takizawa Bakin wrote Raigō Ajari Kaisoden (頼豪阿闍梨恠鼠伝) based on the Raigō legend. While the elegant Shimizu Yoshitaka (水義高, also known as Minamoto no Yoshitaka or 源義高), the orphan of Kiso no Yoshinaka was traveling across several provinces, Raigō appeared to him in a dream and talked about how because Yoshinaka once contributed a request form to Raigō's mini shrine (hokora) to become Seii Taishōgun, so he will offer his help to Yoshinaka, and told him about how Nekoma Michizane has been targeting his life due to having a grudge against him, and instructed Yoshinaka on some rat sorcerery.

In the story, the scene when Mitsuzane tried to cut down Yoshinaka and a giant rat appeared and stopped this, the scene when Yoshinaka called out an eerie person with the face of a rat in order to lure out his father's enemy Ishida Tamehisa, and the scene when Yoshinaka stopped Michizane's torture of his mother-in-law by summoning countless rats, among other scenes, were all given illustrations by the ukiyo-e artist Katsushika Hokusai.

== Historical background ==
In history, Raigō died in 1084 and Prince Atsufumi died in 1077, meaning that Raigō's death comes after Prince Atsufumi died, which is not consistent with the story, leading many specialists to posit that this legend is clearly made-up fiction.

However, certain parts, such as Mii-dera's request to the emperor for the construction of an ordination platform building, the prolonged declining of this request due to opposition from Enryaku-ji, and Raigō's efforts at getting this ordination platform building built, are seen as historical fact. Furthermore, according to the Jimon Denki Horoku (寺門伝記補録), the temple records of Mii-dera, as a result of the imperial court not approving the request to the emperor to build the ordination platform building, Raigō fell into gloom and did not leave the temple, resulting in a great rumble at the Shinra shrine at Mii-dera. Both Mii-dera and Enryaku-ji were in the Tendai sect, and after the death of the founder of the sect, Saichō, the sect split into two factions that engaged in violent disputes, and Enryaku-ji has had a history of being burned down several times as a result, so it is thought that this Tesso legend was born from the background of the confrontation between the two factions of the Tendai sect at that time.

Furthermore, stories in which not just metal rats (tesso), but also rats in general cause harm to people can be found in the Tōhoku region, the Nagano Prefecture, and other places all over Japan, but this is interpreted to be because in the past, rats did cause a lot of harm, and temples that held many books and sacred texts had some serious problems with rats causing damage, so there is the view that the existence of rats became the basis for legends about vengeful spirits and yōkai.

== Landmarks ==
The "Nezumi no Hokura" noted in the Heike Monogatari to be for calming the vengeful spirit of Raigō exists at the Hiyoshi Taisha in Sakamoto, Ōtsu, Shiga Prefecture. However the Keizai Zasshisha (神道秘密記) written in the Azuchi–Momoyama period at the Hiyoshi Taisha notes that the "Nezumi no Hokura" enshrines the Rat of the Twelve Earthly Branches. The way the Nezumi no Hokura is talked about in relation to Raigō is seen to be because as previously noted, rats were actually a source of misfortune bringing harm to people, or because Enryaku-ji was in the kimon (demon's gate) direction from Kyoto resulting in a lot of sorcerery activity in the past and Hiyoshi Taisha is there to protect against that, leading to legends about neutralizing vengeful spirits to take root.

It appears that the Nezumi no Hokura had already become famous by the Kamakura period, and in the Isetsu Hishō Kuden no Maki published in 1319 (in the Gen'ō era), there is the lyrics "At the base of Wagatatsusoma (meaning Mount Hiei) is a rat god, and by sounding its name once again, maybe it'll bring forth some good fortune" (さればや我立杣の麓にも鼠神といははれ給ひて、其名をあらたにとどめき、様々の奇瑞をなせりとか) and in the renga collection Tsukubashū compiled in the Nanboku-chō period, there are renga based on the Raigō legend such as "this is the rat around the mountain base" (塵にまじはる鼠とこそあれ) and "at our mountain, it is one of the gods worshipped" (我山にこれもあがむる神のうち), among others. Originally, this hokura (shrine) was told to be bringing benefit by warding off rats, but starting in the Shōwa and Heisei periods when anti-rat measures have started to become sufficient, it has gradually lost its role of warding off rats.

The Jūhachi Myōjin (十八明神) to the side of the stone steps at Mii-dera is also called "Nezumi no Miya" (Rat Palace), and it is said to pacify the spirit of the Tesso and others, and it is built facing the direction of Mount Hiei.

Another idea is that the Tesso was slain by a big cat who appeared because of the Buddhist power of a high priest at Mount Hiei, and towards the "Nezumi no Miya" at Mii-dera, there is the "Neko no Miya" (Cat Palace) deifying the big cat at Sakamoto in Sakamotogō, Shiga District, Ōmi Province, known to be the town in front of the Enryaku-ji gates, where it is built glaring in the direction of Mii-dera.

In a legend in Shimotsuke Province (now Tochigi Prefecture), it is told that 84,000 rats went around several provinces ravaging the fields, but when the rats tried to attack Shimotsuke, Shōgun Jizō (勝軍地蔵, general jizō) appeared and stopped this, and sealed them in a mound. According to "Oyama no Densetsu" (Legends of Oyama) by the Oyama City Area Cultural Research Society (小山市郷土文化研究会), this mount is the Atagozuka (愛宕塚) in Dotō, Oyama, and another name for it is "Raisozuka" (来鼠塚, Come Rat Mound) and it is said that within it is a cave where rats were sealed inside. It is also said that by taking a rock from on top of this mound and leaving it in a field, it can avoid any harm due to rats.

== See also ==
- List of legendary creatures from Japan
- Skaven (Warhammer)
- Splinter (Teenage Mutant Ninja Turtles)
- Wererat
