= Tenome =

Japanese mythical creature

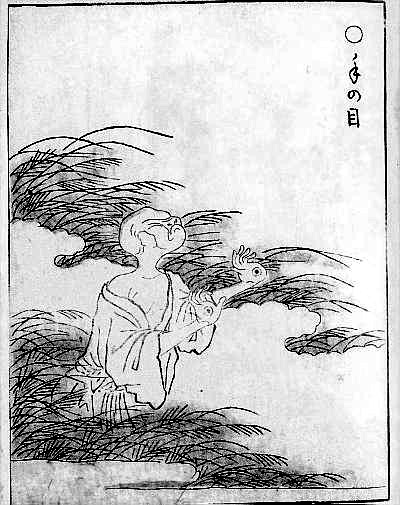
- "Tenome" from the Gazu Hyakki Yagyō by Toriyama Sekien

Creature information
- Sub grouping: Yōkai

Origin
- Country: Japan

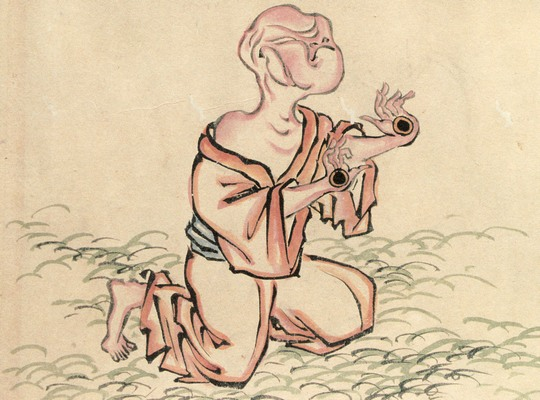
The "teme-bōzu," a yōkai modeled after the tenome, from the Hyakki Yagyō Emaki of the Matsui Library in Yatsuhiro, Kumamoto Prefecture

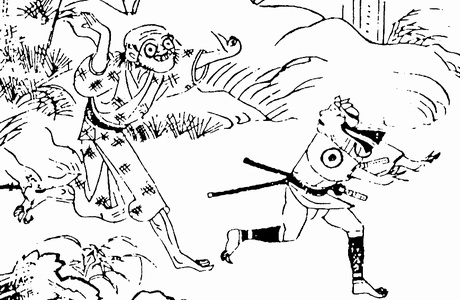
"Bakemono ni Hone wo Nukareshi Hito no Koto" (ばけ物に骨をぬかれし人の事), a kaidan (mysterious tale) considered to be based on the tenome, from the Shokoku Hyaku Monogatari. The man on the left has an eyeball on his left hand.

Tenome (手の目, eyes of hand, or rather hand eyes) is a Japanese yōkai that appeared in the Gazu Hyakki Yagyō by Toriyama Sekien.

== Concept ==
They appear as a zatō (a kind of member of the blind persons' guild such as the tōdōza or a ranking of members of related groups such the Anma, moxibustion practitions, and members of the biwa hōshi, among other organizations) with both eyes not on the face, but on the palm of each hand. There is no explanatory text in the Gazu Hyakki Yagyō so there are no details that can be known from it.

In the yōkai emaki, the Tenpō period Hyakki Yagyō Emaki of the Matsui Library in Yatsuhiro, Kumamoto Prefecture, is the label teme-bōzu (手目坊主, "eye-hand bonze") for a yōkai thought to have been inspired by Sekien's "tenome." The "Bakemonozukushi" (化物づくし) (owned by Kōichi Yumoto, designated Yumoto book B) also has a depiction of something that appears to be of the same design as Sekien's tenome. Both these examples have no explanatory text in the emaki so there are no details that can be known from them either. Also, Inui Yūhei depicted a yōkai called the "tenome" in an old illustrated manuscript currently owned by the Shisui Library (date of authorship unknown) where it was introduced with the words "are taru kusamura nado ni amatsuchi no seisei ni te shiyazu to ifu" (あれたる草村抔に天地のせいせいにて生ずと云, "these are said to be born from the grasses and grow from the land and sky."

In the collection of kaidan, the Edo-period Shokoku Hyaku Monogatari (1677), there is the setsuwa titled "Bakemono ni Hone wo Nukareshi Hito no Koto" (ばけ物に骨をぬかれし人の事, "How a Person Had Their Bones Removed by a Monster") illustrated with a yōkai that had an eye on each hand, and this monster is thought to have been designed based on Sekien's "tenome". This story goes as follows. Once, a man went on a trial of guts (or "test of courage") to the graveyard at Shichijogawara in Kyoto when a monster who appeared to be an old person around 80 years in age came after him, and this monster had eyeballs on each palm of the hand. The man fled into a nearby temple and after he made the monk there let him conceal himself in a nagamochi (a kind of chest), the monster chased after him, whereupon there was a sound like that of a dog sucking a bone, and after that it finally disappeared. It is said that when the monk opened up the nagamochi, the man was found to have all the bones in his body removed, his body reduced to just skin.

According to the Iwate no Yōkai Monogatari by Yoshio Fujisawa, in a certain legend told in the Iwate Prefecture, there is the following tale about the tenome. A certain traveler was walking along the plains at night when a blind person approached. This blind person had an eyeball on each palm of the hand, and these eyes seemed to be looking for something. The traveler ran away out of surprise, and rushed into an inn. After telling the owner of the inn what had happened, the owner answered that in a certain place a few days ago, a blind person was killed and robbed by a scoundrel, and the blind person wanted to have at least one look at the face of those scoundrels, if not with regular eyes, at least with eyes on the hands, and this grievance led the blind person to become a "tenome" yōkai, and similarly in Echigo, it is said that a tenome had appeared after a blind man was killed.

The yōkai researcher Katsumi Tada gives the interpretation that these drawings of the yōkai "tenome" and others are a word play on the phrase "bake no kawa ga hageru" (an expression meaning "to give away/reveal one's true character", literally meaning "to peel off one's layer of disguise"). The scene of eyes on a raised hand would represent the famous expression "teme o ageru" (literally "to raise one's hand-eye") meaning to reveal one's tricks and ruses, and a bonze's head would mean both "hageru" (which has a second meaning, "to grow bald") and the phrase "bōzu ni naru" (an expression that means "to lose in a match", literally "to become a bonze"). He explains that the background of the "tenome" in the Gazu Hyakki Yagyō has a moon and a field of susuki, so the whole drawing is telling a joke with the moon indicating the bōzu (meaning "bonze" or "baldie") card in hanafuda (bōzu is an alternate name for the August suit) and the susuki being a reference to the kotowaza phrase "yūrei no shōtai mitari kare-obana" ("look at the ghost's true identity, it's a withered obana"), an expression about being so paranoid that anything, even withered obana (an alternate name for susuki), might seem like ghosts.

== Kurayami me ==
As a yōkai similar to the tenome, there is the "kurayami me" (darkness eye) written about in the yōkai explanatory book Yōkai Majin Seirei no Sekai (1977) by Norio Yamada. It states that these have eyes on the front of each knee, and they can easily walk around in the dark but often bump into things in the daytime.

== In popular culture ==
- Pan's Labyrinth (El laberinto del Fauno, "Faun's Labyrinth"): In the Spanish movie directed by Guillermo del Toro, the main character (Ofelia) is given a second task which consists in retrieving an ornate dagger from the lair of a character known as "the Pale Man", which resembles the Tenome.
- Release from Agony: The cover of this album by Destruction depicts a Tenome hooked up to an IV.
- Aaahh!!! Real Monsters: One of the main characters, Krumm, is loosely based on the creature.
- Cuphead: The Blind Specter, the first of several bosses fought during the Phantom Express stage, is based on the Tenome.
- The Tenome appears as a monster in Pathfinder Roleplaying Game, first featured in Adventure Path #99, Hell's Rebels, part 3 of 6: Dance of the Damned.
- In Skylanders, the light villain Eye-Five is based on Tenome.
- in Demon Slayer, the demon Yahaba is based on Tenome.

== See also ==
- Hamsa
