= Umi zatō =

Japanese yōkai

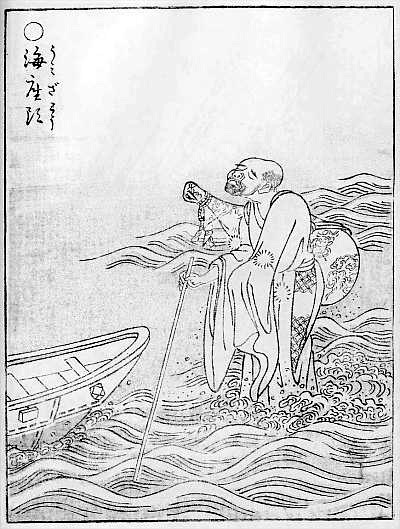
Umi zatō from the Gazu Hyakki Yagyō by Toriyama Sekien

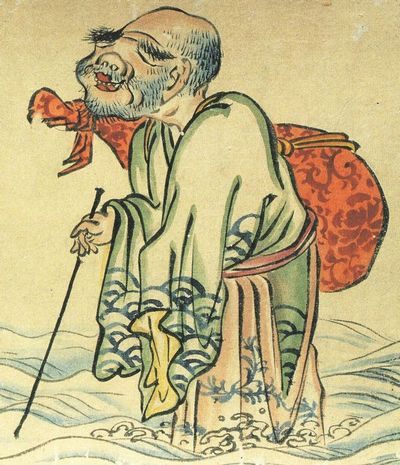
Umi zatō from the Hyakki Yagyō Emaki of the Matsui Library in Yatsuhiro, Kumamoto Prefecture

Umi zatō (海座頭) is a Japanese yōkai, or supernatural being, in the Gazu Hyakki Yagyō by Toriyama Sekien and in various emakimono such as the Matsui Library's Hyakki Yagyō Emaki.

== Overview ==
In yōkai depictions, they are depicted looking like a giant biwa hōshi standing above the sea holding a rod in the right hand and carrying a pipa on their back. There is no accompanying explanatory text in the Gazu Hyakki Yagyō or Hyakki Yagyō Emaki, so it is unknown what kind of yōkai this was intended to be. The yōkai researcher Murakami Kenji considers it a yōkai that has existed only in these paintings.

In books published in the postwar era, there has been the interpretation that this is a kind of umibōzu, which frequently appear off the coast of Sanriku, Rikuchū Province (now Iwate prefecture). Although they are counted among the umibōzu, their times of appearance are different, appearing at the times when umibōzu no longer appear, often at the end of the month. They walk around on top of the water, threaten fishermen and beckon ships to make them capsize, and sometimes even swallow ships whole. There is also the theory that they appear above the sea taking on the appearance of a zatō (a kind of member of the blind persons' guild such as the tōdōza or a ranking of members of related groups such the Anma, moxibustion practitioners, and members of the biwa hōshi, among other organizations) to frighten people. However, it is said that if the umi zatō's words are answered properly, then it will go away.
