= Yanari =

Phenomenon in Japanese folklore

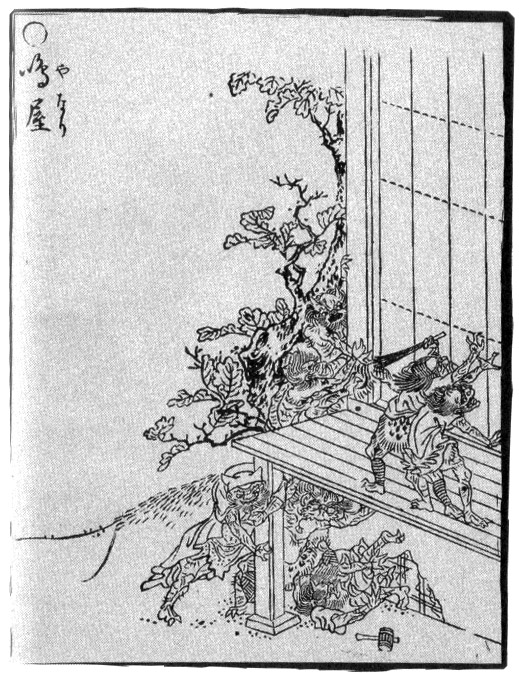
"Yanari" (鳴屋) from the Gazu Hyakki Yagyō by Toriyama Sekien

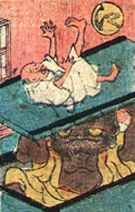
The illustrated card "En no Shita kara Deru Tatamiage no Kuwai" (えんの下から出るたたみあげのくわい, "Mysterious Thing That Lifts Up Tatami from Beneath the Edges") from Yōkai Karuta, depicting the yanari legend of Tajima Province.

Yanari (家鳴, 家鳴り, 鳴家, or 鳴屋, literally "house creak") is a paranormal phenomenon told about in legends in various places in Japan where the house or furniture would start shaking for no reason.

In the Gazu Hyakki Yagyō by Toriyama Sekien, there is a depiction of a small oni-like yōkai doing a prank shaking the house causing a yanari, but in modern times they are interpreted to be the same as poltergeist phenomena.

Also, squeaking sounds made by a house's materials that happen as a result of changes in temperature and humidity are also nowadays called "yanari." They often occur in newly built houses where the materials have not yet been there for long, and in worse cases it can result in defective housing causing trouble for the construction company and homeowner.

== Legends ==
In the Taihei Hyakumonogatari, Edo Period
In the Edo period, Tajima Province (now, northern Hyōgo Prefecture). A certain group rōnin went on a test of courage and visited a house known to be haunted.
While staying up the whole night, the entire house started violently shaking. The rōnin thought it was an earthquake and left the house, but the only thing shaking was the house. This strange phenomenon occurred the next day too, so the group of rōnin went to consult a monk named Tomohisa, and they all went to go stay at that house together.
The night Tomohisa stayed there with all those rōnin, the house started shaking. Tomohisa stared at the tatami and stabbed at the most violently shaking area with a dagger. After doing so, the shaking stopped completely.
When it becomes morning and they investigated the house, they found a tomb engraved "Nataguma Seigan Reii" (刃熊青眼霊位, "Blade-Bear Blue-eye Spirit's Spot"), and from the 眼 character the dagger was stabbed into, blood had come out. When the story was related to the locals, they were told about how in the past, there was a bear that wildly ran around the area and the man living in that house killed it, and the tomb was built in order to quell its curse, but he was still haunted by the bear's spirit and died, and ever after that the spirit had wandered around the house causing many strange paranormal phenomena.
Occurrence mentioned in a November 22 article in Meiji 34 or 1901 in the daily newspaper Niroku Shinbō
It was Meiji 33 or 1900, January. In a tenement house of the village of Omote in Honjo Ward of Tokyo Prefecture (now Sumida, Tokyo), Kageyama Jōsaku's wife Chiu gave birth to their first daughter. The next year, a second daughter was born but died two days after birth. The first daughter suddenly died after that in seven days. Four-sevens (twenty-eight) days after that, Chiu died. From all these misfortunes one after another, Jōsaku fell behind in expenses and went into debt, and his many creditors confiscated his furniture and household goods one after another. Jōsaku wept and wept, and then was never seen.
After that, the tenement house would, at night on the third quarter of the hour of the ox, make yanari sounds, so the residents considered moving away to other lands. It is rumored that the origin of this yanari is the deeds of the vengeful spirits (onryō) of the three family members that Jōsaku lost.

== See also ==
- List of legendary creatures from Japan
