= List of legendary creatures from Japan =

The following is a list of Akuma (demons), Yūrei (ghosts), Yōkai (spirits), Kami and other legendary creatures that are notable in Japanese folklore and mythology.

== A ==
Abumi-guchi
A small furry tsukumogami formed from the stirrup of a mounted soldier who fell in battle, it typically stays put and awaits its creator's return, unaware of said soldier's death.
Abura-akago
An infant ghost that licks the oil out of andon lamps.
Abura-sumashi
A large-headed spirit that lives in the mountain passes of Kumamoto Prefecture, thought to be the reincarnation of a person who stole oil and then fled into the woods.
Agubanba (あぐばんば, lit. 'ash crone')
A blind, cannibalistic female yōkai who hails from Akita Prefecture. She mainly targets young women who have just come of age. Also known as Agubanba (灰坊主, lit. 'ash shaver').
Ahiratsu-hime
The daughter of Hosuseri and the first wife of Emperor Jimmu, though she was not made Empress and her children would not inherit the throne. Her son Tagishimimi tried to seize power from his half-brother Emperor Suizei but failed and was killed for it.
Ajisukitakahikone
One of the sons of Ōkuninushi, the brother of Kotoshironushi and Takeminakata, and the father of Takitsuhiko. He is the tutelary deity of the city of Kamo in Niigata Prefecture and his father was the original ruler of the earth until the amatsukami sent Ninigi-no-Mikoto down from Takamagahara to replace him.
Akabeko
A red cow involved in the construction of the Enzō-ji temple in Yanaizu, Fukushima.
Aka Manto
A ghost in a red or blue mantle that offers either red or blue toilet paper rolls in bathrooms, then kills whoever answers based on their choice: flaying for red, strangulation for blue.
Akaname
A spirit that licks off filth in untidy bathrooms.
Akashita
A hairy-faced creature with clawed hands and a large red tongue that looms in a black cloud over a floodgate belonging to someone who took more than their fair share of irrigation water during a drought.
Akateko
A red child's hand dangling from a tree in the city of Hachinohe in Aomori Prefecture, accompanied by a hypnotically beautiful woman standing beneath the tree to lure people into its occasionally-deadly grasp.
Akkorokamui
A giant Ainu monster resembling an octopus, which supposedly lurks in Uchiura Bay in Hokkaido.
Akubōzu
A spirit that lives in the ashes of hearths in Akita Prefecture and Iwate Prefecture and appears when someone plays with the ashes.
Akugyo
A species of man-eating sea monster that resembles a giant fish, found in the seas near Kibi Province.
Akuma
A general term for the worst of the worst demons and devils, the Japanese Christian term for the Devil, and the Japanese Buddhist term for the Mara.
Akurojin-no-hi
A ghostly fire from Mie Prefecture that appears on rainy nights and gravely sickens those who do not flee from it.
Amabie
A Japanese mermaid yōkai that emerged from the sea to give a prophecy of either an epidemic or a bountiful harvest and instructed that its likeness be hung in various places for good luck. It saw a surge in popularity during the COVID pandemic.
Amaburakosagi
A ritual-disciplinary demon from Shikoku whose purpose is to scare naughty children into behaving.
Amamehagi
A ritual-disciplinary demon from the Hokuriku region whose purpose is to scare naughty children into behaving.
Ama no Fuchigoma
A horse ridden by the god Susanoo.
Ama-no-Iwato
The name of the cave Amaterasu hid herself in after Susanoo drove her away by vandalizing her rice fields and throwing a flayed horse at her loom, which killed one of her maidens, due to a quarrel the two had been having. Ame-no-Uzume lured her back out with the help of the mirror Yata-no-Kagami, and Ame-no-Tajikarao sealed the cave so she couldn't go back in.
Amanojaku
A minor demon that tempts people to perform evil acts, most famously told of in the tale of Uriko-hime.
Amanozako
A monstrous goddess mentioned in the Kujiki, born from Susanoo's ferocious spirit (his ara-mitama) when he vomited it forth to expel it. She is said to be an ancestor deity for all short-tempered, disobedient yōkai.
Amaterasu
The Shinto sun goddess, sister of Susanoo the storm god and Tsukuyomi the moon god. She is the ancestor of the Imperial line and is often considered the chief kami of the Shinto pantheon.
Amatsuhikone
The third son of Amaterasu, believed to be the ancestor of several clans, including the Oshikochi clan and the Yamashiro clan.
Amatsukami
The heavenly kami, who were either born in or dwell in Takamagahara, as opposed to the kunitsukami who dwell on earth.
Ama-Tsu-Mara
The kami of ironworking and blacksmiths, who helped Ishikori-dome no Mikoto forge the mirror Yata-no-Kagami.
Amatsu-Mikaboshi
A rebellious or malevolent Shinto god, who was subdued by Takemikazuchi. Some say he was born from Kagu-tsuchi's blood.
Amazake-babaa
An old woman spirit from Miyagi Prefecture and Aomori Prefecture who comes late at night and asks for sweet sake in a childish voice, bringing disease (usually smallpox or the common cold) to whoever answers, unless a cedar branch is placed in the doorway to repel her.
Amefurikozō
A little boy spirit who plays in the rain, believed by some to be a child servant of the Chinese rain god Ushi.
Amemasu
A lake-dwelling Ainu creature resembling a giant fish or whale that is known for sinking ships and sometimes taking the form of a beautiful woman to lure sailors to their deaths.
Ame-no-Fuyukinu
The son of Omizunu and the father of Ōkuninushi. Susanoo ordered him to deliver the sword Kusanagi-no-Tsurugi to Amaterasu in Takamagahara to settle an old grievance between them.
Amenohoakari
A kami of sun and agriculture, the son of Ame-no-oshihomimi and Takuhadachiji-hime, the older brother of Ninigi-no-Mikoto and the ancestor of the Mononobe clan, among others. He is sometimes known as Nigihayahi.
Ame no Hohi
The second son of Amaterasu, sent to earth to rule after his older brother Ame-no-oshihomimi refused. Some say he was the father of Ame no Wakahiko. The amatsukami didn't hear from him for three years, so another kami was sent to rule. He is the ancestor of the Haji clan, the Izumo clan and the Sugawara clan, among others.
Ame-no-Koyane
The ancestral kami of the Nakatomi clan, and of Fujiwara no Kamatari, the founder of the powerful Fujiwara clan. He is a son of Kamimusubi and the father of Tamakushi-hime. Amaterasu made him guardian of the mirror Yata-no-Kagami and he was put in charge of divine affairs of the Imperial Palace.
Ame-no-Minakanushi
The first, or one of the first gods to manifest when the heavens and the earth came into existence. He is a hitorigami and one of the five kotoamatsukami.
Ame-no-Nuboko
The spear Izanagi and Izanami used to create the primordial landmass Onogoroshima. It is often depicted as a naginata.
Ame-no-ohabari
A kami who is also a sword, specifically the sword Izanagi used to kill Kagu-tsuchi after his birth killed Izanami. He is said to be the father of Takemikazuchi via the spilled blood of Kagu-tsuchi.
Ame-no-oshihomimi
The first son of Amaterasu, husband of Takuhadachiji-hime and father of Ninigi-no-Mikoto and Amenohoakari. He was created in a kami-making competition between her and her brother Susanoo, and was offered rulership of the earth, but refused.
Ame-no-Tajikarao
The kami of power, known for his immense physical and brute strength. He sealed the cave Amaterasu had hidden herself in after she had been lured back out by Ame-no-Uzume.
Ame-no-ukihashi
A floating bridge that connects the heavens (Takamagahara) and the earth, guarded by Sarutahiko Ōkami. It is said that this is where Izanagi and Izanami stood when they gave form to the world by creating the primordial landmass Onogoroshima using the spear Ame-no-Nuboko. It is also said by some that the bridge has since collapsed, with its remains forming the area west of Kyoto. Others say it is still there, but is only visible to those whose mind and heart are free from foreign influence.
Ame-no-Uzume
The kami of dawn, mirth, meditation, revelry and the arts. With the help of the mirror Yata-no-Kagami, she lured Amaterasu back out of the cave she had hidden herself in after Susanoo drove her away by vandalizing her rice fields and throwing a flayed horse at her loom, which killed one of her maidens, due to a quarrel the two had been having.
Ame no Wakahiko
A kami of grains who was sent to earth to either rule it or look for Ame no Hohi, who some say was his father. The amatsukami didn't hear from him for eight years, so they sent a bird down as a messenger to him. He slew it with an arrow that went all the way to Heaven, which was thrown back by either Amaterasu or Takamimusubi, killing him.
Ameonna
A female spirit who is known for calling forth rain.
Amikiri
A bird-headed, crustacean-armed, snake-bodied spirit that cuts fishing nets and mosquito netting.
Amorōnagu
A tennyo from the island of Amami Ōshima in Kagoshima Prefecture, who is said to bathe in pools and waterfalls in ravines.
Anmo
A ritual-disciplinary demon from Iwate Prefecture whose purpose is to scare naughty children into behaving.
Aoandon
The demonic spirit which arises from an andon lamp at the end of a Hyakumonogatari Kaidankai.
Aobōzu
A blue monk spirit who sometimes kidnaps children, depending on the tale.
Aonyōbō
A female ghost who lurks in an abandoned Imperial palace, waiting for visitors who never arrive, and even if they did, she would kill and devour them for not being the person she's waiting for.
Aosaginohi
A black-crowned night heron of great age, that has become a yōkai and now shines an iridescent blue at night and exhales a glowing golden dust. It retains a normal heron's shyness and flees from people, so it is rarely seen.
Arikura-no-baba
An old woman with magical powers, hailing from the city of Takayama in Gifu Prefecture.
Ashihara no Nakatsukuni
The land between Takamagahara and Yomi, eventually the term for the country and location of Japan.
Ashi-magari
A usually-invisible spirit from Kagawa Prefecture that entangles the legs of travelers at night and is often believed to be the work of tanuki.
Ashinagatenaga
A pair of characters from Kyūshū, one with long legs and the other with long arms.
Ashinazuchi and Tenazuchi
Children of Ōyamatsumi and the parents of Kushinadahime, whom Susanoo saved from the Yamata-no-Orochi and later married. They are the grandparents of Yashimajinumi, which makes them ancestors of Ōkuninushi.
Atago Gongen
A kami and tengu believed to be an avatar of the Buddhist bodhisattva Jizō and Izanami, worshiped as a protector against fire and as a god of war and victory by samurai.
Ayakashi
A general term for yōkai that appear on or above the surface of a body of water.
Azukiarai/Azukitogi
A spirit that washes azuki beans on the shoreline of a river or other body of water.
Azukibabaa
An old woman yōkai who grinds azuki beans but would much rather devour a person.
Azukihakari
A yōkai that is only sound, like a poltergeist. It makes the sound of red beans being sown on the floor in the house it haunts, gradually becoming louder.
Azumi-no-isora
A kami of the seashore, considered to be the ancestor of the Azumi people.

== B ==
Bake-kujira
A ghostly whale skeleton that drifts along the coastline of Shimane Prefecture, accompanied by strange birds and fish as it seeks to avenge its slain kin by cursing whalers and those who eat whale meat with plagues and fire.
Bakeneko
A shapeshifting cat spirit, different from the nekomata in that it doesn't have two tails and is marginally less malevolent.
Bakezōri
A straw sandal (zōri) that has come to life as a tsukumogami and now causes a ruckus at night.
Bakotsu
A demonic flaming skeletal horse that is believed to be the spirit of a horse that died in a fire.
Baku
A supernatural beast that resembles a tapir and devours dreams and nightmares.
Basan
A large chicken monster from Iyo Province that breathes cold fire that does not burn, named for the eerie rustling sound its wings make when it flaps them.
Bashō no sei
The spirit of a banana tree that takes human form.
Benzaiten
The goddess of financial fortune, talent, beauty and music. As such she is the patron of artists, geisha, writers, dancers and others. One of the Seven Lucky Gods.
Betobeto-san
An invisible spirit which follows people at night, making the sound of footsteps.
Binbōgami
A spirit that brings poverty and other such misery unless placated with baked miso.
Bishamonten
Better known as Vaiśravaṇa. The god of fortune in war and battles, also associated with authority and dignity, protector of those who follow the rules and behave accordingly. He is also a protector of holy sites. One of the Seven Lucky Gods.
Biwa-bokuboku
A biwa that has come to life as a tsukumogami and now sings and plays itself at night.
Boroboroton
A futon that has come to life as a tsukumogami and now comes to life at night to try to kill the person sleeping on it by throwing them out of bed before wrapping around their head and neck with the intent to smother and strangle.
Buruburu
An invisible spirit that clings to people, inducing cowardice and shivering.
Byakko
The Japanese version of the Chinese White Tiger of the West.
Byōbunozoki
A tsukumogami that emerges from byōbu to spy on people.

== C ==
Chimimōryō
A general term for monsters of the mountains and rivers.
Chōchinbi
Demonic flames (onibi) which resemble paper lanterns and appear in the footpaths between rice fields, but disappear whenever somebody gets too close.
Chōchin'obake
A chōchin lantern monster that is sometimes considered a tsukumogami.

== D ==
Daidarabotchi
A giant responsible for creating the geographical features of Japan as it moves and sleeps.
Daikokuten
The god of commerce and prosperity, sometimes considered a patron of cooks, farmers and bankers, and a protector of crops. He is also considered a demon hunter. One of the Seven Lucky Gods.
Daitengu
The wisest, most powerful tengu, each of whom resembles a red-skinned old man with a long nose and lives on a separate mountain. The wisest, most powerful daitengu of all is Sōjōbō of Mount Kurama, the king and god of all tengu.
Danzaburou-danuki
A bake-danuki from Sado Island. One of the three most famous tanuki.
Datsue-ba
An old woman in the Underworld who removes the clothes (or skin, if unclothed) of the dead and gives them to Keneō to be weighed, so that judgment may be passed.
Dodomeki
A woman who was cursed to have long arms covered in bird's eyes due to her habit of stealing money.
Dōnotsura
A headless humanoid yōkai with its face on its torso.
Dōsojin
The generic name for a type of Shinto guardian or spirit, considered to be the deities of borders and paths.Also the japanese version of the Liminal deity

== E ==
Ebisu
The god of prosperity and wealth in business, and of abundance in crops, cereals and food in general. He is a patron of fishermen and one of the Seven Lucky Gods, and one of Izanagi and Izanami's first children, though they disowned him for being deformed.
Enenra
A vaguely humanoid monster made of smoke and darkness that emerges from bonfires but is generally only visible to the pure of heart.
Enkō
The word for kappa of Shikoku and western Honshu.

== F ==
Fūjin
The Shinto wind god, brother of Raijin the thunder god. They were unleashed upon the world when Izanagi fled Yomi.
Fukurokuju
The god of wisdom, luck, longevity, wealth and happiness. One of the Seven Lucky Gods, though he is sometimes omitted in favor of Kisshōten.
Funayūrei
The angry ghosts of people who died at sea, who now seek to sink ships to have the living join them.
Furaribi
A birdlike creature engulfed in flames that flies aimlessly, thought to be the restless spirits of those not given a proper burial.
Fūri
A monkey-like Chinese yōkai that can glide from tree to tree.
Furutsubaki-no-rei
A camellia tree of great age, that has become evil and now sucks people's souls out if they come too close to it.
Furu-utsubo
The discarded quiver of a slain archer, that has come to life as a tsukumogami.
Futakuchi-onna
A ghostly woman with a second mouth on the back of her head, that whispers to the woman and clamors to be fed, or feeds itself using the woman's hair, which has become prehensile.
Futodama
A kami of rituals, oracles and divination, and a legendary ancestor of the Inbe clan. He is a son of Takamimusubi, the brother of Omoikane and Takuhadachiji-hime, and the father of Kamotaketsunumi no Mikoto. He was also involved in getting Amateratsu out of Ama-no-Iwato, which is the name of the cave she hid herself in after Susanoo drove her away by vandalizing her rice fields and throwing a flayed horse at her loom, which killed one of her maidens, due to a quarrel the two had been having.
Futsunushi
A kami of swords and warfare, the general of Amaterasu, a legendary ancestor of the Mononobe clan and a tutelary deity of the Fujiwara clan. He is closely associated with Takemikazuchi and the two are often worshipped together.

== G ==
Gagoze
A demon known for having attacked young priests at Gangō-ji temple in Nara Prefecture.
Gaki
The perpetually-starving ghosts of people who were especially greedy in life.
Gashadokuro
A giant skeleton that is the spirit of the dead left unburied after a sufficiently large disaster. Also known as gaikotsu.
Genbu
The Japanese version of the Chinese Black Tortoise of the North.
Goryō
The vengeful spirits of dead nobles and martyrs.
Gozu and Mezu
Two notable guards of the Underworld, one with an ox's head and the other with a horse's face.
Gozu Tennō
A deity of disease and healing, credited both with causing epidemics and protecting against them.
Guhin
Another name for tengu.
Gyūki
Another name for ushi-oni.

== H ==
Hachiman
The kami of archery and war, who is actually the deified Emperor Ōjin, son of Empress Jingū.
Hakanohi
A ghostly fire which sprouts from the base of graves.
Hakuja no Myōjin
A white serpent deity.
Hakutaku
A yak-like beast which handed down knowledge on harmful spirits.
Hakuzōsu
The name of a kitsune who is famous for pretending to be a Buddhist priest.
Hanako-san
The spirit of a young World War II-era girl who inhabits and haunts elementary school restrooms.
Haniyasu-hiko and Haniyasu-hime
Two kami of earth, clay and pottery, either born from Izanami and Izanagi after Japan was made, or from Izanami's feces as she died from giving birth to Kagu-tsuchi.
Hannya
A Noh mask representing a jealous female demon.
Haradashi
A humanoid creature with a giant face on its stomach, that enjoys making people laugh with zany antics.
Harionago
A woman from Ehime Prefecture with a thornlike barb on the tip of each strand of her long prehensile hair, which she uses to ensnare and attack men who dare to smile back at her when she smiles at them.
Hashihime
A woman whose jealousy turned her into an evil spirit, associated with a particular bridge in the city of Uji in Kyoto Prefecture.
Heikegani
Crabs with human faces on their shells, said to be the spirits of the warriors killed in the Battle of Dan-no-ura.
Hibagon
The Japanese version of Bigfoot or the Yeti, sighted on Mount Hiba in Hiroshima Prefecture.
Hiderigami
Chinese spirits said to bring droughts.
Hihi
A baboon-like Chinese yōkai.
Himetataraisuzu-hime
The daughter of either Kotoshironushi or Ōmononushi and the second wife of Emperor Jimmu, who became Empress and gave birth to the second Emperor, Emperor Suizei.
Hikeshibaba
An old woman spirit who extinguishes lanterns so that the more light-hating yōkai can come out and cause trouble.
Hinezumi
A rat or mouse with fireproof fur that dwells in the flames of an ever-burning tree deep in the mountains of southern China.
Hinode
The moment of dawn, when the material world and the spirit world overlap as the night-things retreat until dusk comes.
Hitobashira
A type of human sacrifice, where a person is buried alive in the foundation of a new building to bring good luck.
Hitodama
A fireball ghost that appears when someone dies, signifying the dead person's spirit.
Hito-gitsune
A type of spirit possession told of in the Chūgoku region.
Hitorigami
A term for kami who came into being alone, as opposed to those who came into being as male-female pairs. They are exclusively male.
Hitotsume-kozō
A bald child spirit with a single eye like a cyclops.
Hitotsume-nyūdō
A monk spirit with a single eye like a cyclops.
Hiyoribō
A spirit from Ibaraki Prefecture which stops rainfall and creates good weather.
Hoderi
The eldest son of Ninigi-no-Mikoto and Konohanasakuya-hime, a kami of the sea's bounty and the brother of Hoori. His lost fishhook led to his brother meeting Toyotama-hime, and he eventually swore to serve his brother forever after losing a fight between the two. He is also the ancestor of the Hayato people.
Hoji
The wicked spirit of Tamamo-no-Mae, released upon the discovery of her true nature as a kitsune, it was hunted down on the plains of Nasu and became the Sesshō-seki.
Hone-onna
A skeleton woman who seeks a man's love but brings death to her lover, as related in the story Botan Dōrō, whose ghostly subject is one of the three most famous onryō.
Hō-ō
The legendary Fènghuáng bird of China, that rules over all other birds.
Hoori
The youngest son of Ninigi-no-Mikoto and Konohanasakuya-hime, who married Toyotama-hime and became the grandfather of Emperor Jimmu.
Hoshi no Tama
A ball guarded by a kitsune (fox spirit) which can give the one who obtains it power to force the kitsune to help them. It is said to hold some reserves of the kitsune's power.
Hōsōshi
A four-eyed, sword-wielding ritual exorcist who leads funeral processions and expels evil spirits.
Hosuseri
The second child of Ninigi-no-Mikoto and Konohanasakuya-hime, about whom little is said, save that he is the great-uncle of Emperor Jimmu and the father of Ahiratsu-hime.
Hotei
Better known as Budai. The god of fortune, guardian of children, patron of diviners and barmen, and also the god of popularity. One of the Seven Lucky Gods.
Hotoke
A Buddhist term used to denote a deceased person, among other meanings.
Huri or Hure cikap
Monstrous "Red Bird[s]" of Ainu lore.
Hyakki Yakō
A parade of ghosts, spirits and demons that takes place at night.
Hyakume
A fleshy spirit with a hundred staring yellow eyes, somewhat superficially resembling the nuppeppō. It haunts abandoned temples, shrines and other shadowy places and guards against intruders. When an intruder comes, one of the creature's eyes detaches from its body and flies over to the intruder and attaches itself so the creature can watch what the intruder does. When the intruder leaves, the eye returns to its owner.
Hyōsube
A hairy, nocturnal kappa variant from Kyūshū that dwells in underwater caves and prefers eggplants over cucumbers.

== I ==
Ibaraki-dōji
The name of a particularly famous oni subordinate of Shuten-dōji.
Ichiren-bozu
Prayer beads that have come to life as a tsukumogami.
Ikiryō
Essentially a living ghost, as it is a living person's soul outside of their body. The opposite of shiryō.
Ikuchi
A huge, very long sea serpent that travels over boats in a long, slow arc while dripping copious amounts of a thick, viscous oil, encountered off the coast of Hitachi Province.
Ikutsuhikone
The fourth son of Amaterasu, born from a kami-making contest between her and her brother. Some say he is Susanoo's son instead.
Inari Ōkami
The kami of foxes, fertility, rice, tea and sake, agriculture and industry, and general prosperity and worldly success.
Inugami
A dog-spirit created, worshipped, and employed by a family via sorcerous animal cruelty.
Inugami Gyōbu
The name of a bake-danuki from Matsuyama in Iyo Province.
Isetsuhiko
An obscure wind kami spoken of in Harima Province and Ise Province.
Ishikori-dome no Mikoto
The kami of mirrors, who, along with the blacksmith deity Ama-Tsu-Mara, made the mirror Yata no Kagami that helped lure Amaterasu out of the Ama-no-Iwato cave and returned light to the world. For this she is worshipped by stonecutters and mirror makers and is revered as the deity of casting and metalworking.
Ishinagenjo
A maritime phenomenon near Nagasaki Prefecture, Enoshima and Saga Prefecture where there is a great splash near a ship, as if a huge boulder had been thrown into the sea, yet there is no boulder to be seen.
Isonade
A giant shark-like sea monster with a barb-covered tail, sighted off the coast of Western Japan.
Issie
A lake creature similar to the Loch Ness Monster, found in Lake Ikeda on Kyūshū.
Itsumade
An eerie fire-breathing reptilian bird monster with an almost human face, named for its cry.
Ittan-momen
A roll of cotton from Kagoshima Prefecture that has come to life as a tsukumogami and now attempts to smother people by wrapping itself around their faces.
Iwanaga-hime
A daughter of Ōyamatsumi and sister of Konohanasakuya-hime and Konohanachiru-hime. She and Konohanasakuya-hime were offered to Ninigi-no-Mikoto as wives, but he rejected her on account of her appearance, which led to Ōyamatsumi cursing him and his descendants with short lives and mortality.
Iwasaku and Nesaku
Two minor star kami born from the blood of Kagu-tsuchi, worshipped in the northern Kantō region.
Iyaya
A woman who looks attractive from behind but has the face of an old man when seen from the front.
Izanagi
A kami known as the first man, brother-husband of the first woman, Izanami. Together they created Japan, and all the kami who came after owe their lives to them in one way or another.
Izanami
A kami known as the first woman, sister-wife of the first man, Izanagi. She died giving birth to Kagu-tsuchi and now rules Yomi.

== J ==
Jami
A wicked mountain spirit.
Janjanbi
Drifting fireballs from Nara Prefecture, named for the sound they make and considered a type of onibi.
Jatai
A folding-screen cloth that has come to life as a tsukumogami.
Jibakurei
A type of ghost that is bound to a specific place or situation.
Jigoku
The Japanese Buddhist version of Hell, where the freshly dead go after receiving judgment from Datsue-ba and Keneō. They pay for their sins there, then await reincarnation.
Jikininki
Ghosts of evil people, that have been condemned to eat human corpses.
Jinmenju
A tree with flowers that resemble human heads, that smile and laugh even as their petals fall and they wilt like any normal flower.
Jinmenken
Human-faced dogs mentioned in Japanese urban legends.
Jinushigami
The kami of a particular area of land. They may be either ancestors of the original settlers of an area, or ancestors of a clan.
Jishin-namazu
A giant catfish dwelling beneath the earth, near the kaname-ishi, the rock that holds down the Japanese archipelago, which causes earthquakes and tsunamis when it moves, despite being restrained by Takemikazuchi. It was blamed during the Ansei earthquake and tsunami.
Jorōgumo
A spider yōkai that shapeshifts into an attractive woman to lure men in as prey.
Jubokko
A vampiric tree that grows on old battlefields and ensnares those who come too close to it in order to drain their blood with sharp, hollow branches.
Jurōjin
A god with the form of an old man, associated with the elderly and longevity. One of the Seven Lucky Gods.

== K ==
Kagu-tsuchi
A kami of fire, whose birth killed his mother Izanami, sending her to Yomi and creating the concept of Death, which enraged his father Izanagi into beheading him and cutting him into eight pieces, which created eight volcanoes. Some say Amatsu-Mikaboshi was born from his blood, along with numerous other kami.
Kahaku (河伯)
Another word for kappa.
Kaibyō
Supernatural cats, the most prominent of which are the bakeneko and the nekomata, along with the maneki-neko in some cases.
Kakurezato
Villages hidden deep in the mountains, where the inhabitants live peacefully and without conflict. Only those especially good of heart may stumble upon kakurezato, but cannot revisit upon leaving.
Kamaitachi
The slashing sickle-clawed weasel that haunts the mountains of the Kōshin'etsu region and rides dust devils to travel.
Kambarinyūdō
A monk spirit that spies on people while they are using the toilet.
Kameosa
A sake jar that has come to life as a tsukumogami.
Kami
A general term for gods and spirits in the Shinto religion.
Kamikiri
A yōkai that secretly cuts the hair on people's heads.
Kamimusubi
The third of the first beings to come into existence when the heavens and the earth took shape, he planted the first grains after either Susanoo or Tsukuyomi slew Ukemochi who had initially produced them. He is the father of Ame-no-Koyane and possibly the father of Sukunabikona. He is a hitorigami and one of the five kotoamatsukami.
Kamiumi
After the kuniumi, where Izanagi and Izanami created the land of Japan, they created many of (but not all) the myriad kami who inhabit the land, finally culminating in the birth of Kagu-tsuchi and the death of Izanami, which resulted in the creation of even more kami as Izanagi went to Yomi to retrieve her but ended up fleeing. The last three born were Amaterasu, Susanoo and Tsukuyomi, when he purified himself after his escape.
Kamiyonanayo
The seven generations of kami who came into existence after the heavens and the earth took shape but before the birth of Japan, starting with Kuni-no-Tokotachi and culminating in Izanagi and Izanami.
Kamo no Okimi
The son of Kotoshironushi and Tamakushi-hime, the brother of Himetataraisuzu-hime, and an ancestor of the Kamo clan and the Miwa clan.
Kamotaketsunumi no Mikoto
The grandson of Kamimusubi and the son of Futodama, the father of Tamakushi-hime, he is better known as Yatagarasu, which he incarnated as. He is the founder of the Kamo clan and the deity of the Shimogamo Shrine.
Kamuo Ichihime
A daughter of Ōyamatsumi and the second wife of Susanoo, the aunt of Kushinadahime and the mother of Ukanomitama and Toshigami.
Kaname-ishi
A mythological rock that is said to hold down the Japanese archipelago. Earthquakes happen when it is jostled, such as by the catfish Namazu which dwells near it. Takemikazuchi is said to restrain Namazu, but he occasionally lets his guard down.
Kanedama
A spirit that carries money.
Kangiten
The elephant-headed god of Bliss venerated mainly in the Shingon and Tendai schools of Japanese Buddhism, comparable to Ganesha.
Kappa
A famous reptilian water monster with a water-filled head and a love of cucumbers.
Karasu-tengu
A low-ranking tengu that looks like an anthropomorphic bird.
Karura
A divine anthropomorphic eagle akin to the Hindu Garuda.
Kasa-obake
A paper-umbrella monster that is sometimes considered a tsukumogami.
Kasha
A cart-like demon that descends from the sky, or a cat-like demon, which carries away the corpses of evildoers.
Katawaguruma
A type of wanyūdō, with an anguished woman instead of a monk's head in a burning wheel.
Kawaakago
A river spirit that pretends to be a crying baby to lure people in for pranks that sometimes prove fatal to the victim.
Kawa-no-Kami
The king of the river gods, who serves the Emperor. He is mentioned only in the Man'yōshū.
Kawauso
Mischievous shapeshifting river otter spirits.
Kaya-no-hime
A kami of vegetation, grass and fields. She is considered a protector of fields and an ancestor of herbs. She is a daughter of Izanagi and Izanami, and the sister of Ōyamatsumi, who is also her husband.
Kechibi
Fireballs with human faces inside, told of in Kōchi Prefecture and thought to be a type of onryō.
Keneō
An old man seated in the Underworld who weighs the clothes (or skin) given to him by Datsue-ba and thus passes judgment.
Kesaran Pasaran
Fluffy white puffballs which float aimlessly through the air and are harbingers of good luck.
Keukegen
A small dog-like creature covered entirely in long hair, considered by some to be a disease spirit.
Kijimuna
Tree spirits from Okinawa that resemble red-headed small children.
Kijo
A term for female oni, the most famous of which is Onibaba.
Kinoko
A yamawaro variant from the Kinki region that resembles a very young child on the very rare occasions when it is visible at all.
Kirin
The Japanese version of the Chinese qilin, which is part dragon and part deer with antlers, fish scales and an ox's tail. Said to be a protective creature and the guardian of the metal element.
Kisshōten
A goddess of good fortune, associated with beauty, happiness and fertility. One of the Seven Lucky Gods, though she is sometimes omitted in favor of Fukurokuju.
Kitsune
Mischievous shapeshifting fox spirits with up to nine tails.
Kitsunebi
Atmospheric ghost lights thought to be flames created by a kitsune.
Kitsune no yomeiri
A parade of ghost lights that resembles a wedding procession, thought to be due to the marriage of two kitsune.
Kiyohime
A woman who transformed into a serpent demon out of the rage of unrequited love.
Kodama
Spirits that live in trees, said to be the cause of echoes.
Kōjin
The kami of fire, the hearth and the kitchen. He is said to represent fire as a controlled force and is also said to destroy all impurity.
Kokakuchō
A nocturnal bird which is said to steal babies and is associated with ubume.
Komainu
A pair of lion-dogs that guard the entrances of temples and shrines.
Komayō
A mysterious enchantress (駒妖) from the Kansai region who appears during full moons to challenge people to games of ōgi, a variant of Shogi. Those who accept her challenge are said to have their souls transformed into yūrei (ghosts). Modern sightings have been reported in urban areas.
Konaki-jiji
The vengeful spirit of an infant left to die, it cries until someone picks it up, then turns into a heavy stone and crushes them.
Konjin
A kami of compass directions, who changes position with the year, lunar month, and season. Whatever position he chooses is deemed unlucky, so calendars are made so people can avoid that position.
Konohanachiru-hime
A daughter of Ōyamatsumi, the sister of Iwanaga-hime and Konohanasakuya-hime and the wife of Yashimajinumi. She is an ancestor of Ōkuninushi.
Konohanasakuya-hime
A kami of Mount Fuji and all volcanoes who is also known as the blossom-princess, symbol of delicate earthly life. She is a daughter of Ōyamatsumi, the sister of Iwanaga-hime and Konohanachiru-hime, the wife of Ninigi-no-Mikoto and the mother of Hoori and his two siblings Hoderi and Hosuseri.
Konoha-tengu
A low-ranking tengu that looks like an anthropomorphic bird.
Koromodako
A size-shifting octopus-like yōkai that lives in the waters bordering Kyoto and Fukui Prefecture.
Koropokkuru
A race of little people from Ainu folklore who once traded with humans but have since disappeared.
Korōri
A hybrid beast that resembles a tanuki with the stripes of a tiger and the mouth of a wolf.
Kosenjōbi
Fireballs that float over former battlefields.
Kosode-no-te
A kosode that has come to life as a tsukumogami.
Kotoamatsukami
A general term for the first five kami to come into existence when the universe was born but before the heavens and the earth took shape, born without any procreation.
Kotobuki
A Japanese chimera with the features of the beasts from the Chinese Zodiac: a rat's head, rabbit ears, ox horns, a horse's mane, a rooster's comb, a sheep's beard, a dragon's neck, a back like that of a boar, a tiger's shoulders and belly, monkey arms, a dog's hindquarters, and a snake's tail.
Koto-furunushi
A koto that has come to life as a tsukumogami and now has a leering, demonic face and a mane made out of strings but generally stays put and does nothing.
Kotoshironushi
A son of Ōkuninushi and Nunakawahime, the husband of Tamakushi-hime, the brother of Ajisukitakahikone and Takeminakata, the father of Kamo no Okimi and possibly the father of Himetataraisuzu-hime. He quietly accepted his father's demotion from ruler of earth in favor of Ninigi-no-Mikoto. He advised Empress Jingū during her invasion of Korea and is one of the eight deities charged with protecting the Imperial Court.
Kubikajiri
A nocturnal graveyard-haunting headless beast that stinks of fresh blood and eats the heads of its victims.
Kuchisake-onna
The malevolent spirit of a woman whose face was disfigured into a Glasgow smile, who attacks people to inflict identical mutilations upon those few she doesn't kill outright.
Kuda-gitsune
A small fox-like animal used in sorcery.
Kudan
A human-faced cow that gave a prophecy of either an epidemic or a bountiful harvest and instructed that its likeness be hung in various places for good luck.
Kuebiko
A kami of folk wisdom, knowledge and agriculture who is commonly depicted as a scarecrow.
Kukunochi
The kami of trees, worshipped on the occasion of roof-raising ceremonies and the blessing of new houses. He is either the son of Izanagi and Izanami or Shinatsuhiko, and the brother of Watatsumi and Ōyamatsumi.
Kikurihime
The kami who mediated between Izanagi and Izanami after the former escaped from Yomi. For this reason she is considered the goddess of marriage and harmony.
Kumanokusubi
The fifth son of Amaterasu, created in a kami-making competition between her and Susanoo.
Kumo Yōkai
A Japanese spider demon.
Kunado-no-Kami
Local kami connected chiefly with protection against disaster and malicious spirits. They protect the boundaries of villages.
Kunekune
A long, slender strip of paper that wiggles on rice or barley fields during hot summers, this yōkai is actually a recent invention.
Kuni-no-Tokotachi
One of two gods born after the heavens and earth took shape, born from a reed-shoot growing between heaven and earth. He is a hitorigami and the first of the kamiyonanayo, the seven generations of kami that culminate in Izanagi and Izanami.
Kunitama
A type of kami that acts as a tutelary deity or guardian of a province of Japan or sometimes other areas in Shinto.
Kunitsukami
The general term for kami of the land, who live on earth, as opposed to the amatsukami who live in Takamagahara. They are considered personifications of the land, and are thusly associated with geographical areas along with their inhabitants. Non-royal families also view them as their ancestors.
Kuniumi
The creation of the primordial landmass Onogoroshima by Izanagi and Izanami, followed by the creation of the islands of Japan. The kamiumi, where the land's kami were born, came afterward.
Kuni-yuzuri
The passage of leadership of Japan from the earthly kami (the kunitsukami) to the heavenly kami (the amatsukami) and their eventual descendants, the Imperial House of Japan.
Kunne cikap
Monstrous "Black Bird[s]" of Ainu lore
Kuraokami
A Japanese dragon and Shinto deity of rain and snow, born from Kagu-tsuchi's blood or body after Izanagi slew him because his birth killed Izanami.
Kusanagi-no-Tsurugi
A sword Susanoo found in one of the tails of the Yamata-no-Orochi after he killed it and subsequently gave to Amaterasu to settle an old grievance between them. It is part of the Imperial Regalia of Japan.
Kushinadahime
One of the wives of Susanoo, whom he saved from being eaten by the Yamata-no-Orochi. She was the mother of Yashimajinumi.
Kuzenbo
The king of all kappa, who dwells in the Chikugo River, which flows through Fukuoka Prefecture and Saga Prefecture. He was originally merely the leader of the mountain kappa until he won a contest against Sha Wujing for leadership of the river kappa.
Kuzuryū
A nine-headed dragon deity sometimes associated with water.
Kyōkotsu
A skeletal figure that emerges from a well where someone died a violent death.
Kyonshii
The Japanese version of the Chinese hopping vampire, known as jiāngshī.
Kyōrinrin
Scrolls or papers that have come to life as a tsukumogami.
Kyubi
Another name for kitsune.

== M ==
Makuragaeshi
A yōkai that flips pillows and moves sleepers' bodies.
Maneki-neko
A luck-bringing cat spirit commonly depicted in figurines.
Mazoku
A general term for demons, devils and evil spirits.
Mekurabe
The multiplying, combining human skulls that menaced Taira no Kiyomori in his courtyard in The Tale of the Heike.
Menreiki
A tsukumogami composed of gigaku masks.
Miage-nyūdō
A type of mikoshi-nyūdō from Sado Island that grows taller as fast as you can look up at it but disappears if you look down instead.
Mikaribaba
A one-eyed old woman from the Kantō region.
Mikoshi-nyūdō
A bald goblin with an extending neck that enjoys scaring people by peeking over the top of folding screens and the like.
Misaki
A term for various high-ranking divine spirits, taken from the name for a kannushi's vanguard.
Mitama
The spirit of a kami or the soul of a dead person, composed of four parts: the ara-mitama, the nigi-mitama, the saki-mitama and the kushi-mitama.
Mizuchi
A dangerous water dragon, believed by some to be a deity.
Mizuhanome
A water kami born from Izanami's urine as she died, tasked with her dying breath with pacifying Kagu-tsuchi should he become violent and dousing his fires. She is the sister of Wakumusubi, who was born the same way.
Mokumokuren
A swarm of eyes that appear on torn paper sliding walls in old buildings.
Momonjii
A mischievous spirit that takes the form of an old man and waits for travelers at every fork in the road.
Mononoke
A general term for any mischievous or troublesome creature/entity of uncertain origin, sometimes used to refer to yōkai.
Moreya
A kami famous for battling Takeminakata, he is the mythical ancestor of the Moriya clan.
Morinji-no-kama
Another name for bunbuku chagama, the bake-danuki teakettle.
Mōryō
A general term for various water demons that eat corpses.
Mujina
A shapeshifting badger spirit.
Myōbu
A title sometimes given to a higher-ranking kitsune servant of Inari Ōkami.
Myōjin
A title historically given to kami and, by extension, their shrines.
Myōken
A deification of the North Star worshipped mainly in the Nichiren, Shingon and Tendai schools of Japanese Buddhism.

== N ==
Nakisawame
A kami of spring water, born from the tears Izanagi shed after Izanami died from giving birth to Kagu-tsuchi.
Namahage
A ritual-disciplinary demon from the Oga Peninsula area of Akita Prefecture whose purpose is to scare naughty children into behaving.
Namazu
A giant catfish dwelling beneath the earth, near the kaname-ishi, the rock that holds down the Japanese archipelago, that causes earthquakes when it moves. Takemikazuchi is said to restrain it, but he occasionally lets his guard down.
Nekomata
A malevolent cat yōkai with either two tails or a forked tail, different from the bakeneko in that it typically doesn't shapeshift.
Ne-no-kuni
A mythical realm that is sometimes considered the same as Yomi and Tokoyo no kuni. Susanoo is said to be its ruler.
Nikujin
Another name for nuppeppō.
Ningen
An enormous white whale-like sea creature with humanoid features that dwells in subantarctic oceans, this yōkai is actually a recent invention.
Ningyo
A fish person or mermaid, the flesh of which is sometimes said to grant good health and long life, if not outright immortality.
Ninigi-no-Mikoto
Grandson of sun goddess Amaterasu and great-grandfather of Japan's first emperor, Emperor Jimmu. The amatsukami sent him down from Takamagahara to replace Ōkuninushi as the ruler of the earth.
Nobusuma
A flying squirrel-like monster (possibly inspired by the Indian giant flying squirrel).
Noderabō
A monk spirit that haunts abandoned temples and rings the bell when there's no one around.
Nogitsune
A dangerous type of kitsune from Kyūshū that is known to possess people.
Noppera-bō
A faceless ghost that enjoys scaring people and is sometimes confused with mujina.
Nozuchi
A fat snake-like creature.
Nue
A Japanese chimera with the head of a monkey, the body of a raccoon dog, the legs of a tiger, and a snake-headed tail. It plagued the Emperor with nightmares in the Heike Monogatari.
Nukekubi
A vicious humanlike monster whose head detaches from its body, often confused with the much more peaceful rokurokubi, whose neck merely extends indefinitely.
Nunakawahime
A kami who helps with singing, blessings of children and easy childbirth. She is the wife of Ōkuninushi and the mother of Ajisukitakahikone, Kotoshironushi and Takeminakata.
Nuppeppō
An animated lump of decaying meat with vaguely humanoid features, believed by some to be a type of noppera-bō.
Nurarihyon
A strange large-headed character who sneaks into houses on busy evenings, said by some to be the boss of all yōkai.
Nure-onna
A huge snake-like monster with a woman's head, which appears on the seashore.
Nuribotoke
An animated corpse with blackened flesh and dangling eyeballs.
Nurikabe
A ghostly wall from Kyūshū that traps and misdirects travelers at night.
Nyūdō-bōzu
A yōkai that grows taller the further one looks up and is thusly considered a type of mikoshi-nyūdō, believed in some places to be a tanuki or mujina.
Nyūnaisuzume
Sparrows that flew from the mouth of exiled poet Fujiwara no Sanekata.

== O ==
Obake
Various shapeshifting spirits that are a type of yōkai; also known as bakemono.
Obariyon
A yōkai which rides piggyback on a human victim and becomes unbearably heavy.
Oboroguruma
An ox cart with a face in its carriage that appears on misty moonlit nights in Kyoto.
Ōgama
A giant toad which breathes rainbow-like smoke and wields a giant spear against whoever attacks it.
Oiwa
The ghost of a woman with a disfigured face, who was poisoned and murdered by her husband. The most famous onryō of all.
Ōkaburo
A cross-dressing yōkai that haunts brothels.
Ōkami
A powerful wolf spirit that either takes a person's life or protects it, depending on the actions one takes in their life.
Okiku
The plate-counting ghost of a servant girl who met a tragic end. One of the three most famous onryō.
Ōkubi
The huge face of a woman which appears in the sky, either portending disaster or causing it.
Ōkuninushi
A kami of nation-building, agriculture, medicine, and protective magic. He is the son of Ame-no-Fuyukinu, the husband of Nunakawahime and the father of Ajisukitakahikone, Kotoshironushi and Takeminakata. He was the leader of the terrestrial kami (the kunitsukami) and the original ruler of the earth until the heavenly kami (the amatsukami) demanded he step down in favor of them. His replacement was Ninigi-no-Mikoto.
Okuri-inu
A spectral dog which follows lone travelers, attacking them if they trip and fall over. Similar to the Black dog of English folklore.
Ōmagatoki
The moment of dusk, when the spirit world and the material world overlap as the night-things come out to play until dawn comes.
Omizunu
The great-great-grandson of Susanoo and father of Ame-no-Fuyukinu, who is famous for expanding Izumo Province by dragging a piece of the land of Silla over to it. He also gave the province its name, naming it after himself.
Omoikane
The kami of intelligence and wisdom, called upon to provide good counsel in the deliberations of the heavenly deities. He is a son of Takamimusubi and the brother of Futodama and Takuhadachiji-hime.
Ōmononushi
The mitama of Ōkuninushi, god of nation-building, agriculture, business, medicine, brewing, and seafaring.
Ōmukade
A giant, human-eating centipede that lives in the mountains and finds human saliva toxic.
Oni
The classic Japanese demon. It is an ogre-like creature which often has horns.
Onibaba
The demonic hag of Adachigahara.
Onibi
A demonic flame which sucks out the life of those who come too close to it.
Onihitokuchi
A species of one-eyed oni that kill and eat humans, large enough to devour a man in one bite.
Onikuma
A bipedal bear yōkai from the Kiso Valley in Nagano Prefecture, that carries livestock out of villages at night.
Onmoraki
A bird-demon created from the spirits of freshly dead corpses.
Onmyōji
A human who has powers like those of a yōkai, typically employed by the Imperial Court for divination rituals and the like.
Onogoroshima
The primordial landmass Izanagi and Izanami raised from the sea with the spear Ame-no-Nuboko. They then built a palace on top with a great column in the middle. When they had done this, they went around the column in opposite directions, and when they met on the opposite side, they were married and they began to give birth to the islands of Japan.
Onryō
A vengeful ghost formed from powerful feelings like rage or sorrow.
Ōnyūdō
A general term for yōkai that take on the appearance of Buddhist monks.
Osakabehime
An old woman yōkai who resides in Himeji Castle in Hyōgo Prefecture and who can read and manipulate people's hearts.
Osaki
A term for possession by a kitsune.
Oshira-sama
A tutelary deity of the home. When it is in one's home, one cannot eat meat and only women are allowed to touch it.
Oto-hime
The daughter of Ryūjin the Dragon God, told of in the tale of Urashima Tarō.
Otoroshi
A hairy creature that perches on torii gates to shrines and temples.
Ouni
A type of yama-uba with a slit mouth and a body covered in long black hair.
Oyagami
An ancestor, deity, or soul of an ancestor who is worshipped as a deity in a certain clan.
Oyamakui no Kami
The androgynous, possibly hermaphroditic kami of mountains and good health, child of Toshigami and grandchild of Susanoo.
Ōyamatsumi
A kami of mountains, seas and war, and an elder brother of Amaterasu, Susanoo and Tsukuyomi, born from Kagu-tsuchi's blood or body when Izanagi killed him after his birth killed Izanami. He is the brother and husband of Kaya-no-hime, the father of Konohanasakuya-hime, Konohanachiru-hime and Iwanaga-hime and many others, and the grandfather of Hoderi, Hoori, and Hosuseri.

== R ==
Raijin
The Shinto thunder god, brother of Fūjin the wind god. They were unleashed upon the world when Izanagi fled Yomi.
Raijū
A doglike beast that falls to earth in a lightning bolt, said to be the companion of Raijin.
Raitarō
A thunder god said to be the son of Raijin.
Reikon
The Shinto term for the soul, which, after death, stays in a type of purgatory until proper funeral rites are performed.
Rōjinbi
A ghostly fire that appears with an old person, sometimes believed to be the work of tengu.
Rokurokubi
A person, usually female, whose neck can stretch indefinitely, as opposed to the much more vicious nukekubi, whose head detaches completely.
Ryūgū
The undersea Dragon Palace where Ryūjin the Dragon God lives alongside his daughter, Oto-hime.
Ryūjin
The Dragon God of the sea, who dwells in the undersea Dragon Palace and is the father of Oto-hime.
Ryuu
The Japanese dragon, typically associated with water and rainfall.

== S ==
Sa Gojō
The water monster Sha Wujing from Journey to the West, often interpreted in Japan as a kappa.
Sakabashira
An inverted wooden pillar in a temple that attracts yōkai and causes bad luck.
Samebito
A shark-man from the undersea Dragon Palace.
Sankai
An amorphous afterbirth spirit that takes the place of a baby if a pregnant mother is not properly cared for.
Sansei
A humanoid yōkai with a single leg twisted backwards.
Sarakazoe
A type of onibi that appears as a counting plate.
Sarutahiko Ōkami
The patron kami of martial arts and the guardian of the Ame-no-ukihashi bridge. He initially blocked Ninigi-no-Mikoto's descent to earth until Ame-no-Uzume persuaded him to let him pass. He would later become her husband.
Satori
A mountain-dwelling monkey-like creature that can read one's thoughts, hailing from Gifu Prefecture.
Sazae-oni
A turban snail of great age, typically thirty years, which has gained the ability to turn into a woman.
Seiryū
The Japanese version of the Chinese Azure Dragon of the East.
Senbiki-ōkami
A phenomenon where a pack of wolves chase a hunter up a tree, then stack themselves to form a ladder for the largest wolf to climb in order to get to the hunter.
Sesshō-seki
The poison gas-spewing "killing stone" which Tamamo-no-Mae's spirit transformed into upon her final defeat in the form of Hoji, until her repentant spirit's eventual exorcism. The stone has since broken, much to the dismay of those unaware of her change of heart.
Shachihoko
A dragon-headed carp whose image is often used in architecture.
Shibaemon-tanuki
A bake-danuki from Awaji Island. One of the three most famous tanuki.
Shichinin misaki
A group of seven ghosts told of in Shikoku and the Chūgoku region who sicken the living, seeking to ascend to Heaven by forcing their victims to take their place.
Shidaidaka
A size-changing humanoid yōkai that appears above roads in the Chūgoku region.
Shikigami
A spirit or minor kami summoned to do the bidding of an onmyōji.
Shikome
Wild women, or perhaps a single wild woman, sent by Izanami to pursue Izanagi as he fled Yomi.
Shinatsuhiko
A kami of wind, created when Izanagi blew away the morning clouds from the freshly-created islands of Japan.
Shinigami
Malevolent spirits that appear where people have died violently and try to lure others to similar if not identical deaths.
Shintai
Physical objects worshipped at or near Shinto shrines as repositories where spirits or kami reside. They are not the kami themselves, just temporary repositories which make the kami accessible for humans to worship. They are, by nature and necessity, yorishiro, objects capable of attracting kami.
Shiranui
A mysterious flame seen over the seas in Kumamoto Prefecture.
Shirime
An apparition in the shape of a man having an eye in the place of his anus.
Shirōneri
Mosquito nettings or dust clothes that have come to life as a tsukumogami.
Shiryō
The souls of the dead, the opposite of ikiryō.
Shisa
The Okinawan version of the shishi.
Shishi
The paired lion-dogs that guard the entrances of temples.
Shōjō
Red-haired sea sprites who love alcohol, believed by some to actually be orangutans.
Shōkera
A creature which peeks in through the skylights of old houses and reports any evil deeds it sees to the gods that determine people's life span, which is adjusted accordingly.
Shuten-dōji
The name of a particularly powerful oni lord killed by Minamoto no Yorimitsu.
Sōjōbō
The famous daitengu of Mount Kurama, who rules over all tengu as their king and god.
Sorei
The spirits of those ancestors that have been the target of special memorial services that have been held for them at certain fixed times after their death.
Son Gokū
The monkey king Sun Wukong from Journey to the West.
Suijin
A name given to the kami of water and to a wide variety of mythical and magical creatures found in water.
Suiko
Another name for kappa.
Sukunabikona
The Shinto kami of the onsen (hot springs), agriculture, healing, magic, brewing sake and knowledge. The child of either Kamimusubi or Takamimusubi, he helped Ōkuninushi build the land known as Izumo Province.
Sumiyoshi sanjin
A collective name for three gods of the sea and sailing, born together with Watatsumi when Izanagi purified himself after returning from Yomi.
Sunakake-baba
An old woman who throws sand in people's faces.
Sunekosuri
A doglike yōkai from Okayama Prefecture that rubs against people's legs at night or when it is raining and gets in people's way as they walk.
Susanoo
The Shinto storm god, brother of Amaterasu the sun goddess and Tsukuyomi the moon god. He was banished from Takamagahara and some say he now rules Ne-no-kuni.
Suzaku
The Japanese version of the Chinese Vermilion Bird of the South.
Suzuri-no-tamashii
An inkstone that has come to life as a tsukumogami.

== T ==
Tajimamori
The kami of sweets, who was sent by Emperor Suinin to fetch a magical fruit from the land of Tokoyo no kuni. He returned after ten years to find that the Emperor had died. He gave some of the fruit to the Emperor's widow and offered the rest of the fruit at the Emperor's tomb, then died of grief.
Takakuraji
The great-grandson of Watatsumi, the son of Amenohoakari and the ancestor of the Owari clan, he helped with Jimmu's Eastern Expedition. Takemikazuchi placed his sword in Takakuraji's warehouse, where Takakuraji found it and then gave it to Emperor Jimmu after being told to do so in a dream.
Takamagahara
The abode of the heavenly kami (the amatsukami), typically depicted as being in the sky and connected to the earth below by a floating bridge called Ame-no-ukihashi, which is guarded by Sarutahiko Ōkami.
Takamimusubi
A kami of agriculture and the second of the first beings to come into existence when the heavens and the earth took shape. He is a hitorigami, one of the five kotoamatsukami and the father of Futodama, Omoikane and Takuhadachiji-hime and possibly the father of Sukunabikona.
Takaonna
A female spirit that can stretch her waist to peer inside buildings.
Takarabune
A mythical ship piloted through the heavens by the Seven Lucky Gods during the first three days of the New Year.
Takemikazuchi
A sword god, a god of thunder, and a participant in the first recorded sumo wrestling match, which was against Takeminakata. He is the son of Ame-no-ohabari via the spilled blood of Kagu-tsuchi. He also subdued Amatsu-Mikaboshi and tries to keep the giant catfish Namazu from causing earthquakes at the kaname-ishi, the rock that holds down the Japanese archipelago.
Takeminakata
A kami of wind, water, hunting and warfare, and the ancestor of the Suwa clan, among others. The son of Ōkuninushi and Nunakawahime, the husband of Yasakatome and the brother of Ajisukitakahikone and Kotoshironushi. He was Takemikazuchi's opponent in the first recorded sumo wrestling match.
Takitsuhiko
A kami of waterfalls, the son of Ajisukitakahikone and the nephew of Kotoshironushi and Takemikazuchi.
Takuhadachiji-hime
A kami of textiles, a daughter of Takamimusubi, the younger sister of Omoikane, the wife of Ame-no-oshihomimi and the mother of Amenohoakari and Ninigi-no-Mikoto.
Tamakushi-hime
The daughter of Kamotaketsunumi no Mikoto, the wife of either Kotoshironushi or Ōmononushi, and the mother of Himetataraisuzu-hime, the first Empress of Japan, second wife of Emperor Jimmu.
Tamamo-no-Mae
A wicked nine-tailed fox who appeared as a courtesan to beguile Emperor Konoe.
Tamanooya-no-Mikoto
The kami who created the gem Yasakani-no-Magatama. He is the ancestor of the Shinabe clan.
Tamayori-hime
A daughter of Watatsumi and the sister of Toyotama-hime, she raised her sister's son Ugayafukiaezu in her stead. She later became his wife and the mother of Emperor Jimmu.
Ta-no-Kami
A kami who observes the harvest of rice plants to bring a good harvest, and as such is revered by farmers and peasants.
Tanuki
The Japanese raccoon dog. In folklore, tanuki have the ability to shapeshift.
Tanuki-bayashi
A phenomenon where flutes and drums are heard at night with no visible source, thought to be a tanuki trick.
Teke Teke
The vengeful spirit of a slain schoolgirl, with a half upper-torso body, who goes around killing people by slicing them in half at the waist using a scythe, thusly mimicking her own disfigurement.
Ten
A mischievous shapeshifting weasel.
Tengu
A wise demon with two variants: a red-skinned old man with a long nose, or an anthropomorphic bird.
Tenjin
The patron kami of academics, scholarship, of learning, and of the intelligentsia. He is the deification of Sugawara no Michizane.
Tenjōkudari
A female yōkai that crawls on the ceiling.
Tenka
Atmospheric ghost lights, once believed to be a type of onryō.
Tenko
An elderly fox spirit that has gained its ninth and final tail and thusly reached the full extent of its power.
Tennin
The Japanese Buddhist version of angels.
Tenome
A ghostly blind man with his eyes on his palms.
Tenson kōrin
The descent of Amaterasu's grandson Ninigi-no-Mikoto from Takamagahara to the land of Japan (then known as Ashihara no Nakatsukuni) to become its ruler. Soon after this, Hoori and his siblings Hoderi and Hosuseri were born.
Teratsutsuki
The onryō of a man who lived in the 6th century.
Tesso
A priest from the Heian period who was snubbed by the Emperor and became a swarm of rats which laid waste to a rival temple.
Tōfu-kozō
A yōkai that appears as a young boy carrying a tray of tōfu.
Tokoyo no kuni
A mythical realm where various kami and spirits of ancestors live with eternal youth. Tajimamori was sent here by Emperor Suinin to fetch a magical fruit.
Toshigami
The kami of abundant harvests, specifically of rice and grain, and a son of Susanoo. He is the older brother of Ukanomitama.
Toyotama-hime
A daughter of Watatsumi, the sister of Tamayori-hime, the wife of Hoori, the mother of Ugayafukiaezu and the grandmother of Emperor Jimmu.
Toyouke-hime
The kami of agriculture, industry, food, clothing, and houses in the Shinto religion. She is the granddaughter of Izanagi and the daughter of Wakumusubi.
Tsuchigumo
A clan of spider-like yōkai.
Tsuchinoko
A legendary serpentine monster. It is now a cryptid resembling a fat snake.
Tsukinowaguma
A legendary bear.
Tsukumogami
An animated tea caddy that Matsunaga Hisahide used to bargain a peace with Oda Nobunaga. It is now understood to mean any 100-year-old inanimate object that has come to life.
Tsukuyomi
The Shinto moon god, brother of Amaterasu the sun goddess and Susanoo the storm god.
Tsurara-onna
An icicle that became a woman, often confused with yuki-onna.
Tsurubebi
A fiery yōkai that drops out of the tops of trees and dangles, also known in some places as tsurube-otoshi.
Tsurube-otoshi
A monster that drops out of the tops of trees to attack and sometimes eat those who pass beneath the trees.

== U ==
Ubagabi
Atmospheric ghost lights from Kawachi Province and Tanba Province.
Ubume
The spirit of a woman who died in childbirth, lingering to protect the child she left behind or to lament its death and her own.
Ugajin
A kami of harvests and fertility, commonly depicted as a coiled snake with the head of a man or a woman.
Ugayafukiaezu
The son of Hoori and Toyotama-hime, the husband of Tamayori-hime, and the father of Emperor Jimmu.
Ujigami
A Shinto guardian spirit or kami of a particular place, prayed to for a number of reasons, such as success in endeavors, good harvests and protection from sickness.
Ukanomitama
A kami associated with food and agriculture, often identified with Inari Ōkami, the kami of rice, a child of Susanoo and the younger sibling of Toshigami.
Ukemochi
A kami of food who produced food by vomiting or defecating, slain by either Susanoo or Tsukuyomi, who either feared she had poisoned the food by producing it in that manner or felt the act was disrespectful. The version where Tsukuyomi was the killer explains why the sun and the moon are not seen together as Amaterasu, who heard of Ukemochi's passing, never wanted to meet her killer again, or he hides during the day out of fear of her wrath.
Uma-no-ashi
A tree with hidden horse's legs that kick passersby before withdrawing into the leaves to hide.
Umashiashikabihikoji
The fourth deity to come into existence when the heavens and the earth took shape, born from a reed-like object that appeared between heaven and earth. He is a hitorigami and one of the five kotoamatsukami.
Umibōzu
A giant humanoid monster that appears on the surface of the sea and tries to sink ships in various ways.
Umi-nyōbō
A female sea monster who steals fish.
Umi zatō
A yōkai that manifests as a giant Buddhist monk striding across the ocean waves, seen off the coast of Rikuchū Province.
Ungaikyō
A mirror that has come to life as a tsukumogami and now distorts all reflections into monstrous images.
Ushi no toki mairi
A curse cast at the Hour of the Ox (between 1 and 3 in the morning) by a black magic user, with various harmful effects.
Ushi-oni
The name given to an assortment of ox-headed monsters that appear on beaches and attack those who walk there.
Ushi-onna
A kimono-clad woman with a cow's head, the opposite of the kudan.
Ushirogami
A one-eyed, footless female spirit who sneaks up behind people to pull on their hair.
Uwan
A spirit named for the sound it makes when surprising people.

== W ==
Waira
A large beast that lurks in the mountains, about which little is known.
Wakahiru-me
A goddess of the rising sun, either a daughter or little sister of Amaterasu. Some say she was the maiden killed when Susanoo threw a flayed horse at Amaterasu's loom.
Wakumusubi
A kami of agriculture, who was either born from Izanami's urine as she died or from the union of Kagu-tsuchi and Haniyasu-hime. He is the brother of Mizuhanome and the father of Toyouke-hime.
Wani
A dragon or sea monster comparable to an alligator or crocodile (or perhaps a shark, given the kanji). A related word has been applied to the saltwater crocodile.
Wanyūdō
A flaming wheel with a man's head in the center, that sucks out the soul of anyone who sees it.
Watatsumi
Possibly another name for Ryūjin, or another dragon god of the sea. Tamayori-hime and Toyotama-hime are his daughters.

== Y ==
Yadōkai
The spirits of low-ranking monks who have turned to mischief.
Yakusanoikazuchi
The collective name for eight thunder deities, said to be either the maggots on Izanami's corpse or some of the forces she sent to pursue Izanagi as he fled Yomi. Each one represents a different type of storm.
Yamabiko
Small mountain-dwelling creatures that create echoes.
Yama-inu
A doglike mountain spirit that may appear to travelers on mountain roads. It may be friendly, or may attack and kill the traveler, depending on the tale (also see the Japanese wolf).
Yamajijii
An old man spirit with one eye and one leg, found in Shikoku.
Yamako
An ape-like occasionally-cannibalistic creature that can read minds.
Yama-no-Kami
The kami of mountains. There are two types: gods of the mountains who are worshipped by hunters, woodcutters, and charcoal burners or gods of agriculture who come down from the mountains and are worshipped by farmers. They are generally considered to be female.
Yamaoroshi
A vegetable grater that has come to life as a tsukumogami. It is said to be almost porcupine-like in appearance.
Yamata no Orochi
The eight-headed dragon/serpent monster slain by the god Susanoo to rescue Kushinadahime, who would become his first wife. He found the sword Kusanagi-no-Tsurugi in one of its tails and gave it to Amaterasu to settle an old grievance between them.
Yama-uba
A crone-like yōkai who dwells in the mountains.
Yamawaro
Mountain-dwelling yōkai from Western Japan, believed by some to actually be kappa that have moved to the mountains.
Yanari
A phenomenon where a house or furniture shakes for no reason, once thought to be a prank by house-dwelling yōkai but now considered a poltergeist-like phenomenon.
Yasakani-no-Magatama
A jewel that was made by Tamanooya-no-Mikoto. It is part of the Imperial Regalia of Japan.
Yasakatome
A kami of water, agriculture, hot springs and nation-building. She is the wife of Takeminakata, but very little is known about her. Some say she is a daughter of Watatsumi, but no one is sure.
Yashimajinumi
The son of Susanoo and Kushinadahime and the husband of Konohanachiru-hime. He is one of the ancestors of Ōkuninushi.
Yashima no Hage-tanuki
A bake-danuki from Kagawa Prefecture that protects the Taira clan. One of the three most famous tanuki.
Yatagarasu
The giant three-legged crow of Amaterasu that guided Emperor Jimmu through the mountains to the land that would become his kingdom and is seen as a god of guidance. It is generally accepted as an incarnation of Kamotaketsunumi no Mikoto.
Yata-no-Kagami
A mirror that was made by Ishikori-dome no Mikoto and Ama-Tsu-Mara to lure Amaterasu back out of Ama-no-Iwato after she hid herself away there. It is part of the Imperial Regalia of Japan.
Yato-no-kami
Deadly snake spirits which infest fields in Namegata county and kill the families of those who see them.
Yobuko
A mountain-dwelling spirit from the San'in region and the city of Tottori that is said to be the reason echoes occur.
Yofune-nushi
A malevolent sea serpent from the Oki Islands that demanded the yearly sacrifice of virgin maidens until the daughter of an exiled samurai slew it.
Yōkai
A class of supernatural monsters, spirits, and demons in Japanese folklore. They can also be called ayakashi (妖怪), mononoke (物の怪), or mamono.
Yomi
The land of the dead, where Izanami went after giving birth to Kagu-tsuchi killed her. She now rules there.
Yomotsu Hirasaka
The boundary between Yomi and the land of the living, blocked by a huge boulder Izanagi placed there once he had escaped.
Yomotsu-shikome
The hags of Yomi, or perhaps a single hag, sent by Izanami to pursue Izanagi as he fled.
Yonaki ishi
Stones that are said to cry at night. The most famous of these is located in the city of Kakegawa in Shizuoka Prefecture.
Yorishiro
Objects capable of attracting kami, giving them a space to occupy during worship. They are used during ceremonies to call the kami for worship. Once a yorishiro actually houses a kami, it is called a shintai.
Yōsei
The Japanese version of fairies, and the term for spirits from Western legends.
Yosuzume
A mysterious bird yōkai that sings at night, sometimes indicating that the okuri-inu is near.
Yuki-onna
A malevolent spirit that manifests as a beautiful woman wandering snowy mountain passes.
Yume no seirei
A wizened, emaciated old man yōkai that causes nightmares.
Yūrei
Ghosts in a more Western sense, in that they are the lingering spirits of the restless dead.

== Z ==
Zashiki-warashi
A protective childlike house spirit from Iwate Prefecture that brings good fortune to the house it inhabits.
Zenfushō
A teakettle that has come to life as a tsukumogami.
Zennyo Ryūō
A dragon deity who is known for calling forth rain.
Zorigami
A clock that has come to life as a tsukumogami.
Zuijin
Shinto warrior-guardian spirits that watch over shrine and temple gates.
Zunbera-bō
Another name for the noppera-bō.

== See also ==
- Japanese mythology
- Kaidan
