= Azukibabaa =

Japanese monster

Azukibabaa (あずきばばあ, "the bean hag") is a monster (known in Japanese as a yōkai) from Miyagi Prefecture in the Kanto region of Japan. It is said to be an old woman who produces a sound similar to that made by azuki beans, which is referred to as azukiarai.

== Local lore ==
- Kawagoe City, Saitama Prefecture
  - It is said that at the abandoned temple in Shimo-Kosaka-mura, the sound of azuki beans can be heard on a rainy evening. In this region, parents told disobedient children that they would be "attacked by the old woman bean smasher".
- Gunma Prefecture
  - the yōkai appears in a stream near Takasaki Castle. At night, it produces the sound of azuki beans while singing "Would you like to wash or eat the red beans?" and swallows passersby.
  - In Showa-mura, it makes the sound of stirring azuki beans in a pot in a swamp. It is said to be mujina or itachi.

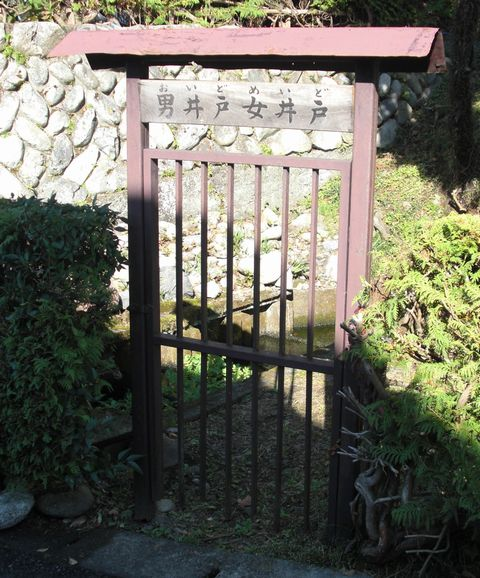
It is said that an azuki-bean woman appears in a well in Ome City, Tokyo

- Tokyo
  - In the autumn moonlight, a small voice can be heard from a brook, saying, "One red bean, two red beans...", and at dawn, an old woman in a white outfit and holding a basket disappears into the mist.
  - Azukibabaa is also said to have appeared at Otoido and Onnaido in Ōme, where the legend of Kobo Daishi persists.
- Nakamaru Kakigihira, Kiyoharu Village, Kita-Koma District, Yamanashi Prefecture
  - A local yōkai is also known as Azukibabaa. She lives in a large tree near Suwa Shrine and calls out to people who pass by at night, saying, "Eat some azuki beans", and if the person is surprised and confused, she will scoop them up into the tree with a large basket. Yōkai mythologist Kenji Murakami believes she is related to the Tsurube-otoshi yōkai, which is also said to scoop people up from the tops of trees.
- Kawawa Town, Tsuzuki Ward, Yokohama City, Kanagawa Prefecture
  - Similarly as in Saitama, Azukibabaa is spoken of as the "old woman polishing azuki beans", a child-threatening monster.
- Nishi Narita, Tomiya City, Miyagi Prefecture
  - A local yōkai is called the "Azukiarai Old Woman" and appears in the form of an old woman in a stream at dusk. It is said that her true form is a kitsune.

== See also ==
- List of legendary creatures from Japan
