= Eurynomos (daemon) =

Spirit of the underworld

In Greek mythology, Eurynomos (/jʊəˈrɪnəməs/; Ancient Greek: Εὐρύνομος, romanized: Eurynomos, lit. 'wide-ruling' or 'wide-varying/ broad custom') was an underworld-dwelling daimon (or spirit) who consumed the flesh of corpses.

== Pausanias ==
The sole piece of evidence concerning Eurynomos comes from Pausanias, in his description of a painting of Hades by Polygnotus at Delphi, Phocis:

Eurynomus, said by the Delphian guides to be one of the demons in Hades, who eats off all the flesh of the corpses, leaving only their bones. But Homer's Odyssey, the poem called the Minyad, and the Returns, although they tell of Hades, and its horrors, know of no demon called Eurynomus. However, I will describe what he is like and his attitude in the painting. He is of a color between blue and black, like that of meat flies; he is showing his teeth and is seated, and under him is spread a vulture's skin.

Carl Robert believed Eurynomus to be Thanatos, the god of death, whereas according to Friedrich Adolf Voigt he was a daimon of decay.

== See also ==
- Keres – Greek goddesses of violent death
- Shikome – Undead hag in Japanese mythology
- Datsue-ba – Japanese Buddhist deity
- Hell wardens – Buddhist demons, who torture the sinners in hell
- Oni#Etymology, change of meaning – Japanese mythological creatures
- Jikininki – Short story by Lafcadio Hearn
