= Minyas =

Minyas may refer to:

- Minyas (moth), a moth genus
- Minyas (mythology), the founder of Orchomenus
- Minyas (poem), a Greek epic poem
- according to Nicolas of Damascus, a region of Armenia: see Minyans
