= Ashinagatenaga =

Yokai

Ashinaga-tenaga (足長手長; "Long Legs Long Arms") are a pair of yōkai in Japanese folklore. One, Ashinaga-jin (足長人), has extremely long legs, while the other, Tenaga-jin (手長人), has extremely long arms. They were first described in the Japanese encyclopedia Wakan Sansai Zue. They are said to be found in Kyūshū.

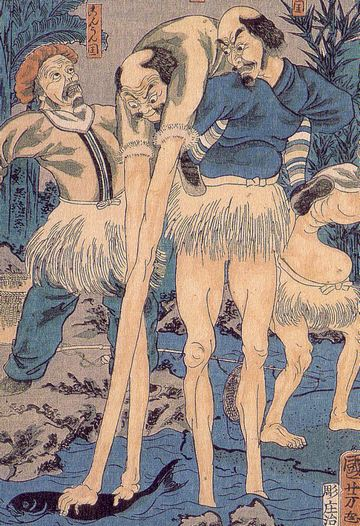
Ashinaga and tenaga fishing, ukiyo-e by Utagawa Kuniyoshi

== Description ==
The pair is commonly described as people from two countries, the "Long-legged Country", and the "Long-armed Country". As the names suggest, the inhabitants of these two countries possess unusually lengthy arms and legs. The two work together as a team to catch fish by the seashore. In order to do this, the long-armed man, tenaga, climbs onto the back of the long-legged man, ashinaga. The ashinaga then wades out into the shorewaters, staying above water with his long legs, while the tenaga uses his long arms to grab fish from his partner's back.

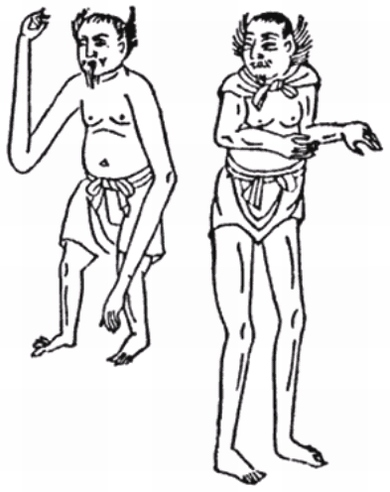
Ashinaga and tenaga from the Wakan Sansai Zue

According to the Wakan Sansai Zue, the tenaga is also known as chōhi (長臂), and his arms can reach three jō in length, or a bit over nine meters. The ashinaga's legs stretch to two jō, or just slightly over six meters.

An essay from the Kasshiyawa by Matsura Seizan also describes the ashinaga. The essay documents a man's anecdotal account of an unfortunate encounter with a strange being. The man was fishing by the seashore on a clear, moonlit night, when he spots a figure with nine shaku long legs (about 2.7 meters) roaming around on the beach. Shortly after, the weather turns bad and begins to rain heavily. The man's servant then informs him that they had just seen an ashinaga, and that sightings of this yōkai always brought bad changes in weather.

== See also ==
- List of legendary creatures from Japan
- Obake
