= Kunne cikap =

Yōkai

Kunne cikap (lit. "black bird") is a mythical bird in Ainu tradition.

== Description ==
According to tradition the kunne cikap (black bird) was the monstrous bird of the Kunne pe (Black River) in the northern parts subjugated by the hero Ponyaunpe, while the hure cicap (red bird) was the monstrous bird of the Hure kenas (Red Forest).

As for the said Black River, there is a village by the name of Kunnai (国縫/クンナイ) in Yamakoshi District, Hokkaido, about which onomastic folklore exists that connects it to the Red Bird (hure). (Note: Nakata only gives the Ainu name "Kunne-nai" as a "River of darkness", and Nakajima also only gives the Ainu name "Kunne-nai" as "River of darkness" though also mentioning the Japanese village name Kuninui-mura. A geographical dictionary explains that "Kunne-nai" corrupted to the name Kunnnai (国縫).) The Kunnai River (国縫川) also flows through the village.

Yaeko Batchelor mentions the Black Bird[s] in a waka (poem) which reads:

"Ainu child, in you lives on the blood you shed, why fear the kunne cicap-po (Note: Transliterated old style as kunne-chikap-po.) and the rest ウタリの子に 君流せし血 生きてあり などか恐れむクンネチカッポ等"

This is included in her anthology For the Young Ainu (若きウタリに, Wakaki utari ni) (1931). The bird, here called kunne cicap-po, symbolizes false images and evil according to literary commentators. This kunne cicap-po is also explained to be "black birds that flock together and peck at cadavers... yōkai birds (yōchō)" (Note: Japanese: "黒い鳥、群り集つて屍の肉をついばむ.. 妖鳥".) in Taijun Takeda's novel Mori to mizuumi no matsuri ("The Festival of the Forest and the Lake", 1957). Such an explanation recurs in commentary on the poem or the poetess by other commentators. (Note: e.g., Kisaku Yumoto 湯本喜作, chapter "Yaeko Batchelor"in Ainu no kajin アイヌの歌人, Yōyō sha, 1963. ndljp:1346726.)

== See also ==
- List of legendary creatures from Japan
