= Tsurubebi =

Fire yōkai by Toriyama Sekien

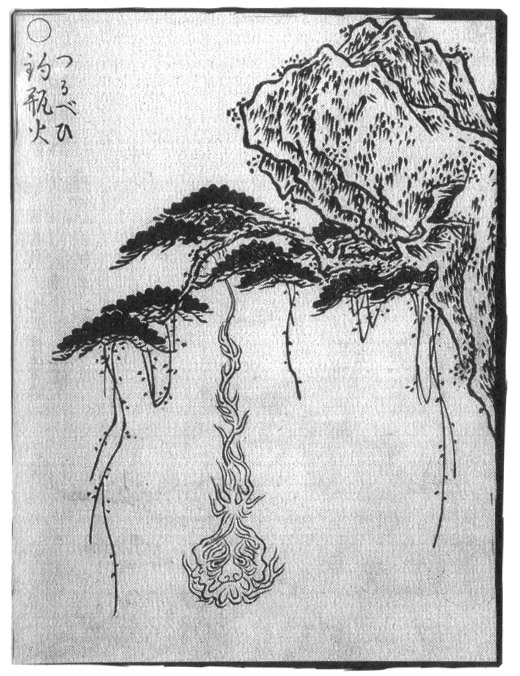
"Tsurubebi" (釣瓶火) from the Gazu Hyakki Yagyō by Toriyama Sekien

The tsurubebi (釣瓶火, "bucket fire") is a fire yōkai that appears in the Gazu Hyakki Yagyō by Toriyama Sekien.

== Concept ==
The illustration does not give any explanatory text, but according to Toriyama Sekien Gazu Hyakki Yagyō, (editor-in-chief, the literary scholar Takada Mamoru, and publisher Kokushokankokai Inc.), they are known by the other names tsurube-otoshi and tsurube-oroshi, and the original kind are the ones that are depicted in the Edo period kaidan (mysterious tale) book, the Kokon Hyaku Monogatari Hyōban, under the title of the "Nishioka no Tsurube-otoshi", where they are yōkai that appear as balls of fire. It gives the interpretation that Sekien also depicted this in the Gazu Hyakki Yagyō and titled it "Tsurubebi."

Interpretations from yōkai-related literature of the Shōwa and Heisei periods onwards almost always consider the tsurubebi to be an atmospheric ghost light that is similar to the tsurube-otoshi or as a different kind of yōkai altogether from the tsurube-otoshi. In the Shikoku and Kyushu regions, they are considered to be spirits of trees that have turned into bluish-white balls of fire that would dangle or suddenly come down from tree branches near mountain paths on quiet nights and then dangle and repeatedly go up and down like a bur, and it is said that despite being called flames, they would never burn the tree itself, sometimes faces of humans or animals would appear from within the fire. They have also been given the interpretation of being the light of bioluminescent bacteria that grow in the fungi and humus attached to tree branches.

== See also ==
- Chōchinbi
- Gazu Hyakki Yagyō
- Onibi
- Will-o'-the-wisp
