= Rōjinbi =

Japanese supernatural force

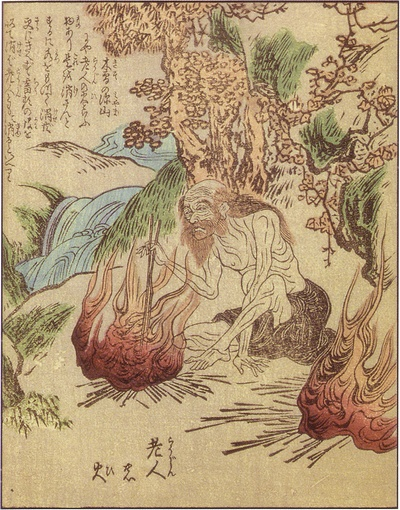
'Rōjinbi', from Takehara Shunsen's Ehon Hyaku Monogatari.

The Rōjinbi (老人火; literally, 'old person fire') or rōjin no hi (老人の火) (same meaning) is a kind of supernatural fire that appears in the Edo period bestiary Ehon Hyaku Monogatari.

== Summary ==
The rōjinbi is a demonic flame that supposedly appears deep in the mountains on rainy nights on the boundary of Shinano Province (now Nagano Prefecture) and Tōtōmi Province (now Shizuoka Prefecture). It is said to appear along with an elderly person, and cannot be extinguished by water but can be if beat with animal skins.

If, for instance, one comes across a rōjinbi on a straight stretch of road, holding one's footwear over one's head will prompt it to veer off to another path. However, if the person panics and tries to run away, it will apparently pursue them indefinitely.

It is sometimes called 'tengu no miakashi' (天狗の御燈; literally, 'tengu's lantern'), but this actually means an onibi that a tengu has lit.

Senkyō ibun (仙境異聞; literally, 'strange tales of enchanted lands'), by the late Edo period scholar Hirata Atsutane with the aid of a boy who apparently returned home safely after being abducted by tengu, claims that tengu eat fish and birds, but not other animals. Furthermore, according to the collection of writings known as Heisuiroku (秉穂録), somebody was once cooking meat in the mountains when a gigantic, seven shaku (over two metres) tall mountain priest appeared, but, despising the stench of roasting flesh, he disappeared again. The priest was assumed to be a tengu, and the tengu trait of hating beasts and meat as described in Senkyō ibun and Heisuiroku has been pointed out as being related to the rumour that rōjinbi can be put out with animal skins.

== See also ==
- List of legendary creatures from Japan

== Bibliography ==
- Tada, Katsumi (1997). Takehara Shunsen ehon hyakumonogatari tōsanjin yawa. Kokushokankokai. ISBN 978-4-336-03948-4.
