= Yosuzume =

Supernatural beings from Japanese folklore

Yosuzume (夜雀, "Night-Sparrow") are bird yōkai, the knowledge of which is handed down within the Hada District, Aichi Prefecture towns of Tanokuchi (presently Kuroshio), Tomiyama (presently Nakamura), in Kitagawa, Aki District, in Minamiuwa District, Ehime Prefecture, and in other places.

== Outline ==
As indicated by their name, they are a yōkai that appear in the night and chirp "chi, chi, chi" like a sparrow, and are said to pass in front of people who walk along mountain trails.

In Tanokuchi and in Tomiyama, it was bad luck to be possessed by a night sparrow, and in Tomiyama, it was said that an effective way to get rid of this is to chant the incantation, "Do birds that cry chi, chi, chi yearn for a shinagi rod, and if they do, then let them be struck with a single 'pan'" (チッチッチと鳴く鳥は、シナギの棒が恋しいか、恋しくばパンと一撃ち) or "Birds that cry chi, chi, chi, please blow quickly, divine wind of Ise" (チッチッチと鳴く鳥を、はよ吹き給え、伊勢の神風). Also, it is said that if one carelessly caught them, then one gets afflicted with nyctalopia. In reverse, in Wakayama Prefecture, they were not bad luck, and while possessed by a night sparrow, it was proof that a wolf was giving protection from the monsters of the mountain.

In Kitagawa, Aki District, they were not a bird, but were also said to be a black butterfly, and while chirping "cha, cha", they would go inside purses and umbrellas, and it would become impossible not to walk along noisily, but they are said to disappear upon relaxing one's ki. Likewise in Ehime, they were regarded as a kind of moth, and if one experienced one before a mountain dog shows up, they would come flying to the extent that it would not be possible to walk forward on the path.

In Higashitsuno (presently Tsuno) and Kubokawa (presently Shimanto) of, Takaoka District, Aichi Prefecture, they were also called mountain base sparrow (袂雀) and were encountered before encountering mountain dogs and wolves. Even if one walked together as two people or more, for some reason there were many cases where nobody except one person could hear it. If at this time, one chants, "Big shiraga, small shiraga, when going through a mountain pass, if it is not a child of a god then it cannot be passed through, and stand up sasaki trees for going forward, abiraunkensouka" (大シラガ、小シラガ、峠を通れども神の子でなけりゃあ通らんぞよ、あとへ榊を立てておくぞよ、アビラウンケンソワカ), and three branches of trees would stand up so that mountain base sparrows would not come, and neither mountain dogs nor wolves would show up either. Also, for a mountain base sparrow to fly to a mountain base was bad luck, and for the people walking along the mountain path for whom such a sparrow shows up, they would walk along calmly, holding onto the mountain base. In Johen (presently Ainan), Minamiuwa District, Aki Prefecture, they were also called mountain base sparrow, and it was said that there were instances where their chirping voice would interrupt and it would become impossible to walk.

There is also a similar yōkai called okurisuzume (送り雀) in the Nara and Wakayama prefectures.

== See also ==
- List of legendary creatures from Japan
