= Ningen (folklore) =

Mythical creature

Creature information
- Other name: 人間 Human in Japan
- Grouping: Sea cryptid
- Sub grouping: aquatic humanoid
- Similar entities: land Ningen
- Folklore: Japanese folklore

Origin
- First attested: "2005"
- Known for: being spotted by fishing boats
- Country: Japan
- Region: Subantarctic, Antarctica
- Habitat: deep antarctic water and ice sheets

In modern Japanese folklore, the Ningen (ニンゲン) is a humanoid whale-like or mermaid-like aquatic creature said to inhabit the subantarctic oceans and Antarctic ice sheets. The legend emerged among users of the Japanese textboard 2channel in the mid-2000s, with contributions from participants elsewhere in the world. In late 2007, the Japanese paranormal magazine Mu published an article about a mysterious white figure reportedly observed on Google Earth off the coast of Namibia, suggesting that it might be a human-shaped creature known as a ningen or hitogata. The article acknowledged the creature's origins on 2channel while also linking it to an earlier report of an unusual sighting by the crew of the research vessel Soya-maru in 1958.

== History ==
The modern story of the Ningen emerged from a 2007 post on the Japanese online forum 2channel, which described a purported encounter by the crew of a whale research vessel off the Antarctic coast. The crew initially mistook the creature for a submarine, but it reportedly disappeared beneath the waves when they approached it. Earlier imagery from Google Earth, dated to 2005, was also interpreted by some as depicting a Ningen near the Southern Ocean, although skeptics have suggested that the object was an iceberg or a beluga whale.

== Pop culture ==
In Pokémon Scarlet and Violet, a 2-stage evolution line called Cetoddle and Cetitan seemingly are both based on the Ningen. Though, nobody seems to agree upon the appearance of the Ningen.

== See also ==
- List of legendary creatures from Japan
