= Sazae-oni =

Creatures from Japanese mythology resembling large mollusks

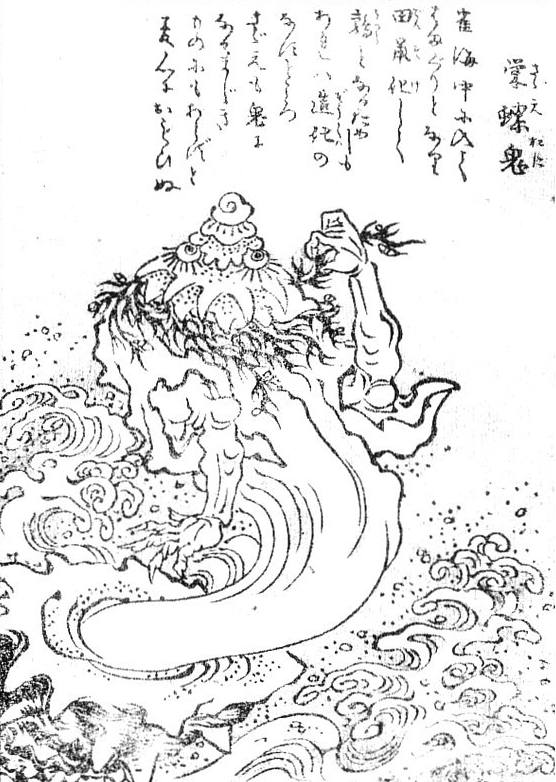
The Sazae-oni as illustrated by Toriyama Sekien

Sazae-oni (栄螺鬼, lit. shellfish ogre) are creatures from Japanese mythology, resembling large mollusks. They are a type of obake that forms when turban snails, especially Turbo sazae, reach 30 years of age.

== Mythology ==
The most popular legend of the Sazae-oni is that of a group of pirates who rescued a drowning woman from the sea and took her back to the ship. They vied for her attention, but soon found that she was willing to have sex with all of them, then cut their testicles off afterwards. The men, obviously upset, threw her into the ocean, where she revealed her true form, and bartered with the captain for their testicles back. The Sazae-oni ended up leaving with a large amount of pirate gold. Testicles are sometimes called kin-tama or "golden balls" in Japanese, so the punchline goes that gold was bought with gold. Other legends of these creatures depict them wandering into coastal or seaside inns whilst in human guise, whereupon they devour the innkeeper in the night and then escape before morning.

== See also ==
- List of legendary creatures in Japanese mythology
- Obake
- Shen (clam-monster)
