= Azukihakari =

Yōkai

Azukihakari (小豆はかり; "the bean counter") is a Japanese monster in the Ghost Story Collection of the Edo period, "Kaidan Old Staff". There is a theory that it is similar to the poltergeist phenomenon because it is a monster that makes the sound of red beans in a house without appearing, and it is a monster with only sound.

== Overview ==
In "Ghost Story Old Staff", It is stated as follows: An old man hears that yōkai appear at a friend's house in Azabu. The man said: "I want to see it" and stayed at said friend's house. As mentioned above, when the room was quiet, there was a loud noise as if stepping over the ceiling, followed by the sound of sowing beans. The sound gradually grew, and in the end, the sound was as loud as a one-tooth (about 18 litres) red bean. Eventually, the sounds of clogging and watering came from the garden outside of the house, rather than from the ceiling. The man opened the shoji immediately but said no one was in the garden. The monster may drop dirt and paper waste from the ceiling, but it does not do anything wrong.

== See also ==
- List of legendary creatures from Japan
