= Keneō =

Buddhist mythological creature

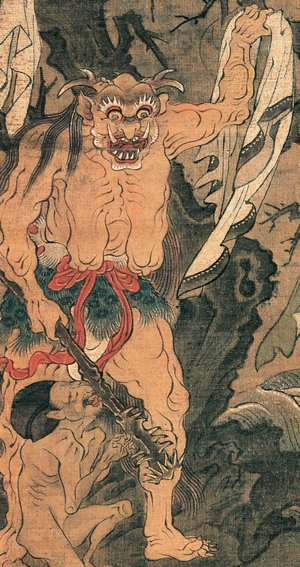
Painting of Keneō by Tosa Mitsunobu

Keneō (懸衣翁) is a Japanese Oni who sits at the edge of the Sanzu River in the Buddhist underworld. His name translates to clothes hanging old man. In Japanese tradition when someone dies 6 mon, an old form of currency, are placed with the body to be used as payment to enter the underworld. When a soul of an adult arrives at the river they are supposed to cross it. If they were good in their lifetime they are allowed to cross the bridge. If they were partially good they have to wade through the shallow section of the river. If they were bad during their life they are forced to swim across the deepest part of the river. Once the adult soul arrives at the river Datsue-ba forces the sinners to take off their clothes, and Keneō hangs these clothes on a riverside branch that bends to reflect the gravity of the sins. If a soul arrives without clothes, Keneō flays the person's skin and hangs it from the tree instead. The souls that are worst in life have clothes that weigh down the branch more because they carry more water from having to swim across the river. Various levels of punishment are then performed by the pair. For those who steal, for example, Datsue-ba breaks their fingers, and together with Keneō, she ties the sinner's head to the sinner's feet. Keneō and Datsue-ba also walk along the edge of the river and torment the souls of children that are too young to cross the river.
