= Ama-Tsu-Mara =

Blacksmith deity

Amatsumara(天津麻羅) (“one eye of heaven”) or (ironworker of heaven) also known as “Amenomahitotsu” (Heaven's Eye One Kami) is the Shinto kami of ironworking and blacksmiths. He was discussed in the Kojiki and is associated to the giant yōkai Daidarabocchi. He is also the patron kami for blacksmiths.

He acts as a blacksmith for the gods up in Takamagahara. In many versions, he made a mirror with the help of Ishikori-dome no Mikoto, which was used to lure Amaterasu from her hiding place in the rock cave of heaven.

== Name ==
The name Amatsumara means ma-ura ("eye divination"), which some believe means "one-eyed," in reference to the hazard of blacksmiths.
