= Omizunu =

Japanese deity (kami)

Genealogy
- Parents: Fukabuchi-no-Mizuyarehana, Ame-no-Tsudohechine
- Spouse: Futemimi
- Children: Ame-no-Fuyukinu

Omizunu (Japanese: 淤美豆奴神, Hepburn: Omizunu no Kami) is a Japanese deity (kami) who appears in the Izumo Fudoki where he expands Izumo Province. He is descended from Susanoo, is son of Fukabuchi-no-Mizuyarehana and Ame-no-Tsudohechine, and married to Futemimi with whom he sires Ame-no-Fuyukinu.
