= Akuma (folklore) =

Fire spirit in Japanese folklore

An akuma (悪魔(あくま)) is an evil spirit in Japanese folklore, sometimes described in English-language sources as a devil or demon. An alternative name for the akuma is ma (ま). Akuma is the name assigned to Satan in Japanese Christianity.

== History ==
The earliest uses of the word akuma are mainly found in Buddhist texts, but it also appears in literary works, especially those written during the Heian period (794–1185 AD). Later, following the introduction of Christianity to Japan, akuma became the customary way of translating the English word Satan.

== Mythology ==
An akuma is typically depicted as an entity with a fiery head and flaming eyes, and carrying a sword. It is said to be a harbinger of misfortune to those who see it. They are said to possess people and cause natural disasters.

There have been attestations of people traditionally associating mental illness with the presence of akuma.
