= Nunakawahime =

Japanese female deity (kami)

Nunakawahime (Japanese: 沼河日売) is a female Japanese deity (kami) in Shinto and spouse to Ōkuninushi. When he arrived at her home, he sang a song requesting her hand in marriage. She returned the song, and the two were married the next day.
