= Ishinagenjo =

Folkloric phenomenon in Japan

Ishinagenjo by Mizuki Shigeru

Ishinagenjo (Japanese: 石投げんじょ, "stone throwing genjo") is a folkloric phenomenon which is documented to occur in the Nishisonogi district of the Nagasaki Prefecture, the waters of Enoshima, and the city of Tosu in the Saga Prefecture.

"In the month of May, the rainy season, a group of fishermen are working at night in the midst of a thick fog. Suddenly comes the sound of a huge rock crashing into the ocean, a tremendous splash and crack that sends the boat rocking and the sailors panicking. However, there is no rock to be seen, even by the break of day."

In the Japanese Folklore Institute's book Comprehensive Lexicon of Japanese Folklore, the phenomenon is explained as being the doing of a sea monster - or yōkai (Japanese: 妖怪, variously translated as "specter", "monster", "goblin") - known as the Iso Woman or some other related sea witch. This explanation is echoed in Kunio Yanagita's book Yōkai Lectures, in which Yanagita concurs that the phenomenon is best explained by some oceanic yōkai. Because of this association, many experts have hypothesized that the "jo" - written in hiragana as "じょ" - actually means woman - represented by the kanji "女" - which is the rendering used by folklorist Sakurada Katsunori in her paper Ghost Ships and Drowning People. Written thus, Ishinagenjo (石投女) translates literally to "stone-throwing woman". The Kojien, on the other hand, renders "じょ" as "尉", meaning "captain" or "old man". The "stone-throwing old man" (石投尉) is likened in the text of the Kojien to an old man idly throwing stones into the sea. However, yōkai expert Kenji Murakami has expressed doubts regarding the existence of any documentary evidence to visually identify the creature responsible for the phenomenon described. Indeed, the Kojien notes that it is assumed that fishermen only imagine seeing a monster, but that ultimately the experience as a whole is merely an illusion.
