= Yasakatome =

Japanese deity

Yasakatome 八坂刀売神
- God of water, agriculture, hot springs, nation building
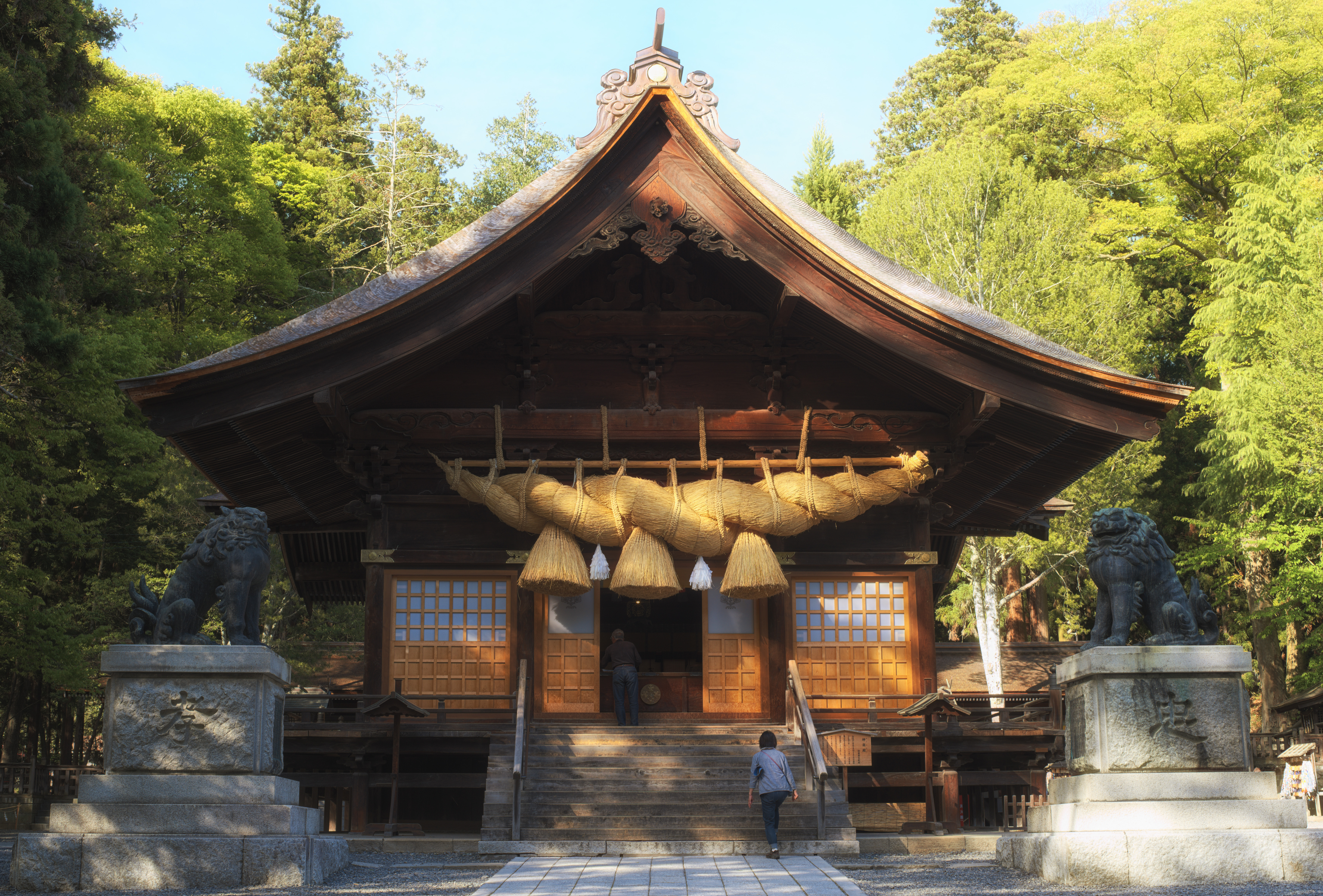
- Suwa-taisha Shimosha Akimiya Hall
- Other names: 姫大明神, 八坂刀売神, 八坂斗女命, 八坂比売命, 八坂刀自神, 八坂入姫命 等
- Major cult center: Suwa Taisha Kamisha Maemiya, Tsumashina Shrine

Genealogy
- Parents: Ōwatatsumi
- Siblings: Utsushihikanasaku
- Consort: Takeminakata
- Children: Izuhayao, Katakurabe, etc.

Yasakatome (八坂刀売神) is a kami in Shinto. She is worshipped in the Suwa Taisha network of shrines. She is the wife of Takeminakata and most often considered to be the deity of the Lower Shrine of Suwa or the Shimosha. Unlike the relatively well-documented Suwa Kamisha, very little concrete information is available regarding the origins of the Shimosha and its goddess. At Suwa Taisha Takeminakata is enshrined at Hon Miya and Yasakatome is enshrined in Mae Miya.

Yasakatome's first historical attestation is in the Shoku Nihon Kōki, where the goddess is given the rank of junior fifth, lower grade (従五位下) by the imperial court in the tenth month of Jōwa 9 (842 CE), five months after the same rank was conferred on Takeminakata. She is not found in the Kojiki or the Nihonshoki. As Takeminakata rose up in rank, so did Yasakatome, so that by 867 CE, Yasakatome had been promoted to senior second (正二位). The goddess was finally promoted to senior first rank (正一位) in 1074 (Jōhō 1).

Regarding her genealogy, according to the records of Kawaai Shrine in Kitaazumi District, Yasakatome was a younger sister of Utsushihikanasaku and the daughter of the god of the sea Ōwatatsumi which has been seen as hinting to a connection between the goddess and the seafaring Azumi clan (安曇氏). There is also a theory that Yasakatome was alternately the daughter of Ame no Yasakahiko (son of Nagashiraha no Kami, the sixth-generation descendant of Kamimusubi), a god recorded in the Sendai Kuji Hongi as one of the 32 guardians dispatched by Takamimusubi to defend Ninigi's elder brother Nigihayahi when the latter received the command to descend from Takamagahara aboard the ship Ame no Iwafune. However this theory of Yasakatome being the daughter of Yasakahiko is considered an unreliable conjecture from the Edo period that simply connected the partially similar names of Yasakatome (八坂刀売) and Yasakahiko (八坂彦) and does not have much evidence.

Local Shinto tradition of Lake Suwa holds that the ridges are formed by the gods crossing the lake when traveling between the various buildings of the Suwa Grand Shrine. Folklore says it is the guardian god of Suwa, Takeminakata-no-kami, leaving his sanctuary to meet with his wife, the goddess Yasakatome, joining the opposite bank by walking on frozen water. The ice cracks that appear on Lake Suwa during cold winters, the omiwatari (see above) are reputed in folklore to be caused by Suwa Myōjin's crossing the frozen lake to visit Yasakatome.

An alternative explanation for the word -tomi (as well as the -tome in 'Yasakatome', the name of this god's consort) is to link it with dialectal words for "snake" (tomi, tobe, or tōbe), thereby seeing the name as hinting to the god being a kind of serpentine water deity (mizuchi).

== See also ==
- Azumi people
- Suwa Daimyōjin Ekotoba
- Takeminakata
- Tenshirakami

== Bibliography ==
- Ashkenazi, Michael (2003). Handbook of Japanese Mythology. ABC-CLIO. ISBN 978-1-57607-467-1.
- Aston, George (1896). Nihongi: Chronicles of Japan from the Earliest Times to A.D. 697. London: Kegan Paul, Trench, Trübner & Co.
- Chamberlain, Basil (trans.) (1882). A Translation of the "Ko-Ji-Ki," or "Records of Ancient Matters". Yokohama: Lane, Crawford & Co.
- Fukuda, Akira; Nihonmatsu, Yasuhiro; Tokuda, Kazuo, eds. (2015). 諏訪信仰の中世―神話・伝承・歴史 (Suwa shinkō no chūsei: shinwa, denshō, rekishi). Miyai Shoten. ISBN 978-4838232888. (in Japanese)
- Grumbach, Lisa (2005). Sacrifice and Salvation in Medieval Japan: Hunting and Meat in Religious Practice at Suwa Jinja (PhD). Stanford University.
- J. Hackin (1932). Asiatic Mythology: A Detailed Description and Explanation of the Mythologies of All the Great Nations of Asia. Asian Educational Services. ISBN 978-81-206-0920-4.
- Hara, Naomasa (2012). 龍蛇神: 諏訪大明神の中世的展開 (Ryūjashin: Suwa Daimyōjin no chūseiteki tenkai). Ningensha. ISBN 978-4931388710. (in Japanese)
- Herbert, Jean (2010). Shinto: At the Fountainhead of Japan. Routledge. ISBN 978-1-136-90376-2.
- Imai, Nogiku (1960). 諏訪ものがたり (Suwa monogatari). Kōyō Shobo. (in Japanese)
- Imai, Nogiku (1976). 神々の里 古代諏訪物語 (Kamigami no sato. Kodai Suwa monogatari). Kokusho Kankōkai. (in Japanese)
- Inoue, Takami (2003). "The Interaction between Buddhist and Shinto Traditions at Suwa Shrine." In Rambellli, Fabio (August 29, 2003). Teuuwen, Mark (ed.). Buddhas and Kami in Japan: Honji Suijaku as a Combinatory Paradigm. Routledge. ISBN 978-1134431236.
- Kanai, Tenbi (1982). 諏訪信仰史 (Suwa shinkōshi). Meicho Shuppan. ISBN 978-4626001245. (in Japanese)
- Kodai Buzoku Kenkyūkai, ed. (2017). 古代諏訪とミシャグジ祭政体の研究 (Kodai Suwa to Mishaguji-saiseitai no kenkyū). 日本原初考 (Nihon gensho-kō). Vol. 1. Ningensha. ISBN 978-4908627163. (in Japanese)
- Kodai Buzoku Kenkyūkai, ed. (2017b). 古諏訪の祭祀と氏族 (Ko-Suwa no saishi to shizoku). 日本原初考 (Nihon gensho-kō). Vol. 2. Ningensha. ISBN 978-4908627163. (in Japanese)
- Kodai Buzoku Kenkyūkai, ed. (2018). 諏訪信仰の発生と展開 (Suwa shinkō no hassei to tenkai). 日本原初考 (Nihon gensho-kō). Vol. 3. Ningensha. ISBN 978-4908627170. (in Japanese)
- Miyasaka, Mitsuaki (1992). 諏訪大社の御柱と年中行事 (Suwa taisha no onbashira to nenchu-gyōji). Kyōdo shuppansha. ISBN 978-4-87663-178-0. (in Japanese)
- Miyaji, Naokazu (1931). 諏訪史 第二卷 前編 (Suwa-shi, vol. 2, part 1). Shinano kyōikukai Suwa-bukai. (in Japanese)
- Miyaji, Naokazu (1931b). 諏訪史 第二卷 後編 (Suwa-shi, vol. 2, part 2). Shinano kyōikukai Suwa-bukai. (in Japanese)
- Muraoka, Geppo (1969). 諏訪の祭神 (Suwa no saijin). Tokyo: Yūzankaku-shuppan. (in Japanese)
- Oh, Amana ChungHae (2011). Cosmogonical Worldview of Jomon Pottery. Sankeisha. ISBN 978-4-88361-924-5.
- Ōta, Akira (1926). 諏訪神社誌 第1巻 (Suwa jinja-shi: Volume 01). Nagano: Kanpei-taisha Suwa-jinja fuzoku Suwa-myōjin-kōsha. (in Japanese)
- Ōwa, Iwao (1990). 信濃古代史考 (Shinano kodaishi-kō). Tokyo: Meicho Shuppan. ISBN 978-4626013637. (in Japanese)
- Suwa, Enchū. Suwa Daimyōjin Ekotoba, in Hanawa, Hokiichi, ed. (1925). 続群書類従 第3輯ノ下 神祇部 (Zoku Gunsho Ruijū, vol. 03, part 02). Tokyo: Zoku Gunsho Ruijū Kanseikai. pp. 494–539. (in Japanese)
- Suwa Kyōikukai, ed. (1938). 諏訪史年表 (Suwa shinenpyō). Nagano: Suwa Kyōikukai.
- Suwa Shishi Hensan Iinkai, ed. (1995). 諏訪市史 上巻 原始・古代・中世 (Suwa Shishi, vol. 1: Genshi, Kodai, Chūsei). Suwa. (in Japanese)
- Tanigawa, Kenichi, ed. (1987). 日本の神々―神社と聖地〈9〉美濃・飛騨・信濃 (Nihon no kamigami: Jinja to seichi, vol. 9: Mino, Hida, Shinano). Hakusuisha. ISBN 978-4-560-02509-3. (in Japanese)
- Terada, Shizuko; Washio, Tetsuta (2010). 諏訪明神―カミ信仰の原像 (Suwa Myōjin: Kami shinkō no genzō). Iwata Shoin. ISBN 978-4-8729-4608-6. (in Japanese)
- Ueda, Masaaki; Gorai, Shigeru; Miyasaka, Yūshō; Ōbayashi, Taryō; Miyasaka, Mitsuaki (1987). 御柱祭と諏訪大社 (Onbashira-sai to Suwa Taisha). Nagano: Chikuma Shobō. ISBN 978-4-480-84181-0. (in Japanese)
- Yazaki, Takenori, ed. (1986). 諏訪大社 (Suwa Taisha). Ginga gurafikku sensho. Vol. 4. Ginga shobō. (in Japanese)
