= Shikome =

Undead hag in Japanese mythology

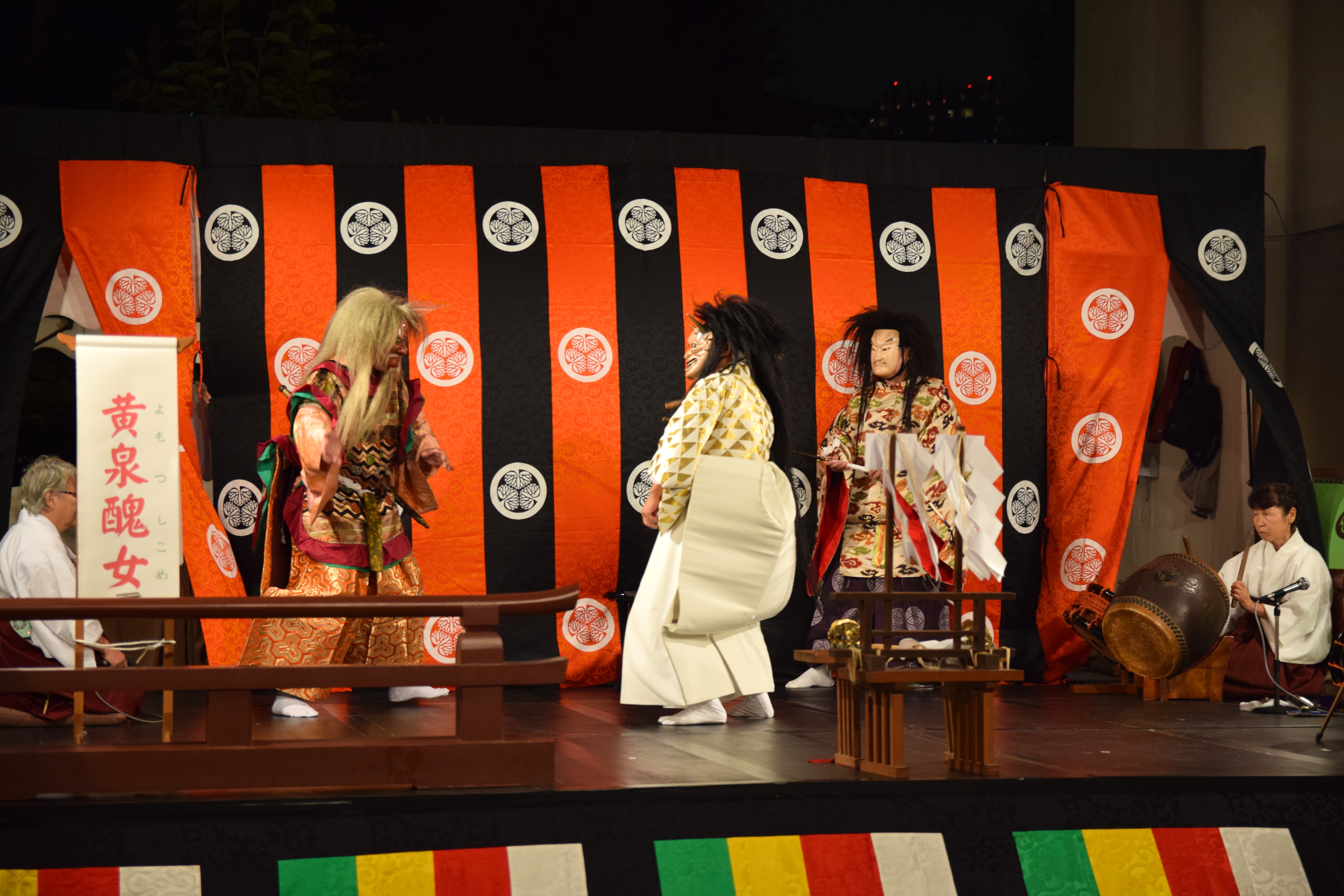

Yomotsu-shikome (黄泉醜女; lit. 'Ugly Woman of the Underworld'), in Japanese mythology, was a hag sent by the dead Izanami to pursue her husband Izanagi, for shaming her by breaking promise not to see her in her decayed form in the Underworld (Yomi-no-kuni). Also recorded by the name Yomotsu-hisame (泉津日狭女), the name may have been a term referring collectively to eight hags, not just one.

== Accounts in mythology ==
The hag appears by the Yomotsu-shikome (or Ugly-Female-of-the-Underworld") name in the eldest Japanese chronicle Kojiki. But either eight demon-hags (female oni) or a woman/women named Yomotsu-hisame hunted after Izanagi according to the Nihon Shoki, which frequently gives different readings from alternative sources.

Kojiki version

Izanagi was fleeing the Underworld with Yomotsu-shikome in hot pursuit. Izanagi first cast down his black headdress, (Note: plant woven into a wreathe (Chamberlain (1882), p. 36, note14), and used to ward off evil (Takeda (1996), p. 29 note18)) which turned into a kind of grapes (Note: ebikazura (蒲子), which is Old Japanese for yamabudō (山葡萄; Vitis coignetiae77)(Takeda (1996), p. 29 note19)) and slowed the hag's advance as she devoured them. Next he broke off his comb Yutsu-tsuma-gushi (湯津爪櫛) (Note: Izanagi earlier broke off the end of this comb to ignite the fire in order to have a light source to peek at his wife) and cast them, and the broken piece (the teeth?) turned into bamboo shoots, slowing her down again as she pulled them out and ate them. But the hag was now joined by a large army 1500 strong led by eight Thunder-deities. Izanagi brandished his Totsuka-no-Tsurugi (十拳剣) but still they pursued, until he climbed atop the "flat slope" or "Even Pass" at the entrance to the Underworld, and flung three peaches, whereby the pursuers retreated. After this, Izanami herself came in pursuit, and Izanagi blocked the entrance at the slope with a boulder.

Nihon Shoki version

Apart from the variant name and the possibility of multiple hags ("eight Ugly Females of Yomi,") are some minor discrepancies, such as the lack of mention of the Thunder god and the army and the peaches. As Izanagi reached the entrance, Izanami was already there. According to one telling, Izanagi urinated at the large tree, so that the water swelled into a river, and before Yomotsu-hisame could cross it, Izanagi reached the entrance named the "Even Pass of Yomi".

== Critical literature ==
Several commentators have pointed to the connection between the peach in this story and the general traditional belief or superstition that the peach has supernatural evil-warding powers. The symbolism of the "Peach Boy" or Momotarō that defeated the oni is often used as a familiar illustrative parallel.

== See also ==
- Aarne-Thompson Tale Type 313
- Datsue-ba – Japanese Buddhist deity
- Eurynomos – Spirit of the underworld
- Baba Yaga
- The Death of Koschei the Deathless
- Izanami
- Lampad (The Lampads or Lampades are the nymphs of the Underworld in Classical Greco-Roman mythology.)
- Oni (demon)
- Stith Thompson motif D672. Obstacle flight
- Totsuka-no-Tsurugi
