= Ame-no-ukihashi =

Japanese mythological bridge

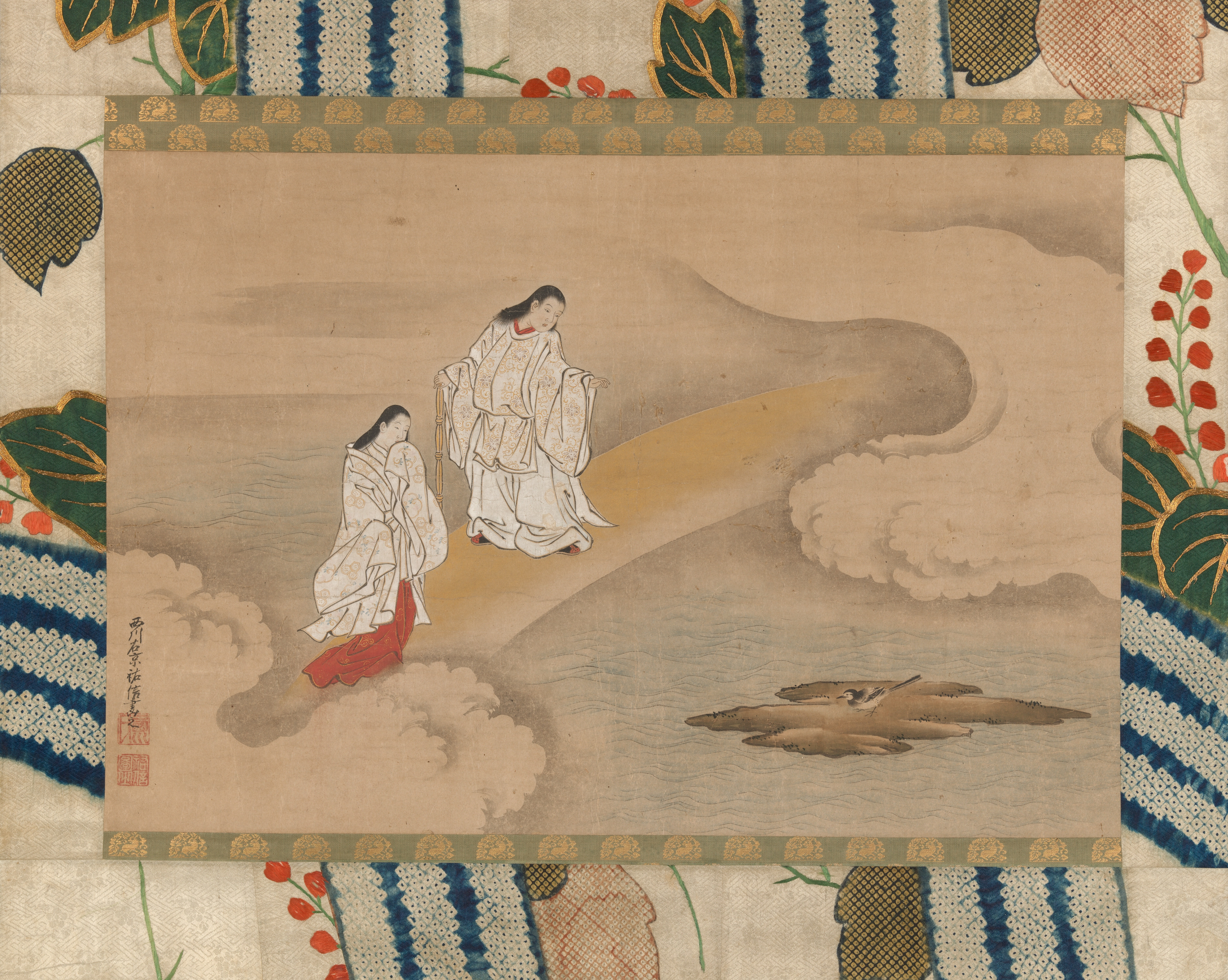
The God Izanagi and Goddess Izanami

Ame-no-ukihashi (天浮橋, 天の浮橋; English: Floating Bridge of Heaven) is the bridge that connects the heaven and the earth in Japanese mythology. In the story of the creation of the Japanese archipelago, narrated in the Kojiki and the Nihon Shoki, the gods Izanagi and Izanami stood upon this bridge while they gave form to the world. The concept of the Floating Bridge may have been inspired by the rainbow, although it has also been suggested that it represents the Milky Way.

In another story, the bridge is said to be guarded by the god Sarutahiko Ōkami, who refuses to allow Ninigi-no-Mikoto to descend to earth. Ame-no-Uzume persuades Sarutahiko to relent, and subsequently marries him.

According to the Tango Fudoki, the floating bridge eventually collapsed and fell to earth, with its remains forming the area west of Kyoto. However, the 19th-century nativist Hayashi Ōen believed the bridge had survived into modern times but was ordinarily both invisible and intangible to those who had not purified their hearts of foreign cultural influence.

== See also ==
- Bifröst
