= Kaname-ishi =

Mythological rock in Japan

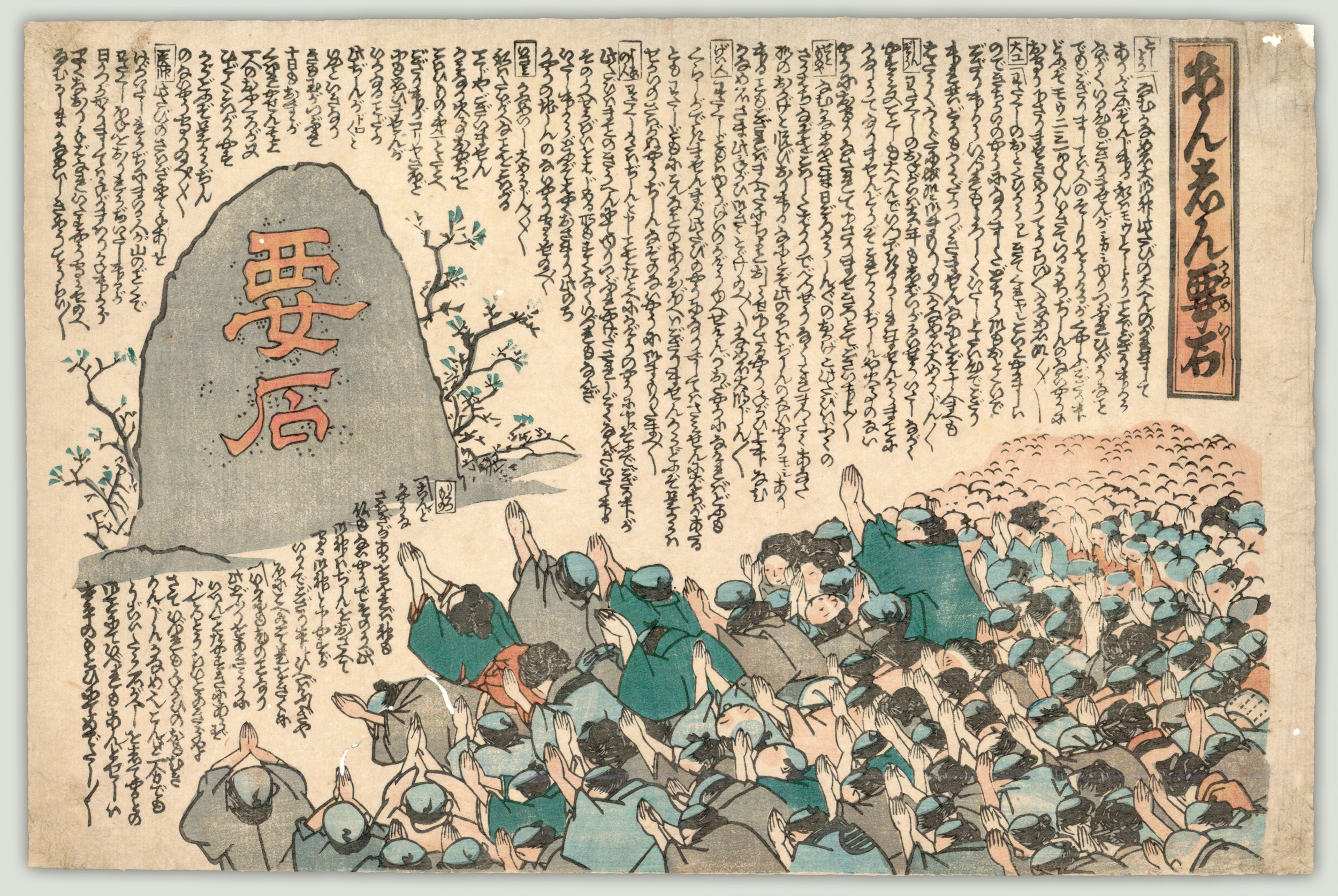
Painting of people praying at the rock for protection from earthquakes.

The kaname-ishi (Japanese: 要石; "foundation stone") of Kashima Shrine is a mythological rock said to press down on and immobilize Namazu, a massive catfish beneath Japan said to cause earthquakes.
