= Takakuraji =

Japanese mythological figure and god

Takakuraji (高倉下) is a legendary figure and kami in Shinto who appears in the legend of Jimmu's Eastern Expedition where Amaterasu and Takamimusubi visit him in a dream to bestow a sword on him, which he presents to Jimmu and his army, resulting in the return of their vitality.

He is now venerated as the kami of objects in storage, particularly grains, where he guarantees a bountiful grains. He is enshrined in Takakura Shrine in Mie Prefecture, as well as Takakura Musumiko Shrine in Nagoya.

Other names he is known by are Kumano Takakuraji no Mikoto (熊野高倉下命) and Ame no Kaguyama no Kami (天香山神).
