= Akubōzu =

Supernatural entity or spirit in Japanese folklore

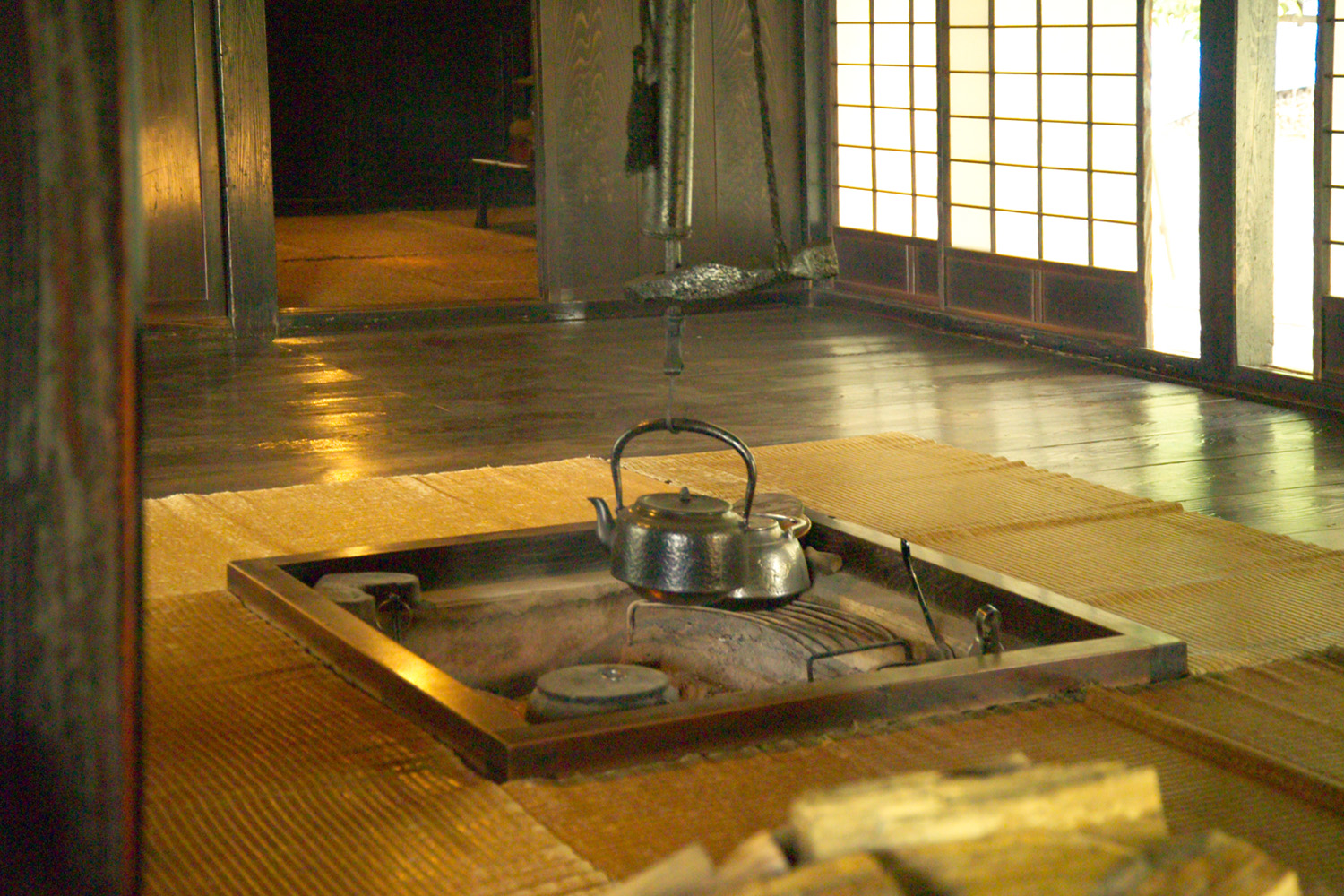
Irori (hearth)

Akubōzu (灰(あく)坊(ぼう)主(ず)) is a yōkai from Akita Prefecture and Iwate Prefecture. It is said that they live in the ash of the hearth in Senboku-gun and Ogatsu-gun in Akita Prefecture, and appear when they play with the ash.

== Analogy ==
In the Tohoku region, there are many traditions that yōkai appear when you play with ashes. In Ninohe-gun, Iwate, those who play with the ashes of the furnace are said to be drawn into the ashes by a monster called "Amanesaku" and eaten. There is a theory that this is a genie, and the one that emerges from the furnace in some parts of Fukushima Prefecture is called "Amanjak". Also, according to Kunio Yanagida's book, Tono Monogatari, a ghost called "Boko" appears in the Tono region when digging furnace ash.
