= Akugyo =

Enormous species of mermaid found in the waters surrounding Japan

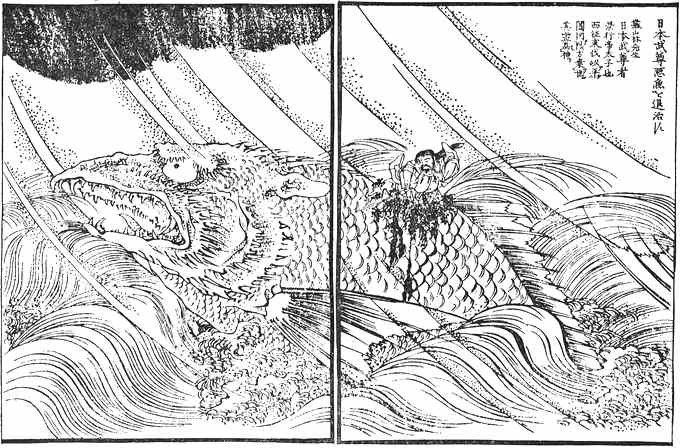
"Yamato Takeru's battle against an Akugyo" from Koura Urakawa's Kanpira Shrine Tour

Akugyo (悪魚 or 悪樓, "evil fish") or daigyo (giant fish) or raichōgyo (thunderbird fish) is a type of sea monster or aquatic yōkai in Japanese mythology.

== Overview ==
Akugyo are monstrous fish usually encountered in the seas near Kibi Province (Okayama Prefecture). They're large in size and are known to capsize entire ships, before feasting upon the drowning sailors. Some Akugyo breathe fire, while others resemble gigantic versions of Ningyo with gold and silver scales. The variety which appear as colossal mermaids usually have a pair of two white oni-like horns sprouting from their head. Fishermen fear them because their boats can easily become lodged between the fins of an Akugyo, allowing the yōkai to eat the crew.

== Lore ==
An akugyo was once sighted off the coast of Echigo Province (present-day Toyama Prefecture) in June 1805. Its body was approximately 11 meters long, and its horns measured over 60 centimeters long. This yōkai was eventually killed by Lord Matsudaira of Kaga, who sent out an armada of 1500 men and 450 cannons to slay it.

A famous taiko drummer from Kaga, Izutsuya Kanroku, was traveling across the Sea of Japan when his boat suddenly stopped moving. It had sailed over the back of an akugyo and gotten stuck. Kanroku was sure the monster would devour him. With nothing to do but wait for death, he played with all of his remaining energy. He drummed so loud that the sound traveled across the sky and throughout the sea. Soon, his boat was shaken loose from the akugyo, and he escaped unharmed.

== View more ==
- Wanpaku Ōji no Orochi Taiji - An animated movie by Toei Animation from 1963. There is a scene where Susanoo battles against an Akugyo.
