= Tsurube-otoshi =

Japanese supernatural entity

Tsurube-otoshi (釣瓶落とし) or tsurube-oroshi (釣瓶下ろし) is a yōkai told about in Kyoto Prefecture, Shiga Prefecture, Gifu Prefecture, Aichi Prefecture, and Wakayama Prefecture, among other places. They are said to drop from above the trees and attack, and even devour humans.

== Legends ==
According to the oral legend about Kuchitanba (the southern part of the Tanba region of Kyoto Prefecture) recorded in the Taishō period local research documentation book, the "Kuchitanba Kōhi Shū" (口丹波口碑集, "Collection of Oral Legends about Kuchitanba"), it is said that in the Hōki section of the village of Sogabe in Kyoto Prefecture (now Kameoka), a tsurube-oroshi would suddenly drop down from a kaya tree and make a sniggering laugh saying "has your night work ended, how 'bout let's drop a bucket, gii-gii" ("yagyō sunda ka, tsurube oroso ka, gii-gii") and then rise up above the tree again. Also, in the Tera section of Sogabe village, tsurube-oroshi are said to appear as a severed head that would drop down from an old pine tree and then eat and feed on someone and after that not appear for about two to three days, and then they would appear once again. Also, in the village of Tomimoto, Funai District, Kyoto (now Nantan), an eerie tree wrapped with ivy was feared for the appearance of tsurube-oroshi from there. In the Tsuchida section of the village of Ōi, it is also said that tsurube-oroshi would devour humans.

In the Tsukumi part of the village of Kuze, Gifu Prefecture (now Ibigawa), it is said that from above a large tree that stands in a place that's dim even at noon there would appear a tsurube-oroshi, and in Hikone of Shiga, it is said that a tsurube-oroshi from the tree's branches would catch the eye of passers-by and drop buckets.

In a Genroku period yōkai tale told about in the Kuroe part of Kainan, Wakayama Prefecture, it is said that a certain old tree would have something shining at its base when passers-by would look, and when someone would reach out to it thinking that it was a koban (coin), they would get dragged into a bucket and lifted up to above the tree where they would be menaced and then devoured by the tsurube-otoshi living there, finally losing their life as they strike the ground.

== Classics ==
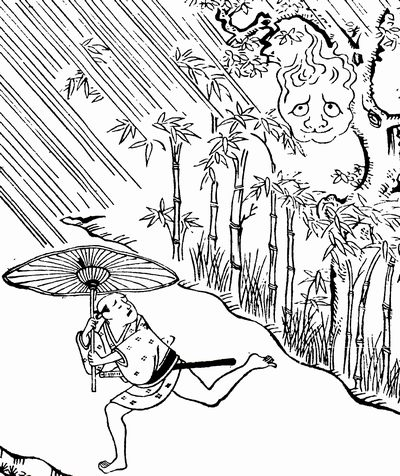
"Nishioka no Tsurube-oroshi" (The Tsurube-Oroshi of Nishioka) from the Kokon Hyakumonogatari Hyōban written by Yamaoka Genrin, edited by Yamaoka Motoyoshi

In the Edo Period collection of kaidan (mysterious tales), the Kokon Hyakumonogatari Hyōban, they are depicted under the name of "tsurube-oroshi" (釣瓶おろし) as a yōkai that is a spirit of a large tree that has turned into flames that rain down. Yamaoka Genrin, the author of this aforementioned book, states that this paranormal phenomenon of the tsurube-oroshi, referring to Wu Xing or the idea that "ki" turns into wood, fire, earth, metal, and water to make all things, can be seen to come on rainy days (water) swooping down from trees (wood) as fire (fire), and thus since they come from these phases of water, wood, and fire, they are therefore the spirits of large trees. The five phases only shift from one to another with the passage of seasons, so young trees that have still not lived long enough would not yet be filled with "ki", so they would not have their "ki" in all those phases. It is when they become large trees that the "fire" phase of their "ki" would develop, and as this fire is "yin" fire, they would appear on rainy days.

In Toriyama Sekien's Gazu Hyakki Yagyō, the ball of fire "tsurube-oroshi" of the Kokon Hyakumonogatari Hyōban would appear under the name of tsurubebi. As a result of this, from the Shōwa and Heisei periods onwards, tsurube-oroshi are stated in yōkai-related literature to be severed heads or buckets that would drop, whereas the tsurubebi on the other hand would be atmospheric ghost lights that would hang from trees and thus they would be almost always be considered different kinds of yōkai, but there is also the theory that originally both the tsurube-otoshi and the tsurubebi were similarly atmospheric ghost lights that dangle from trees like buckets.

== Similar tales ==
Though there are similar examples of yōkai like the tsurube-otoshi all across Japan, but almost always they would be paranormal phenomena without a name, and the only places where there are things known under the name of "tsurube-otoshi" are the Tōkai region and Kansai region, and furthermore it is also only in these regions that buckets are known to drop from trees, although in other places there are many that tell of dropping balls of fire or dropping burnt pans among other fire-related objects.

For example, in Yamanobe, Yamagata Prefecture, there is what is called the nabe-oroshi (鍋下ろし, "pan drop"), and it is said that when children play all the way to sunset, a deep red pan would drop from a sugi tree, take the children into the pan, and then abduct those children. In this Ashidani area of Sasayama, Tsuwano, Kanoashi District, Shimane Prefecture, there is a holy tree worshipped as the "Ōmotogami" (大元神) as well as a small shrine dedicated to it, and there are written statements about how when people attempted to cut nearby trees, torch-like fires would drop down, resulting in them getting greatly injured. In the village of Nakagawa, Kamo District, Shizuoka Prefecture (now Matsuzaki), there is a large stone among the thicket of trees, and it is said that almost every night, a hōroku pan (earthen baking pan) would drop down there. The ijiko, a yōkai of the Aomori Prefecture, is also sometimes interpreted to drop fire from the treetops.
