= Chōchinbi =

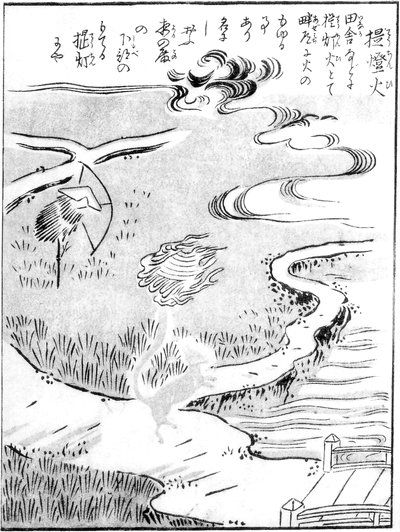
"Chōchin no hi" (提灯火) from the Konjaku Gazu Zoku Hyakki by Sekien Toriyama

Chōchinbi (提灯火) is a type of onibi, told in legends in each area of Japan.

== Overview ==
It is said to appear in footpaths between rice fields, floating about one metre (3.3 ft) above the ground, disappearing when humans get close to it. In the Tokushima Prefecture in Shikoku, witnesses are said to have observed several tens of paper lantern fires appearing at once and lining up like light bulbs. Its name comes from how it is presumed to be some kind of monster lighting up paper lanterns; it is also said to be the work of kitsune.

In Miyoshi District, Tokushima Prefecture, these chōchinbi are called "tanukibi" (狸火, lit "tanuki fire"), and as according to their name, they are considered to be a fire lit by tanuki. According to the assorted books "Shokoku Rijindan" from the Kanpō era, the tanukibi that appear in Higashitada town, Kawabe District, Settsu Province (now Kawanishi, Hyōgo Prefecture) are fire and at the same time take the shape of a human who pulled cattle, and those who do not know the situation would not notice its true form and exchange gossip with the tanukibi.

In Matsudzuka, Katsuraginoshimo District, Yamato Province (now Kashihara, Nara Prefecture), these mysterious fires are called koemonbi (小右衛門火). Mainly on rainy evenings, on the river bank, a mysterious fire about as big as a paper lantern would appear, and would float three shaku (about 90 centimetres [35 in]) above ground, and would fly around about 4 kilometres (2.5 mi) to and from the graveyard. According to collection of fantastic stories, the Toenkai by Kyokutei Bakin, when a person named Koemon attempted to uncover the true identity of it and set off towards Matsudzuka where it appears, the ball of fire appeared right in front of him and flew past him above his head. When Koemon struck it with his rod, the fire split apart into several hundred pieces and surrounded him. Koemon was surprised and was able to escape and return, but that night he fell into a fever, and without any chance to even seek medical care, he lost his life. It is said that afterwards, the mysterious fire was rumored to have caused Koemon to die from illness, and thus it began to be called the Koemonbi. Also, in another story, Koemon did not strike the mysterious fire with a rod to make it split apart, but rather the mysterious fire that flew towards Koemon made a sound like a shooting star, flew past him above his head, and then merely flew away.

In the "Otogi Tsugeshou", a ghost story from the Edo Period, in the Ōmi Province, (now Shiga Prefecture), there was a mention about the Koemonbi on rice paddy fields. According to that, an avaricious village headman named Koemon, but his bad deeds came to light and became a capital crime, and his resentment became and manifested as a mysterious flame. One time, a party of travelers who met this tried playing a flute used in ghost story called "hyūdorodoro", but the koemonbi turned towards those actors, and since a blue face floated in the middle of the fire, they thus trembled in fear and promptly fled back.
