= Minyas (poem) =

The Minyas or Minyad (Ancient Greek: Μινυάς) was the title of an early Greek epic poem, probably dating to the 6th century BC. The poem survives only in fragments. It may have concerned genealogical myths of Orchomenus, where Minyas was a legendary early ruler. However, the surviving fragments come from a description of the descent into the underworld of Theseus and Pirithous. The connection between this story and Minyas is unknown. The poem is possibly the same as one mentioned by Pausanias on the descent of Theseus and Pirithous as being attributed (though Pausanias himself is skeptical of this attribution) to Hesiod.
