= Ishikori-dome no Mikoto =

Shinto kami of mirrors

Ishikori-dome no Mikoto (石凝姥命, also 伊斯許理度売命) is a kami of mirrors in Shinto. She was regarded as an ancestral deity of Kagami zukuri no muraji (The mirror-making clans). In Japanese mythology, she created the exquisite Yata-no-kagami mirror which lures the sun goddess Amaterasu out of her cave and returns light to the world. Due to this achievement, Ishikori-dome is worshipped by makers of mirrors and stonecutters. She is worshiped as the god of casting and metalworking. She is enshrined in the Fuigo-jinja (Tennoji Ward, Osaka City), the Nakayama-jinja (Tsuyama City, Okayama Prefecture) the Kagamitsukurinimasu amaterumitama-jinja (Shiki-gun, Nara Prefecture), Iwayama-jinja (Niimi City, Okayama Prefecture).
