= Datsue-ba =

Japanese Buddhist deity

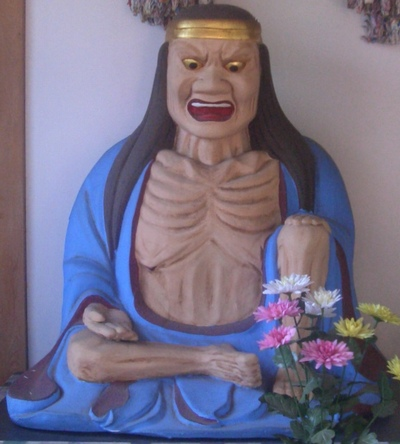
A statue of Datsue-ba in Kawaguchi, Saitama

Datsueba (奪(だつ)衣婆(えば); lit. "old woman who strips clothes") is often depicted sitting by the Sanzu River (三(さん)途(ず)の川(かわ); lit. River of Three Crossings) in literary, visual, and religious depictions of the Buddhist underworld. Although Buddhist hell is imagined in a great number of texts and images ranging from places such as China, India, and Tibet, Datsueba appears to be unique to Japanese iterations of Buddhist hell. Throughout these depictions, Datsueba is broadly imagined and illustrated as an old, frightening ogress who takes the clothes from the deceased as they cross the Sanzu River.

== Literary Depictions ==
The first mentions of Datsueba date back to eleventh-century Japanese scriptures and religious stories. The earliest of which is likely the Hokke genki, which was composed by Chingen the Tendai monk between 1040 and 1044. In "Renshū hōshi", one of the 129 tales within the Hokke genki, a Datsueba-like figure sits by the side of a river beneath a tree whose branches are draped in clothes. The woman is described as old and ugly, and demands Renshu, a Daigoji monk who died from illness, to strip off his clothes and cross the river. Similar iterations of this story can be found in other texts from this period, including Konjaku monogatari shū (Anthology of Tales from the Past) and the Kannon riyaku shū (Anthology of the Benefits of Kannon). In these texts, Datsueba is unnamed and referred to simply as oni (ogre) or ouna no oni (old female ogre), but the descriptions of the female ogre's physicality and locale by the Sanzu river are very similar, and also resemble future iterations of a more solidified, established notion of Datsueba.

Datsueba also appears in the Jizō jūō kyō, which is a text of Japanese origin based on the Chinese Scripture on the Ten Kings. In this depiction, Datsueba waits on the far side of a river as spirits who lack the virtue to be permitted to cross the river via bridge are forced to wade their way across the treacherous waters. The Jūō santanshō, a commentary on the Jizō jūō kyō, offers a more detailed description of the nature of the river crossing. This text describes that there are in fact three possible passages across the river, sensuise (shallow water), kyōto (bridge), and kyōjinse (strong and deep currents). The latter of the three is reserved for those who have accumulated a great number of bad deeds in their life, while those guilty only of minor bad deeds are allowed to wade across the shallows, and the virtuous spirits are permitted to cross the Sanzu River via bridge, avoiding the waters entirely. In the Jizō jūō kyō, Datsueba and her male counterpart, Ken’e-ō, reside beneath an Eryōju (Cloth-Hanging Tree). When the spirits reach the far side of the river, Datsueba strips the spirits of their clothes, which she then passes to Ken’e-ō who hangs the garments on the branches of the Eryōju and judges the severity of their sins by the weight of the clothes and how much water they absorbed during the spirit's crossing.

Several Buddhist texts that quote from the Jizō jūō kyō also include depictions of Datsueba, including the Futsū shōdō shū (Anthology of Basic Materials for Instructing People in Buddhism), and Jishu hyaku innen shū (Personal Selection of One Hundred Tales Concerning Retribution). In these texts, Datsue-ba is also referred to with various epithets, such as baki (hag), oni (ogre), Sanzu kawa no ouna (old woman of the Sanzu River), Ken’e-u, and Datsueki (Cloth-Taking Ogre). Notably, The Jishu hyaku innen shū and the Jōdo kenbun shū, other Buddhist texts that quote from the Jizō jūō kyō, offer slightly different descriptions of Datsueba. These two in particular describe Datsueba as stripping the skin off of spirits who do not have any clothes to take.

== Visual Depictions ==
Rokudō jūō zu are sets of paintings that began to be produced during the thirteenth century in Japan that depict motifs of Ten Kings and the Six Realms. Datsueba appears in some of these hanging painted scrolls in a similar manner to how she was described in the Jizō jūō kyō, sitting beneath a tree by the Sanzu River between the first and second courts of the Ten Kings. In the Jikkaizu (Painting of the Ten Worlds), a thirteenth-century Rokudō jūō zu and one of the earliest known visual depictions of Datsueba, she appears on the second of two scrolls positioned beside the gate to hell. This greatly differs from her depiction in the literary Jizō jūō kyō, in which Datsueba is involved in the hanging of spirit's clothes, which was part of the judicial process of evaluating the severity of the deceased's worldly bad deeds.

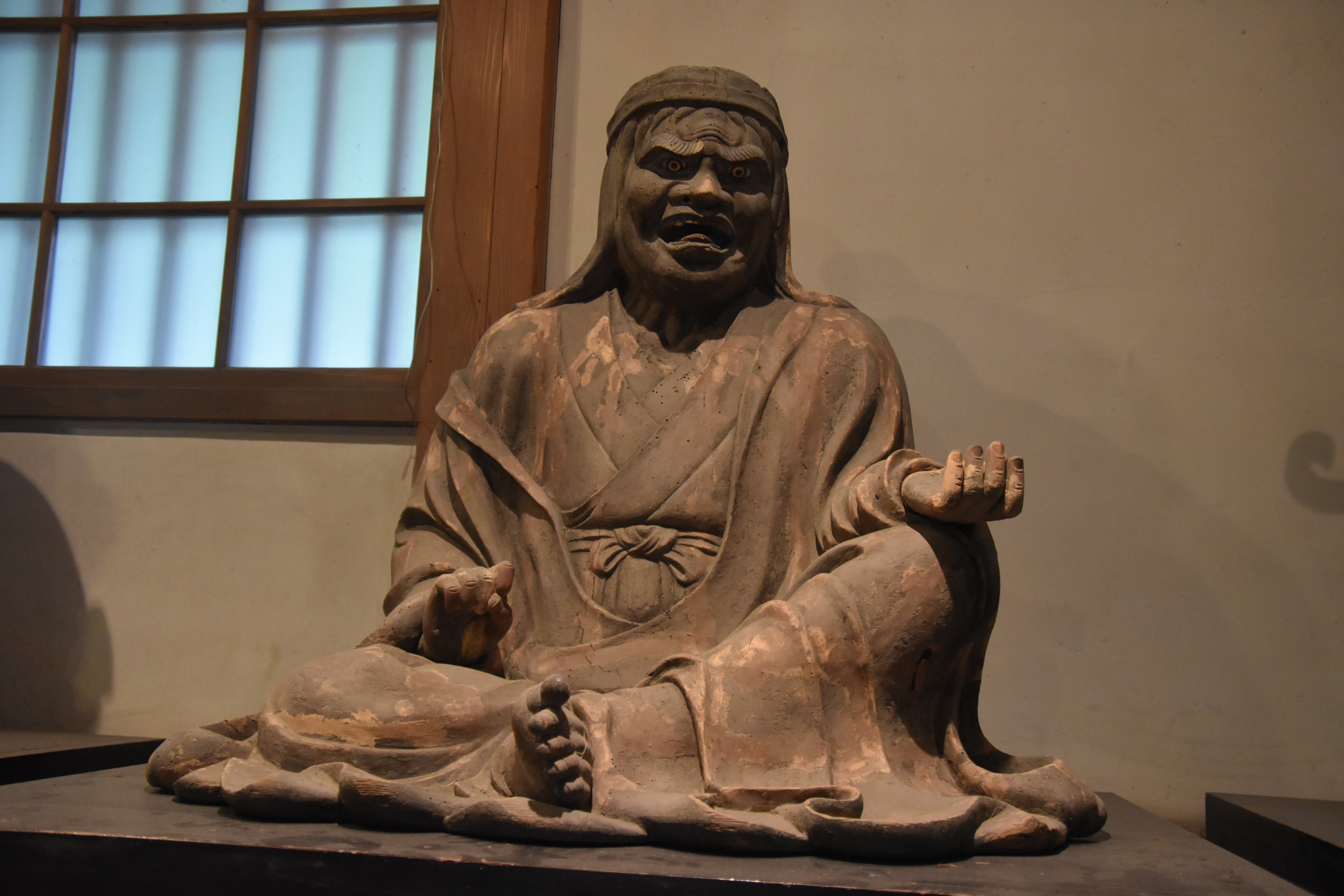
A wooden statue of Datsue-ba at Ennō-ji Temple, c. 1514.

Datsue-ba also appears on a Pilgrimage Mandala at Zenkoji temple in Nagano city. The mandala features twin images of Datsueba sitting near a tree strewn with white cloths. These twin images are positioned by the middle gate to the main worship hall, thus pointing pilgrims towards the most sacred site. This depiction of twin images of Datsueba is rare and likely unique to the Zenkoji Pilgrimage Mandala. At Zenkoji, pilgrims often undergo a ritual rebirth, kaidan meguri (lit. traversing the ordination platform) wherein worshippers pass through a pitch black tunnel beneath the temple's main hall while feeling for an iron lock which is meant to establish a principle connection with the main Buddha of Zenkoji. Considering that Datsueba is frequently associated with gates and boundaries between life and death, positioning her images as such might suggest her as serving the role of gatekeeper marking both a transition between sacred areas of the temple, as well as a between the realm of the living and the dead.

During the Kaei era (1848-1854), Datsueba took on a drastically different presentation through a statue of her at the Shōjuin temple in the city of Edo. This statue garnered widespread popularity due to the belief that it retained the power to grant wishes and worldly benefits to worshippers who visited the statue. This statue's likeness was depicted in the form of nishiki-e woodblock print responding to the sudden craze around the Shōjuin Detsueba, but the artist Utagawa Kuniyoshi (1798– 1861) chose to portray her in a manner that greatly differed from that of traditional Buddhist visual depictions. Rather, Utagawa Kuniyoshi depicted Detsueba as blue skinned and clothed in a yellow robe. This new visual portrayal reflected the belief behind the Shōjuin Datsueba as a granter of wishes rather than a frightening hag in hell who is responsible for sinful spirits.

== See also ==
- Shikome – Undead hag in Japanese mythology
- Eurynomos – Spirit of the underworld
- Lampad – Torch-bearing nymphs of the goddess Hecate
