= Ame-no-Fuyukinu =

Japanese deity

- Major cult centre: Hinomisaki Shrine

Genealogy
- Consort: Sashikuniwaka-hime
- Children: Ōkuninushi

Ame-no-Fuyukinu (Japanese: 天之冬衣神) is a figure of Japanese legend said to be a fifth generation descendent of Susanoo, married to Sashikuniwaka-hime, and father of Ōkuninushi. Legend has it that Susanoo ordered him to deliver a sword to Takamagahara and that he founded Hinomisaki Shrine, while the Ono clan claim descent from him.
