= Shidaidaka =

Yōkai of the Chūgoku region

Shidaidaka (次第高) are a yōkai of the Chūgoku region.

== Summary ==
They are told about in the Tottori Prefecture, in Niyomiya, Atoichi, and Tsunozu of Gōtsu, Shimane Prefecture, Iwakuni, Asa District, and Abu District of Yamaguchi Prefecture, the Hiroshima Prefecture, the Okayama Prefecture, etc.

It is a humanoid yōkai that appears above roads, and when those that see it look up, the shidaidaka would accordingly grow taller. In reverse, if one looks down it becomes shorter, but if one doesn't look down, it would steadily grow taller.

Therefore, if one ever meets a Shidaidaka, then one must never look up. In reverse, if one looks further and further downwards, the shidaidaka would steadily become smaller, and then disappear. In Sakurae, Ōchi District, Shimane Prefecture (now Gōtsu), in a place called Kawato, when a shidaidaka appears, one must never look at it from beneath one's thighs. It is a type of mikoshi-nyūdō, and is thus of the same type as the taka-nyūdō, the nyūdō-bōzu, the nobiagari, etc.

According to a folktale in Hazumi, Ōchi, Shimane Prefecture, it is said that when one goes out on a hunt, whatever spoils one gets, it is best to leave at least one last bullet to prepare for when a shidaidaka would appear in order to kill it. In Matsukawa, Gōtsu, Shidaidaka are also said to be the boss of nekomata, and when a certain hunter went to bring down a shidaidaka, its true form was, as thought, a nekomata.

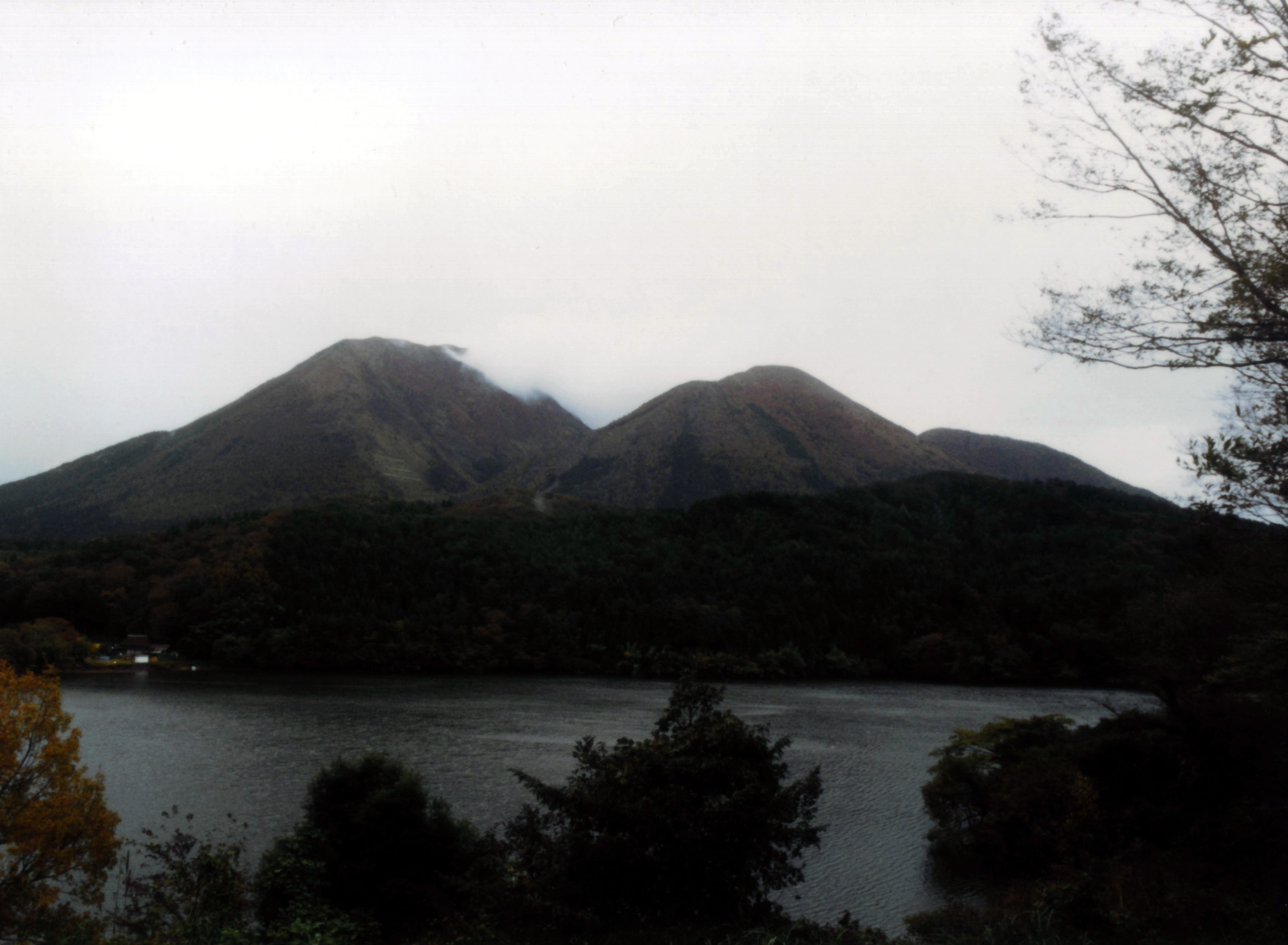
Sanbe Mountain, Shimane Prefecture where the shidaizaka is told about

Also, in the Shimane Prefecture, there is also a legend about a strange occurrence that has a similar name, the "shidaizaka" ("しだい坂"). When a person walks on a path towards Sanbe Mountain, the path steadily becomes more inclined, and when someone becomes surprised and looks upward, the entire hill becomes larger, and thus traps that person, but there is a theory that this legend comes from the shidaidaka, with changes in its name and content.

== See also ==
- List of legendary creatures from Japan
