= List of GeGeGe no Kitarō episodes =

The GeGeGe no Kitarō anime, based on the manga series of the same name by Shigeru Mizuki, was produced by Toei Animation and aired on Fuji TV.

== Series overview ==
Since the premiere of the first animated adaptation in 1968, a new anime series has been produced in each decade, with 6 adaptations so far.

In 2008, while the 5th anime series was still being aired, a new anime based on the original "Hakaba Kitarō" manga stories was aired. It ran for 11 episodes from January 10 to March 20. According to Toei Animation, this adaptation is not considered part of "GeGeGe no Kitaro" franchise.

=== GeGeGe no Kitarō series ===
No.	Run	Episodes	Series direction
1	January 3, 1968 –March 30, 1969	65	
2	October 7, 1971 –September 28, 1972	45	
3	October 12, 1985 –March 21, 1988	115	Osamu Kasai, Hiroki Shibata
4	January 7, 1996 –March 29, 1998	114	Daisuke Nishio
5	April 1, 2007 – March 29, 2009	100	Yukio Kaizawa
6	April 1, 2018 – March 29, 2020	97	Kōji Ogawa
Total	1968–2020	536	-

=== Hakaba Kitarō ===
No.	Run	Episodes	Series direction
1	January 10, 2008 – March 20, 2008	11	Kimitoshi Chioki

== Episodes ==
=== 1968 ===
No.	Title	Directed by	Written by	Animation directed by	Art directed by	Original release date
1	"Ghost Nighter"; Transliteration: "Obake Nightaa" (Japanese: おばけナイター)	Yasuo Yamaguchi	Masaki Tsuji	Hiroshi Wagatsuma	Saburō Yokoi	January 3, 1968
A kid named Donpei walked through a graveyard and finds a baseball bat on the ground with some funny writing on it. He swings it for fun and finds that anything he hits always lands where he wants. He becomes famous at school for always hitting home-runs. This bat belongs to a Youkai baseball team and this team asks Kitaro to get the bat back from the humans. Kitaro explains to the human kids they need the bat back but they won't. Kitaro offers a Baseball game at 3am to settle the issue; if the Humans win the Youkai will give up on the bat and if the Youkai win the human kids will have to give up their lives. Donpei's team accepts. The games is canceled before the game finished because the Youkai don't want to be caught in the sun. The issue is settled with the Youkai getting their bat back while the humans keep their lives.
2	"Yaksha"; Transliteration: "Yasha" (Japanese: 夜叉)	Yoshio Kuroda	Susumu Takaku	Teruo Hosoda	Hideo Chiba	January 10, 1968
Yasha is a demon that steals children's souls. It lures children to it by possessing a person and plays hypnotizing music on a guitar. The souls are stored in balloons to be eaten later. Yasha's true form is hair. Kitaro's soul gets stolen as well but his father brings his soul back to him before he is killed. In a fight with Yasha, Kitaro calls for his Youkai Lamp (a fire spirit) and burns Yasha to death. The souls of the children are returned.
3	"Youkai Castle"; Transliteration: "Youkai Jou" (Japanese: 妖怪城)	Tokue Shirane	Motonari Wakai	Masamune Ochiai	Shigeyoshi Endō	January 17, 1968
The seal on a youkai castle is taken off by Nezumi-otoko [Rat-man] and the youkai from the castle requests children from a village to be given to the castle once a month to turn them into youkai. Kitaro happens to be walking by and offers to help. Kitaro asks to borrow one girl to be bait for the bad youkai. Nezumi-otoko comes to get the girl which surprises Kitaro because they know each other. Nezumi-otoko is known to be greedy and not care for anyone other than himself and is only helping the youkai of the castle for fun. The girl gets taken from Kitaro. Kitaro gets in a series of fights with the Youkai of the castle. In the end he is flattened and his chanchanko [his magic vest] is taken by Nezumi-otoko. Kitaro channels his mind into the chanchanko and threatens to suffocate Nezumi-otoko remotely and makes him re-seal the castle. Kitaro becomes un-flattened with help from his father and saves the girl before morning.
4	"Vampire La Seine [?]"; Transliteration: "Kyuuketsuki Ra・Seenu" (Japanese: 吸血鬼ラ・セーヌ)	Yoshio Takami	Shun'ichi Yukimuro	Shinya Takahashi	Shigeyoshi Endō	January 24, 1968
5	"Great Sea Beast"; Transliteration: "Daikaijuu" (Japanese: 大海獣)	Hiroshi Shidara	Masaki Tsuji	Minoru Tajima	Makoto Yamazaki	January 31, 1968
6	"Great Sea Beast"; Transliteration: "Daikaijuu" (Japanese: 大海獣)	Hiroshi Shidara	Masaki Tsuji	Minoru Tajima	Makoto Yamazaki	February 7, 1968
7	"Ghost Train"; Transliteration: "Yūrei densha" (Japanese: ゆうれい電車)	Shizuo Murayama	Michio Suzuki	Yukiyoshi Hane	Makoto Yamazaki	February 14, 1968
8	"Old Man of the Mirror [?]"; Transliteration: "Kagami Jijii" (Japanese: 鏡爺)	Masayuki Akehi	Toyohiro Andō	Hideo Furusawa	Makoto Yamazaki	February 21, 1968
9	"The Look-up Priest [?]"; Transliteration: "Miage-nyūdō" (Japanese: 見上げ入道)	Tokue Shirane	Shun'ichi Yukimuro	Masamune Ochiai	Hideo Chiba	February 28, 1968
10	"Great Youkai War"; Transliteration: "Yōkai daisensō" (Japanese: 妖怪大戦争)	Kazukiyo Shigeno	Shun'ichi Yukimuro	Akinori Ōrai	Hideo Chiba	March 6, 1968
11	"Great Youkai War"; Transliteration: "Yōkai daisensō" (Japanese: 妖怪大戦争)	Kazukiyo Shigeno	Shun'ichi Yukimuro	Akinori Ōrai	Hideo Chiba	March 13, 1968
12	"The Youkai Nurarihyon"; Transliteration: "Yōkai Nurarihyon" (Japanese: 妖怪ぬらりひょん)	Nobutaka Nishizawa	Toyohiro Andō	Shinya Takahashi	Saburō Yokoi	March 20, 1968
13	"Hell Cruise"; Transliteration: "Jigoku nagashi" (Japanese: 地獄流し)	Takashi Hisaoka	Michio Suzuki	Hiroshi Wagatsuma	Shigeyoshi Endō	March 27, 1968
14	"Water Tiger"; Transliteration: "Suiko" (Japanese: 水虎)	Shizuo Murayama	Susumu Takaku	Hideo Furusawa	Saburō Yokoi	April 7, 1968
15	"Vampire Elite"; Transliteration: "Kyūketsuki eriito" (Japanese: 吸血鬼エリート)	Yoshio Kuroda	Michio Suzuki	Shinya Takahashi	Shigeyoshi Endō	April 14, 1968
16	"Vampire Elite"; Transliteration: "Kyūketsuki eriito" (Japanese: 吸血鬼エリート)	Yoshio Kuroda	Michio Suzuki	Shinya Takahashi	Shigeyoshi Endō	April 21, 1968
17	"Cat Hermit"; Transliteration: "Neko sennin" (Japanese: 猫仙人)	Yasuo Yamaguchi	Shun'ichi Yukimuro	Hiroshi Wagatsuma	Saburō Yokoi	April 28, 1968
18	"Witch Doll"; Transliteration: "Majo ningyō" (Japanese: 魔女人形)	Shizuo Murayama	Toyohiro Andō	Masamune Ochiai	Makoto Yamazaki	May 5, 1968
19	"Blood Sucking Tree"; Transliteration: "Kyūketsu ki" (Japanese: 吸血木)	Tokue Shirane	Masaki Tsuji	Masamune Ochiai	Shigeyoshi Endō	May 12, 1968
20	"Cat-girl and Rat-man"; Transliteration: "Neko musume to nezumi otoko" (Japanese: 猫娘とねずみ男)	Yoshio Takami	Shun'ichi Yukimuro	Hideo Furusawa	Hideo Chiba	May 19, 1968
21	"Youkai Beast"; Transliteration: "Yōkai-jū" (Japanese: 妖怪獣)	Masayuki Akehi	Susumu Takaku	Teruo Hosoda	Hideo Chiba	May 26, 1968
22	"Youkai Beast"; Transliteration: "Yōkai-jū" (Japanese: 妖怪獣)	Masayuki Akehi	Susumu Takaku	Teruo Hosoda	Hideo Chiba	June 2, 1968
23	"Youkai of the Pass"; Transliteration: "Tōge no yōkai" (Japanese: 峠の妖怪)	Tokue Shirane	Masaki Tsuji	Masamune Ochiai	Shigeyoshi Endō	June 9, 1968
24	"Hakusanbo"; Transliteration: "Hakusanbō" (Japanese: 白山坊)	Takashi Hisaoka	Shun'ichi Yukimuro	Hideo Furusawa	Saburō Yokoi	June 16, 1968
25	"Electric Youkai"; Transliteration: "Denki yōkai" (Japanese: 電気妖怪)	Yoshio Takami	Toyohiro Andō	Teruo Hosoda	Hideo Chiba	June 23, 1968
26	"Boss of the Sea"; Transliteration: "Umi zatō" (Japanese: 海座頭)	Shizuo Murayama	Michio Suzuki	Akinori Ōrai	Hideo Chiba	June 30, 1968
27	"Creepy Mane"; Transliteration: "Odoro-odoro" (Japanese: おどろおどろ)	Tokue Shirane	Michio Suzuki	Masamune Ochiai	Hideo Chiba	July 7, 1968
28	"The Pillow Switcher"; Transliteration: "Makura-gaeshi" (Japanese: まくら返し)	Shizuo Murayama	Masaki Tsuji	Yoshitsugu Nabeshima	Hideo Chiba	July 14, 1968
29	"Mirror Battle [?]"; Transliteration: "Kagami kassen" (Japanese: 鏡合戦)	Nobutaka Nishizawa	Shun'ichi Yukimuro	Akinori Ōrai	Hideo Chiba	July 21, 1968
30	"Devil Belial"; Transliteration: "Akuma beriaru" (Japanese: 悪魔ベリアル)	Shizuo Murayama	Michio Suzuki	Masamune Ochiai	Hideo Chiba	July 28, 1968
31	"Moryo"; Transliteration: "Mōryō" (Japanese: もうりょう)	Fusahiro Nagaki	Toyohiro Andō	Hiroshi Wagatsuma	Hideo Chiba	August 4, 1968
32	"Youkai Flower"; Transliteration: "Yōka" (Japanese: 妖花)	Tokue Shirane	Masaki Tsuji	Tsuguyuki Kubo	Hideo Chiba	August 11, 1968
33	"Turban Shell Demon"; Transliteration: "Sazae-oni" (Japanese: さざえ鬼)	Hideo Furusawa	Shun'ichi Yukimuro	Jōji Kikuchi	Hideo Chiba	August 18, 1968
34	"Plate Boy"; Transliteration: "Sara-kozō" (Japanese: さら小僧)	Takashi Hisaoka	Masaki Tsuji	Teruo Hosoda	Saburō Yokoi	August 25, 1968
35	"Top Youkai"; Transliteration: "Koma Yōkai" (Japanese: こま妖怪)	Tokue Shirane	Michio Suzuki	Masamune Ochiai	Hidenobu Hata	September 1, 1968
36	"Diamond Youkai"; Transliteration: "Daiyamondo yōkai" (Japanese: ダイヤモンド妖怪)	Masayuki Akehi	Toyohiro Andō	Hiroshi Wagatsuma	Hideo Chiba	September 8, 1968
37	"Eyes on Hand"; Transliteration: "Tenome" (Japanese: 手の目)	Shizuo Murayama	Toyohiro Andō	Masamune Ochiai	Tadami Shimokawa	September 15, 1968
38	"Folding Monk"; Transliteration: "Oritatami-nyūdō" (Japanese: おりたたみ入道)	Hideo Furusawa	Shun'ichi Yukimuro	Fumio Eto	Saburō Yokoi	September 22, 1968
39	"Youkai Corps"; Transliteration: "Yōkai Gundan" (Japanese: 妖怪軍団)	Hiroshi Shidara	Michio Suzuki	Akinori Ōrai	Saburō Yokoi	September 29, 1968
40	"Youkai of Obebe Swamp"; Transliteration: "Obebe-numa no Yōkai" (Japanese: おベベ沼の妖怪)	Tokue Shirane	Michio Suzuki	Masamune Ochiai	Tadami Shimokawa	October 6, 1968
41	"Cat Ghoul"; Transliteration: "Bakeneko" (Japanese: ばけ猫)	Kazukiyo Shigeno	Michio Suzuki	Fumio Eto	Hidenobu Hata	October 13, 1968
42	"The Man Eating Island"; Transliteration: "Hitogui-jima" (Japanese: 人食い島)	Masayuki Akehi	Shun'ichi Yukimuro	Hiroshi Wagatsuma	Saburō Yokoi	October 20, 1968
43	"God of Drought"; Transliteration: "Hiderigami" (Japanese: ひでりがみ)	Yasuo Yamaguchi	Toyohiro Andō	Akinori Ōrai	Saburō Yokoi	October 27, 1968
44	"Sandal Battle"; Transliteration: "Geta Kassen" (Japanese: げた合戦)	Tokue Shirane	Shun'ichi Yukimuro	Masamune Ochiai	Saburō Yokoi	November 3, 1968
45	"The No Face"; Transliteration: "Noppera-bō" (Japanese: のっぺらぼう)	Hideo Furusawa	Shun'ichi Yukimuro	Fumio Eto	Saburō Yokoi	November 10, 1968
46	"Birthing Woman Ghost"; Transliteration: "Ubume" (Japanese: うぶめ)	Takashi Hisaoka	Toyohiro Andō	Teruo Hosoda	Shigeyoshi Endō	November 17, 1968
47	"Amanojaku"; Transliteration: "Amanojaku" (Japanese: 天邪鬼)	Tomoharu Katsumata	Shun'ichi Yukimuro	Masamune Ochiai	Hidenobu Hata	November 24, 1968
48	"Snow Woman"; Transliteration: "Yukin-ko" (Japanese: 雪ん子)	Masayuki Akehi	Masaki Tsuji	Hiroshi Wagatsuma	Hidenobu Hata	December 1, 1968
49	"Tenko"; Transliteration: "Tenko [?]" (Japanese: 天狐)	Kazuya Miyazaki	Toyohiro Andō	Jōji Kikuchi	Saburō Yokoi	December 8, 1968
50	"Youkai Sekigahara"; Transliteration: "Yōkai Sekigahara" (Japanese: 妖怪関ケ原)	Yoshikata Nitta	Masaki Tsuji	Akinori Ōrai	Hidenobu Hata	December 15, 1968
51	"Mine Shaft Monk"; Transliteration: "Anagura-nyūdō" (Japanese: 穴ぐら入道)	Yasuo Yamaguchi	Michio Suzuki	Hiroshi Wagatsuma	Saburō Yokoi	December 22, 1968
52	"Vampire Youkai Corps"; Transliteration: "Kyūketsu Yōkai-dan" (Japanese: 吸血妖怪団)	Yoshio Takami	Toyohiro Andō	Seishi Hayashi	Tadami Shimokawa	December 29, 1968
53	"Youkai President"; Transliteration: "Yōkai Daitōryō" (Japanese: 妖怪大統領)	Yasuo Yamaguchi	Hiroshi Ozawa	Teruo Hosoda	Masahiro Ioka	January 5, 1969
54	"Youkai Rally"; Transliteration: "Yōkai Rarii" (Japanese: 妖怪ラリー)	Tomoharu Katsumata	Shun'ichi Yukimuro	Masamune Ochiai	Hidenobu Hata	January 12, 1969
55	"Youkai Fuzzy Hair"; Transliteration: "Yōkai Keukegen" (Japanese: 妖怪毛羽毛現)	Nobutaka Nishizawa	Masaki Tsuji	Minoru Tajima	Hidenobu Hata	January 19, 1969
56	"Seashore Woman"; Transliteration: "Iso-onna" (Japanese: 磯女)	Hideo Furusawa	Hiroshi Ozawa	Shinnosuke Kon	Tadami Shimokawa	January 26, 1969
57	"Invisible Magic"; Transliteration: "Ongyō Mahō" (Japanese: 隠形魔法)	Hiroshi Shidara	Shun'ichi Yukimuro	Akinori Ōrai	Masahiro Ioka	February 2, 1969
58	"Hazy Cart"; Transliteration: "Oboro-guruma" (Japanese: おぼろぐるま)	Tomoharu Katsumata	Masaki Tsuji	Masamune Ochiai	Hidenobu Hata	February 9, 1969
59	"Daruma"; Transliteration: "Daruma" (Japanese: だるま)	Kazuya Miyazaki	Shun'ichi Yukimuro	Toshiyasu Okada	Tadami Shimokawa	February 16, 1969
60	"The Hat Guardian"; Transliteration: "Kasa Jizō" (Japanese: 笠地蔵)	Masayuki Akehi	Shun'ichi Yukimuro	Seishi Hayashi	Masahiro Ioka	February 23, 1969
61	"The Abrupt God"; Transliteration: "Ushirogami" (Japanese: 後神)	Hideo Furusawa	Hiroshi Ozawa	Yoshitsugu Nabeshima	Tadami Shimokawa	March 2, 1969
62	"Old Man Sea"; Transliteration: "Umijijii" (Japanese: 海じじい)	Isao Takahata	Shun'ichi Yukimuro	Masamune Ochiai	Hidenobu Hata	March 9, 1969
63	"Namahage"; Transliteration: "Namahage" (Japanese: なまはげ)	Nobutaka Nishizawa	Masaki Tsuji	Toshiyasu Okada	Tadami Shimokawa	March 16, 1969
64	"Reincarnated Demon"; Transliteration: "Onmoraki" (Japanese: 陰摩羅鬼)	Kazuya Miyazaki	Shun'ichi Yukimuro	Fumio Eto	Hidenobu Hata	March 23, 1969
65	"Youkai Apprentice"; Transliteration: "Yōkai Hōkō" (Japanese: 妖怪ほうこう)	Tomoharu Katsumata	Michio Suzuki	Hiroshi Wagatsuma	Hidenobu Hata	March 30, 1969

=== 1971 ===
No.	Title	Directed by	Written by	Animation directed by	Art directed by	Original release date
1	"Return of the Yōkai"	Tokue Shirane	Shun'ichi Yukimuro	Akinori Ōrai	Hidenobu Hata	October 7, 1971
2	"Yōkai Cloth"	Nobutaka Nishizawa	Toyohiro Andō	Hiroshi Wagatsuma	Tadami Shimokawa	October 14, 1971
3	"The Great Yōkai Trial"	Yasuo Yamaguchi	Kaya Miyoshi	Tsuguyuki Kubo	Hidenobu Hata	October 21, 1971
4	"Amefuri-Tengu"	Takeshi Tamiya	Masaki Tsuji	Takeshi Shirato	Tomoo Fukumoto	October 28, 1971
5	"Ashi-Magari"	Isao Takahata	Natsuyo Shibata	Toshio Mori	Tadami Shimokawa	November 4, 1971
6	"Shibito-Tsuki"	Kazukiyo Shigeno	Toyohiro Andō	Makoto Kuniyasu	Tadami Shimokawa	November 11, 1971
7	"Neko-Mata"	Yoshikata Nitta	Shun'ichi Yukimuro	Akira Daikuhara	Tomoo Fukumoto	November 18, 1971
8	"Mammoth Flower"	Tokiji Kaburagi	Masaki Tsuji	Hiroshi Wagatsuma	Hidenobu Hata	November 25, 1971
9	"Kami-sama"	Yasuo Yamaguchi	Natsuyo Shibata	Fumio Eto	Tadami Shimokawa	December 2, 1971
10	"Ghosts of Angkor Wat"	Nobutaka Nishizawa	Shun'ichi Yukimuro	Takeshi Shirato	Tomoo Fukumoto	December 9, 1971
11	"Tsuchi-Korobi"	Tokue Shirane	Toyohiro Andō	Takuo Noda	Hidenobu Hata	December 16, 1971
12	"Yamata-no-Orochi"	Kazukiyo Shigeno	Masaki Tsuji	Akira Daikuhara	Tomoo Fukumoto	December 23, 1971
13	"Kamaboko"	Hiroshi Shidara	Natsuyo Shibata	Jōji Kikuchi	Tadami Shimokawa	December 30, 1971
14	"Suspicious Car"	Hiromi Yamamoto	Kaya Miyoshi	Takeshi Shirato	Tomoo Fukumoto	January 6, 1972
15	"Gyūki"	Nobutaka Nishizawa	Toyohiro Andō	Fumio Eto	Hidenobu Hata	January 13, 1972
16	"Invitation from the South"	Yasuo Yamaguchi	Masaki Tsuji	Akinori Ōrai	Hidenobu Hata	January 20, 1972
17	"Divorce Insects"	Hiroshi Shidara	Shun'ichi Yukimuro	Takeshi Shirato	Tomoo Fukumoto	January 27, 1972
18	"A Monster Named Happiness"	Kazukiyo Shigeno	Toyohiro Andō	Makoto Kuniyasu	Tomoo Fukumoto	February 3, 1972
19	"Kamanari"	Hiromi Yamamoto	Masaki Tsuji	Fumio Eto	Tomoo Fukumoto	February 10, 1972
20	"Fukuro-Sage"	Tokiji Kaburagi	Toyohiro Andō	Toshio Mori	Hidenobu Hata	February 17, 1972
21	"Worry Shop"	Tokue Shirane	Natsuyo Shibata	Jōji Kikuchi	Tomoo Fukumoto	February 24, 1972
22	"Hell's Water"	Yasuo Yamaguchi	Shun'ichi Yukimuro	Takeshi Shirato	Hidenobu Hata	March 2, 1972
23	"Reverse Mochi Murder"	Tokue Shirane	Toyohiro Andō	Takuo Noda	Tomoo Fukumoto	March 9, 1972
24	"Kasa-Bake"	Yoshikatsu Kasai	Masaki Tsuji	Jōji Kikuchi	Tadami Shimokawa	March 23, 1972
25	"The Phantom Train"	Kazukiyo Shigeno	Natsuyo Shibata	Takeshi Shirato	Hidenobu Hata	March 30, 1972
26	"Ōkubi"	Nobutaka Nishizawa	Shun'ichi Yukimuro	Akinori Ōrai	Tomoo Fukumoto	April 6, 1972
27	"Iyami"	Hiromi Yamamoto	Toyohiro Andō	Takeshi Shirato	Saburō Yokoi	April 13, 1972
28	"Akaname"	Hiroshi Shidara	Masaki Tsuji	Kazuo Komatsubara	Hidenobu Hata	April 20, 1972
29	"Daidarabotchi"	Yasuo Yamaguchi	Natsuyo Shibata	Makoto Kuniyasu	Tadami Shimokawa	April 27, 1972
30	"Shinigami"	Tokiji Kaburagi	Shun'ichi Yukimuro	Toshio Mori	Tomoo Fukumoto	May 4, 1972
31	"Akashita"	Yoshio Takami	Toyohiro Andō	Toshio Mori	Tomoo Fukumoto	May 11, 1972
32	"Mokumokuren"	Tokue Shirane	Masaki Tsuji	Hiroshi Wagatsuma & Takeshi Shirato	Isamu Tsuchida	May 25, 1972
33	"Akuma Buer"	Yoshikata Nitta	Natsuyo Shibata	Takuo Noda	Tomoo Fukumoto	June 1, 1972
34	"Shinigami and Satori"	Nobutaka Nishizawa	Shun'ichi Yukimuro	Takeshi Shirato	Isamu Tsuchida	June 15, 1972
35	"Easter Island Epitaph"	Kazukiyo Shigeno	Toyohiro Andō	Kazuo Komatsubara	Hidenobu Hata	June 22, 1972
36	"Yōkai Mansion"	Hiroshi Shidara	Masaki Tsuji	Hiroshi Wagatsuma	Hidenobu Hata	June 29, 1972
37	"Chisōgan"	Yoshikatsu Kasai	Natsuyo Shibata	Akinori Ōrai	Hidenobu Hata	July 13, 1972
38	"Hidden Village of Shinigami"	Yasuo Yamaguchi	Shun'ichi Yukimuro	Kazuo Komatsubara	Tadami Shimokawa	July 20, 1972
39	"Yōkai Waterwheel"	Yoshio Takami	Toyohiro Andō	Toshio Mori	Tomoo Fukumoto	July 27, 1972
40	"Genshi-san"	Tokue Shirane	Masaki Tsuji	Hiroshi Wagatsuma	Tomoo Fukumoto	August 10, 1972
41	"Spirit Surgery"	Yoshikata Nitta	Natsuyo Shibata	Kazuo Komatsubara	Hidenobu Hata	August 17, 1972
42	"Shinigami and Binbōgami"	Nobutaka Nishizawa	Shun'ichi Yukimuro	Makoto Kuniyasu	Isamu Tsuchida	August 24, 1972
43	"Suspicious Footprints"	Kazukiyo Shigeno	Toyohiro Andō	Toshio Mori	Tomoo Fukumoto	September 7, 1972
44	"Amagami Yumuchaac"	Yasuo Oibe	Masaki Tsuji	Hiroshi Wagatsuma	Isamu Tsuchida	September 21, 1972
45	"Shinigami's Quota"	Hajime Nakamura	Shun'ichi Yukimuro	Takuo Noda	Tadami Hata	September 28, 1972

=== 1985 ===
No.	Title	Directed by	Written by	Animation directed by	Art directed by	Original release date
1	"The Mysterious Yokai Castle Appears!!"; Transliteration: "Nazo no Yōkai-jō Shutsugen!!" (Japanese: 謎の妖怪城出現!!)	Osamu Kasai	Hiroyuki Hoshiyama	Shigetaka Kiyoyama	Taizaburo Abe	October 12, 1985
2	"Old Man in the Mirror"; Transliteration: "Kagami Jijii" (Japanese: 鏡じじい)	Hiroki Shibata	Junki Takegami	Naohito Takahashi	Taizaburo Abe	October 19, 1985
3	"The Cat Hermit"; Transliteration: "Neko-Sennin" (Japanese: ネコ仙人)	Takashi Tanazawa	Junki Takegami	Iku Ishiguro	Taizaburo Abe	October 26, 1985
4	"The Yokai Nurarihyon"; Transliteration: "Yōkai Nurarihyon" (Japanese: 妖怪ぬらりひょん)	Tetsuo Imazawa	Yukiyoshi Ohashi	Fukuo Yamamoto	Taizaburo Abe	November 2, 1985
5	"The Diamond Yokai Wheel Monk"; Transliteration: "Daiya Yōkai Wanyūdō" (Japanese: ダイヤ妖怪輪入道)	Osamu Kasai	Satoshi Namiki	Yasuhiro Yamaguchi	Taizaburo Abe	November 9, 1985
6	"Going to Hell! The Ghost Train!!"; Transliteration: "Jigoku-gyo! Yūrei Densha!!" (Japanese: 地獄行!幽霊電車!!)	Masahisa Ishida	Hiroyuki Hoshiyama	Jōji Yanase	Shinji Itō & Kunio Kaneshima	November 16, 1985
7	"The Yokai Iso-Onna and Her Child"; Transliteration: "Kozure Yōkai Iso-Onna" (Japanese: 子連れ妖怪磯女)	Hiroki Shibata	Junki Takegami	Yoshinori Kanemori	Taizaburo Abe	November 23, 1985
8	"Daruma's Yokai Consultation Bureau"; Transliteration: "Daruma Yōkai Sōdanjo" (Japanese: だるま妖怪相談所)	Nobutaka Nishizawa	Hiroyuki Hoshiyama	Satoru Iriyoshi	Hiroshi Washizaki	November 30, 1985
9	"The Immortal Yokai Water Tiger"; Transliteration: "Fujimi no Yōkai Suikō" (Japanese: 不死身の妖怪水虎)	Masahisa Ishida	Satoshi Namiki	Shigetaka Kiyoyama	Tsutomu Fujita	December 7, 1985
10	"Yaksha's Demonic Melody"; Transliteration: "Akuma no Merodii Yasha" (Japanese: 悪魔のメロディー・夜叉)	Osamu Kasai & Takashi Tanazawa	Junki Takegami	Iku Ishiguro	Shinji Itō & Kunio Kaneshima	December 14, 1985
11	"Yokai Fox Hakusanbo"; Transliteration: "Yōkai Kitsune Hakusanbō" (Japanese: 妖怪キツネ白山坊)	Hiroki Shibata	Yukiyoshi Ohashi	Masami Shimoda	Hiroshi Washizaki	December 21, 1985
12	"House Guardian and Hat Guardian"; Transliteration: "Zashiki-warashi to Kasa-Jizō" (Japanese: ざしきわらしと笠地蔵)	Tetsuo Imazawa	Hiroyuki Hoshiyama	Fukuo Yamamoto	Tsutomu Fujita	December 28, 1985
13	"The Folding Monk"; Transliteration: "Oritatami-nyūdō" (Japanese: おりたたみ入道)	Yugo Serikawa	Junki Takegami	Satoru Iriyoshi	Shinji Itō & Kunio Kaneshima	January 4, 1986
14	"The Ageless Yokai Turban Shell Devil!?"; Transliteration: "Furōfushi!? Yōkai Sazae-oni" (Japanese: 不老不死!?妖怪さざえ鬼)	Nobutaka Nishizawa	Junki Takegami	Yoshinori Kanemori	Hiroshi Washizaki	January 11, 1986
15	"The Freezing Yokai Snow Woman"; Transliteration: "Reitō Yōjai - Yukinko" (Japanese: 冷凍妖怪・雪ん子)	Kon Koyama & Masahiko Fukutome	Yukiyoshi Ohashi	Tatsuya Furukawa	Tsutomu Fujita	January 18, 1986
16	"Yokai No-Face"; Transliteration: "Yōkai Nopperabō" (Japanese: 妖怪のっぺらぼう)	Hiroki Shibata	Hiroyuki Hoshiyama	Yasuhiro Yamaguchi	Shinji Itō & Kunio Kaneshima	January 25, 1986
17	"Ancient Yokai Fuzzy Hair"; Transliteration: "Kodai Yōkai - Keukegen" (Japanese: 古代妖怪・毛羽毛現)	Masahisa Ishida	Yukiyoshi Ohashi	Shigetaka Kiyoyama	Hiroshi Washizaki	February 1, 1986
18	"Yokai Tenko's Counterattack from the Earth's Core"; Transliteration: "Yōkai Tenko Chitei Ōkoku no Gyakushū" (Japanese: 妖怪天狐地底王国の逆襲)	Takashi Tanazawa	Hiroyuki Hoshiyama	Kiyoshi Matsumoto	Tsutomu Fujita	February 8, 1986
19	"The Dream Yokai Pillow Switcher"; Transliteration: "Yume Yōkai Makura-Gaeshi" (Japanese: ゆめ妖怪まくらがえし)	Tetsuo Imazawa	Junki Takegami	Fukuo Yamamoto	Yoshiyuki Yamamoto	February 15, 1986
20	"Mermaid Love"; Transliteration: "Hangyōjin no Koi" (Japanese: 半魚人の恋)	Yugo Serikawa	Junki Takegami	Satoru Iriyoshi	Hiroshi Washizaki	February 22, 1986
21	"Top Yokai Amamehagi"; Transliteration: "Koma Yōkai Amamehagi" (Japanese: コマ妖怪あまめはぎ)	Takeshi Shirato & Akio Yamadera	Satoshi Namiki	Akira Shimizu	Tsutomu Fujita	March 1, 1986
22	"Mean-Spirited Yokai Amanojaku"; Transliteration: "Ijiwaru Yōkai Amanojaku" (Japanese: いじわる妖怪天邪鬼)	Hiroki Shibata	Yukiyoshi Ohashi	Tomoyuki Matsumoto	Yoshiyuki Yamamoto	March 8, 1986
23	"Electric Yokai Kaminari"; Transliteration: "Denki Yōkai Kaminari" (Japanese: 電気妖怪かみなり)	Masahisa Ishida	Junki Takegami	Yasuhiro Yamaguchi	Hiroshi Washizaki	March 15, 1986
24	"Children are Disappearing!? Yokai Ubume"; Transliteration: "Kodomo ga Kieru!? Yōkai Ubume" (Japanese: 子供が消える!?妖怪うぶめ)	Nobutaka Nishizawa	Haruya Yamazaki	Shigetaka Kiyoyama	Tsutomu Fujita	March 22, 1986
25	"Yokai Shiver"; Transliteration: "Yōkai Buru-Buru" (Japanese: 妖怪ぶるぶる)	Takashi Tanazawa	Junki Takegami	Yasuyoshi Kaneko	Yoshiyuki Yamamoto	March 29, 1986
26	"The Ghost Nighter"; Transliteration: "Obake Naitā" (Japanese: おばけナイター)	Tetsuo Imazawa	Hiroyuki Hoshiyama	Fukuo Yamamoto	Hiroshi Washizaki	April 5, 1986
27	"Yokai Drooping Sack"; Transliteration: "Yōkai Fukuro-sage" (Japanese: 妖怪ふくろさげ)	Hiroki Shibata	Yukiyoshi Ohashi	Satoru Iriyoshi	Tsutomu Fujita	April 12, 1986
28	"Return the Land!! Yokai Mud Monk"; Transliteration: "Ta wo Kaese!! Yōkai Dorotabō" (Japanese: 田を返せ!!妖怪泥田坊)	Takeshi Shirado & Akio Yamadera	Haruya Yamazaki	Akira Shimizu	Hiroshi Washizaki	April 19, 1986
29	"Yokai Drought God"; Transliteration: "Yōkai Hiderigami" (Japanese: 妖怪ひでり神)	Yugo Serikawa	Junki Takegami	Tomoyuki Matsumoto	Masato Itō	May 3, 1986
30	"Yokai Look Up Monk"; Transliteration: "Yōkai Miage-nyūdō" (Japanese: 妖怪見上げ入道)	Masahisa Ishida	Hiroyuki Hoshiyama	Yasuhiro Yamaguchi	Tsutomu Fujita	May 10, 1986
31	"The Yokai of Obebe Swamp"; Transliteration: "Obebe-numa no Yōkai" (Japanese: オベベ沼の妖怪)	Hiroki Shibata	Yukiyoshi Ohashi	Katsuji Matsumoto	Hiroshi Washizaki	May 17, 1986
32	"Kitaro in Danger! The Great Yokai Trial"; Transliteration: "Kitarō Ayaushi! Yōkai Daisaiban" (Japanese: 鬼太郎危うし!妖怪大裁判)	Masayuki Akehi	Junki Takegami	Shigetaka Kiyoyama	Tsutomu Fujita	May 24, 1986
33	"Yokai Filth Licker's Sad Counterattack"; Transliteration: "Yōkai Akaname Kanashimi no Gyakushū" (Japanese: 妖怪あかなめ哀しみの逆襲)	Akinori Nagaoka & Tetsuo Imazawa	Hiroyuki Hoshiyama	Kahoru Hirata	Hiroshi Washizaki	May 31, 1986
34	"The Cat Ghoul of Highway 0"; Transliteration: "Bake-Neko Kokudō 0-gōsen" (Japanese: ばけ猫国道0号線)	Hiroki Shibata	Hiroyuki Hoshiyama	Satoru Iriyoshi	Tsutomu Fujita	June 14, 1986
35	"Yokai Red Tongue's 1,000 Year Kingdom"; Transliteration: "Yōkai Akashita no Sennen-Ōkoku" (Japanese: 妖怪赤舌の千年王国)	Osamu Kasai	Yukiyoshi Ohashi	Tomoyuki Matsumoto	Hiroshi Washizaki	June 28, 1986
36	"Dimensional Yokai Cauldron Dweller"; Transliteration: "Ijigen Yōkai Kamanari" (Japanese: 異次元妖怪かまなり)	Akio Yamadera	Junki Takegami	Akira Shimizu	Tsutomu Fujita	July 5, 1986
37	"Yokai Creepy Mane"; Transliteration: "Yōkai Odoro-odoro" (Japanese: 妖怪おどろおどろ)	Masahisa Ishida	Hiroyuki Hoshiyama	Katsuji Matsumoto	Toshiaki Marumori	July 12, 1986
38	"A Divine Curse!? Yokai Earth Snatcher"; Transliteration: "Tatari da~!? Yōkai Tsuchi-korobi" (Japanese: タタリだ〜!?妖怪土ころび)	Akinori Ōrai	Yukiyoshi Ohashi	Yoshinobu Inano	Hiroshi Washizaki	July 19, 1986
39	"Granny Datsue of the Sanzu River"; Transliteration: "Sanzu no Kawa no Datsue-babaa" (Japanese: 三途の川のだつえばばあ)	Masayuki Akehi	Junki Takegami	Satoru Iriyoshi	Tsutomu Fujita	August 2, 1986
40	"Mt. Fuji Erupts!? Yokai Giant Head"; Transliteration: "Fujiyama Daifunka!? Yōkai Ōkubi" (Japanese: 富士山大噴火!?妖怪大首)	Tetsuo Imazawa	Yukiyoshi Ohashi	Kahoru Hirata	Hiroshi Washizaki	August 9, 1986
41	"Fierce Battle! The Yokai Seikigahara"; Transliteration: "Gekisen! Yōkai Sekigahara" (Japanese: 激戦!妖怪関ヶ原)	Osamu Kasai	Junki Takegami	Shigetaka Kiyoyama	Tsutomu Fujita	August 23, 1986
42	"Yokai Ox Devil"; Transliteration: "Yōkai Gyūki" (Japanese: 妖怪牛鬼)	Masahisa Ishida	Hiroyuki Hoshiyama	Tomoyuki Matsumoto	Hiroshi Washizaki	August 30, 1986
43	"Plate Boy's Yokai Song Award"; Transliteration: "Sara-Kozō Yōkai Kayō Taishō" (Japanese: さら小僧妖怪歌謡大賞)	Takeshi Shirato	Junki Takegami	Akira Shimizu	Tsutomu Fujita	September 6, 1986
44	"Messenger from Another World, Death God"; Transliteration: "Ano Yo kara no Shisha Shinigami" (Japanese: あの世からの使者死神)	Akinori Ōrai	Yukiyoshi Ohashi	Katsuji Matsumoto	Hiroshi Washizaki	September 13, 1986
45	"Save the Yokai Flower!!"; Transliteration: "Yōkai Hana wo Sukue!!" (Japanese: 妖怪花を救え!!)	Masayuki Akehi	Hiroyuki Hoshiyama	Yoshinobu Inano	Tsutomu Fujita	September 20, 1986
46	"Yokai President Winged Cat"; Transliteration: "Yōkai Daitōryō Kōmori-Neko" (Japanese: 妖怪大統領こうもり猫)	Osamu Kasai	Yukiyoshi Ohashi	Satoru Iriyoshi	Hiroshi Washizaki	September 27, 1986
47	"Yokai Grow Up and the Vampire Tree"; Transliteration: "Yōkai Nobiagari to Kyūketsu-ki" (Japanese: 妖怪のびあがりと吸血木)	Tetsuo Imazawa	Junki Takegami	Kahoru Hirata	Tsutomu Fujita	October 4, 1986
48	"Yokai Iyami"; Transliteration: "Yōkai Iyami" (Japanese: 妖怪いやみ)	Masahisa Ishida	Hiroyuki Hoshiyama	Tomoyuki Matsumoto	Hiroshi Washizaki	October 11, 1986
49	"Reincarnated Devil's Yokai Murder Case"; Transliteration: "Yōkai Satsujin Jiken Onmoraki" (Japanese: 妖怪殺人事件おんもらき)	Masayuki Akehi	Junki Takegami	Yasuhiro Yamaguchi	Tsutomu Fujita	October 18, 1986
50	"Yokai Sea Boss' Rage"; Transliteration: "Yōkai Umizatō no Ikari" (Japanese: 妖怪海座頭の怒り)	Akinori Ōrai	Yukiyoshi Ohashi	Shigetaka Kiyoyama	Hiroshi Washizaki	October 25, 1986
51	"The World Yokai Rally"; Transliteration: "Sekai Yōkai Rarii" (Japanese: 世界妖怪ラリー)	Takeshi Shirato	Hiroyuki Hoshiyama	Akira Shimizu	Tsutomu Fujita	November 1, 1986
52	"Burning Nezumi-Otoko's Geta Battle"; Transliteration: "Moeru Nezumi-Otoko Geta Gassen" (Japanese: 燃えるねずみ男げた合戦)	Osamu Kasai	Junki Takegami	Satoru Iriyoshi	Hiroshi Washizaki	November 8, 1986
53	"Yokai Moryo of Plate Mansion"; Transliteration: "Sarayashiki no Yōkai Mōryō" (Japanese: 皿屋敷の妖怪モウリョウ)	Hiroki Shibata	Yukiyoshi Ohashi	Katsuji Matsumoto	Tsutomu Fujita	November 15, 1986
54	"The Demon Belial"; Transliteration: "Akuma Beriaru" (Japanese: 悪魔ベリアル)	Masahisa Ishida	Junki Takegami	Yoshinobu Inano	Hiroshi Washizaki	November 22, 1986
55	"Secret Orders!! Nezumi-Otoko Gets the Death Penalty"; Transliteration: "Maruhi Shiren!! Nezumi-Otoko wa Shikei da" (Japanese: （秘）指令！！ねずみ男は死刑だ)	Tetsuo Imazawa	Hiroyuki Hoshiyama	Kahoru Hirata	Tsutomu Fujita	November 29, 1986
56	"The Tanuki Army Conquers Japan!!"; Transliteration: "Tanuki Gundan Nihon Seifuku!!" (Japanese: タヌキ軍団日本征服!!)	Yugo Serikawa	Hiroyuki Hoshiyama	Tomoyuki Matsumoto	Hiroshi Washizaki	December 6, 1986
57	"The Tanuki Army Conquers Japan!!"; Transliteration: "Tanuki Gundan Nihon Seifuku!!" (Japanese: タヌキ軍団日本征服!!)	Yugo Serikawa	Hiroyuki Hoshiyama	Yasuhiro Yamaguchi	Hiroshi Washizaki	December 13, 1986
58	"Many Eyes of Yokai Castle"; Transliteration: "Yōkai-jō no Mokumokuren" (Japanese: 妖怪城の目目連)	Akinori Ōrai	Yukiyoshi Ohashi	Shigetaka Kiyoyama	Tsutomu Fujita	December 20, 1986
59	"The Evening Primrose Abrupt God"; Transliteration: "Yoimachigusa no Ushirogami" (Japanese: 宵待ち草の後神)	Takeshi Shirado	Yukiyoshi Ohashi	Akira Shimizu	Hiroshi Washizaki	December 27, 1986
60	"Giant Yokai Daidarabotchi"; Transliteration: "Kyōdai Yōkai Daidarabotchi" (Japanese: 巨人妖怪ダイダラボッチ)	Masahisa Ishida	Hiroyuki Hoshiyama	Katsuji Matsumoto	Tsutomu Fujita	January 3, 1987
61	"The Phantom Train"; Transliteration: "Maboroshi no Kisha" (Japanese: まぼろしの汽車)	Osamu Kasai	Yukiyoshi Ohashi	Tomoyuki Matsumoto	Hiroshi Washizaki	January 10, 1987
62	"Yokai Fiery Chariot Gyaku-Mochi Goroshi"; Transliteration: "Yōkai Kasha Gyaku-Mochi Goroshi!!" (Japanese: 妖怪火車逆モチ殺し!!)	Masayuki Akehi	Junki Takegami	Tomoyuki Matsumoto	Tsutomu Fujita	January 17, 1987
63	"The Demon Buer and Hanging Kettle"; Transliteration: "Akuma Bueru to Yakanzuru" (Japanese: 悪魔ブエルとヤカンズル)	Tetsuo Imazawa	Hiroyuki Hoshiyama	Kahoru Hirata	Hiroshi Washizaki	January 24, 1987
64	"Yokai Cave Monk"; Transliteration: "Yōkai Anagura-nyūdō" (Japanese: 妖怪穴ぐら入道)	Yugo Serikawa	Yukiyoshi Ohashi	Jōji Yanase	Tsutomu Fujita	January 31, 1987
65	"Yokai Hundred Eyes Goes to Hell"; Transliteration: "Yōkai Hyakume - Jigoku Nagashi" (Japanese: 妖怪百目・地獄流し)	Akinori Ōrai	Junki Takegami	Yasuhiro Yamaguchi	Hiroshi Washizaki	February 7, 1987
66	"Korean Yokai No Face"; Transliteration: "Kankoku Yōkai Nupperabō" (Japanese: 韓国妖怪ぬっぺらぼう)	Akio Yamadera	Yukiyoshi Ohashi	Akira Shimizu	Tsutomu Fujita	February 14, 1987
67	"The Great Jungle Sea Monster"; Transliteration: "Mitsurin no Dai Kaijū" (Japanese: 密林の大海獣)	Osamu Kasai	Hiroyuki Hoshiyama	Yoshinobu Inano	Hiroshi Washizaki	February 21, 1987
68	"The Great Sea Monster's Angry Counterattack"; Transliteration: "Dai Kaijū Ikari no Gyakushū" (Japanese: 大海獣怒りの逆襲)	Osamu Kasai	Hiroyuki Hoshiyama	Satoru Iriyoshi	Hiroshi Washizaki	February 28, 1987
69	"Yokai Matasaburo of the Wind"; Transliteration: "Yōkai Kaze no Matasaburō" (Japanese: 妖怪風の又三郎)	Masayuki Akehi	Junki Takegami	Shigetaka Kiyoyama	Fumihiro Uchikawa	March 7, 1987
70	"Mirror Hell! Yokai Ungaikyo"; Transliteration: "Kagami Jigoku! Yōkai Ungaikyō" (Japanese: 鏡地獄!妖怪うんがい鏡)	Yugo Serikawa	Junki Takegami	Katsuji Matsumoto	Tsutomu Fujita	March 14, 1987
71	"Gashadokuro of Yokai Flower Forest"; Transliteration: "Yōka no Mori no Gashadokuro" (Japanese: 妖花の森のがしゃどくろ)	Minoru Okazaki	Yukiyoshi Ohashi	Kahoru Hirata	Hiroshi Washizaki	March 21, 1987
72	"Heh-heh-Hair! The Great Yokai Hair-sama"; Transliteration: "Ke - Ke -Ke! Yōkai Dai Kami-sama" (Japanese: ケ・け・毛!妖怪大髪様)	Masahisa Ishida	Hiroyuki Hoshiyama	Tomoyuki Matsumoto	Tsutomu Fujita	March 28, 1987
73	"Shisa Appears!! The Great Battle in Okinawa"; Transliteration: "Shiisā Tōjō!! Okinawa Dai Kessen" (Japanese: シーサー登場!!沖縄大決戦)	Akinori Ōrai	Junki Takegami	Yasuhiro Yamaguchi	Hiroshi Washizaki	April 4, 1987
74	"Yokai 10,000 Year Old Bamboo"; Transliteration: "Yōkai Mannendake" (Japanese: 妖怪万年竹)	Takeshi Shirato	Hiroyuki Hoshiyama	Akira Shimizu	Tsutomu Fujita	April 11, 1987
75	"Yokai Adzuki Allied Forces"; Transliteration: "Yōkai Azuki Rengōgun" (Japanese: 妖怪小豆連合軍)	Hiroki Shibata	Yukiyoshi Ohashi	Yoshinobu Inano	Hiroshi Washizaki	April 18, 1987
76	"The Man Eating Island and the Sea Priest"; Transliteration: "Hitokui-jima to Umioshō" (Japanese: 人喰い島と海和尚)	Yugo Serikawa	Junki Takegami	Jōji Yanase	Kunio Kaneshima	April 25, 1987
77	"Yokai Eyes on Hand and the Hell Child"; Transliteration: "Yōkai Tenome to Jigoku no Gaki" (Japanese: 妖怪手の目と地獄の餓鬼)	Masayuki Akehi	Hiroyuki Hoshiyama	Shigetaka Kiyoyama	Hiroshi Washizaki	May 2, 1987
78	"Mammoth Flower and Mountain Man"; Transliteration: "Manmosu Furawā to Yama-otoko" (Japanese: マンモスフラワーと山男)	Osamu Kasai	Junki Takegami	Shigetaka Kiyoyama	Hidenobu Hata	May 16, 1987
79	"Yokai Eight Headed Snake"; Transliteration: "Yōkai Yamata-no-orochi" (Japanese: 妖怪やまたのおろち)	Masahisa Ishida	Yukiyoshi Ohashi	Tomoyuki Matsumoto	Tsutomu Fujita	May 23, 1987
80	"Yokai Granny Fire Snuff's Pro Wrestling Hell"; Transliteration: "Yōkai Fukikeshi-baba Puroresu Jigoku" (Japanese: 妖怪吹消婆プロレス地獄)	Akinori Ōrai	Junki Takegami	Satoru Iriyoshi	Hiroshi Washizaki	May 30, 1987
81	"Yokai Combo Long Arm Long Leg"; Transliteration: "Konbi Yōkai Tenaga-Ashinaga" (Japanese: コンビ妖怪手長足長)	Minoru Okazaki	Hiroyuki Hoshiyama	Kahoru Hirata	Kunio Kaneshima	June 6, 1987
82	"Yokai Skewer Monk"; Transliteration: "Yōkai Kushizashi-nyūdō" (Japanese: 妖怪串刺し入道)	Yugo Serikawa	Yukiyoshi Ohashi	Yoshinobu Inano	Hiroshi Washizaki	June 13, 1987
83	"The Legend of the Rain God Yumuchaac"; Transliteration: "Ujin Yumuchakku Densetsu" (Japanese: 雨神ユムチャック伝説)	Hiroki Shibata	Junki Takegami	Katsuji Matsumoto	Tsutomu Fujita	June 20, 1987
84	"All Around Hell! The Yokai Marathon"; Transliteration: "Jigoku Isshū!! Yōkai Marason" (Japanese: 地獄一周!!妖怪マラソン)	Takeshi Shirato	Hiroyuki Hoshiyama	Akira Shimizu	Hiroshi Washizaki	June 27, 1987
85	"The Kappa Family and Takuro-bi"; Transliteration: "Kappa Ichizoku to Takurō-bi" (Japanese: 河童一族とたくろう火)	Masahisa Ishida	Yukiyoshi Ohashi	Tomoyuki Matsumoto	Tsutomu Fujita	July 4, 1987
86	"Yokai Censer's Dream Demon Army"; Transliteration: "Yōkai Kōro Akumu no Gundam" (Japanese: 妖怪香炉悪夢の軍団)	Osamu Kasai	Junki Takegami	Shigetaka Kiyoyama	Hiroshi Washizaki	July 11, 1987
87	"Parasitic Yokai Penanggalan"; Transliteration: "Kisei Yōkai Penangaran" (Japanese: 寄生妖怪ペナンガラン)	Akinori Ōrai	Hiroyuki Hoshiyama	Jōji Yanase	Tsutomu Fujita	July 25, 1987
88	"The Mysterious Yokai Dog Taro"; Transliteration: "Fushigi na Yōken Tarō" (Japanese: 不思議な妖犬タロー)	Yugo Serikawa	Yukiyoshi Ohashi	Tomoyuki Matsumoto	Hiroshi Washizaki	August 1, 1987
89	"Tree Child and Yokai Mountain Tengu"; Transliteration: "Kinoko to Yōkai Yama-tengū" (Japanese: 木の子と妖怪山天狗)	Minoru Okazaki	Junki Takegami	Kahoru Hirata	Sukeyuki Tanaka	August 15, 1987
90	"The Blue Tears of the Fairy Nix"; Transliteration: "Yōsei Nikusu no Aoi Namida" (Japanese: 妖精ニクスの青い涙)	Hiroki Shibata	Hiroyuki Hoshiyama & Ken'ichi Kanemaki	Yoshinobu Inano	Hiroshi Washizaki	August 22, 1987
91	"Yokai Hunter Family Hi"; Transliteration: "Yōkai Hantā Hi Ichizoku" (Japanese: 妖怪ハンターヒ一族)	Osamu Kasai	Junki Takegami	Satoru Iriyoshi	Masato Itō	August 29, 1987
92	"The Rattling of Cannibal House and Yokai House"; Transliteration: "Hitokui-ka to Yōkai-ka Nari" (Japanese: 人喰い家と妖怪家鳴)	Yugo Serikawa	Yukiyoshi Ohashi	Tomoyuki Matsumoto	Hiroshi Washizaki	September 26, 1987
93	"Evolved Yokai Otter"; Transliteration: "Shinka Yōkai Kabuso" (Japanese: 進化妖怪かぶそ)	Hiroki Shibata	Junki Takegami	Yasuhiro Yamaguchi	Tsutomu Fujita	October 3, 1987
94	"Red Hot Yokai Removable Neck"; Transliteration: "Kōnetsu Yōkai Nuke-kubi" (Japanese: 高熱妖怪ぬけ首)	Takeshi Shirato	Hiroyuki Hoshiyama	Akira Shimizu	Motoyuki Tanaka	October 10, 1987
95	"The Laughing Yokai Henra-hera-hera"; Transliteration: "Warai Yōkai Henra-hera-hera" (Japanese: 笑い妖怪ヘンラヘラヘラ)	Tetsuo Imazawa	Yukiyoshi Ohashi	Kahoru Hirata	Hiroshi Washizaki	October 17, 1987
96	"Blood Battle!! Yokai Vampire Army"; Transliteration: "Kessen!! Yōkai Kyūketsu Gundan" (Japanese: 血戦!!妖怪吸血軍団)	Yugo Serikawa	Junki Takegami	Yoshinobu Inano	Motoyuki Tanaka	October 24, 1987
97	"Married Yokai!? Plate Counter"; Transliteration: "Fūfu Yōkai!? Sarakazoe" (Japanese: 夫婦妖怪!?皿数え)	Masahisa Ishida	Hiroyuki Hoshiyama	Tomoyuki Matsumoto	Hiroshi Washizaki	October 31, 1987
98	"Tsunami Yokai Fierce Ghost Hassan"; Transliteration: "Tsunami Yōkai Mōrei-Hassan" (Japanese: 津波妖怪猛霊はっさん)	Akio Yamadera	Yukiyoshi Ohashi	Kōichi Takata	Kenji Matsumoto	November 7, 1987
99	"Footwear Yokai Ghoul Zōri"; Transliteration: "Hakimono Yōkai Bakezōri" (Japanese: はきもの妖怪化けぞうり)	Masahisa Ishida	Hiroyuki Hoshiyama	Tomoyuki Matsumoto	Hiroshi Washizaki	November 14, 1987
100	"Devil Miko's Kitaro Destruction Plan"; Transliteration: "Oni Miko no Kitarō Massatsu Sakusen" (Japanese: 鬼巫女の鬼太郎抹殺作戦)	Tetsuo Imazawa	Junki Takegami	Kahoru Hirata	Kunio Kaneshima	November 21, 1987
101	"Yokai Detective Story, The Cat Riot"; Transliteration: "Yōkai Torimonochō Neko Sōdō" (Japanese: 妖怪捕物帖猫騒動)	Masayuki Akehi	Hiroyuki Hoshiyama	Yasuhiro Yamaguchi	Motoyuki Tanaka	December 12, 1987
102	"Tomboy Witch Jiniya"; Transliteration: "Otenba Majō Jiniyā" (Japanese: おてんば魔女ジニヤー)	Osamu Kasai	Yukiyoshi Ohashi	Tomoyuki Matsumoto	Yūji Ikeda	December 19, 1987
103	"True Love: Nurikabe and Face Powder Girl"; Transliteration: "Junai Nurikabe to Oshiroi-musume" (Japanese: 純愛ぬりかべとおしろい娘)	Osamu Kasai	Junki Takegami	Hiromi Niioka	Tsutomu Fujita	December 26, 1987
104	"The Mysterious Yokai Hunter Tour"; Transliteration: "Nazo no Yōkai Gari Tsuā" (Japanese: 謎の妖怪狩りツアー)	Yugo Serikawa	Hiroyuki Hoshiyama	Tomoyuki Matsumoto	Yûko Kobayashi	January 9, 1988
105	"Yokai Menko Tengu"; Transliteration: "Yōkai Menko Tengū" (Japanese: 妖怪めんこ天狗)	Takeshi Shirato	Hiroyuki Hoshiyama	Kōichi Takata	Tomoko Yoshida	January 16, 1988
106	"Tofu Kid and Mountain God"; Transliteration: "Tōfu-kozō to Yamagami" (Japanese: とうふ小僧と山神)	Hiroki Shibata	Yukiyoshi Ohashi	Tomoyuki Matsumoto	Yûko Kobayashi	January 23, 1988
107	"Smoke Yokai Enra-enra"; Transliteration: "Kemuri Yōkai Enra-enra" (Japanese: ケムリ妖怪えんらえんら)	Minoru Okazaki	Junki Takegami	Yasunori Miyazawa	Tomoko Yoshida	January 30, 1988
108	"Kitaro Family Forever"; Transliteration: "Kitarō Famirii wa Towa ni" (Japanese: 鬼太郎ファミリーは永遠に)	Osamu Kasai	Hiroyuki Hoshiyama	Hiromi Niioka	Yûko Kobayashi	February 6, 1988
Jigoku-hen
109	"Journey to Hell in Search of Mother"; Transliteration: "Haha wo Motomete Jigoku-tabi" (Japanese: 母を求めて地獄旅)	Hiroki Shibata	Junki Takegami	Tomoyuki Matsumoto	Tomoko Yoshida	February 8, 1988
110	"Bloody Battle on the Sanzu River"; Transliteration: "Kessen Sanzu no Kawa" (Japanese: 血戦三途の川)	Osamu Kasai	Junki Takegami	Satoru Iriyoshi	Kunio Kaneshima & Takeshi Waki	February 15, 1988
111	"Kitaro vs the Prince of Hell"; Transliteration: "Kitarō VS Jigoku-Dōji" (Japanese: 鬼太郎VS地獄童子)	Minoru Okazaki	Junki Takegami	Yasunori Miyazawa	Tsutomu Fujita	February 22, 1988
112	"Trap of the Two Great Yokai"; Transliteration: "Nidai Yōkai no Wana" (Japanese: 二大妖怪の罠)	Takeshi Shirato	Yukiyoshi Ohashi	Kōichi Takata	Kunio Kaneshima	February 29, 1988
113	"Execution Strategy of the Hell Warriors!!"; Transliteration: "Jigoku Musha no Shokei Sakusen!!" (Japanese: 地獄武者の 処刑作戦!!)	Yugo Serikawa	Junki Takegami	Tomoyuki Matsumoto	Toshiaki Marumori	March 7, 1988
114	"Nururibo, the Blood Lake Yokai"; Transliteration: "Chinoike Yōkai Nururibō" (Japanese: 血の池妖怪 ヌルリ坊)	Hiroki Shibata	Junki Takegami	Takashi Saijō	Motoyuki Tanaka	March 14, 1988
115	"Kitaro's Final Encounter!!"; Transliteration: "Kitarō Saigō no Deai!!" (Japanese: 鬼太郎 最後の出会い!!)	Osamu Kasai	Junki Takegami	Satoru Iriyoshi & Hiromi Niioka	Kunio Kaneshima	March 21, 1988

=== 1996 ===
No.	Title	Directed by	Written by	Animation directed by	Art directed by	Original release date
1	"Yōkai! Miage-Nyūdō"	Daisuke Nishio	Junki Takegami	Hiroya Iijima	Mataji Urata	January 7, 1996
2	"Yōkai Mokumokuren's Tears!"	Masayuki Akehi	Hiroshi Hashimoto	Akio Endō	Yoshiyuki Shikano	January 14, 1996
3	"Guitar of Horror! Yasha"	Yukio Kaizawa	Shun'ichi Yukimuro	Kazue Kinoshita	Iwamitsu Itō	January 21, 1996
4	"Fear! Mirror Country of Kagami-Jijii"	Takenori Kawada	Junki Takegami	Yukio Ebisawa	Yoshiyuki Shikano	January 28, 1996
5	"Diamond Yokai: Wanyūdō"	Takao Yoshizawa	Hiroshi Hashimoto	Yoshitaka Yashima	Masazumi Matsumiya	February 4, 1996
6	"Berserk! Kitarō-Gyūki"	Masayuki Akehi	Junki Takegami	Toshio Deguchi	Yoshiyuki Shikano	February 11, 1996
7	"Yōkai Nopperabō"	Directed by : Kōnosuke Uda; Storyboarded by : Yukio Kaizawa	Hiroshi Hashimoto	Masahiro Naoi	Masazumi Matsumiya	February 18, 1996
8	"Yōkai Kani-Bōzu and Kappa"	Takenori Kawada	Junki Takegami	Kazue Kinoshita	Yoshiyuki Shikano	February 25, 1996
9	"Roar! Kitarō Train"	Takao Yoshizawa	Shun'ichi Yukimuro	Hiroya Iijima	Masazumi Matsumiya	March 3, 1996
10	"Bizarre! Yōkai Mannen-Dake"	Daisuke Nishio	Michiru Shimada	Akio Endō	Yoshiyuki Shikano	March 10, 1996
11	"Keukegen and Gasha-Dokuro"	Kōnosuke Uda	Junki Takegami	Yukio Ebisawa	Masazumi Matsumiya	March 17, 1996
12	"Conspiracy! Neko-Sennin's Cat Kingdom"	Masayuki Akehi	Hiroshi Hashimoto	Yoshitaka Yashima	Yoshiyuki Shikano	March 24, 1996
13	"Welcome to the Yōkai Mansion"	Takenori Kawada	Michiru Shimada	Toshio Deguchi	Masazumi Matsumiya	March 31, 1996
14	"Mirage Water Dragon: Mizuchi"	Takao Yoshizawa	Junki Takegami	Masahiro Naoi	Keito Watanabe	April 7, 1996
15	"Nightmare! Yōkai Makura-Gaeshi"	Masayuki Akehi	Yukiyoshi Ohashi	Kazue Kinoshita	Masazumi Matsumiya	April 14, 1996
16	"Akaname and Shiro-Uneri"	Kōnosuke Uda	Junki Takegami	Hiroya Iijima	Yoshiyuki Shikano	April 21, 1996
17	"Strange Sea! Yōkai Sazae-Oni"	Daisuke Nishio	Yukiyoshi Ohashi	Yukio Ebisawa	Masazumi Matsumiya	April 28, 1996
18	"Deep Sea Miracle! Bake-Kujira"	Takenori Kawada	Yukiyoshi Ohashi	Akio Endō	Keito Watanabe	May 5, 1996
19	"Terror! Yōkai Kubire-Oni"	Takao Yoshizawa	Junki Takegami	Yoshitaka Yashima	Masazumi Matsumiya	May 12, 1996
20	"Adventure! Man-Eating Island of the Distant Sea"	Masayuki Akehi	Hiroshi Hashimoto	Toshio Deguchi	Kazuhisa Asai	May 19, 1996
21	"Oshiroi-Babaa and Nopperabō"	Kōnosuke Uda	Yukiyoshi Ohashi	Masahiro Naoi	Masazumi Matsumiya	May 26, 1996
22	"Uprising! Yōkai Dorotabō"	Takenori Kawada	Junki Takegami	Kazue Kinoshita	Keito Watanabe	June 2, 1996
23	"Wind Devil! Yōkai Amefuri-Tengu"	Takao Yoshizawa	Yukiyoshi Ohashi	Hiroya Iijima	Masazumi Matsumiya	June 9, 1996
24	"Ghost Story! Yōkai Onmoraki"	Junichi Sato	Junki Takegami	Yukio Ebisawa	Kazuyuki Hashimoto	June 16, 1996
25	"Yōkai of the Ancient City – Oboro-Guruma"	Kōnosuke Uda	Yukiyoshi Ohashi	Yoshitaka Yashima	Masazumi Matsumiya	June 23, 1996
26	"Resurrection! Yōkai Ama-no-Jaku"	Daisuke Nishio	Shun'ichi Yukimuro	Hitoshi Inaba	Keito Watanabe	June 30, 1996
27	"Sucking Devil! Yōkai Nozuchi"	Masayuki Akehi	Junki Takegami	Masahiro Naoi	Masazumi Matsumiya	July 7, 1996
28	"Illusion Story: A Ticket for Cat Street"	Takao Yoshizawa	Yukiyoshi Ohashi	Toshio Deguchi	Yoshiyuki Shikano	July 21, 1996
29	"Giant Legend Daidarabotchi"	Takenori Kawada	Hiroshi Hashimoto	Kazue Kinoshita	Masazumi Matsumiya	July 28, 1996
30	"Yōka! Memory of a Summer Day"	Masayuki Akehi	Michiru Shimada	Yukio Ebisawa	Keito Watanabe	August 4, 1996
31	"Yōkai Transformation! Kasa-Bake"	Kōnosuke Uda	Junki Takegami	Yoshitaka Yashima	Masazumi Matsumiya	August 11, 1996
32	"Electric Yōkai Kaminari!"	Takao Yoshizawa	Yukiyoshi Ohashi	Masahiro Naoi	Kazuyuki Hashimoto	August 18, 1996
33	"Counterattack! Yōkai Sara-Kozō"	Junichi Sato	Junki Takegami	Hiroya Iijima	Masazumi Matsumiya	August 25, 1996
34	"Wanderer! Yōkai Azuki-Togi"	Masayuki Akehi	Yukiyoshi Ohashi	Hitoshi Inaba	Keito Watanabe	September 1, 1996
35	"Kitarō's Cruise to Hell"	Kōnosuke Uda	Michiru Shimada	Toshio Deguchi	Masazumi Matsumiya	September 8, 1996
36	"Astounded! Oritatami-Nyūdō"	Takenori Kawada	Yukiyoshi Ohashi	Kazue Kinoshita	Kazuyuki Hashimoto	September 15, 1996
37	"Great Chase! The Yōkai Car"	Takao Yoshizawa	Junki Takegami	Yukio Ebisawa	Masazumi Matsumiya	September 22, 1996
38	"Blood Fight! Odoro-Odoro"	Masayuki Akehi	Hiroshi Hashimoto	Yoshitaka Yashima	Keito Watanabe	September 29, 1996
39	"Yōko: Hakusanbō's Bride"	Junichi Sato	Michiru Shimada	Masahiro Naoi	Masazumi Matsumiya	October 6, 1996
40	"Graveyard Night is for the Sports Festival!"	Kōnosuke Uda	Yukiyoshi Ohashi	Hiroya Iijima	Kazuyuki Hashimoto	October 13, 1996
41	"Pickler Yōkai Hōkō!"	Takao Yoshizawa	Junki Takegami	Toshio Deguchi	Masazumi Matsumiya	October 20, 1996
42	"Gangi-Kozō and Nezumi-Otoko"	Masayuki Akehi	Yukiyoshi Ohashi	Hitoshi Inaba	Keito Watanabe	October 27, 1996
43	"Rebellion! Yōkai Bake-Zōri"	Takenori Kawada	Junki Takegami	Yukio Ebisawa	Masazumi Matsumiya	November 3, 1996
44	"Western Akuma Belial!"	Kōnosuke Uda	Yukiyoshi Ohashi	Kazue Kinoshita	Kazuhisa Asai	November 10, 1996
45	"Mochi Murder! Yōkai Kasha"	Junichi Sato	Daisuke Yajima	Yoshitaka Yashima	Masazumi Matsumiya	November 17, 1996
46	"The Great Yōkai Trial"	Masayuki Akehi	Junki Takegami	Masahiro Naoi	Keito Watanabe	November 24, 1996
47	"The Great Yōkai Trial"	Takao Yoshizawa	Junki Takegami	Kazue Kinoshita	Masazumi Matsumiya	December 1, 1996
48	"Enma-Daiō and Neko-Musume"	Kōnosuke Uda	Chikako Kobayashi	Toshio Deguchi	Kazuyuki Hashimoto	December 8, 1996
49	"Water Yōkai Akashita's Sprint!"	Takenori Kawada	Daisuke Yajima	Yukio Ebisawa	Masazumi Matsumiya	December 15, 1996
50	"Fukikeshi-Babaa of the Amusement Park!"	Takao Yoshizawa	Yukiyoshi Ohashi	Hitoshi Inaba	Keito Watanabe	December 22, 1996
51	"The Snow Falls! Kasa-Jizō"	Junichi Sato	Junki Takegami	Kazue Kinoshita	Masazumi Matsumiya	December 29, 1996
52	"Top Yōkai Amamehagi!"	Masayuki Akehi	Daisuke Yajima	Yoshitaka Yashima	Ken Tokushige	January 12, 1997
53	"Cemetery Journey: Ghost Train!"	Kōnosuke Uda	Yukiyoshi Ohashi	Masahiro Naoi	Masazumi Matsumiya	January 19, 1997
54	"Yōkai Jami and Gama-Sennin!"	Takao Yoshizawa	Yukiyoshi Ohashi	Hiroya Iijima	Keito Watanabe	January 26, 1997
55	"Zashiki-Warashi and Yōkai Ushirogami"	Takenori Kawada	Junki Takegami	Toshio Deguchi	Masazumi Matsumiya	February 2, 1997
56	"Water Transformation! Yōkai Suiko"	Masayuki Akehi	Daisuke Yajima	Yukio Ebisawa	Fumihiro Uchikawa	February 9, 1997
57	"Vampire Elite"	Takao Yoshizawa	Hiroshi Hashimoto	Kazue Kinoshita	Masazumi Matsumiya	February 16, 1997
58	"Freezing Yōkai: Yukinko!"	Tomoharu Katsumata	Shun'ichi Yukimuro	Hitoshi Inaba	Keito Watanabe	February 23, 1997
59	"Yōkai Obariyon!"	Kōnosuke Uda	Yukiyoshi Ohashi	Yoshitaka Yashima	Masazumi Matsumiya	March 2, 1997
60	"Nurarihyon's Conspiracy"	Takenori Kawada	Daisuke Yajima	Masahiro Naoi	Keito Watanabe	March 9, 1997
61	"Beware of the Yōkai Iyami"	Takao Yoshizawa	Ryō Tamura	Hiroya Iijima	Masazumi Matsumiya	March 16, 1997
62	"Bizarre! Bake-Neko Road"	Masayuki Akehi	Shun'ichi Yukimuro	Yukio Ebisawa	Keito Watanabe	March 23, 1997
63	"Welcome!! Yōkai Hotel"	Tomoharu Katsumata	Junki Takegami	Toshio Deguchi	Masazumi Matsumiya	March 30, 1997
64	"Violent Dispute! Yōkai Rally"	Kōnosuke Uda	Hiroshi Hashimoto	Kazue Kinoshita	Fumihiro Uchikawa	April 6, 1997
65	"Threat! Mammoth Flower"	Takao Yoshizawa	Daisuke Yajima	Hitoshi Inaba	Masazumi Matsumiya	April 13, 1997
66	"Ominous Sky! Yōkai Castle"	Takenori Kawada	Hiroshi Hashimoto	Yoshitaka Yashima	Masazumi Matsumiya	April 20, 1997
67	"Ominous Sky! Yōkai Castle"	Masayuki Akehi	Hiroshi Hashimoto	Masahiro Naoi	Masazumi Matsumiya	April 27, 1997
68	"The Legend of the Rough Sea: Iso-Onna!"	Munehisa Sakai	Yukiyoshi Ohashi	Hiroya Iijima	Kenji Matsumoto	May 4, 1997
69	"Akuma Buer and Yakanzuru"	Kōnosuke Uda	Ryō Tamura	Yukio Ebisawa	Masazumi Matsumiya	May 11, 1997
70	"Mysterious Weather! Yōkai Guwagoze"	Takao Yoshizawa	Daisuke Yajima	Toshio Deguchi	Masazumi Matsumiya	May 18, 1997
71	"Yōkai of Obebe Swamp!"	Takenori Kawada	Junki Takegami	Kazue Kinoshita	Ken Tokushige	May 25, 1997
72	"Appearance! Tenko's Underground Kingdom"	Masayuki Akehi	Daisuke Yajima	Yoshitaka Yashima	Kenji Matsumoto	June 1, 1997
73	"Blast! The Angry Tsuchi-Korobi"	Tomoharu Katsumata	Ryō Tamura	Masahiro Naoi	Masazumi Matsumiya	June 8, 1997
74	"Great Serpent God Yamata-no-Orochi!"	Takao Yoshizawa	Daisuke Yajima	Hiroya Iijima	Masazumi Matsumiya	June 15, 1997
75	"Witchcraft: Mirror Battle!"	Takenori Kawada	Shun'ichi Yukimuro	Yukio Ebisawa	Hiromitsu Shiozaki	June 22, 1997
76	"The Scorching Yōkai! Hiderigami"	Munehisa Sakai	Toshinobu Ooi	Toshio Deguchi	Masazumi Matsumiya	June 29, 1997
77	"Umi-Oshō and Funa-Yūrei!"	Masayuki Akehi	Junki Takegami	Kazue Kinoshita	Masazumi Matsumiya	July 6, 1997
78	"Nurarihyon and Jakotsu-Babaa"	Junichi Sato	Ryō Tamura	Yoshitaka Yashima	Masazumi Matsumiya	July 13, 1997
79	"Chinese Yōkai Invasion!"	Takenori Kawada	Daisuke Yajima	Masahiro Naoi	Tsutomu Fujita	July 20, 1997
80	"Chinese Yōkai Invasion!"	Tomoharu Katsumata	Daisuke Yajima	Hiroya Iijima	Masazumi Matsumiya	August 3, 1997
81	"Child Rearing Yōkai! Ubume"	Masayuki Akehi	Chikako Kobayashi	Yukio Ebisawa	Masazumi Matsumiya	August 10, 1997
82	"Ancient Yōkai: Ōkubi!"	Munehisa Sakai	Junki Takegami	Toshio Deguchi	Masazumi Matsumiya	August 17, 1997
83	"Geta Battle! Yōkai Sakabashira"	Takenori Kawada	Daisuke Yajima	Kazue Kinoshita	Ken Tokushige	August 24, 1997
84	"Bizarre! Man-Eating Portrait"	Junichi Sato	Story by : Junichi Sato; Teleplay by : Yukiyoshi Ohashi	Yoshitaka Yashima	Masazumi Matsumiya	August 31, 1997
85	"Demon Cave: Tsuchigumo's Mountain!"	Masayuki Akehi	Ryō Tamura	Masahiro Naoi	Masazumi Matsumiya	September 7, 1997
86	"Corpse User: Mōryō"	Takao Yoshizawa	Toshinobu Ooi	Hiroya Iijima	Kenji Matsumoto	September 14, 1997
87	"Kura-Bokko's Lost Home"	Hiroki Shibata	Yukiyoshi Ohashi	Yukio Ebisawa	Masazumi Matsumiya	September 21, 1997
88	"Yōkai Fukuro-Sage's Trap!"	Takenori Kawada	Junki Takegami	Toshio Deguchi	Masazumi Matsumiya	September 28, 1997
89	"Hair Hell! Rakshasa"	Hiroyuki Kakudō	Chiaki J. Konaka	Kazue Kinoshita	Ken Tokushige	October 5, 1997
90	"Yōkai of the Mountain Pass: Buru-Buru"	Masayuki Akehi	Ryō Tamura	Yoshitaka Yashima	Masazumi Matsumiya	October 12, 1997
91	"Haunts of the Night! Hyakki-Yagyō's Oni"	Munehisa Sakai	Yukiyoshi Ohashi	Masahiro Naoi	Masazumi Matsumiya	October 19, 1997
92	"Hyakume and Nurarihyon"	Takao Yoshizawa	Toshinobu Ooi	Hiroya Iijima	Kenji Matsumoto	October 26, 1997
93	"Yōkai from the Moon: Katsura-Otoko!"	Takenori Kawada	Daisuke Yajima	Yukio Ebisawa	Masazumi Matsumiya	November 2, 1997
94	"Kitarō-Fish and the Moat"	Mamoru Hosoda	Junki Takegami	Toshio Deguchi	Masazumi Matsumiya	November 9, 1997
95	"Yōkai Energy Thief: Kamanari!"	Hiroki Shibata	Yukiyoshi Ohashi	Kazue Kinoshita	Ken Tokushige	November 16, 1997
96	"Yōkai King: Nurarihyon"	Masayuki Akehi	Daisuke Yajima	Yoshitaka Yashima	Masazumi Matsumiya	November 23, 1997
97	"Chase! The Four Western Yōkai Kings"	Takao Yoshizawa	Daisuke Yajima	Masahiro Naoi	Masazumi Matsumiya	November 30, 1997
98	"Ordeal: The Road to Demon Castle!"	Takenori Kawada	Hiroshi Hashimoto	Hiroya Iijima	Kenji Matsumoto	December 7, 1997
99	"Decisive Battle! Yōkai King vs. Kitarō"	Munehisa Sakai	Hiroshi Hashimoto	Yukio Ebisawa	Masazumi Matsumiya	December 14, 1997
100	"Invitation in the Dark: Yōkai Kage-Onna"	Hiroki Shibata	Ryō Tamura	Toshio Deguchi	Ken Tokushige	December 21, 1997
101	"The Kotodama User's Trap!"	Hiroyuki Kakudō	Natsuhiko Kyogoku	Kazue Kinoshita	Masazumi Matsumiya	December 28, 1997
102	"Atrocious! The Chinese Yōkai Xingtian"	Masayuki Akehi	Daisuke Yajima	Masahiro Naoi	Masazumi Matsumiya	January 4, 1998
103	"Monster Rat! Yōkai Kyūso"	Takao Yoshizawa	Yukiyoshi Ohashi	Yoshitaka Yashima	Kenji Matsumoto	January 11, 1998
104	"Terror! The Island of the Vampire Yōkai"	Takenori Kawada	Daisuke Yajima	Setsuko Nobuzane	Masazumi Matsumiya	January 18, 1998
105	"Labyrinth: Yōkai Daruma's Kingdom"	Mamoru Hosoda	Hiroshi Hashimoto	Yukio Ebisawa	Masazumi Matsumiya	January 25, 1998
106	"Nightmare! Yōkai Hell"	Munehisa Sakai	Ryō Tamura	Toshio Deguchi	Ken Tokushige	February 1, 1998
107	"Mountain God: Anagura-Nyūdō"	Hiroki Shibata	Daisuke Yajima	Kazue Kinoshita	Masazumi Matsumiya	February 8, 1998
108	"Immortality! Neko-Shō"	Masayuki Akehi	Yukiyoshi Ohashi	Masahiro Naoi	Masazumi Matsumiya	February 15, 1998
109	"Mystery of the Snowy Mountains: Nobiagari"	Hiroyuki Kakudō	Daisuke Yajima	Yoshitaka Yashima	Kenji Matsumoto	February 22, 1998
110	"Rebellion of the 808 Tanuki"	Takenori Kawada	Yukiyoshi Ohashi	Setsuko Nobuzane	Masazumi Matsumiya	March 1, 1998
111	"Rebellion of the 808 Tanuki"	Masayuki Akehi	Yukiyoshi Ohashi	Toshio Deguchi	Tsutomu Fujita	March 8, 1998
112	"Yōkai Kihatsu and Kuro-Kamikiri"	Munehisa Sakai	Ryō Tamura	Masahiro Naoi	Masazumi Matsumiya	March 15, 1998
113	"Kitarō vs. The Three Assassins!"	Mamoru Hosoda	Story by : Kyōtarō Kimura; Teleplay by : Daisuke Yajima	Daisuke Yajima	Ken Tokushige	March 22, 1998
114	"Desperate Situation! Shinigami's Trap"	Takenori Kawada	Junki Takegami	Yukio Ebisawa	Masazumi Matsumiya	March 29, 1998

=== 2007 ===
No.	Title	Original release date
1	"The Street Where Yōkai Dwell"; Transliteration: "Yōkai no Sumu Machi" (Japanese: 妖怪の棲む街)	April 1, 2007
2	"BiBiBi!! Nezumi-Otoko!"; Transliteration: "BiBiBi!! Nezumi-Otoko!" (Japanese: ビビビ!! ねずみ男!)	April 8, 2007
3	"The Mysterious Melody! Yasha"; Transliteration: "Ayashiki Senritsu! Yasha" (Japanese: 妖しき旋律! 夜叉)	April 15, 2007
4	"Be a Man! Ittan-Momen"; Transliteration: "Otoko! Ittan-Momen" (Japanese: 男! 一反もめん)	April 22, 2007
5	"The Cursed Movie"; Transliteration: "Norowareta Eiga" (Japanese: 呪われた映画)	April 29, 2007
6	"Great Panic! Yōkai Yokochō"; Transliteration: "Dai Panikku! Yōkai Yokochō" (Japanese: 大パニック! 妖怪横町)	May 6, 2007
7	"Burn! Medama-Oyaji"; Transliteration: "Moero! Medama-Oyaji" (Japanese: 燃えろ! 目玉おやじ)	May 13, 2007
8	"An Old Adversary! Nurarihyon"; Transliteration: "Shukuteki! Nurarihyon" (Japanese: 宿敵! ぬらりひょん)	May 20, 2007
9	"The Ghost Train Goes to the Other World"; Transliteration: "Yūrei Densha Anoyo Iki" (Japanese: ゆうれい電車あの世行き)	May 27, 2007
10	"The Almighty God! Raijū"; Transliteration: "Araburu Kami! Raijū" (Japanese: 荒ぶる神! 雷獣)	June 3, 2007
11	"Obake Comedy"; Transliteration: "Obake Manzai" (Japanese: おばけ漫才)	June 10, 2007
12	"Ringtone from the Spirit World"; Transliteration: "Reikai kara no Chakushin-on" (Japanese: 霊界からの着信音)	June 17, 2007
13	"Working Hard! Nurikabe the Bodyguard"; Transliteration: "Funtō! Nurikabe Yōjinbō" (Japanese: 奮闘! ぬりかべ用心棒)	June 24, 2007
14	"Kitarō Dies!? Gyūki Reborn"; Transliteration: "Kitarō Shisu!? Gyūki Fukkatsu" (Japanese: 鬼太郎死す!? 牛鬼復活)	July 1, 2007
15	"Work! Medama-Oyaji"; Transliteration: "Hataraku! Medama-Oyaji" (Japanese: 働く! 目玉おやじ)	July 8, 2007
16	"Yōkai are Game Masters?!"; Transliteration: "Yōkai wa Gēmu no Tatsujin?!" (Japanese: 妖怪はゲームの達人?!)	July 15, 2007
17	"Wandering Priest Aobōzu"; Transliteration: "Sasurai no Aobōzu" (Japanese: さすらいの蒼坊主)	July 22, 2007
18	"Black Eyes that Glow in the Old Castle"; Transliteration: "Kojō ni Hikaru Kuroi Me" (Japanese: 古城に光る黒い眼)	August 5, 2007
19	"The Kappa Pond Sumo Tournament"; Transliteration: "Kappa-chi no Sumō Taikai" (Japanese: 河童池の相撲大会)	August 12, 2007
20	"Voice From the Darkness! Ghost Spot"; Transliteration: "Yami kara no Koe! Yūrei Supotto" (Japanese: 闇からの声! 幽霊スポット)	August 19, 2007
21	"Madly in Love? Yōkai Love Story"; Transliteration: "Kubittake? Yōkai Koi Monogatari" (Japanese: 首ったけ? 妖怪恋物語)	August 26, 2007
22	"Fake Kitarō Appears!!"; Transliteration: "Nise Kitarō Genru!!" (Japanese: ニセ鬼太郎現る!!)	September 2, 2007
23	"Sazae-Oni the Gourmet!?"; Transliteration: "Bishoku-ka!? Sazae-Oni" (Japanese: 美食家!? さざえ鬼)	September 9, 2007
24	"Battle in the Dreams! Makura-Gaeshi"; Transliteration: "Yume no Naka no Kettō! Makura-Gaeshi" (Japanese: 夢の中の決闘! 枕返し)	September 16, 2007
25	"The Great Yōkai Sports Festival"; Transliteration: "Yōkai Dai Undōkai" (Japanese: 妖怪大運動会)	September 23, 2007
26	"Yōkai Idol!? Amabie"; Transliteration: "Yōkai Aidoru!? Amabie" (Japanese: 妖怪アイドル!? アマビエ)	September 30, 2007
27	"The Law of Jigoku! Run, Nezumi Otoko"; Transliteration: "Jigoku no Okite! Hashire Nezumi-Otoko" (Japanese: 地獄の掟! 走れねずみ男)	October 7, 2007
28	"Dinosaur Kitarō Appears!"; Transliteration: "Kitarō Kyōryū Genru!" (Japanese: 鬼太郎恐竜現る!)	October 14, 2007
29	"Neko-Musume's Yōkai Bus Tour"; Transliteration: "Neko-Musume no Yōkai Basu Tsuā" (Japanese: ネコ娘の妖怪バスツアー)	October 21, 2007
30	"Strategy to Kill Kitarō"; Transliteration: "Kitarō Massatsu Sakusen" (Japanese: 鬼太郎抹殺作戦)	October 28, 2007
31	"Yōkai Top Spinning Match!"; Transliteration: "Yōkai koma-mawashi shōbu!" (Japanese: 妖怪コマ回し勝負!)	November 4, 2007
32	"Landing! The Threat of Western Yōkai"; Transliteration: "Jōriku! Kyōi no Seiyō Yōkai" (Japanese: 上陸! 脅威の西洋妖怪)	November 11, 2007
33	"Great Counterattack! Japanese Yōkai"; Transliteration: "Dai Gyakushū! Nihon Yōkai" (Japanese: 大逆襲! 日本妖怪)	November 18, 2007
34	"Yōkai Yokochō's Cruise to Hell"; Transliteration: "Yōkai Yokochō no Jigoku Nagashi" (Japanese: 妖怪横丁の地獄流し)	November 25, 2007
35	"Shinigami's Paradise Tour"; Transliteration: "Shinigami no Gokuraku Tsuā" (Japanese: 死神の極楽ツアー)	December 2, 2007
36	"Medama-Oyaji's Rescue"; Transliteration: "Resukyū Medama-Oyaji" (Japanese: レスキュー目玉おやじ)	December 9, 2007
37	"Kitarō Defeated! Hatred of Kihatsu"; Transliteration: "Kitarō Haiboku! On'nen no Kihatsu" (Japanese: 鬼太郎敗北! 怨念の鬼髪)	December 16, 2007
38	"Nezumi-Otoko Becomes A Daddy"; Transliteration: "Papa ni natta Nezumi-Otoko" (Japanese: パパになったねずみ男)	December 23, 2007
39	"Nurarihyon's Last Day"; Transliteration: "Nurarihyon Saigo no Hi" (Japanese: ぬらりひょん最期の日)	January 6, 2008
40	"Big Fever! Kitarō Goods"; Transliteration: "Dai Fībā! Kitarō Guzzu" (Japanese: 大フィーバー! 鬼太郎グッズ)	January 13, 2008
41	"Overthrow Kitarō! Nezumi-Otoko's Great Counterattack"; Transliteration: "Datō Kitarō! Nezumi-Otoko Dai Gyakushū" (Japanese: 打倒鬼太郎! ねずみ男大逆襲)	January 20, 2008
42	"Yōkai of Obebe Swamp Kawauso!"; Transliteration: "Obebe-numa no Yōkai Kawauso!" (Japanese: オベベ沼の妖怪かわうそ!)	January 27, 2008
43	"Mysterious Yōkai Train"; Transliteration: "Yōkai Misuterī Ressha!" (Japanese: 妖怪ミステリー列車!)	February 3, 2008
44	"A Rugged Medama-Oyaji!"; Transliteration: "Choi'aku! Medama-Oyaji" (Japanese: チョイ悪!目玉おやじ)	February 10, 2008
45	"Neko-Musume Abuzz!? Yōkai Maid Cafe"; Transliteration: "Neko-Musume Sōzen!? Yōkai Meido Kissa" (Japanese: ネコ娘騒然!? 妖怪メイド喫茶)	February 17, 2008
46	"Banquet of the Snake Woman, Gorgon"; Transliteration: "Hebi-Onna Gōgon no Bansan-kai" (Japanese: ヘビ女ゴーゴンの晩餐会)	February 24, 2008
47	"The Great Yōkai Trial"; Transliteration: "Yōkai Dai-Saiban" (Japanese: 妖怪大裁判)	March 2, 2008
48	"Fight! GeGeGe House"; Transliteration: "Tatakau! GeGeGe Hausu" (Japanese: 戦う! ゲゲゲハウス)	March 9, 2008
49	"The Seven Misaki of the Other World"; Transliteration: "Anoyo no Shichinin Misaki" (Japanese: あの世の七人ミサキ)	March 16, 2008
50	"The Cursed Bride! Onmoraki"; Transliteration: "Noroi no Hanayome! Onmoraki" (Japanese: 呪いの花嫁! 陰摩羅鬼)	March 23, 2008
51	"Neko-Musume's Tokyo Yōkai Sightseeing"; Transliteration: "Neko-Musume no Tōkyō Yōkai Kenbutsu" (Japanese: ネコ娘の東京妖怪見物)	March 30, 2008
52	"Terror! Yadōkai"; Transliteration: "Kyōfu! Yadōkai" (Japanese: 恐怖! 夜道怪)	April 6, 2008
53	"Viva Hakusanbō! Haunted House"; Transliteration: "Hakusanbō Biba! Obake Yashi" (Japanese: 白山坊ビバ！お化け屋敷)	April 13, 2008
54	"Vampire Elite"; Transliteration: "Kyūketsuki Erīto" (Japanese: 吸血鬼エリート)	April 20, 2008
55	"The Curse of Hyakume"; Transliteration: "Hyakume no Noroi" (Japanese: 百目の呪い)	April 27, 2008
56	"The Forbidden Cape! Iso-Onna"; Transliteration: "Kinjirareta Misaki! Iso-Onna" (Japanese: 禁じられた岬！磯女)	May 4, 2008
57	"The Legendary Yōkai Nue!!"; Transliteration: "Densetsu no Dai Yōkai Nue!!" (Japanese: 伝説の大妖怪鵺!!)	May 11, 2008
58	"Pet Yōkai! Shiro-Uneri"; Transliteration: "Petto Yōkai! Shiro-Uneri" (Japanese: ペット妖怪! 白うねり)	May 18, 2008
59	"Gremlins Landing in Tokyo!!"; Transliteration: "Guremurin Tōkyō Jōriku!!" (Japanese: グレムリン東京上陸!!)	May 25, 2008
60	"Work!! Yōkai Bari-Bari"; Transliteration: "Hatarake!! Yōkai Bari-Bari" (Japanese: 働け!! 妖怪バリバリ)	June 1, 2008
61	"Tantanbō of the Yōkai Castle"; Transliteration: "Yōkai-jō no Tantanbō" (Japanese: 妖怪城のたんたん坊)	June 8, 2008
62	"Kubire-Oni Beckons Death"; Transliteration: "Kubire-Oni ga Shi o Maneku" (Japanese: くびれ鬼が死をまねく)	June 15, 2008
63	"Japanese Yōkai Annihilated!? Yōkai Cloth!!"; Transliteration: "Nihon Yōkai Zenmetsu!? Yōkai Tanmono!!" (Japanese: 日本妖怪全滅!? 妖怪反物!!)	June 22, 2008
64	"The Night of Mōryō"; Transliteration: "Mōryō no Yoru" (Japanese: もうりょうの夜)	June 29, 2008
65	"Curse of the Dancing Bird! Ubume"; Transliteration: "Noroi no Tori! Ubume ga Mau" (Japanese: 呪いの鳥! うぶめが舞う)	July 6, 2008
66	"Sara-Kozō, Yōkai Chart Topper!"; Transliteration: "Sarakozō! Yōkai Hitto Chāto" (Japanese: さら小僧! 妖怪ヒットチャート)	July 13, 2008
67	"Bloodsucking Tree! Jubokko"; Transliteration: "Aruku Kyūketsu-ju! Jubokko" (Japanese: 歩く吸血樹! 樹木子)	July 20, 2008
68	"Huge Battle of Hell! All of the Western Yōkai Appear"; Transliteration: "Jigoku Chō Kessen! Seiyō Yōkai Sō Tōjō!" (Japanese: 地獄超決戦! 西洋妖怪総登場!)	August 3, 2008
69	"Kitarō's Catastrophe! Anagura-Nyūdō"; Transliteration: "Kitarō Dai iIhen! Anagura-Nyūdō" (Japanese: 鬼太郎大異変! 穴ぐら入道)	August 10, 2008
70	"Impossible to Kill!? Dorotabō"; Transliteration: "Taiji Fukanō!? Dorotabō" (Japanese: 退治不可能!? 泥田坊)	August 17, 2008
71	"Southern Yōkai Landing in Japan!!"; Transliteration: "Nanpō Yōkai Nihon Jōriku!!" (Japanese: 南方妖怪 日本上陸!!)	August 24, 2008
72	"Yōkai Castle Awakens!! Shu-no-Bon's Difficult War Story"; Transliteration: "Yōkai-jō Shidō!! Shu-no-Bon Fun-Senki" (Japanese: 妖怪城始動!! 朱の盆奮戦記)	August 31, 2008
73	"Mystery of the Forty Seven Yōkai Warriors"; Transliteration: "Yōkai Shijūshichi-Shi no Nazo" (Japanese: 妖怪四十七士の謎)	September 7, 2008
74	"Ittan-Momen! The Kagoshima Battle!!"; Transliteration: "Ittan-Momen! Kagoshima Kessen!!" (Japanese: 一反もめん! 鹿児島決戦!!)	September 14, 2008
75	"Miage-Nyūdō's Yōkai School"; Transliteration: "Miage-Nyūdō no Yōkai Gakkō" (Japanese: 見上げ入道の妖怪学校)	September 21, 2008
76	"Strongest Tag Battle!! Southern & Chinese Yōkai!!"; Transliteration: "Saikyō Taggu!! Nanpō & Chūgoku Yōkai!!" (Japanese: 最強タッグ!! 南方&中国妖怪!!)	September 28, 2008
77	"Yuki-Onna! Beautiful Vengeful Demon"; Transliteration: "Yuki-Onna! Utsukushiki Fukushū Oni" (Japanese: 雪女! 美しき復讐鬼)	October 5, 2008
78	"The Angry Undead! Hidarugami"; Transliteration: "Okoreru Mōja-tachi! Hidarugami" (Japanese: 怒れる亡者たち! ヒダル神)	October 12, 2008
79	"The Tenacious Mythological Snake! Tsuchinoko!!"; Transliteration: "Shūnen no Yōja! Tsuchinoko!!" (Japanese: 執念の妖蛇! 槌の子!!)	October 19, 2008
80	"Beautiful Woman and Nebutori! Continuous Yōkai Incidents"; Transliteration: "Bijo to Nebutori! Renzoku Yōkai Jiken" (Japanese: 美女と寝太り! 連続妖怪事件)	October 26, 2008
81	"Duel!! Yōkai Hunter vs. Hari-Onago"; Transliteration: "Kettō!! Yōkai Hantā tai Hari-Onago" (Japanese: 決闘!! 妖怪ハンター対針女)	November 2, 2008
82	"Parched Life! Akashita Hot Spring"; Transliteration: "Inochi Kara Kara! Akashita Onsen" (Japanese: 命カラカラ! 赤舌温泉)	November 9, 2008
83	"Burn! Azuki Union"; Transliteration: "Moero! Azuki Rengō" (Japanese: 燃えろ! 小豆連合)	November 16, 2008
84	"Noderabō! The Bell Which Echoes in the Darkness of Night"; Transliteration: "Noderabō! Yoru no Yami ni Hibiku Kane" (Japanese: 野寺坊! 夜の闇に響く鐘)	November 23, 2008
85	"Kitarō Screams!! Yōkai Castle's Secret Weapon!!"; Transliteration: "Kitarō Zekkyō!! Yōkai-jō no Kirifuda!!" (Japanese: 鬼太郎絶叫!! 妖怪城の切り札!!)	November 30, 2008
86	"Fear Approaching From Behind! Ushirogami"; Transliteration: "Haigo ni Semaru Kyōfu! Ushirogami" (Japanese: 背後に迫る恐怖! 後神)	December 7, 2008
87	"Titan! The Golem's Tears"; Transliteration: "Kyojin! Gōremu no Namida" (Japanese: 巨人! ゴーレムの涙)	December 14, 2008
88	"Yōkai Do-or-Die Spirit!! Hell Traversing Quiz!!"; Transliteration: "Yōkai Kesshi!! Jigoku Ōdan Kuizu!!" (Japanese: 妖怪決死!! 地獄横断クイズ!!)	December 21, 2008
89	"Miracle of Shiwasu! Kitarō is Very Busy!!"; Transliteration: "Shiwasu no Kiseki! Kitarō Dai Isogashi!!" (Japanese: 師走の奇跡! 鬼太郎大いそがし!!)	December 28, 2008
90	"New Year's Great Rampage! Kitarō-Kasha"; Transliteration: "Shin'nen Dai Bōsō! Kitarō Kasha" (Japanese: 新年大暴走!鬼太郎火車)	January 11, 2009
91	"Yōkai Teacher of Brush Writing! Hitotsume-Kozō"; Transliteration: "Yōkai Fudeshi! Hitotsume-Kozō" (Japanese: 妖怪筆師!一つ目小僧)	January 18, 2009
92	"Violent!! Yōkai Waterwheel!! Good Luck Nami-Kozō"; Transliteration: "Mōretsu!! Yōkai Suisha!! Ganbare Nami-Kozō" (Japanese: 猛烈!! 妖怪水車!! がんばれ浪小僧)	January 25, 2009
93	"The Obake Building's Yōkai Gentleman!"; Transliteration: "Obake Biru no Yōkai Shinshi!" (Japanese: おばけビルの妖怪紳士!)	February 1, 2009
94	"The True Form of the Guardian of Okinawa, Shisa!"; Transliteration: "Okinawa no Mamorigami Shīsā no Shōtai!" (Japanese: 沖縄の守り神シーサーの正体!)	February 8, 2009
95	"Yōkai Sweets! Operation Valentine"; Transliteration: "Yōkai Suītsu! Barentain Sakusen" (Japanese: 妖怪スイーツ! バレンタイン作戦)	February 15, 2009
96	"Strange Romance! The Yōka's Invitation"; Transliteration: "Kaiki Roman! Yōka no Sasoi" (Japanese: 怪奇ロマン! 妖花の誘い)	February 22, 2009
97	"Shock!! Kitarō Becomes a Cat!"; Transliteration: "Shōgeki!! Kitarō Neko ni naru!" (Japanese: 衝撃!! 鬼太郎猫になる!)	March 1, 2009
98	"Oyaji's Hyperemia!! Hero Kitarō!!"; Transliteration: "Oyaji Dai Jūketsu!! Yūsha Kitarō!!" (Japanese: おやじ大充血!! 勇者鬼太郎!!)	March 8, 2009
99	"The City's Castle Tower! Yōkai Kame-hime"; Transliteration: "Tokai no Tenshukaku! Yōkai Kame-hime" (Japanese: 都会の天守閣! 妖怪亀姫)	March 15, 2009
100	"Farewell, Father! The Threat of the Tengu King"; Transliteration: "Saraba Chichi yo! Kyōi no Tengu-Ō" (Japanese: さらば父よ! 脅威の天狗王)	March 29, 2009

=== Hakaba Kitarō (2008) ===
No.	Title	Original release date
1	"The Birth of Kitaro"; Transliteration: "Kitarō Tanjō" (Japanese: 鬼太郎誕生)	January 10, 2008
2	"Yasha vs Dracula IV"; Transliteration: "Yasha tai Dorakyura Yonsei" (Japanese: 夜叉対ドラキュラ四世)	January 17, 2008
3	"The Vampire Tree"; Transliteration: "Kyūketsu-ki" (Japanese: 吸血木)	January 24, 2008
4	"Neko"; Transliteration: "Neko" (Japanese: 寝子)	January 31, 2008
5	"The Fake Kitaro"; Transliteration: "Nise Kitarō" (Japanese: ニセ鬼太郎)	February 7, 2008
6	"The Water God"; Transliteration: "Mizugami-sama" (Japanese: 水神様)	February 14, 2008
7	"The Wolfman and the Ghost Train"; Transliteration: "Jinrō to Yūrei Resha" (Japanese: 人狼と幽霊列車)	February 21, 2008
8	"The Bizarre Showdown"; Transliteration: "Kaiki Ichiban Shōbu" (Japanese: 怪奇一番勝負)	February 28, 2008
9	"Johnny in the Mist"; Transliteration: "Kiri no Naka Jonii" (Japanese: 霧の中のジョニー)	March 6, 2008
10	"Brigadoon"; Transliteration: "Burigadōn" (Japanese: ブリガドーン)	March 13, 2008
11	"A Foolish Man"; Transliteration: "Aho na Otoko" (Japanese: アホな男)	March 20, 2008

=== 2018 ===
No.	Title (Note: All English episode titles taken from Crunchyroll.)	Original release date
1	"The Day Yokai Awoke"; Transliteration: "Yōkai ga Mezameta Hi" (Japanese: 妖怪が目覚めた日)	April 1, 2018
ft. 吸血木 vampire tree and のびあがり stretcher/tiptoe stander
2	"Terrifying! Miage-Nyūdō"; Transliteration: "Senritsu! Miage-Nyūdō" (Japanese: 戦慄!見上げ入道)	April 8, 2018
ft. 見上げ入道 look-up bald monkster
3	"Tantanbo's Yokai Castle"; Transliteration: "Tantanbō no Yōkai-Jō" (Japanese: たんたん坊の妖怪城)	April 15, 2018
ft. たんたん坊 flowy boy 鎌鼬 weasel whirlwind 二口女 two-mouthed woman
4	"The Taboo of the Mysterious Forest"; Transliteration: "Fushigi no Mori no Kinki" (Japanese: 不思議の森の禁忌)	April 22, 2018
ft.
5	"The Disaster of the Electric Yokai"; Transliteration: "Denkiyōkai no Saiyaku" (Japanese: 電気妖怪の災厄)	April 29, 2018
ft. 雷の妖怪 thunderbolt apparition
6	"The Misfortune of the Sunekosuri"; Transliteration: "Yaku'un no Sunekosuri" (Japanese: 厄運のすねこすり)	May 6, 2018
ft. すねこすり shin rubber
7	"Ghost Train"; Transliteration: "Yūrei Densha" (Japanese: 幽霊電車)	May 13, 2018
8	"Menace! Kagami Jijii's plot" Transliteration: "Kyōi! Kagami-Jijī no Keiryaku" (Japanese: 驚異！鏡じじいの計略)	May 20, 2018
ft. 鏡爺 mirror geezer がしゃどくろ cracking skull
9	"The Kappa's Work Reform"; Transliteration: "Kappa no Hataraki-Kata Kaikaku" (Japanese: 河童の働き方改革)	May 27, 2018
ft. 河童 riverlings
10	"Vanishing! The Seven School Mysteries"; Transliteration: "Shōmetsu! Gakkō no Nana-Fushigi" (Japanese: 消滅！学校の七不思議)	June 3, 2018
ft. トイレのはなこさん Ms. Hanako of the toilet
11	"Conquer Japan! The 808 Tanuki Army"; Transliteration: "Nihon Seifuku! Happiakuya Tanuki Gundan" (Japanese: 日本征服！八百八狸軍団)	June 10, 2018
ft. 刑部狸 penal affairs tanuki
12	"Capital Annihilated! The Terrifying Yokai Beast"; Transliteration: "Shuto Kaimetsu! Kyōfu no Yōkai-Jū" (Japanese: 首都壊滅！恐怖の妖怪獣)	June 17, 2018
13	"Diamonds Of Greed! Wanyudo's Trap"; Transliteration: "Yokubō no Kongōseki! Wanyuudō no Wana" (Japanese: 欲望の金剛石！輪入道の罠)	June 24, 2018
ft. 輪入道 wheel monkster
14	"Makura-Gaeshi And The Fantastic Dream"; Transliteration: "Makura Gaeshi to Maboroshi no Yume" (Japanese: まくら返しと幻の夢)	July 1, 2018
ft. 枕返し pillow flip
15	"Zunbera Spiritplasty"; Transliteration: "Zunbera Reikei Shujutsu" (Japanese: ずんべら霊形手術)	July 8, 2018
ft. ずんべら坊/野箆坊 featureless one
16	"The Mystery Of The Tide! Umizato"; Transliteration: "Ushio no Kai! Umizatō" (Japanese: 潮の怪！海座頭)	July 15, 2018
ft. 海座頭 ocean blind
17	"Kani-Bozu And The Ancient Mystery"; Transliteration: "Kani-Bōzu to Inishie no Nazo" (Japanese: 蟹坊主と古の謎)	July 22, 2018
18	"Kawauso's Lie"; Transliteration: "Kawauso no Uso" (Japanese: かわうそのウソ)	July 29, 2018
ft. 川獺 river otter
19	"Yokai Resurrection?! The Ghost School"; Transliteration: "Fukkatsu Yōkai!? Obake no Gakkō" (Japanese: 復活妖怪!?おばけの学校)	August 5, 2018
ft. 見上げ入道, たんたん坊, 鎌鼬, 二口女
20	"Memories Of The Yoka"; Transliteration: "Yōka no Kioku" (Japanese: 妖花の記憶)	August 12, 2018
21	"Flame on! The Solitude of the Takuro-Bi"; Transliteration: "Enjō! Takurō-Bi no Kodoku" (Japanese: 炎上！たくろう火の孤独)	August 19, 2018
22	"Berserk!! The Terrifying Yokai, Gyuki"; Transliteration: "Bōsō!! Saikyō Yōkai Gyūki" (Japanese: 暴走!! 最恐妖怪牛鬼)	August 26, 2018
23	"The Yokai Apartment Secret Story"; Transliteration: "Yōkai Apāto Hiwa" (Japanese: 妖怪アパート秘話)	September 2, 2018
24	"Rat Man's Disappearance?! Sekiyo's Trap"; Transliteration: "Nezumi-Otoko Shissō!? Sekiyō no Wana" (Japanese: ねずみ男失踪!? 石妖の罠)	September 16, 2018
25	"Kubire-Oni's Curse"; Transliteration: "Kubire-Oni no Jūso" (Japanese: くびれ鬼の呪詛)	September 23, 2018
26	"Infatuation! The Alluring Gahi"; Transliteration: "Kowaku! Uruwashi no Gahi" (Japanese: 蠱惑！麗しの画皮)	September 30, 2018
27	"Invasion! The Backbeard Army"; Transliteration: "Shūrai! Bakkubeādo Gundan" (Japanese: 襲来！バックベアード軍団)	October 7, 2018
28	"The Great Yokai War"; Transliteration: "Yōkai Dai Sensō" (Japanese: 妖怪大戦争)	October 14, 2018
29	"The Mad Frankenstein"; Transliteration: "Kyōki no Furankenshutain" (Japanese: 狂気のフランケンシュタイン)	October 21, 2018
30	"The Vampire's Halloween Party"; Transliteration: "Kyūketsuki no Harowin Pātī" (Japanese: 吸血鬼のハロウィンパーティー)	October 28, 2018
31	"Azuki-Arai, Azuki-Hakari, Azuki-Babaa"; Transliteration: "Azuki-Arai, Azuki-Hakari, Azuki-Babā" (Japanese: 小豆洗い小豆はかり小豆婆)	November 4, 2018
32	"Demon Belial The Hundred-Year Grudge"; Transliteration: "Akuma Beriaru Hyakunen no Ensa" (Japanese: 悪魔ベリアル 百年の怨嗟)	November 11, 2018
33	"The Fox's Wedding And Hakusanbo"; Transliteration: "Kitsune no Yomeiri to Hakusanbō" (Japanese: 狐の嫁入りと白山坊)	November 18, 2018
34	"Emperor Backbeard"; Transliteration: "Teiō Bakkubeādo" (Japanese: 帝王バックベアード)	November 25, 2018
35	"The Witches Of Destiny"; Transliteration: "Unmei no Majo-Tachi" (Japanese: 運命の魔女たち)	December 9, 2018
36	"The Transform All Japanese Yokai Project"; Transliteration: "Nihon-Zen Yōkai-Ka Keikaku" (Japanese: 日本全妖怪化計画)	December 16, 2018
37	"Showdown!! Backbeard"; Transliteration: "Kessen!! Bakkubeādo" (Japanese: 決戦!! バックベアード)	December 23, 2018
38	"New Year's Man-Eating Fable Kasha"; Transliteration: "Shinshun Shokujin Kitan Kasha" (Japanese: 新春食人奇譚火車)	January 6, 2019
39	"Yuki-Onna Pure White Love Report"; Transliteration: "Yuki-Onna Junpaku Renai Hakusho" (Japanese: 雪女純白恋愛白書)	January 13, 2019
40	"The Final Ballad Sara-Kozo"; Transliteration: "Shūkyoku no Tanka Sara-Kozō" (Japanese: 終極の譚歌 さら小僧)	January 20, 2019
41	"Enigma! The Bake-Zori Rebellion"; Transliteration: "Kaiji! Bake-Zōri no Ran" (Japanese: 怪事！化け草履の乱)	January 27, 2019
42	"Momon-Jii's Scheme The Great Yokai Trial"; Transliteration: "Momon-Jī no Kankei Yōkai Dai Saiban" (Japanese: 百々爺の姦計 妖怪大裁判)	February 3, 2019
43	"Eternal Life Odoro-Odoro"; Transliteration: "Eien no Inochi Odoro-Odoro" (Japanese: 永遠の命 おどろおどろ)	February 10, 2019
44	"Masquerade Nopperabo"; Transliteration: "Narisumashi Nopperabō" (Japanese: なりすましのっぺらぼう)	February 17, 2019
45	"The Truth Lies In The Thicket Of The Mannen-Dake"; Transliteration: "Shinsō wa Mannen-Dake no Yabu no Naka" (Japanese: 真相は万年竹の藪の中)	February 24, 2019
46	"The Cursed Doll Festival Mayuge"; Transliteration: "Noroi no Hinamatsuri Mayuge" (Japanese: 呪いのひな祭り 麻桶毛)	March 3, 2019
47	"The Baby-Stealing Ubume"; Transliteration: "Akago Sarai no Ubume" (Japanese: 赤子さらいの姑獲鳥)	March 17, 2019
48	"The Void Of Despair And Darkness"; Transliteration: "Zetsubō to Shikkoku no Kyomu" (Japanese: 絶望と漆黒の虚無)	March 24, 2019
49	"Nanashi And Mana"; Transliteration: "Nanashi to Mana" (Japanese: 名無しと真名)	March 31, 2019
50	"Messenger From the Underworld Nue"; Transliteration: "Jigoku Kara no Shisha Nue" (Japanese: 地獄からの使者 鵺)	April 7, 2019
51	"Enma-Diao's Secret Bargain"; Transliteration: "Enma-Daiō no Mitsuyaku" (Japanese: 閻魔大王の密約)	April 14, 2019
52	"Runaway Girl! The Forest of the Kinoko"; Transliteration: "Shōjo Shissō! Kinoko no Mori" (Japanese: 少女失踪！木の子の森)	April 21, 2019
53	"Narcissism Overload! Nuke-Kubi's Close Call!"; Transliteration: "Jikoai Bōhatsu! Nuke-Kubi Kikiippatsu" (Japanese: 自己愛暴発！ぬけ首危機一髪)	April 28, 2019
54	"Dorotabo, life and Earth"; Transliteration: "Dorotabō to Inochi to Daichi" (Japanese: 泥田坊と命と大地)	May 5, 2019
55	"Hihi's Harassment Hell"; Transliteration: "Hihi no Harasumento Jigoku" (Japanese: 狒々のハラスメント地獄)	May 12, 2019
56	"The Bewitching Melody Elite the Vampire"; Transliteration: "Miwaku no Senritsu Kyūketsuki Erīto" (Japanese: 魅惑の旋律 吸血鬼エリート)	May 19, 2019
57	"The Bloody Noble La Siene"; Transliteration: "Senketsu no Kikōshi Ra Sēnu" (Japanese: 鮮血の貴公子ラ・セーヌ)	May 26, 2019
58	"The Han-Gyojin's Strange Kamaboko Tale"; Transliteration: "Han-Gyojin no Kamaboko Kidan" (Japanese: 半魚人のかまぼこ奇談)	June 2, 2019
59	"Promise to The Female Yokai Ushirogami"; Transliteration: "Onna Yōkai Ushirogami Tono Yakusoku" (Japanese: 女妖怪・後神との約束)	June 9, 2019
60	"Pitch-Black Coldness The Yokai Buru-Buru"; Transliteration: "Shikkoku no Reiki Yōkai Buru-Buru" (Japanese: 漆黒の冷気 妖怪ぶるぶる)	June 16, 2019
61	"Tofu-Kozo's Mold Pandemic"; Transliteration: "Tofu-Kozō no Kabi Pandemikku" (Japanese: 豆腐小僧のカビパンデミック)	June 23, 2019
62	"The Four Generals of the Underworld Kurobozu's Trap"; Transliteration: "Jigoku no Yonshō Kurobōzu no Wana" (Japanese: 地獄の四将 黒坊主の罠)	June 30, 2019
63	"The Star Festival of Love The Yokai Flower"; Transliteration: "Koi no Tanabata Yōkaika" (Japanese: 恋の七夕妖怪花)	July 7, 2019
64	"The Heart's Darkness the Suiko Reflects"; Transliteration: "Suiko ga Utsusu Kokoro no Yami" (Japanese: 水虎が映す心の闇)	July 14, 2019
65	"Nation Founding Mabyo's Great Tottori Empire"; Transliteration: "Kenkoku!? Mabyō no Dai Tottori Teikoku" (Japanese: 建国!? 魔猫の大鳥取帝国)	July 21, 2019
66	"The Shinigami and Sakaiminato's Hidden Village"; Transliteration: "Shinigami to Sakaiminato no Kakure-Zato" (Japanese: 死神と境港の隠れ里)	July 28, 2019
67	"The Social Media Addict Versus The Jomon Man"; Transliteration: "SNS Chūdoku VS Jōmonjin" (Japanese: SNS中毒VS縄文人)	August 4, 2019
68	"Capital Punishment! exiled to the Underworld"; Transliteration: "Kyokkei! Jigoku Nagashi" (Japanese: 極刑！地獄流し)	August 11, 2019
69	"General of the Underworld The Kido, Ibukimaru"; Transliteration: "Jigoku no Yonshō Kidō Ibukimaru" (Japanese: 地獄の四将 鬼童伊吹丸)	August 18, 2019
70	"Spirit Affiction Mysterious Footprints"; Transliteration: "Reishō Ashiato no Kai" (Japanese: 霊障 足跡の怪)	August 25, 2019
71	"Karakasa's Umbrella Troubles"; Transliteration: "Karakasa no Kasa Wazurai" (Japanese: 唐傘の傘わずらい)	September 1, 2019
72	"Iyami the Yokai's Great Love Project"; Transliteration: "Yōkai Iyami no Iroboke Dai Sakusen" (Japanese: 妖怪いやみの色ボケ大作戦)	September 8, 2019
73	"The Yamata-no-Orochi of Greed"; Transliteration: "Yokubō no Yamata no Orochi" (Japanese: 欲望のヤマタノオロチ)	September 15, 2019
74	"The Fall of the Underworld?! Tamamo-no-Mae's Trap"; Transliteration: "Jigoku Hōkai!? Tamamo no Mae no Wana" (Japanese: 地獄崩壊！？玉藻前の罠)	September 22, 2019
75	"Kyubi no Kistune"; Transliteration: "Kyūbi no Kitsune" (Japanese: 九尾の狐)	September 29, 2019
76	"Nurarihyon's Ambition"; Transliteration: "Nurarihyon no Yabō" (Japanese: ぬらりひょんの野望)	October 6, 2019
77	"Vanishing Humans! Neko-Sennin's Revenge"; Transliteration: "Ningen Shōshitsu! Neko-Sennin no Fukushū" (Japanese: 人間消失! 猫仙人の復讐)	October 13, 2019
78	"The Moryo of Mukuro Village"; Transliteration: "Mukuro-mura no Mōryō" (Japanese: 六黒村の魍魎)	October 20, 2019
79	"Komori-Neko's Halloween Pandemonium"; Transliteration: "Kōmori-Neko no Harouin Dai Bakuhatsu" (Japanese: こうもり貓のハロウィン大爆発)	October 27, 2019
80	"Onmoraki's Trap"; Transliteration: "Onmoraki no Wana" (Japanese: おんもらきの罠)	November 10, 2019
81	"Hot Blooded Manga Artist The Yōkai Hiderigami"; Transliteration: "Nekketsu Mangaka Yōkai Hiderigami" (Japanese: 熱血漫画家 妖怪ひでり神)	November 17, 2019
82	"Geriatric Nuppeppo"; Transliteration: "Jijibaba Nuppeppō" (Japanese: 爺婆ぬっぺっぽう)	November 24, 2019
83	"Chain of Hatred The Yokai Hoko"; Transliteration: "Zōo no Rensa Yōkai Hōkō" (Japanese: 憎悪の連鎖 妖怪ほうこう)	December 1, 2019
84	"Chin-san, The Foreign Worker"; Transliteration: "Gaikokujin Rōdōsha Chin-san" (Japanese: 外国人労働者チンさん)	December 8, 2019
85	"The Giant, Daidarabotchi"; Transliteration: "Kyojin Daidarabocchi" (Japanese: 巨人ダイダラボッチ)	December 15, 2019
86	"Bloody Christmas"; Transliteration: "Senketsu no Kurisumasu" (Japanese: 鮮血のクリスマス)	December 22, 2019
87	"The Binbogami and The Zashiki-Warashi"; Transliteration: "Binbōgami to Zashiki-Warashi" (Japanese: 貧乏神と座敷童子)	January 5, 2020
88	"Rollo Cloth's Romance"; Transliteration: "Ittan-Momen no Koi" (Japanese: 一反もめんの恋)	January 12, 2020
89	"The Curse of Te-no-Me"; Transliteration: "Te-no-Me no Noroi" (Japanese: 手の目の呪い)	January 19, 2020
90	"Idol Legend Sazae-Oni"; Transliteration: "Aidoru Densetsu Sazae-Oni" (Japanese: アイドル伝説さざえ鬼)	January 26, 2020
91	"The Misty Night of Angkor Wat"; Transliteration: "Ankōru Watto no Kiri no Yoru" (Japanese: アンコールワットの霧の夜)	February 2, 2020
92	"The Writer is Ama-no-Jaku"; Transliteration: "Kōsei Sakka wa Ama-no-Jaku" (Japanese: 構成作家は天邪鬼)	February 9, 2020
93	"The Phantom Train"; Transliteration: "Maboroshi no Kisha" (Japanese: まぼろしの汽車)	February 16, 2020
94	"The Lazy Fujimi Hot Springs Bus Trip"; Transliteration: "Burari Fujimi Onsen Basu no Tabi" (Japanese: ぶらり富士見温泉バスの旅)	February 23, 2020
95	"The Great Yokai Alliance"; Transliteration: "Yōkai Dai Dōmei" (Japanese: 妖怪大同盟)	March 15, 2020
96	"The Second Great Yokai War"; Transliteration: "Dainiji Yōkai Dai Sensō" (Japanese: 第二次妖怪大戦争)	March 22, 2020
97	"The World You See Isn't All There Is"; Transliteration: "Mieteru Sekai ga Subete Janai" (Japanese: 見えてる世界が全てじゃない)	March 29, 2020
