= Undefined Fantastic Object =

2009 bullet hell video game

- Original CD-ROM cover with a silhouette of Byakuren Hijiri
- Developer: Team Shanghai Alice
- Publisher: Team Shanghai Alice
- Composer: Team Shanghai Alice
- Series: Touhou Project
- Platform: Windows
- Release: JP: 15 August 2009 (Note: Undefined Fantastic Object was sold on the second day of Comiket 76.)
- Genre: Bullet hell (danmaku)
- Mode: Single-player

Touhou Seirensen ~ Undefined Fantastic Object. (Japanese: 東方星蓮船 ～ Undefined Fantastic Object.; lit. "Star-Lotus Ship of the East") is the twelfth main game of the Touhou Project scrolling shooter series, by dōjin game circle Team Shanghai Alice. The game was released at the 76th Comiket on August 15, 2009, and then followed by a retail release on September 11, 2009, at doujinshi stores. Undefined Fantastic Object was the first Touhou game to introduce colored power-ups, which reward the player with extra lives, points and bombs when collected, a gameplay mechanic that would be used in multiple games later on in the series.

== Gameplay ==
Marisa attempting to destroy a large UFO

Undefined Fantastic Object is a danmaku game in which the player has to navigate through a total of six stages, killing enemies, dodging their projectiles, and fighting a boss halfway through, and at the end of each stage. The player's main method of attack is their shot, but they also have access to a limited number of spell cards (also referred to as bombs), whose exact properties depend on the character and shot type, but all spell cards will clear the screen of bullets, grant the player temporary invulnerability, and deal a large amount of damage. Unlike its predecessors Mountain of Faith and Subterranean Animism, bombs are given their own counter, rather than being attached to the player's shot power. Undefined Fantastic Object is the only Touhou game in which the player does not lose points when they die or use a spell card.

The game features three playable characters, Reimu, Marisa, and Sanae, each of whom have two shot types, one of which deals high damage, whereas the other has homing projectiles.

Some enemies in Undefined Fantastic Object have color-coded UFOs that circle around them, which will float around the stage when they are killed. Some UFOs will flicker, and change their color after a few seconds, though this can be negated if the player is in close proximity to them. When the player collects three UFOs of a specific color, a large UFO will appear onscreen, which must be destroyed within ten seconds to grant the player a large point bonus, and extra items, depending on its color. Red UFOs will give the player extra lives, green ones will give them extra spell cards, and blue ones will give them extra points. If the UFO is not destroyed within the time limit, it will disappear, preventing the player from acquiring its items.

== Plot ==
In Gensokyo, rumors circulate about a flying ship, that appears to be searching for something, which the rumors claim belong to the Seven Lucky Gods, and is loaded with treasure.

The player character meets Minamitsu Murasa, the captain of the ship, who explains that the UFOs they have been collecting are fragments of treasures that were once on the ship, which are being used to revive Byakuren Hijiri, a Buddhist monk who wants a place in which she, and other yōkai, can practice their powers freely.

In the Extra Stage, Marisa notices that the UFOs appear to be housing small snakes, which was the result of Nue Houjuu attaching the Seed of Unknown Form to them out of boredom. However, this goes against Byakuren's plans, and so after she is defeated, and the incident is resolved, Nue remains in hiding underground.

== Characters ==
=== Playable characters ===
- Reimu Hakurei — The miko of the Hakurei Shrine. She sets out to investigate the treasure ship thinking it is yet again the work of yōkai. She has the smallest hitbox of the available characters.
- Marisa Kirisame — A magician who lives in the Forest of Magic. She doesn't believe there are any treasures on the ship, but investigates out of curiosity. She is the fastest character, and can collect items more easily.
- Sanae Kochiya — The miko of the Moriya Shrine, who was playable for the first time in Undefined Fantastic Object. She investigates the ship under the recommendation of Kanako, the goddess of her shrine. She is the only character without a special ability.

=== Enemy characters ===
- Nazrin (ナズーリン): Stage 1 boss and stage 5 mid-boss. Being a leader of mice and a natural dowser, Nazrin was commanded by Ichirin to search for the shards that fell from the sky, but her dowsing rods brought her to the humans instead.
- Kogasa Tatara (多々良 小傘): Stage 2 boss and extra stage mid-boss. Kogasa was once an umbrella who was forgotten for a long time and thus became a kasa-obake. Being bored and lonely, she tries to perfect the art of scaring humans.
- Ichirin Kumoi (雲居 一輪): Ichirin is the stage 3 boss who is accompanied by Unzan, who also participates in battle. Ichirin, by her own accord, is the guard of the large ship in the sky. She seems to be collecting UFO-shaped shards to revive Byakuren Hijiri, her master, whom she refers to as "sister."
- Unzan (雲山): Ichirin's companion in stage 3. Unzan is a nyūdō made out of clouds. He is a stubborn, quiet old man who is gentle at heart.
- Minamitsu Murasa (村紗 水蜜): Murasa is the stage 4 boss, who is a funayūrei - a spirit of a human who fell off a ship and drowned in the past. As the humans feared her, their fears turned her into a yōkai. She pledged herself to saving Byakuren, riding the ship she created.
- Shou Toramaru (寅丸 星): Shou is the stage 5 boss, representing good fortune as an avatar of Bishamonten. She was chosen by Byakuren to have the mountain yōkai gather faith in exchange. When Byakuren disappeared after a few hundred years, the temple was in great disarray, and all of her friends who were sealed into the Earth returned. Shou, not wanting to run away or have any regrets, told Murasa and the others how to lift the seal.
- Byakuren Hijiri (聖 白蓮): Byakuren is the stage 6 boss. She had a younger brother, Myouren Hijiri, who taught her Buddhist magic, but died. This made Byakuren fear death greatly, and obtained the power to regain her youth. However, it was considered black magic rather than an art of Buddhism. Ichirin was her servant, while Murasa pledged herself to saving Byakuren.
- Nue Houjuu (封獣 ぬえ): Nue is the extra stage boss, also appearing as a sphere of light in stages 4 and 6. She is a nue- a mysterious yōkai who flies through the night sky. Despite being non-human, she was defeated by humans many times in the past, but the accounts of her appearance vary due to the fact she obscures her own appearance. She merely enjoys frightening humans and provoking their fear.

== Development ==
Undefined Fantastic Object was announced on ZUN's website on February 26, 2009, and the full game was released at Comiket on August 15.

Undefined Fantastic Object was released on Steam on June 6, 2020, alongside Mountain of Faith and Subterranean Animism.

== Reception ==
Game Rant ranked Undefined Fantastic Object as the best game in the Touhou series, writing that critics have praised it due to the game's "well-structured gameplay, detailed graphics, and memorable tracks".

== See also ==
- Rensenware, a joke ransomware written in 2017 requiring victims to play Undefined Fantastic Object in Lunatic mode and get at least 200 million points
