= Rensenware =

Joke ransomware

- An image of the Rensenware virus.
- Original author: Kangjun Heo
- Written in: C#
- Operating system: Windows
- Type: Ransomware
- License: GNU GPL (backend)
- Repository: GitHub

Rensenware (Korean: 련선웨어; Japanese: 蓮船ウェアー; stylized as rensenWare) is a ransomware that infects Windows computers. It was created as a joke by Kangjun Heo (허강준; alias "0x00000FF") and first appeared in 2017. Rensenware is unusual as an example of ransomware in that it does not request the user pay the creator of the virus to decrypt their files, instead requiring the user to achieve a required number of points in the shoot 'em up video game Undefined Fantastic Object (Note: Known as Touhou Seirensen (東方星蓮船) in Japanese) before any decryption can take place. The main window displays Minamitsu Murasa, a character from the game. Heo released a patch that neutralizes Rensenware after the malware gained attention.

== Description ==
Rensenware was developed by Korean undergraduate student and programmer Kangjun Heo for Windows operating systems out of boredom as a joke within the Touhou Project fandom. When executed, the program scans and encrypts files on the computer ending in specific extensions using AES-256 and appends ".RENSENWARE" to the filename. The ransomware was first discovered by MalwareHunterTeam on April 6, 2017.

=== Payload ===
Once the files have been encrypted, a warning window depicting the character Minamitsu Murasa from the Touhou Project is displayed, which cannot be closed. The program requires the user to play the bullet hell video game Touhou Seirensen ~ Undefined Fantastic Object, which is not included with the software meaning they must download it on their own, and score at least 200 million points in the "Lunatic" level of difficulty before any decryption may take place (the program automatically detects the game's process "th12" and its accumulated points). The payload window advises the user not to kill the Rensenware main program until their files have successfully been decrypted, otherwise they will lose them permanently as the decryption keys are not locally stored.

== Neutralisation tool ==
Heo later released a piece of software—setting the score in game's memory directly and satisfying the Rensenware requirements—onto GitHub with an apology. He also released a small part of the ransomware's source code without the payload.
