= Taka-nyūdō =

Yōkai

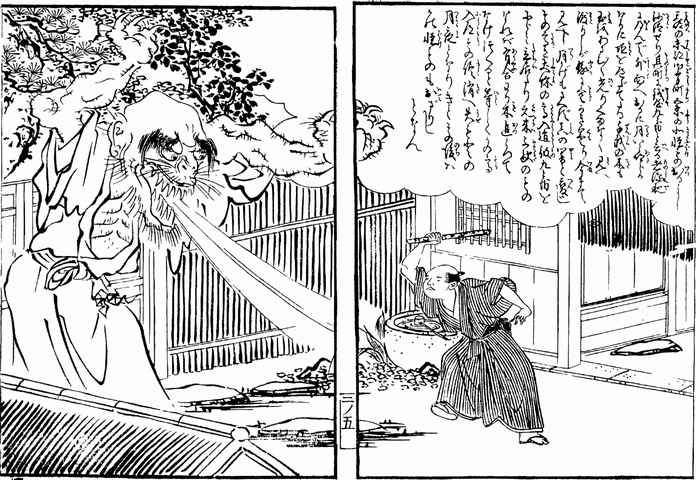
A Taka-nyūdō depicted under the title "The Strange Occurrence at Gokōmachi" from Vol. 2 of Ehon Sayoshigure by Shungyōsai Hayami.

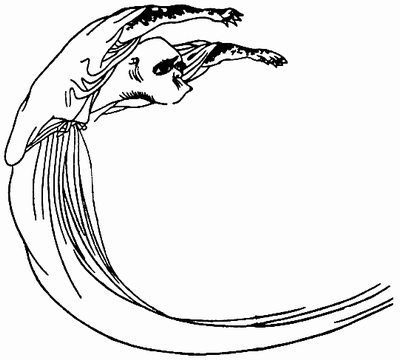
"Suppon no Bakemono" (Soft-shelled turtle monster) from Kaidan Tabi no Akebono.

Taka-nyūdō (高入道, literally "Tall Priest" or "Tall Monk") is a yōkai transmitted primarily in Shikoku and the Kinki region.

== Overview ==
Legends of this yōkai are primarily transmitted in Yamashirodani Village, Miyoshi District, Tokushima Prefecture (now Miyoshi City); Nawa, Nagao Town, Okawa District, Kagawa Prefecture (now Sanuki City); and Imazu, Nishinomiya, Hyōgo Prefecture. It is said to have appeared in Osaka City until around the 15th year of the Meiji era (c. 1882), and it was said that there was no one who did not know of it.

In Hyōgo, it is said to have appeared in the narrow alleyways of sake breweries. It would appear suddenly in front of people; as the person involuntarily looked up, the creature would grow taller and taller, reportedly becoming a giant that reached the heavens. It is a yōkai belonging to the same category as the Mikoshi-nyūdō, which possesses similar characteristics, and there is a theory that it is the same yōkai as the similarly named Takabōzu.

When encountering this creature in Hyōgo, it is said that if one brings a ruler and measures its height—"1 shaku (approx. 30.3 cm), 2 shaku, 3 shaku"—it will disappear. In Nawa, Kagawa Prefecture, it is said that if one bows without looking up and chants "I lost, I saw past you" (Maketa, mikoshita), it will disappear. Similarly, in Tokushima Prefecture, it is said to disappear if one chants "I saw past you, I saw past you" (Mikoshita, mikoshita).

According to the story "The Strange Occurrence at Gokōmachi" in the Edo period book Ehon Sayoshigure (Illustrated Book of Evening Rain), a Taka-nyūdō about 1 jō (approx. 3 meters) in height appeared in Gokōmachi, Kyoto at the end of the Tenmei era. It is said that when a person who encountered it threw a piece of wood at it in a panic, the figure vanished.

Regarding its true identity, in Hyōgo, it is said to be a shapeshifted Tanuki (raccoon dog) or Kitsune (fox). In Kagawa, it is attributed to a Kawauso (otter) or the work of a Tanuki standing on a human's shoulder. In Tokushima Prefecture, a Tanuki named "Ingen of Takasu" (Takasu no Ingen) is said to have shapeshifted into a Taka-nyūdō and challenged people to sumo wrestling. It was believed that if it won a sumo match against a fisherman, it promised a large catch, but if it lost, the catch would be poor; therefore, fishermen would try to curry favor with it by always intentionally losing the matches. Currently, it is enshrined as "Ingen Daimyōjin" in a small shrine on the Takasu Levee in Okinosu-cho, Tokushima City. Also, according to the old book Kaidan Tabi no Akebono, when a certain farmer made a living selling Suppon (soft-shelled turtles), the vengeful spirit of a vindictive Suppon appeared as a Taka-nyūdō with a height of ten jō (approx. 30 meters). (See also Soft-shelled turtle#Folklore and Tradition).

== See also ==
- List of legendary creatures from Japan
