= Mikoshi-nyūdō =

Type of bald-headed yōkai

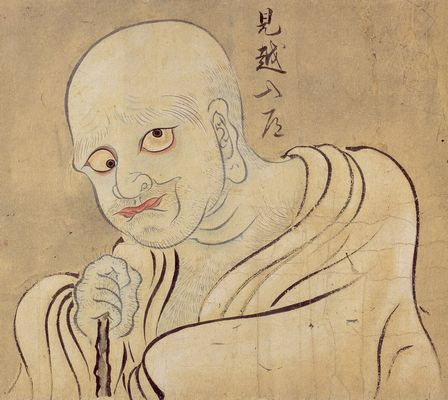
"Mikoshi-nyūdō (見越入道)" from the Hyakkai Zukan by Sawaki Suushi

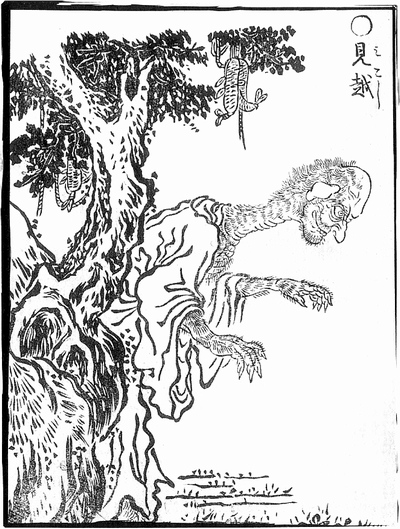
"Mikoshi (見越)" from the Gazu Hyakki Yagyō by Sekien Toriyama

Mikoshi-nyūdō (見越し入道 or 見越入道) is a type of bald-headed yōkai "goblin" with an ever-extending neck. In Japanese folklore and Edo period (1603–1868) kaidan "ghost story" texts, mikoshi-nyūdō will frighten people who look over the top of things such as byōbu folding screens. The name combines mikoshi 見越し (lit. "see over") "looking over the top (of a fence); anticipation; expectation" and nyūdō 入道 (lit. "enter the Way") "a (Buddhist) priest; a bonze; a tonsured monster".

== Summary ==
When walking to the end of a road at night or a hill road, something the shape of a monk would suddenly appear, and if one looks up, it becomes taller the further one looks up. They are so big that one would look up at them, and thus are given the name "miage-nyūdō (見上げ入道, look up nyūdō)." Sometimes, if one just looks at them like that, one might die, but they can be made to disappear by saying "mikoshita (見こした, I've seen past you)." They most frequently appear when walking alone on night paths, but they are also said to appear at intersections, stone bridges, and above trees.

It is said that getting flown over by a mikoshi-nyūdō results in death or getting strangled by the throat, and if one falls back due to looking up at the nyūdō, one's windpipe would get gnawed at and killed.

On Iki Island off Kyushu, a mikoshi-nyūdō would make a "wara wara" sound like the swaying of bamboo, so by immediately chanting, "I have seen past the mikoshi-nyūdō (見越し入道見抜いた, mikoshi-nyūdō wo minuita)," the nyūdō would be made to disappear, but it is said that if one simply goes past them without saying anything, bamboo would fall resulting in death. In the Oda District, Okayama Prefecture, it is said that when one meets a mikoshi-nyūdō, it is vital to lower one's vision to the bottom of one's feet, and if one instead looks up to the head from the feet, one would be eaten and killed. Other than chanting "mikoshita (seen past)" or "minuita (seen through)," there are also examples where they would disappear by mustering one's courage and smoking tobacco (Kanagawa Prefecture), or by calculating the height of the mikoshi-nyūdō by a margin (Shizuoka Prefecture), among other methods.

In the essay Enka Kidan (煙霞綺談) by Hakuchō Nishimura from the Edo period, the mikoshi-nyūdō is a yakubyōgami that inflicts people with fever, and there is a story as follows:

In the Shōtoku era, in Yoshida, Mikawa Province (now Toyohashi, Aichi Prefecture), the merchant Zen'emon, while on the way to Denma in Nagoya, encountered a whirlwind, and the horse he rode on started to have its feet hurt, and when Zen'emon also felt unwell and started crouching, an ōnyūdō with a height of about one to and three or four shaku (about four meters) appeared. The nyūdō was almost like Nio, and as the eyes shone like mirrors, Zen'emon came closer. When Zen'emon trembled in fear and lay down on the ground, the nyūdō jumped over him and went away. At dawn, Zan'emon stopped by a private house and when he asked, "Are there strange things like tengu around here?" he received the reply, "Isn't that what's called a mikoshi-nyūdō?" Afterward, Zen'emon reached his destination of Nagoya, but he lost his appetite, was afflicted by a fever, and even medical treatment and drugs had no effect, and died on the 13th day.

In a certain region of the Okayama Prefecture, if a female squats at a toilet, a fox (kitsune) shapeshifted into a mikoshi-nyūdō would appear and say menacingly, "Wipe your butt? Wipe your butt? (尻拭こうか、尻拭こうか)." Also, it is said that on the night of Ōmisoka, by chanting "mikoshi-nyūdō, hototogisu" while at a toilet, a mikoshi-nyūdō would definitely appear. Concerning legends like these relating to toilets, there is the theory that they may have been confused with the kanbari-nyūdō.

== True identity of mikoshi ==
There are many where the true identity of mikoshi-nyūdō is unclear, but there are regions where they are animals that possess the ability to transform. In the legends of Hinoemata, Minamiaizu District, Fukushima Prefecture, they are shapeshifted weasels, and it is said that if one gets lured to look up from the nyūdō's expansion, the weasel would take that opening and bite at one's throat. In the "Tonoigusa," they are shapeshifted tanuki, and there are also some regions where they are shapeshifted foxes (kitsune). In the Shinano Province (now Nagano Prefecture), they are said to be shapeshifted mujina. Also, in the aforementioned Hinoemata, it is said that the mikoshi-nyūdō's true form is a hand-held object like a paper lantern, bucket, or rudder, and that it would be possible to exterminate the nyūdō by striking at the object.

== Similar tales ==
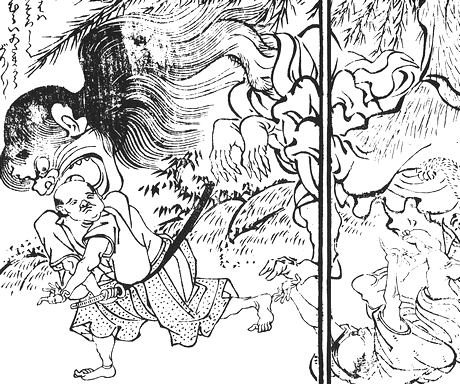
"Bakemono Chakutōchō" by Masayoshi Kitao. An ama-nyūdō that would gnaw at humans is depicted.

Yōkai similar to the mikoshi-nyūdō, such as the shidaidaka, the taka-nyūdō, the taka-bōzu, the nobiagari, the norikoshi-nyūdō, the miage-nyūdō, the nyūdō-bōzu, the yanbon, etc. throughout the country.

At Uminokuchi, Minamimaki, Minamisaku District, Nagano Prefecture, Akadani, Kitakanbara District, Niigata Prefecture (now Shibata), Kamikawane, Haibara District, Shizuoka Prefecture (now Honwane), Mikura, Shūchi District, also Shizuoka Prefecture (now Mori) among other places, they are told in legends simply under the name "mikoshi." In Kamikawane, there is a story where in the past, two young fellows discovered nobori-like object climbing up the night sky, and were surprised, saying "It's a mikoshi!"

Also, in Ryōgōchi, Ihara District, Shizuoka Prefecture (now Shizuoka), they are also called omikoshi (お見越し), and it is said that something with the appearance of a little bōzu would talk to people at the end of a road, and in the middle of the conversation, its height would soon become taller, just continuing to look at this would result in fainting, but they would disappear by saying "I've seen through you (見越したぞ)." They are said to appear with the look of a kind person, and when a person passing along talks to it, it would grow larger depending on the contents of the conversation.

In Icchōda, Amakusa District, Kumamoto Prefecture (now Amakusa), they are told in legends using the same pronunciation "mikoshi-nyūdō" but are written with different kanji, 御輿入道. It is said that they are a yōkai with a height of about five shaku (about 15 meters) that would appear on the road Geden no Kama, and to people who encounter them, it would lick around their lips as if it was licking them right then. A certain person encountered this, and when he prayed silently to god with all his mind, the nyūdō, without any fear of god, rode on a mikoshi-like object, and dragging out a long cloth, it flew away toward the mountain.

In the kibyōshi the "Bakemono Chakutōchō (夭怪着到牒)" by Masayoshi Kitao, it appears as ama-nyūdō (尼入道), a female yōkai that has deep hair and a long neck, and this has been determined to be a female version of the mikoshi-nyūdō (refer to image).

== Yōkai depictions ==
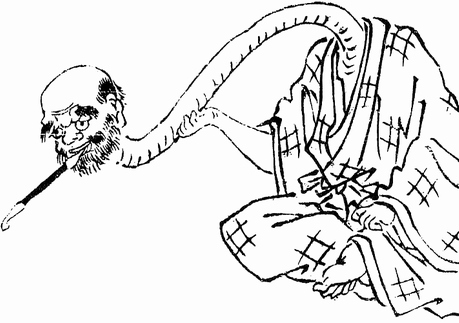
"Tanomiari Bakemono no Majiwari (信有奇怪会)" by Ikku Jippensha. An example of a long-necked mikoshi-nyūdō from kusazōshi.

Even while simply saying "mikoshi-nyūdō," they have been depicted as having various appearances in yōkai depictions. In the yōkai emaki, the "Hyakkai Zukan" from the Edo period (refer to image) as well as the yōkai sugoroku the "Mukashi-banashi Yōkai Sugoroku (百種怪談妖物双六)," only its face and upper body have been captured in the depiction, and are thus compositions that do not make clear what characteristics they have for their body. The mikoshi-nyūdō that has been depicted under the title "Mikoshi" in the Gazu Hyakki Yagyō by Sekien Toriyama (refer to image) is depicted covered by the shadow of a large tree, and its neck has become long, but since this is its appearance to people looking from behind, it does not mean that it is emphasizing the length of its neck like that of a rokurokubi.

While mikoshi-nyūdō depicted as a yōkai with giant characteristics exists, the mikoshi-nyūdō that brings to mind the long-necked rokurokubi depicted in play images in the Edo period are certainly not strange. There are those who think that they are related to the rokurokubi, and since the rokurokubi of legends are frequently female, they are sometimes pointed out as examples of male rokurokubi. The length of its neck has been exaggerated over the passage of eras, and in the late Edo period, it has become standard for its neck to be long and thin, and for its face to have three eyes. In many kusazōshi that had a theme on yōkai, they are also depicted as having a characteristic long neck, and from having an appearance with such impact, they almost always appear as the chief yōkai.

There is the opinion that these kinds of things give a glimpse on the varied and complicated influences that went into forming the world of yōkai.

== See also ==
- List of legendary creatures from Japan
- Rokurokubi
- Takaonna
