= Nyūdō-bōzu =

Yōkai

Nyūdō-bōzu (Japanese: 入道坊主) are yōkai first known in Tsukude, Minamishitara District, Aichi Prefecture (now Shinshiro), and then also in Fukushima Prefecture; Kurikoma, Kurihara District, Miyagi Prefecture (now Kurihara); Hirano, Suwa District, Nagano Prefecture (now Okaya), among other places.

== Legend ==
It is a yōkai that becomes larger the further one looks up, and is thus considered a type of mikoshi-nyūdō, which has the same characteristics. In Aichi Prefecture, it appears as a small bōzu that has a height that is not even 3 shaku (about 1 meter), but when people who meet them get close to it, it would then increase in height and become a large man about 7 or 8 shaku to 1 to (about 2 to 3 meters). It is said that by saying to it "I've seen it (見ていたぞ)," it is possible to make it disappear, but in reverse if it says something instead, it results in death.

In Fukushima Prefecture, it is said to be a weasel. When one looks up at a nyūdō-bōzu, it would gnaw at people's windpipes and kill them. It is said that since the weasel stomps on the shoulder of the person it is trying to fool, if one does not get startled and grasps that leg and stomps it on the ground, it would be possible to exterminate the nyūdō-bōzu. In Nagano Prefecture, it is said that their true form is considered to be a tanuki or mujina, and in Miyagi Prefecture, a mujina.

== See also ==
- List of legendary creatures from Japan
