= Miage-nyūdō =

Japanese yōkai

Miage-nyūdō is a type of yōkai told about on Sado Island (Sado, Niigata Prefecture). They are a type of mikoshi-nyūdō.

== Mythology ==
When climbing a small slope at night, something taking on the appearance of a little bōzu would appear in front, and by looking up, it would become taller, and the person looking at it would fall down backwards. It is said that by chanting "miage-nyūdō, I've seen past you (見上入道、見越した)" and lying down forwards, it would disappear. In Hamochi, Sado District (now a part of Sado), it is said that the miage-nyūdō that appears at a place called Tsujidō would steal food and money from travelers.

In Utami, Ryōtsu (now a part of Sado), it is said that they are in places where trees grow thickly and is dim even at noon, and that a large stone called the "miage-ishi (見上石, look up stone)" has shapeshifted into a nyūdō. Once, a traveler met this, and by chanting "miage-nyūdō, I've seen past you" and striking it with a rod, the nyūdō disappeared. It is said that afterwards, when a jizō was deified above the rock, the nyūdō no longer appeared.

Also, in a legend of Akadomari (now a part of Sado), Sado District, there was a miage-nyūdō that squashed and killed night travelers, but it once accidentally fell to the bottom of a ravine, and since it was helped by someone under the condition that it would "no longer attack people" and to "stay away from that place," it no longer appeared there, and it is said that this ravine started to be called the "nyūdō marsh".

In Hatano, Sado District (now a part of Sado), it is said that when those who meet a miage-nyūdō say, "the miage-nyūdō I saw before was much larger" and thus challenge it, and since its feet would thus become thinner, a violent sound would result, and the miage-nyūdō would fall down.

== Appearance in media ==
In GeGeGe no Kitaro, it appeared taking on the appearance of the yōkai, the aobōzu appeared, but they are completely unrelated.

In chapter 6 of Mahoutsukai no Yoru, Shizuki jokingly refers to a large Aoko that appears in his dream as a miage nyudo.

== See also ==
- List of legendary creatures from Japan
