= Gazu Hyakki Tsurezure Bukuro =

Fourth book of the Gazu Hyakki Yagyō tetralogy

Hyakki Tsurezure Bukuro (百器徒然袋; "The Illustrated Bag of One Hundred Random Demons" or "A Horde of Haunted Housewares") is the fourth book in Japanese artist Toriyama Sekien's famous Gazu Hyakki Yagyō tetralogy. A version of the tetralogy translated and annotated in English was published in 2016. The title is a pun; "hyakki", normally written with the characters "hundred" and "oni", is instead written with "hundred" and "vessels". This hints that the majority of the yōkai portrayed in its pages are of the variety known as tsukumogami, man-made objects taken sentient form. Hyakki Tsurezure Bukuro is preceded in the series by Gazu Hyakki Yagyō, Konjaku Gazu Zoku Hyakki, and Konjaku Hyakki Shūi.

Published in 1781, it was inspired in part by Tsurezuregusa (Tales in Idleness), a 14th-century essay collection by the monk Yoshida Kenkō. The book takes the form of a supernatural bestiary of yōkai. Unlike previous books in the series, the majority of Hyakki Tsurezure Bukuro's yōkai appear to be of Sekien's own creation, based on turns of phrase or stories from Tsurezuregusa and other works of literature. Also unlike the other books in the series, Hyakki Tsurezure Bukuro has a rudimentary narrative framework, described as the record of a strange dream in early printings (the third printing omits this introduction).

The book is compiled in three sub-volumes: Jō, Chū, and Ge (literally "top", "middle", and "bottom", but generally translated as first, second, and third volume in English.) The imagery below is from the third printing of the book.

== List of creatures ==
=== First Volume ===
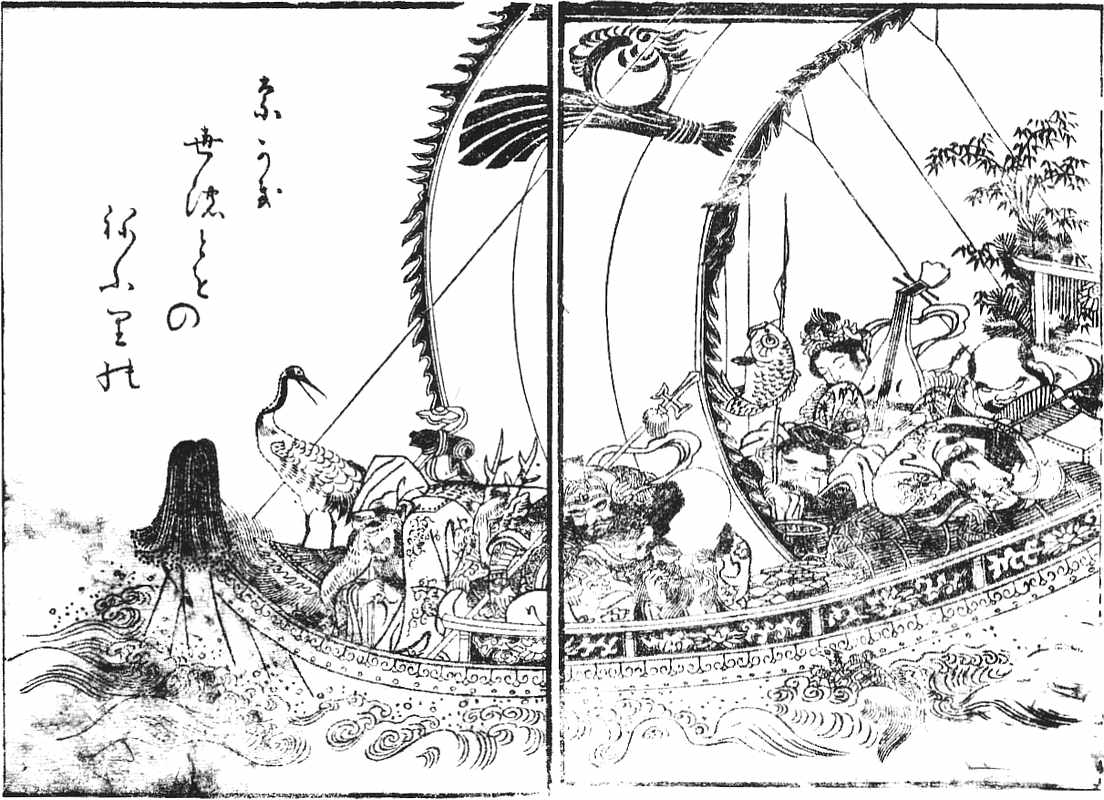
Takarabune (ja:宝船)

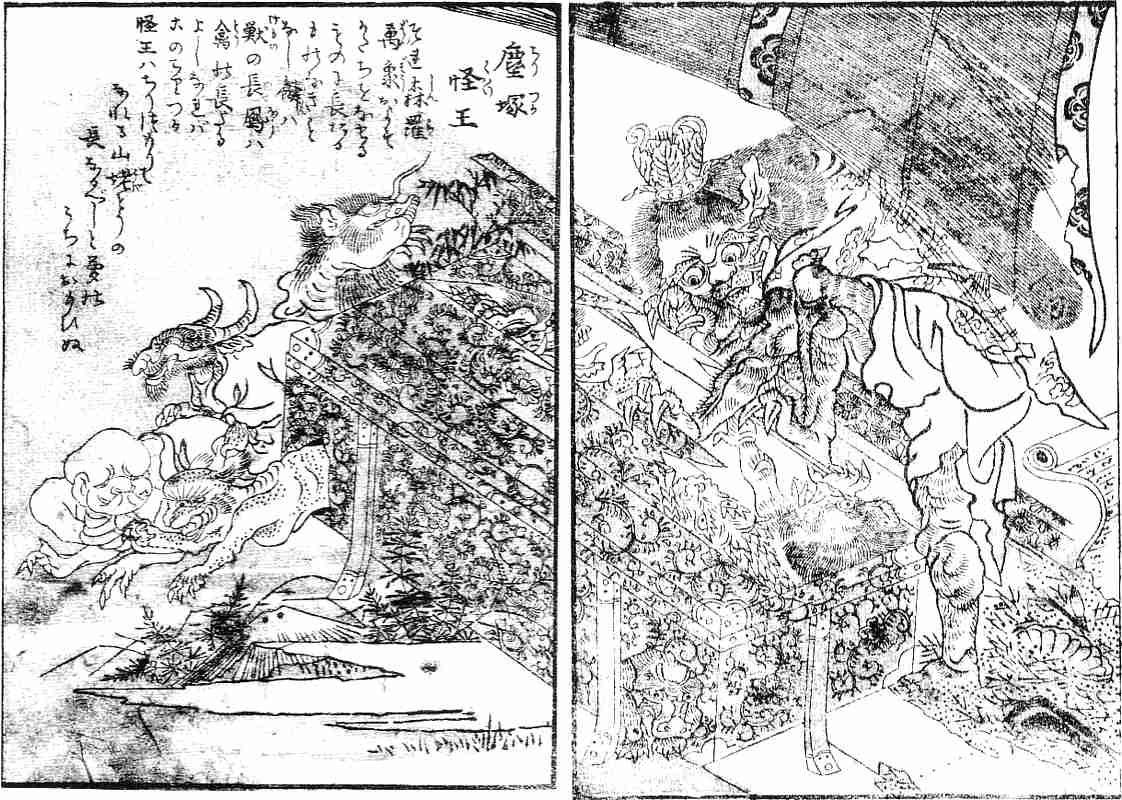
Chirizu-kakai-ō (ja:塵塚怪王)

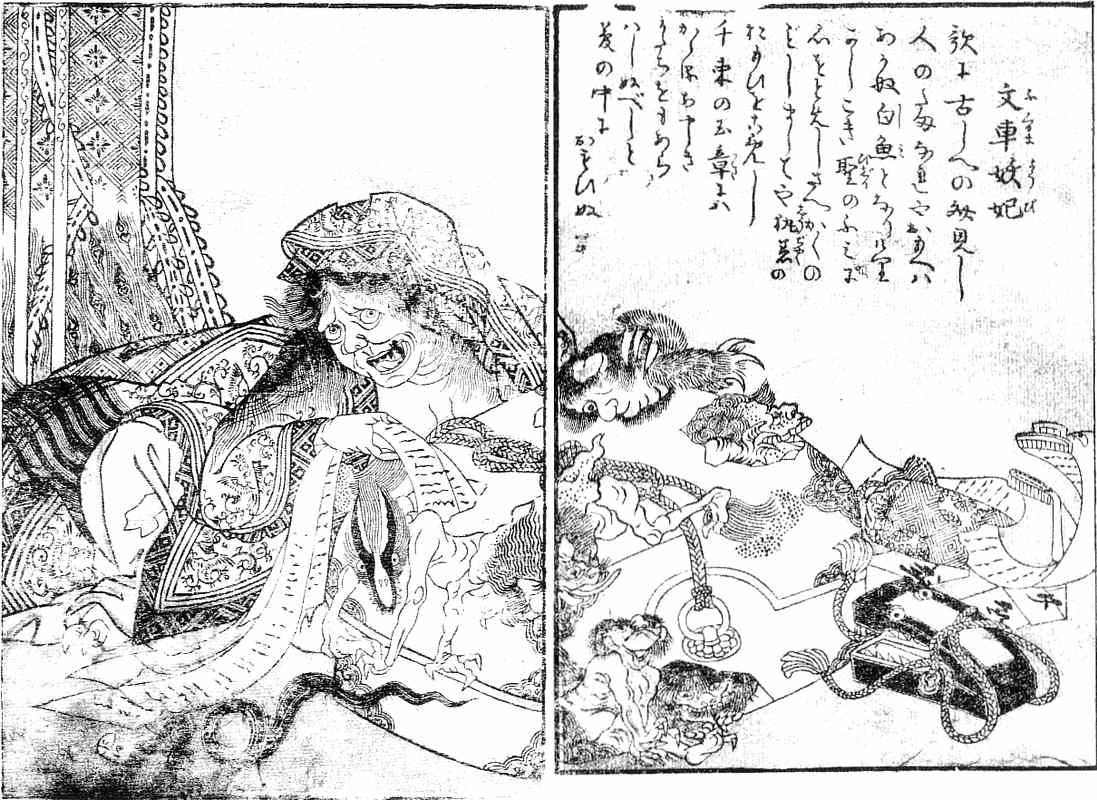
Fuguruma-yōki (ja:文車妖妃)

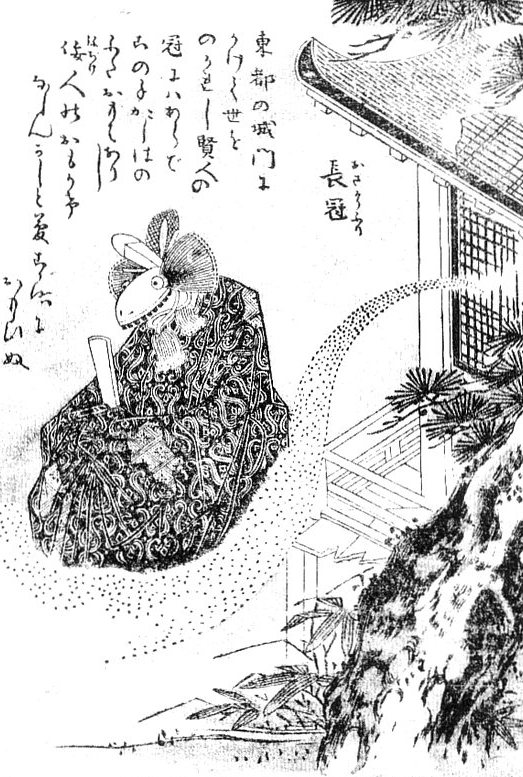
Osakōburi (ja:長冠)

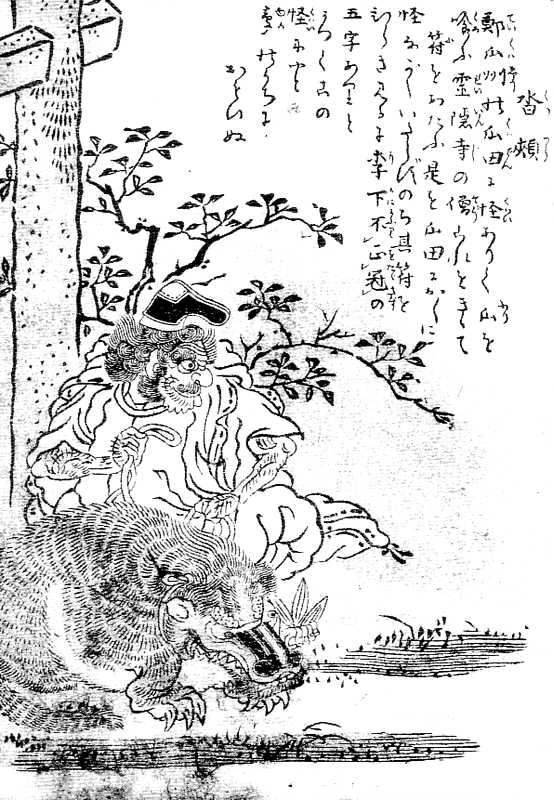
Kutsutsura (ja:沓頬)

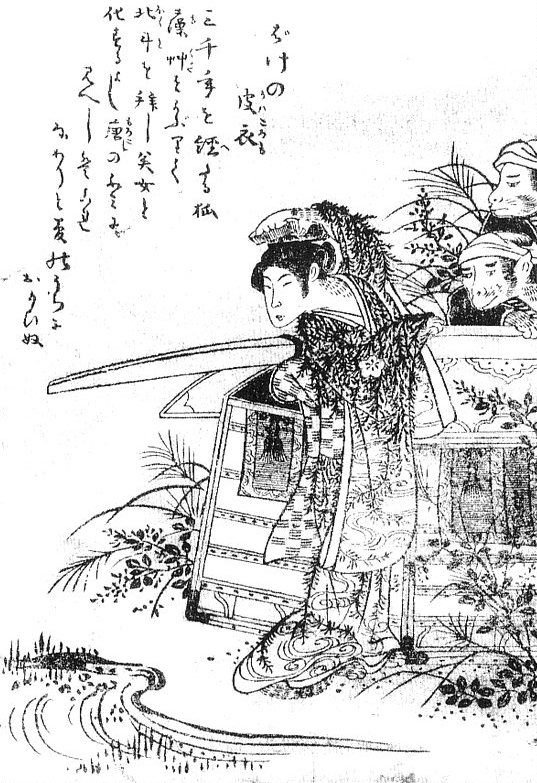
Bake-no-Kawagoromo (化けの皮衣)

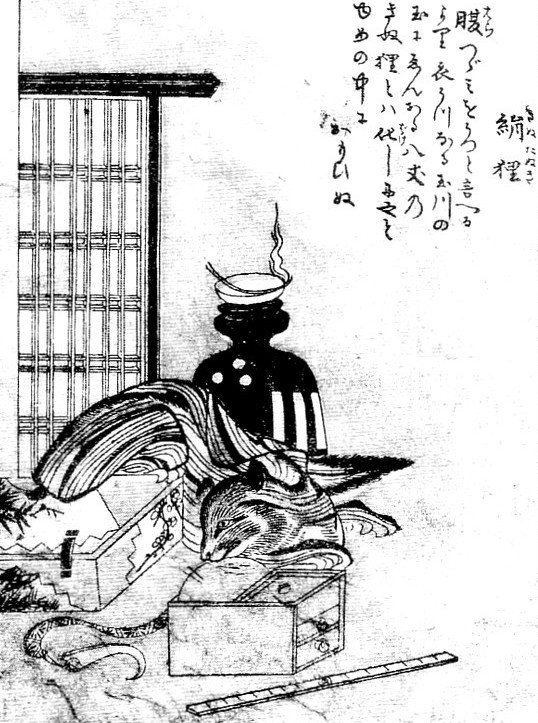
Kinutanuki (ja:絹狸)

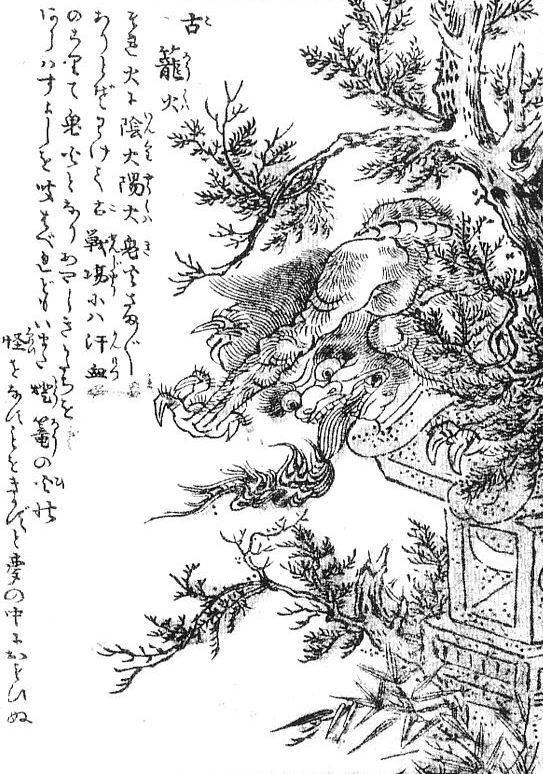
Korōka (ja:古籠火)

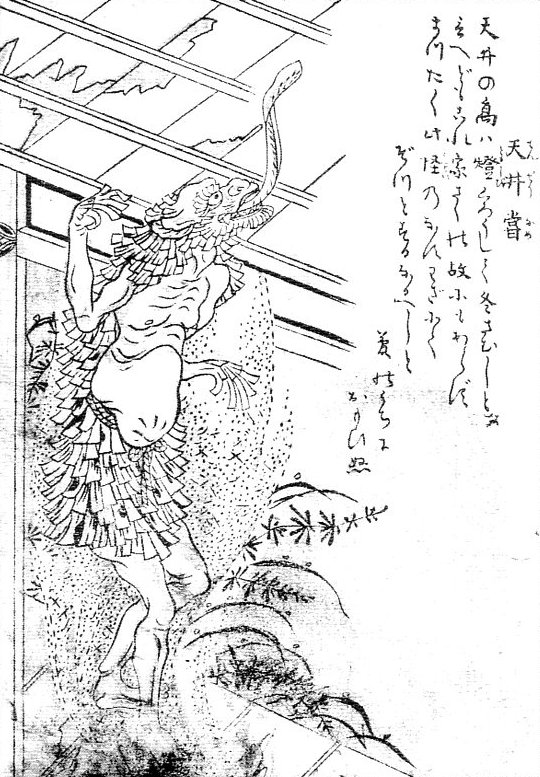
Tenjōname (ja:天井嘗)

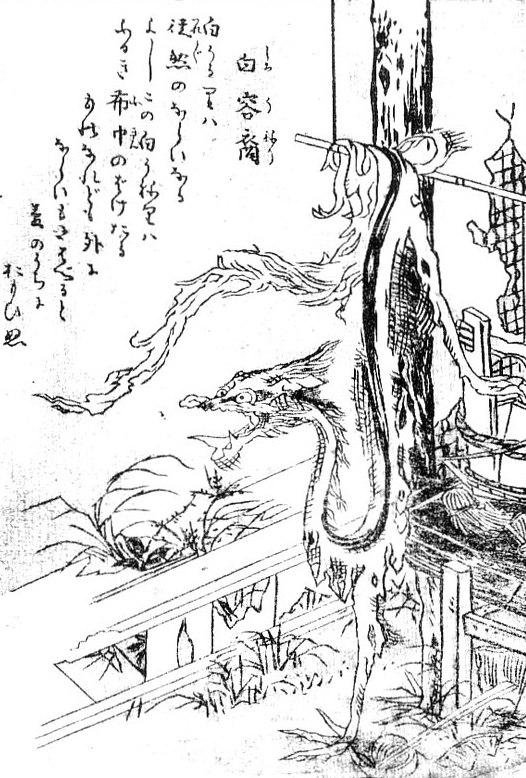
Shirouneri (ja:白溶裔)

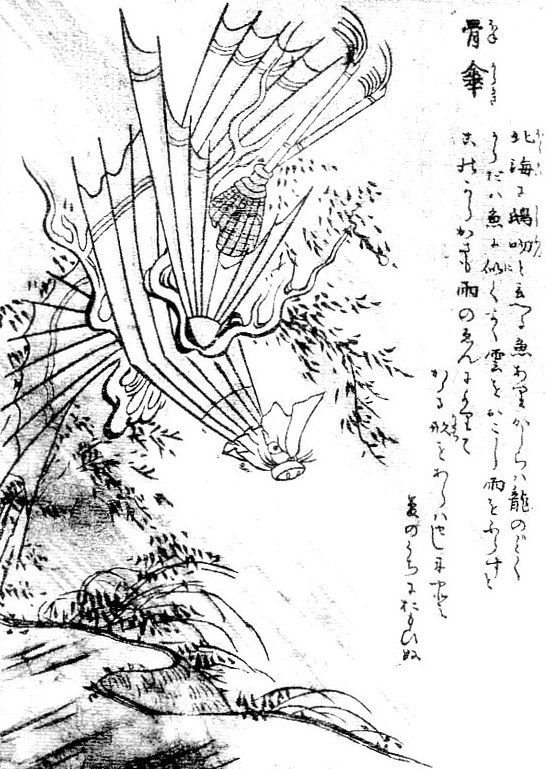
Honekarakasa (ja:骨傘)

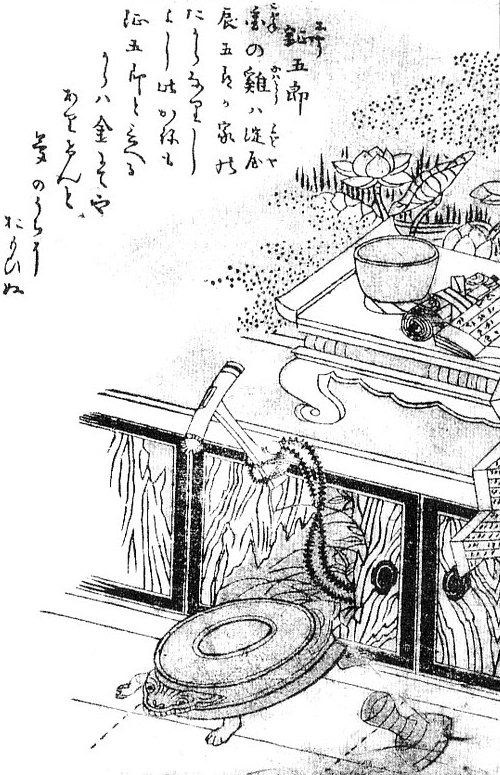
Shōgorō (ja:鉦五郎)

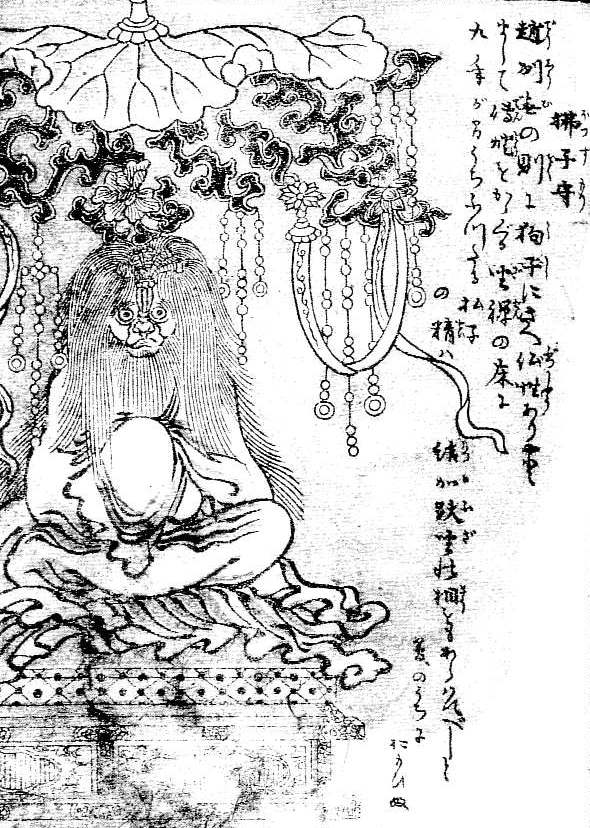
Hossumori (払子守)

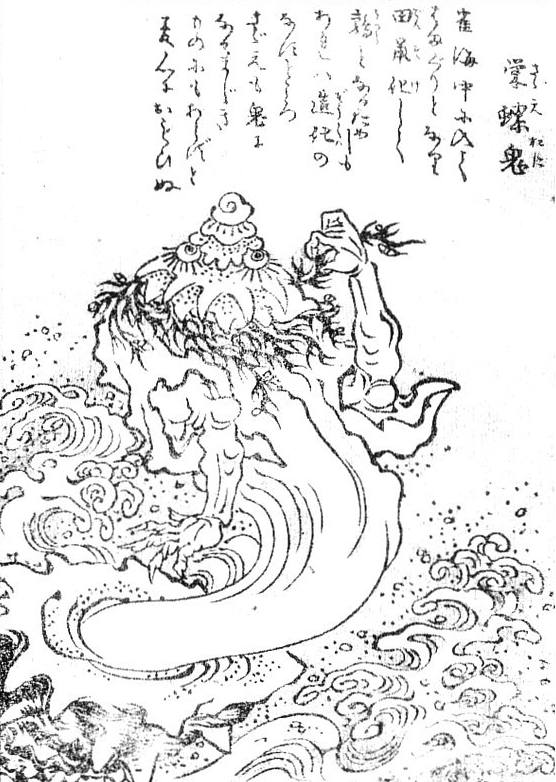
Sazaeoni (ja:栄螺鬼)

=== Second Volume ===
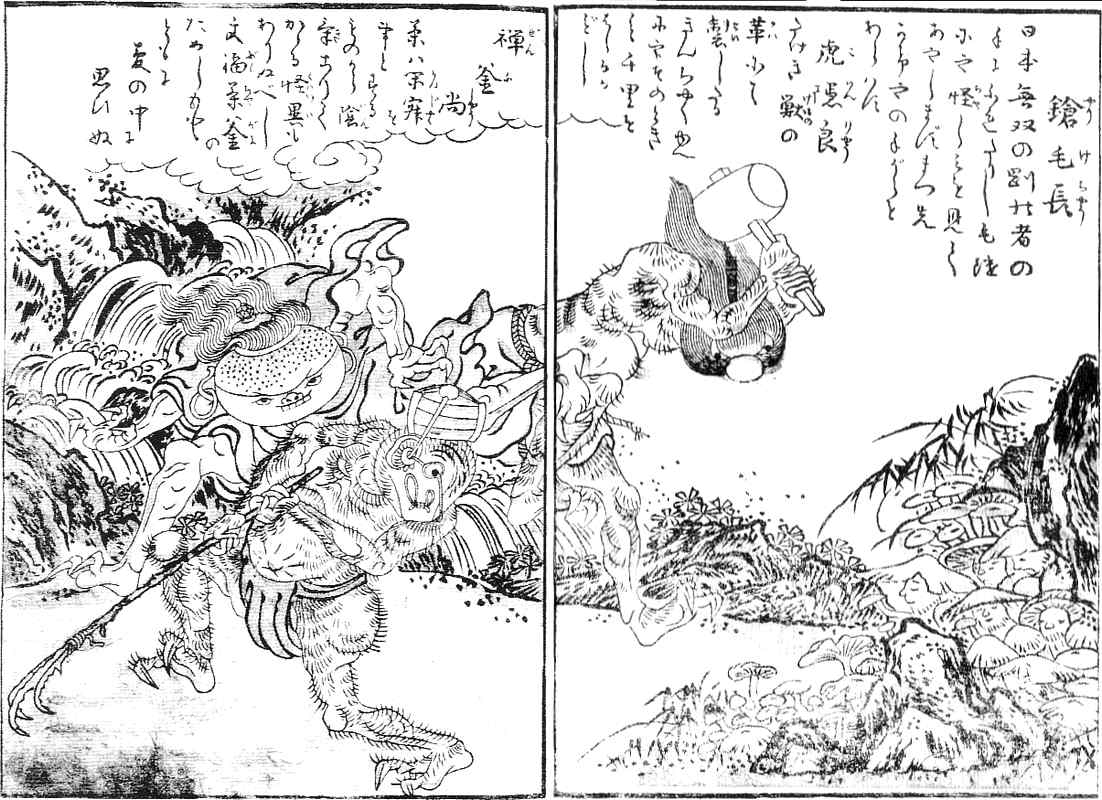
Yarikechō (ja:槍毛長), Koinryō (ja:虎隠良), and Zenfushō (ja:禅釜尚) Zenfushō is a teakettle tsukumogami which holds a clawed staff called koinryō. It is pictured alongside monsters called Yarikechō and Koinryō.

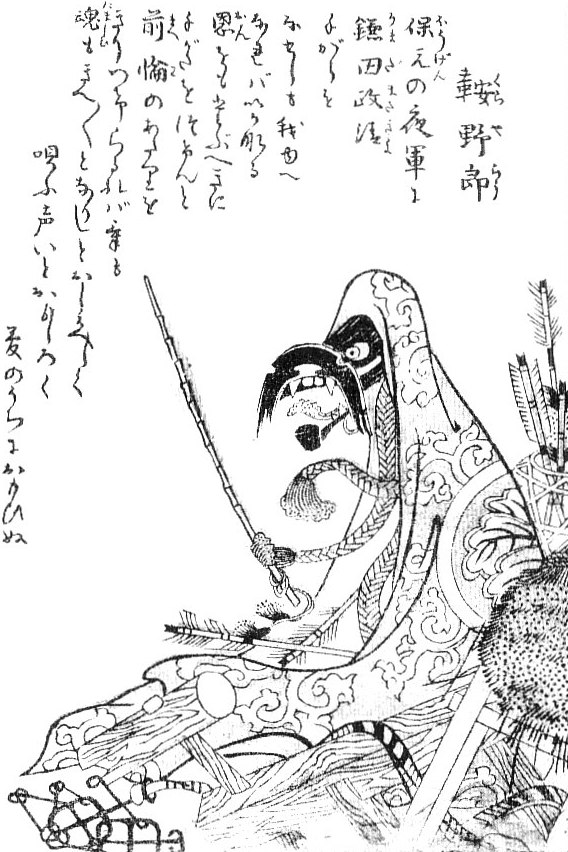
Kurayarō (ja:鞍野郎)

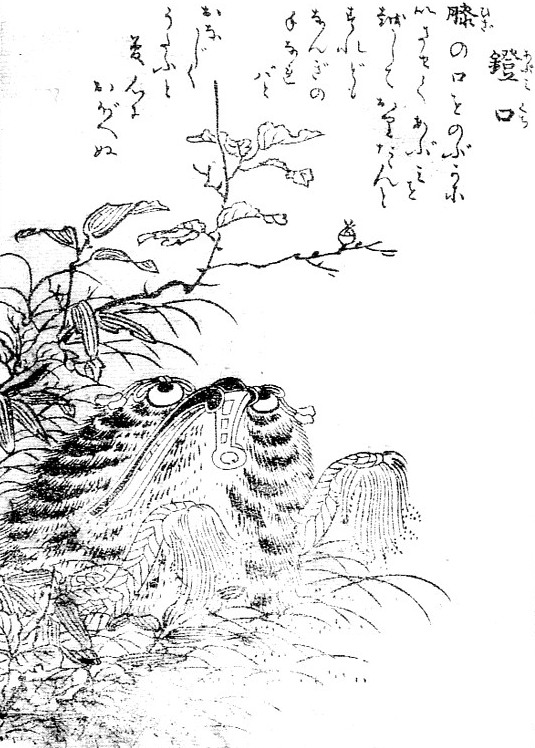
Abumi-guchi (ja:鐙口)

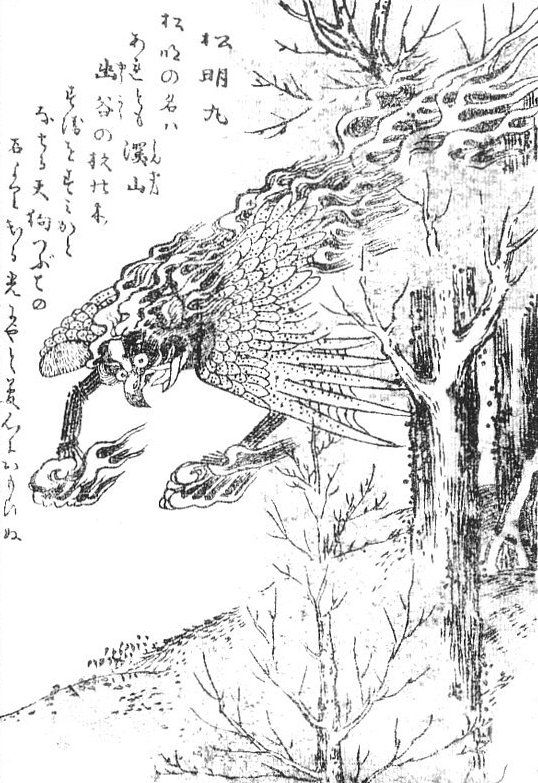
Taimatsumaru (ja:松明丸)

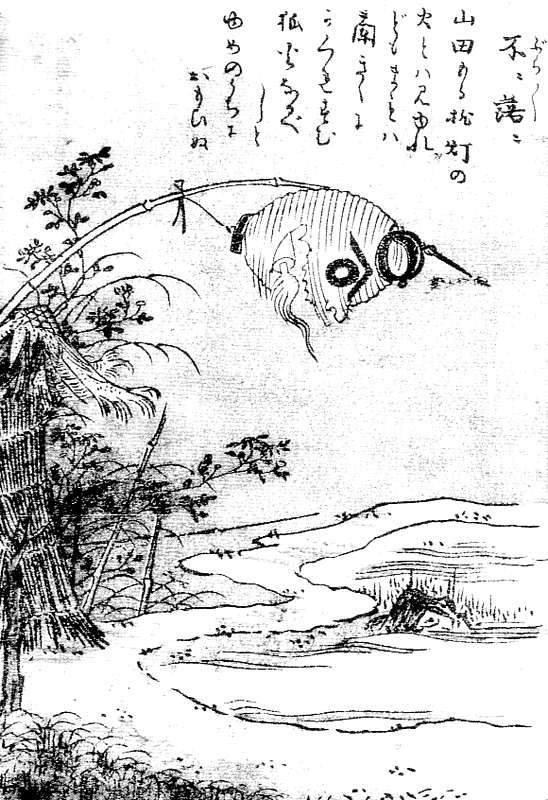
Burabura (不々落々)

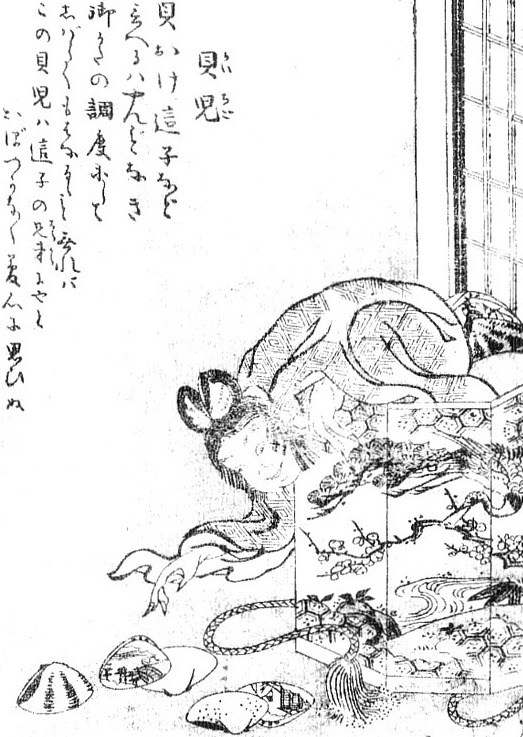
Kaichigo (ja:貝児)

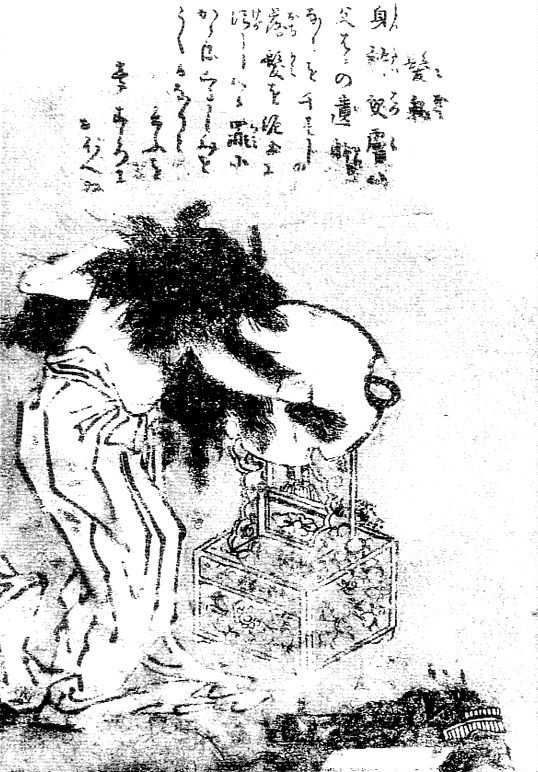
Kami-oni (ja:髪鬼)

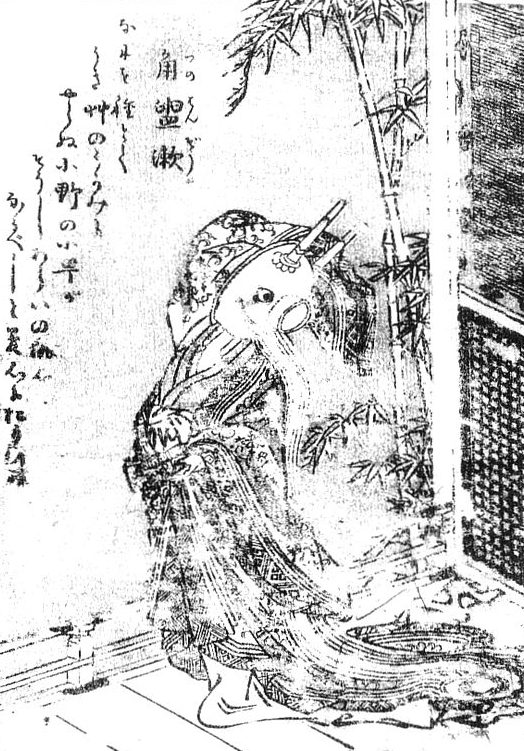
Tsunohanzō (ja:角盥漱)

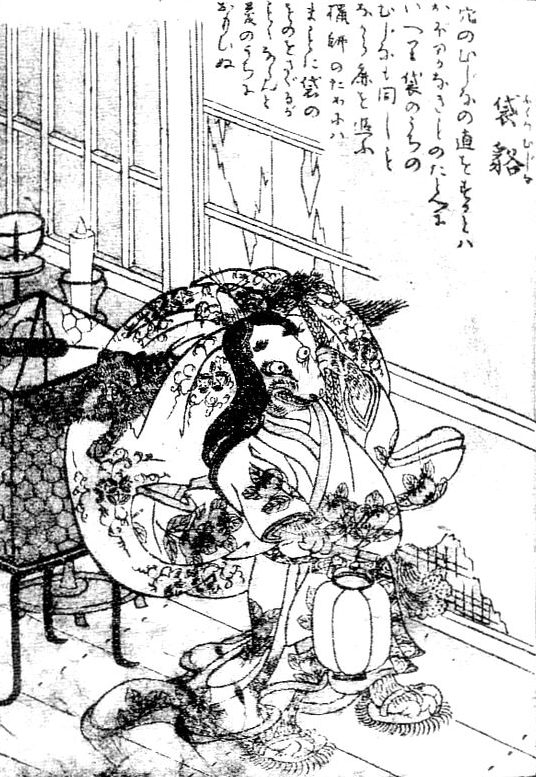
Fukuromujina (ja:袋貉)

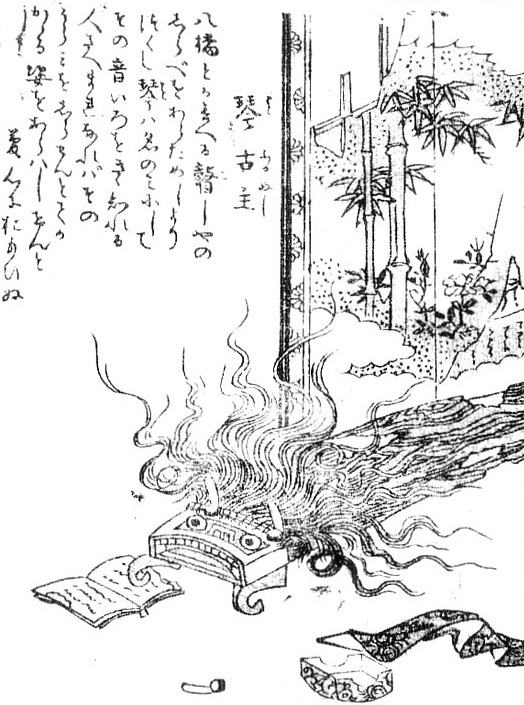
Koto-furunushi (ja:琴古主)

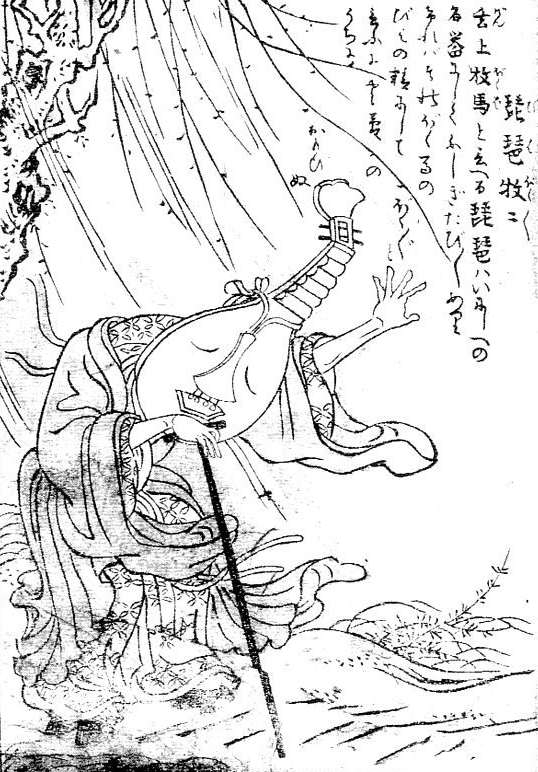
Biwa-bokuboku (ja:琵琶牧々)

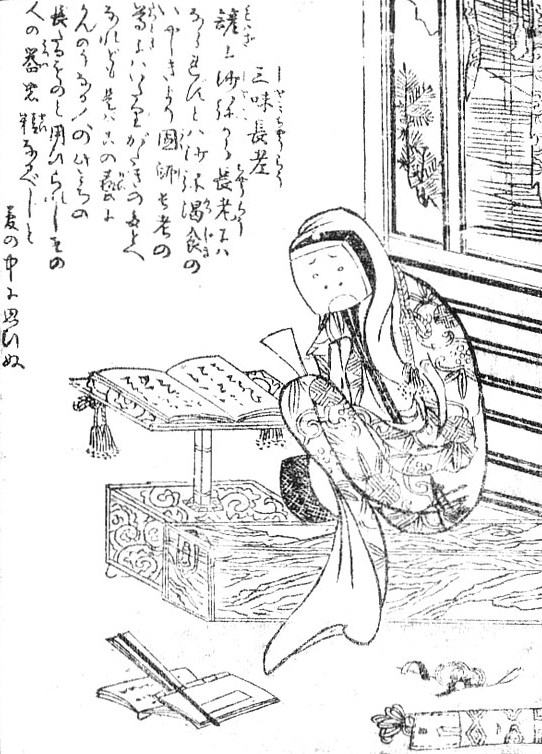
Shamichōrō (ja:三味長老)

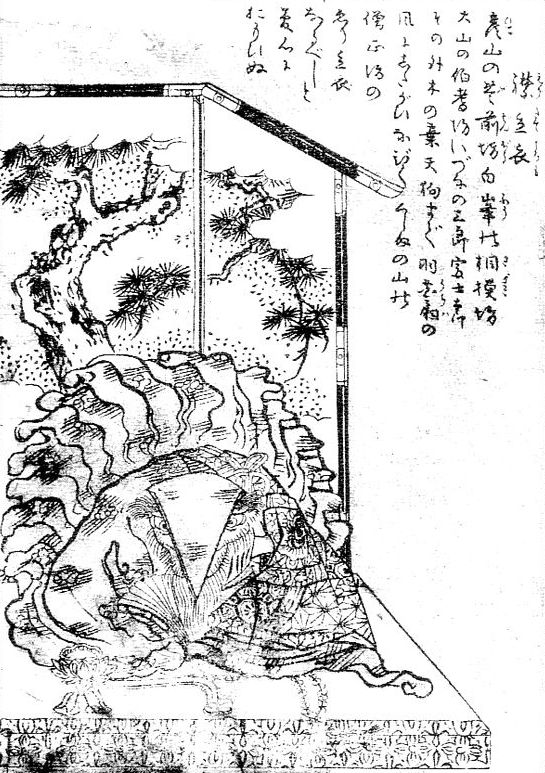
Eritategoromo (ja:襟立衣)

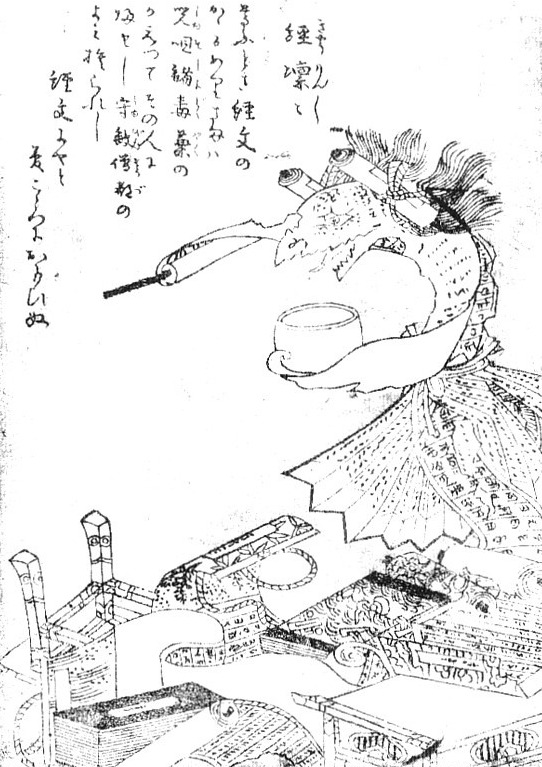
Kyōrinrin (ja:経凛々)

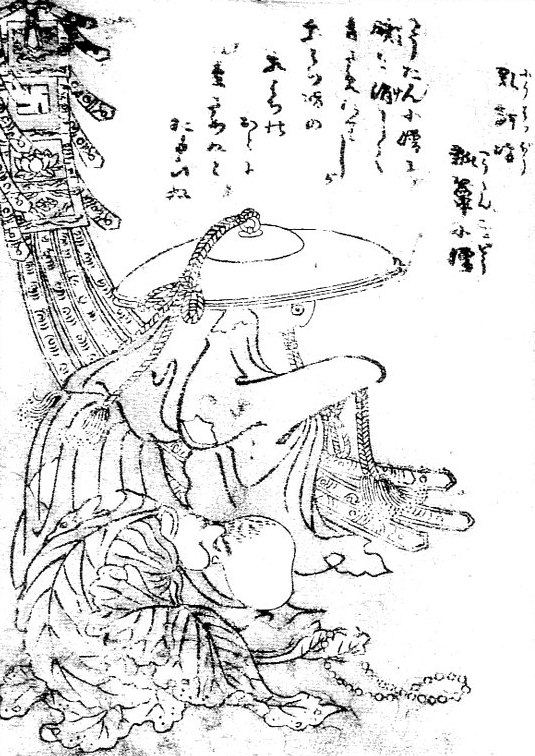
Nyūbachibō (ja:乳鉢坊) and Hyōtankozō (ja:瓢箪小僧)

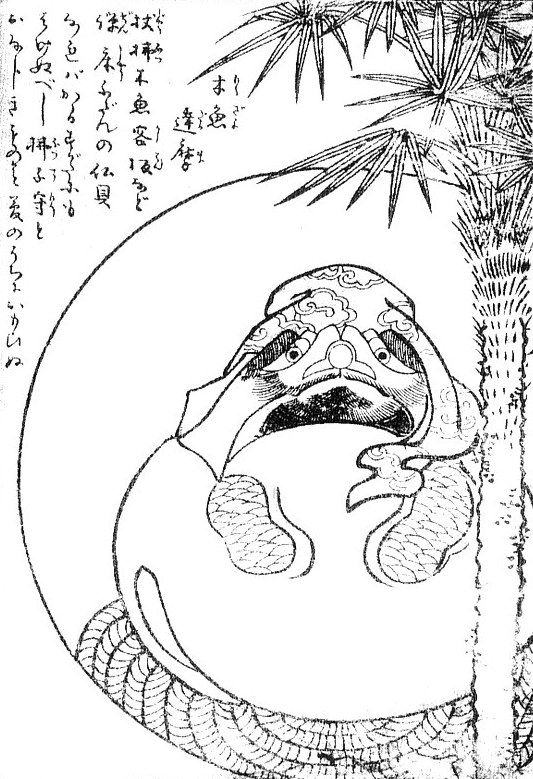
Mokugyodaruma (ja:木魚達磨)

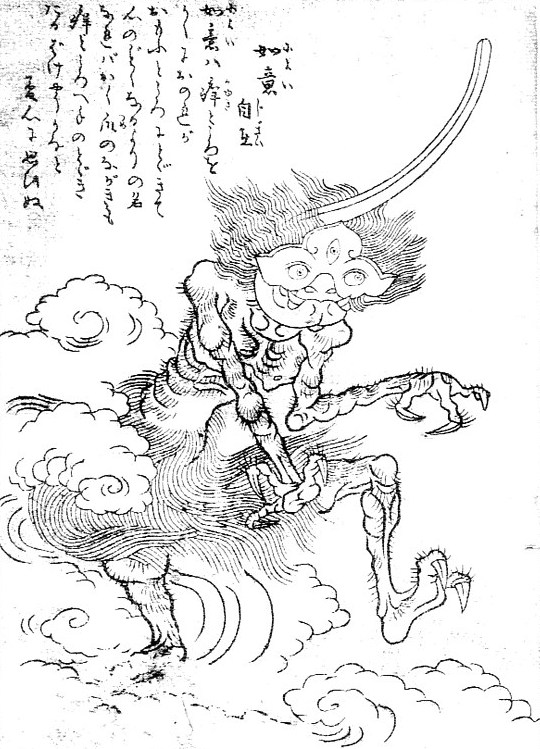
Nyoijizai (ja:如意自在)

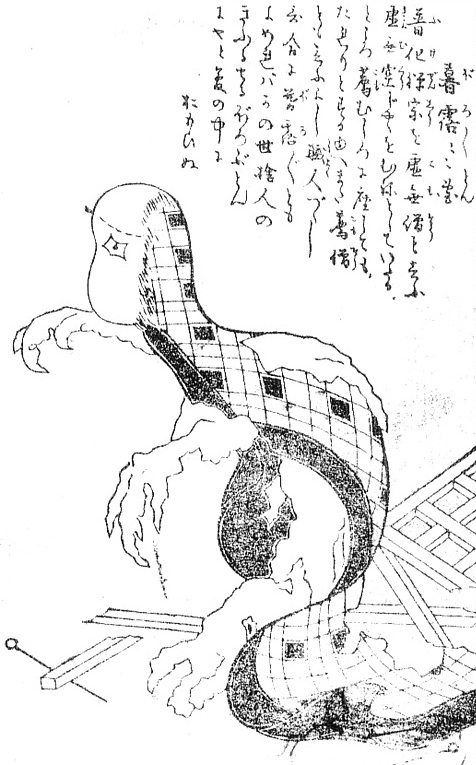
Boroboroton (暮露々々団)

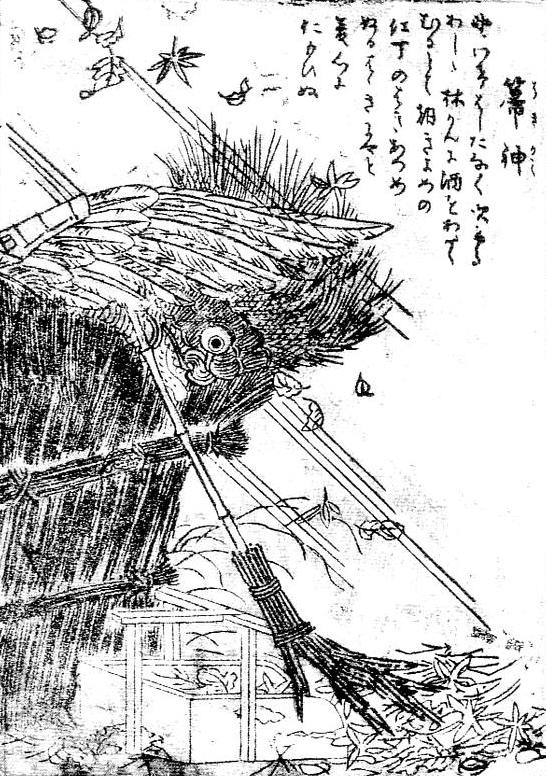
Hahakigami (箒神)

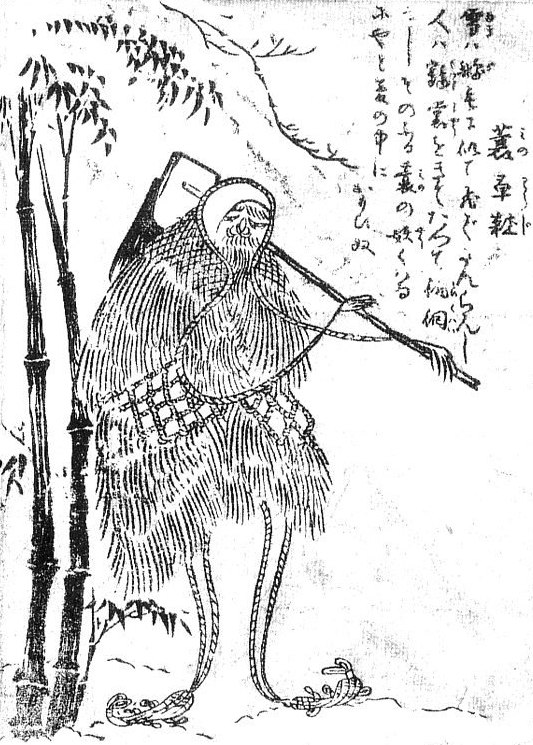
Minowaraji (ja:蓑草鞋)

=== Third Volume ===
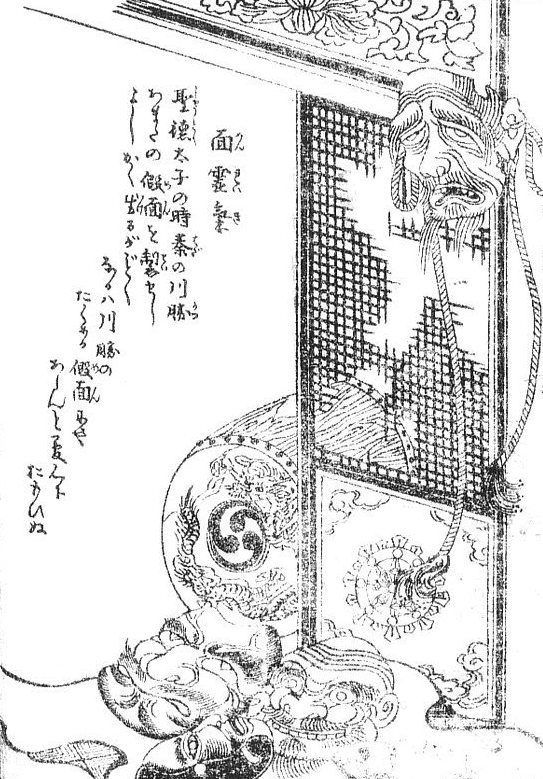
Menreiki (ja:面霊気)

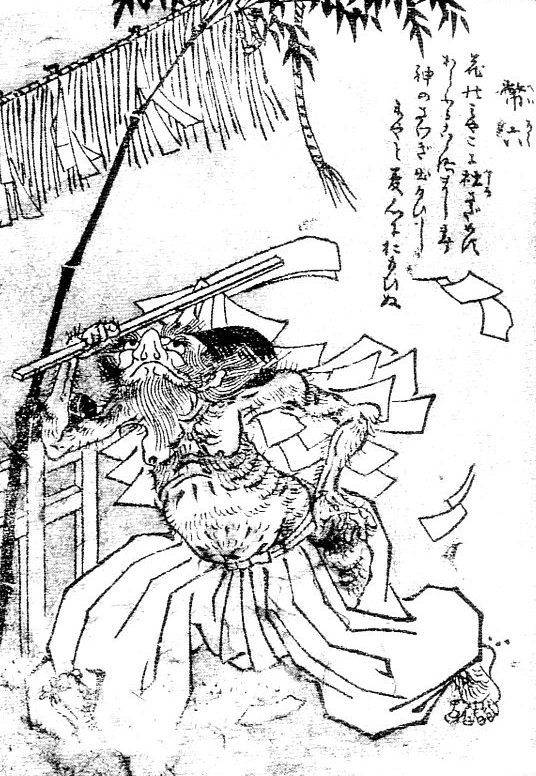
Heiroku (ja:幣六)

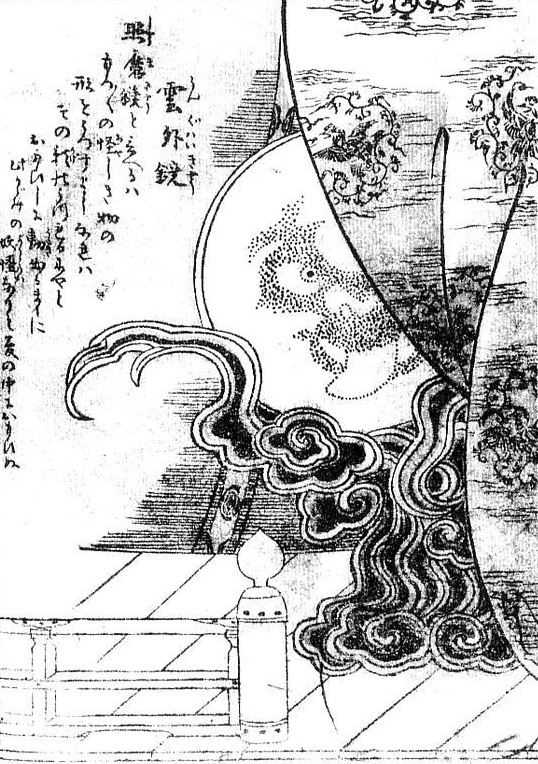
Ungaikyō (ja:雲外鏡)

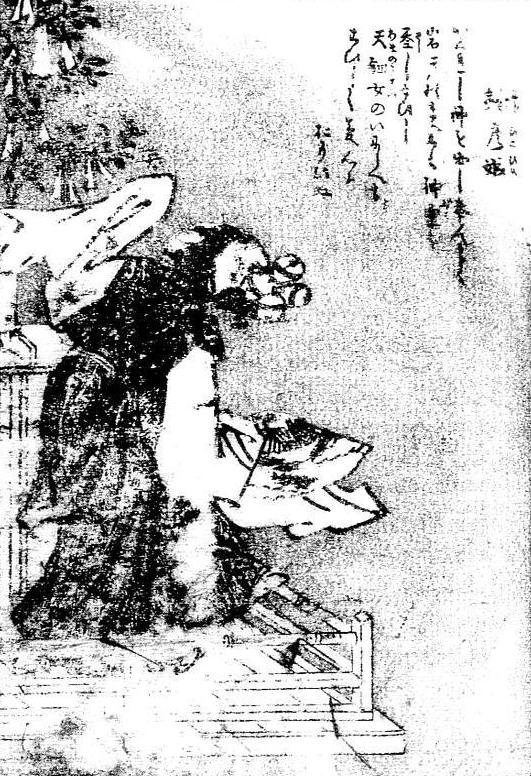
Suzuhikohime (ja:鈴彦姫, Princess Suzuhiko)

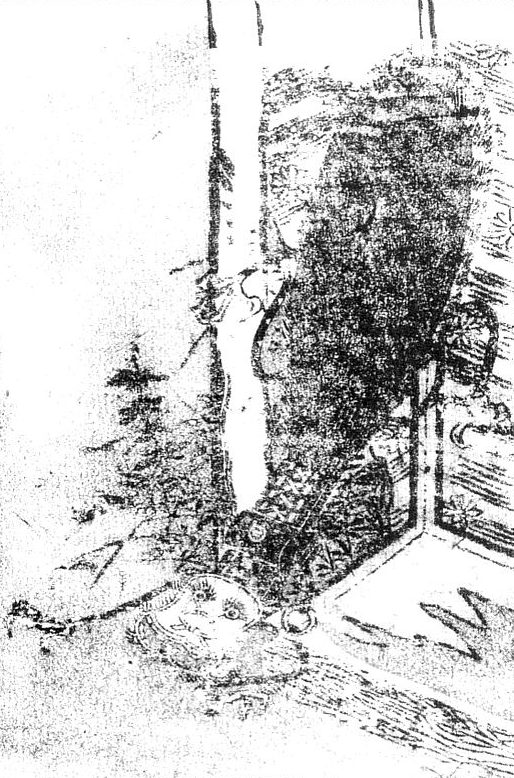
Furu-utsubo (ja:古空穂)

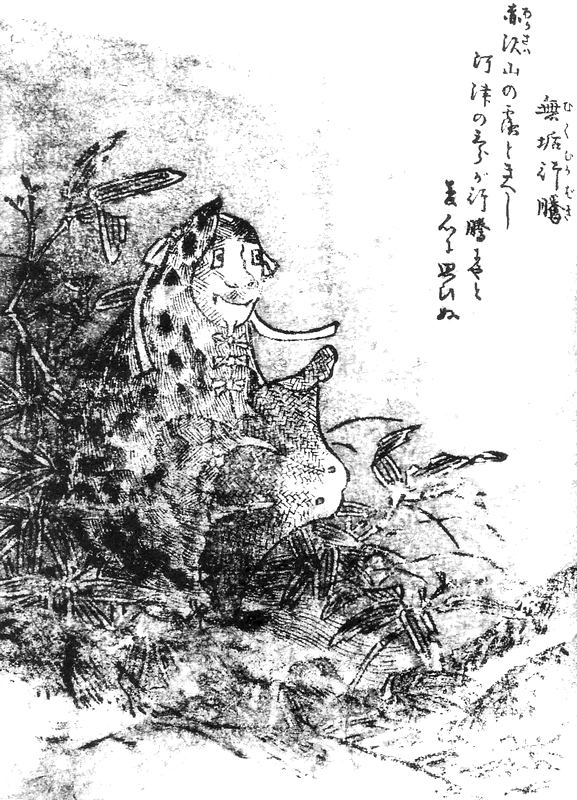
Mukumukabaki (無垢行騰)

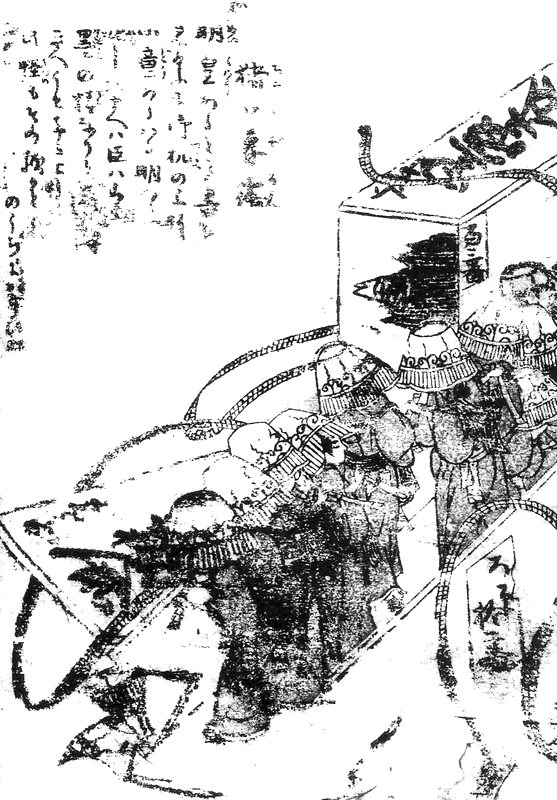
Chokuboron (ja:猪口暮露)

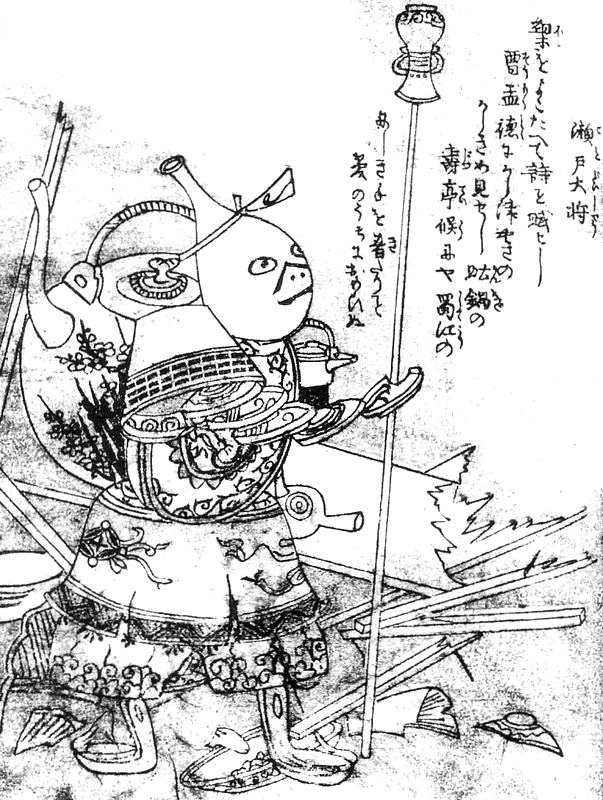
Setodaishō (ja:瀬戸大将)

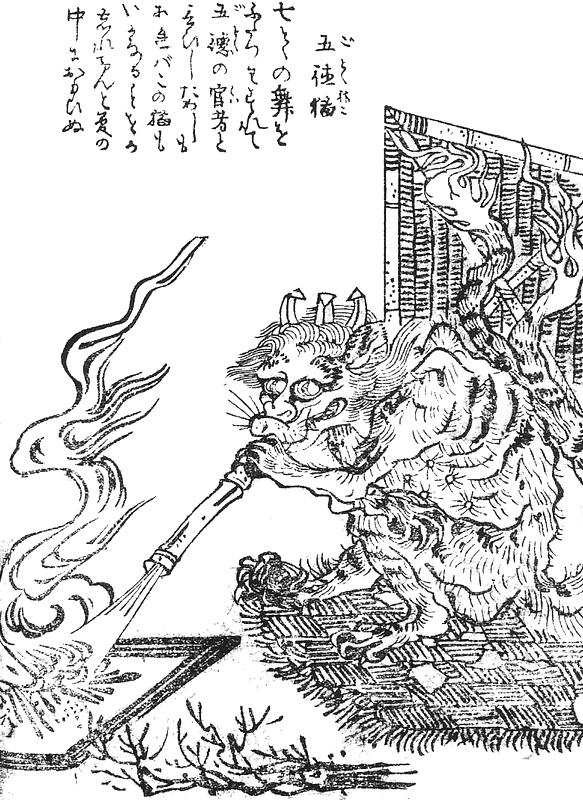
Gotokuneko (ja:五徳猫)

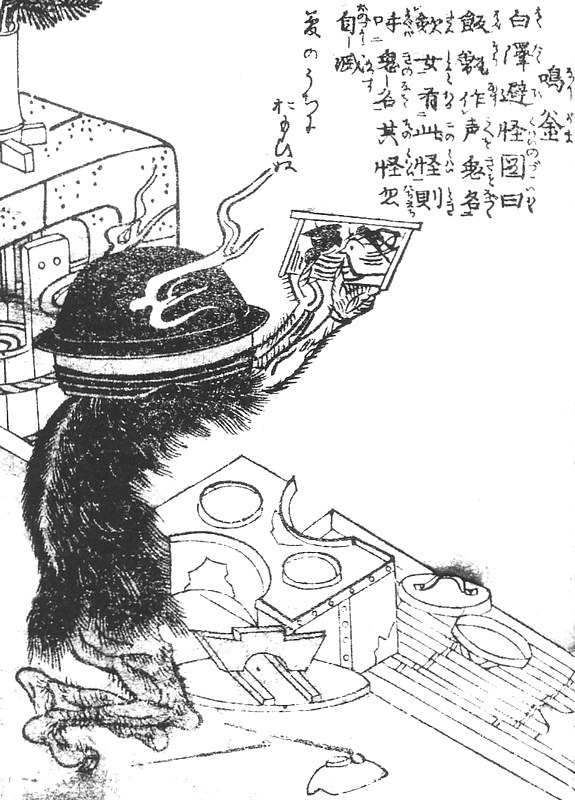
Narigama (ja:鳴釜)

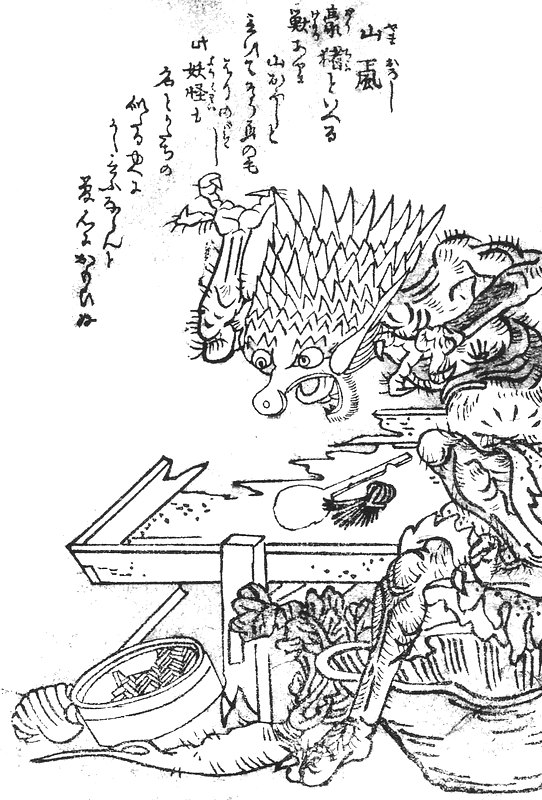
Yamaoroshi (山颪)

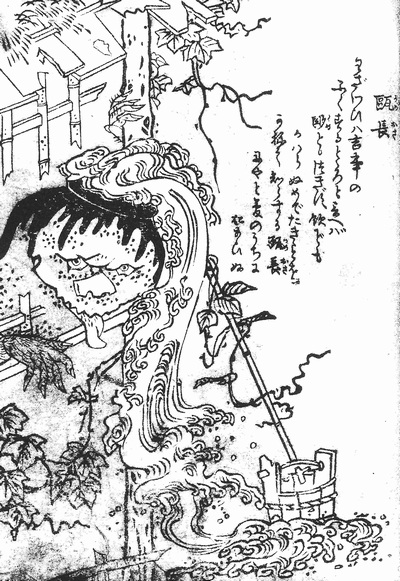
Kameosa (ja:甕長)

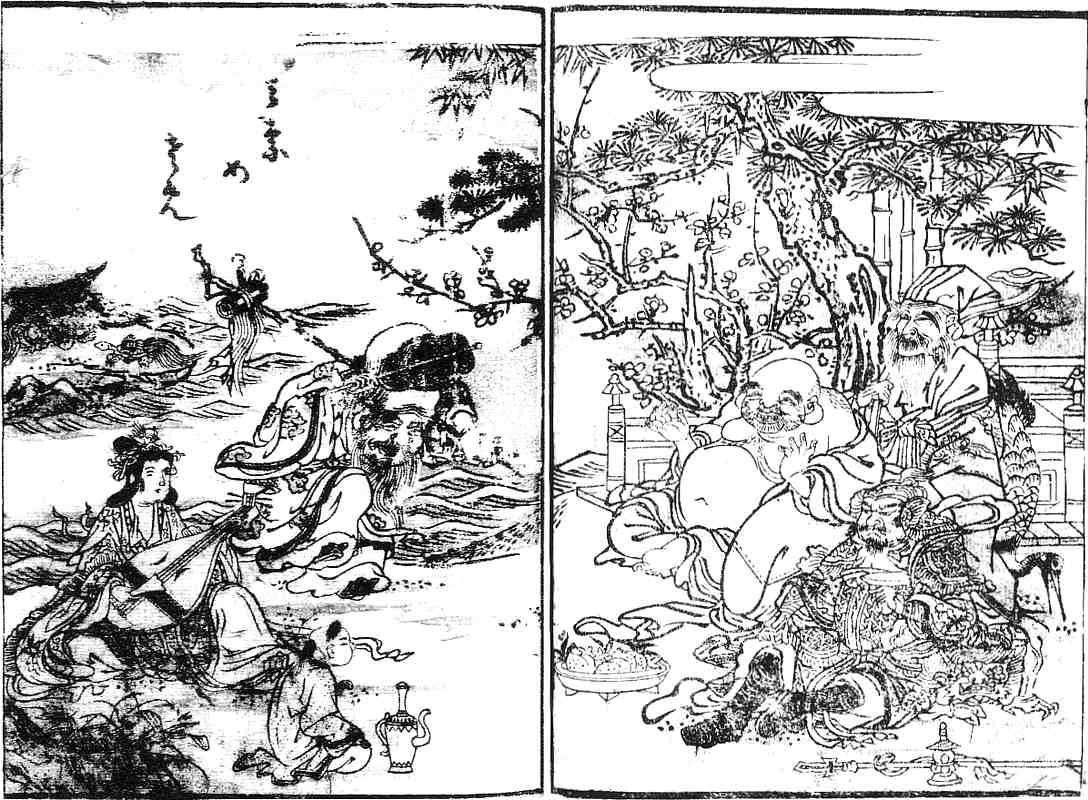
Takarabune (宝船)

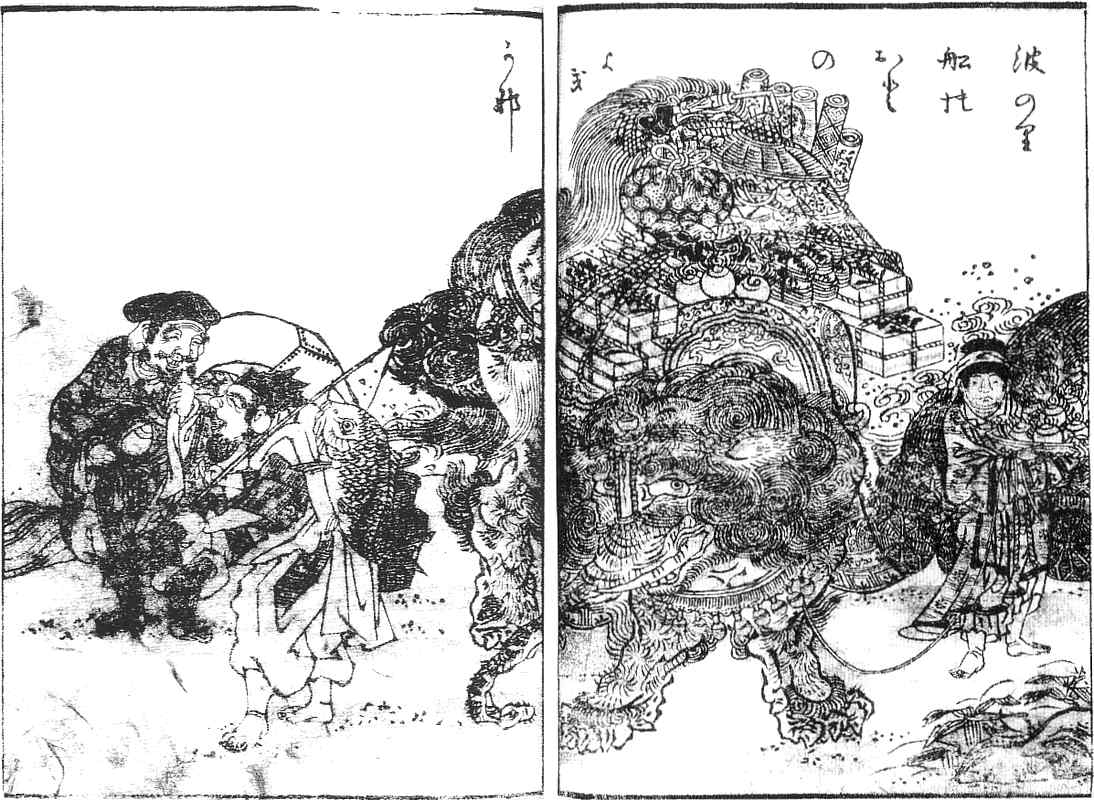
Takarabune (宝船)

== See also ==
- Gazu Hyakki Yagyō
- Konjaku Gazu Zoku Hyakki
- Konjaku Hyakki Shūi

== Bibliography ==
- "Hyakki Tsurezure Bukuro (3rd Edition), National Diet Library of Japan".
