= Tsukumogami =

Japanese yokai

In Japanese folklore, tsukumogami (付喪神 or つくも神, (Note: Komatsu Kazuhiko, in the book "器物の妖怪 - 付喪神をめぐって" [Yokai of Vessels and Tools: Concerning Tsukumogami]. 憑霊信仰論 [Theory of Spirit Possession Beliefs]. Kodansha Gakujutsu Bunko (in Japanese). Kodansha. 1994. pp. 326–342. ISBN 4-06-159115-0. used the word "Tsukugami" widely to include any yōkai, including animals, from the Edo period and before that originally came from tools.) lit. "tool kami") are tools that have acquired a kami or spirit. According to an annotated version of The Tales of Ise titled Ise Monogatari Shō, there is a theory originally from the Onmyōki (陰陽記) that foxes and tanuki, among other beings, that have lived for at least a hundred years and changed forms are considered tsukumogami. In modern times, the term can also be written 九十九神 (literally ninety-nine kami), to emphasize the agedness.

According to Komatsu Kazuhiko, the idea of a tsukumogami or a yōkai of tools spread mostly in the Japanese Middle Ages and declined in more recent generations. Komatsu infers that despite the depictions in Bakumatsu period ukiyo-e art leading to a resurfacing of the idea, these were all produced in an era cut off from any actual belief in the idea of tsukumogami.

Because the term has been applied to several different concepts in Japanese folklore, there remains some confusion as to what the term actually means. Today, the term is generally understood to be applied to virtually any object "that has reached its 100th birthday and thus become alive and self-aware", though this definition is not without controversy.

== History and etymology ==
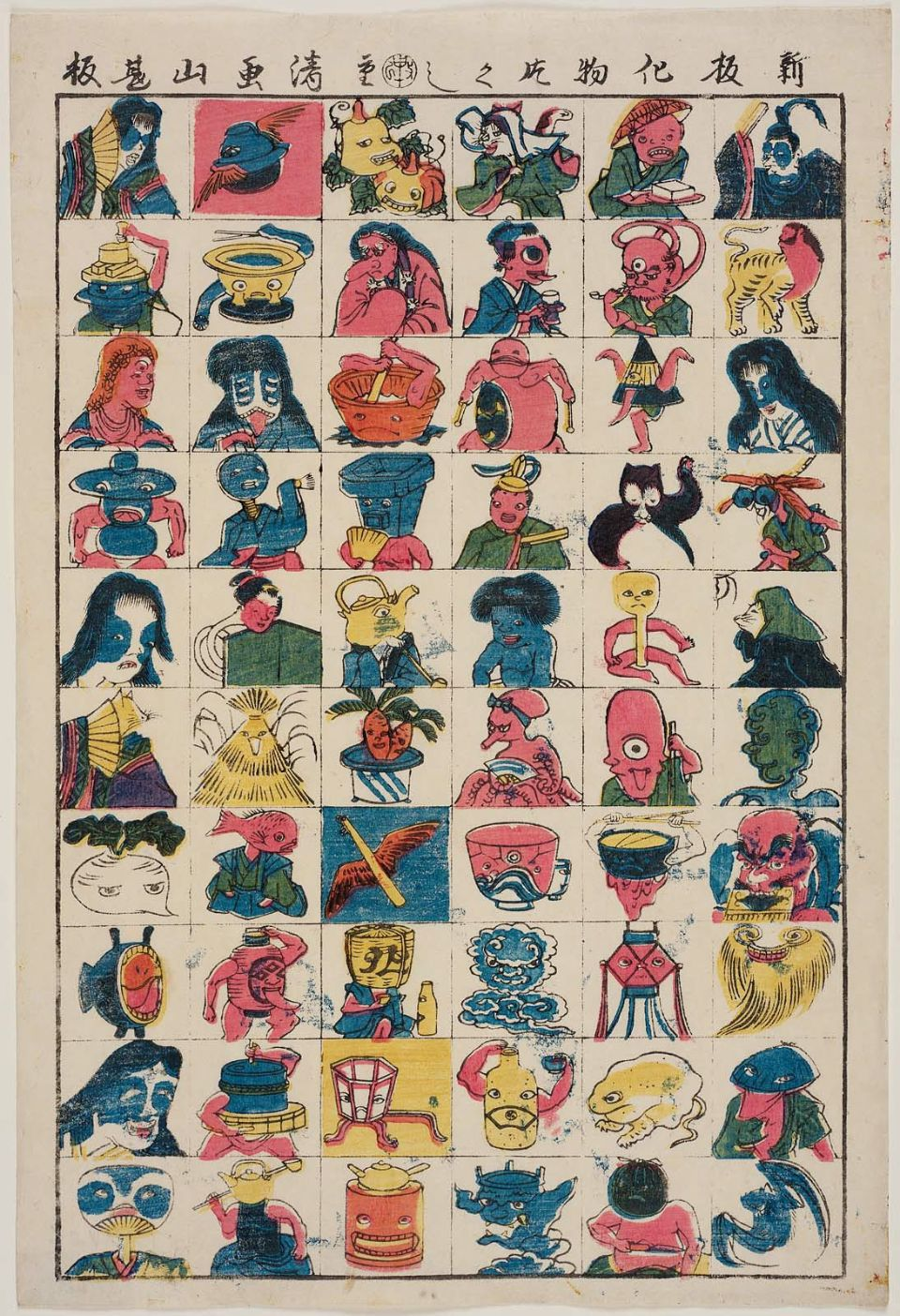
Woodblock print, A New Collection of Monsters 新板化物つくし, 1860

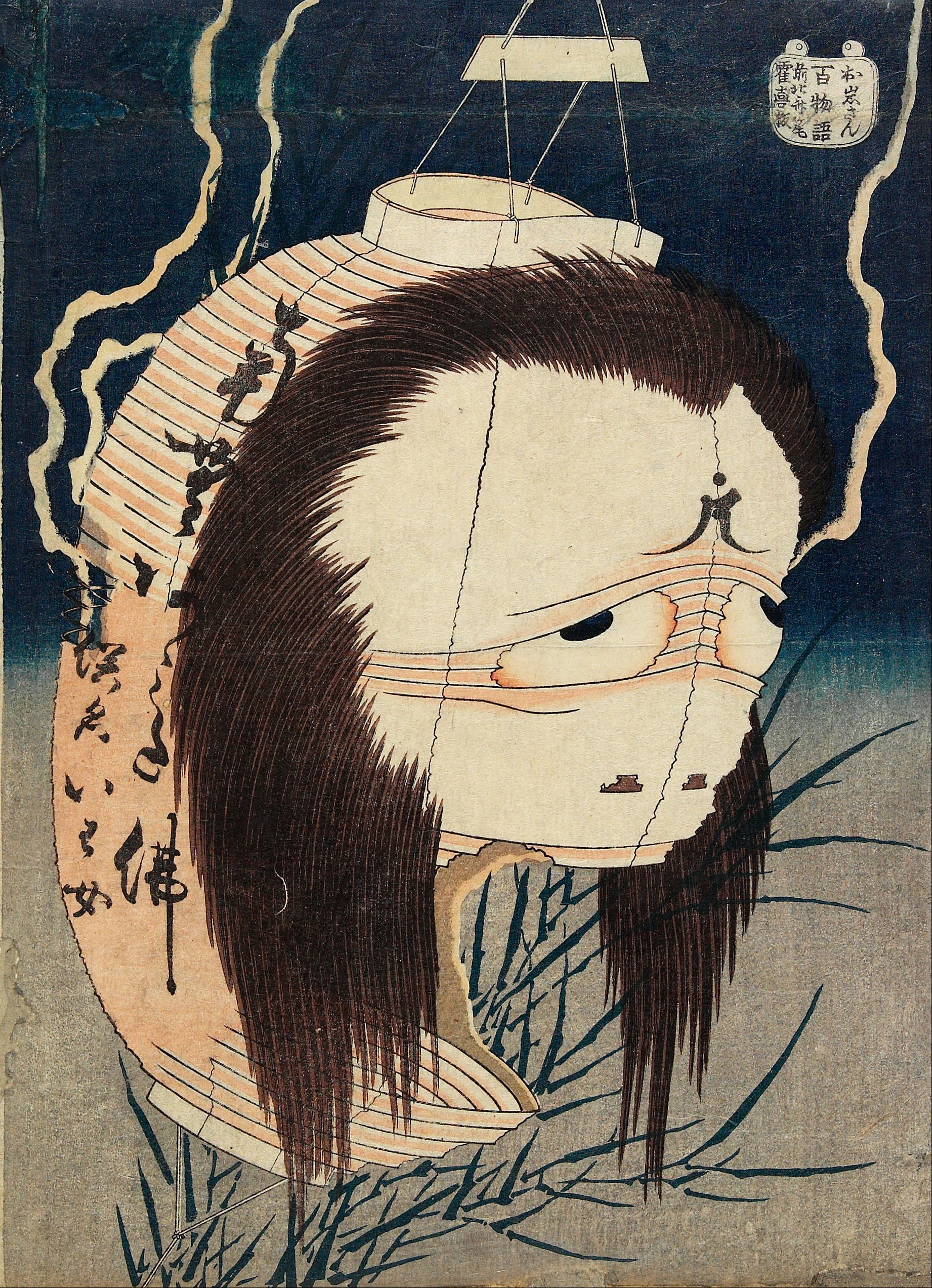
Hokusai, The Lantern Ghost, 1826/1837

The word つくも髪, which is also pronounced tsukumogami, appeared in a waka poem in the 9th-century The Tales of Ise, section 63. It is a compound of つくも tsukumo, of unknown meaning, and 髪 kami 'hair'. In the poem, it referred to an old woman's white hair, so tsukumo has been interpreted as meaning "old", often metaphorically represented as ninety-nine years.

The element 髪 kami 'hair' is a homophone of 神 kami 'spirit'; both may be pronounced -gami in compound words. Thus the word tsukumogami has come to mean a 99-year spirit. The kanji representation 付喪神 for tsukumogami in this sense dates to a Tenpō period otogizōshi, an emakimono called the Tsukumogami Emaki. According to this emaki, a tool, after the passage of 100 years, would develop a spirit (kami), and with this change would become a tsukumogami. This emaki has a caption stating that the word tsukumo could also be written with the kanji 九十九, meaning 'ninety-nine' (years).

Outside of these uses, the word tsukumogami is not attested in the surviving literature of the time, and so the historical usage of the term itself has not been handed down in detail. The concept, however, does appear elsewhere. In collections such as the late Heian period Konjaku Monogatarishū, there are tales of objects having spirits, and in the emakimono Bakemono Zōshi, there are tales of a chōshi (a saké serving-pot), a scarecrow, and other inanimate objects turning into monsters, but the word tsukumogami itself does not appear.

The Tsukumogami Emaki describes how an object would become occupied by a spirit after one hundred years, so people would throw out old objects before they became a hundred years old, which was called the "susu-harai" (煤払い, literally "sweeping soot", i.e. year-end house cleaning). By doing this, they prevented objects from becoming tsukumogami, but according to the captions of this emaki, it is written that ones that are "a year from one hundred," in other words, objects that are tsukumo (ninety-nine) years old would become angered and become a yōkai by some means other than the mere passage of time, and then cause a ruckus.

In the first place, the idea of becoming a yōkai at one hundred or ninety-nine years old does not need to be taken literally. Those numbers can represent the idea that humans, plants, animals, or even tools would acquire a spiritual nature once they become significantly old, and thereby gain the power to change themselves. Writing tsukumo as 九十九 ("ninety-nine") is not simply referring to a number, since the word was used since old times to loosely mean "many". The yōkai that are depicted are not ones that gained the power to change themselves as a result of being used for a long time, but rather ones that were thrown away right before it, becoming a yōkai through some different means.

== Paintings ==
In the Tsukumogami Emaki, which depicted tsukumogami, it is written at the very beginning, "It's told in the Onmyō Zakki. A tool, after one hundred years pass, would change and acquire a spirit, and deceive people's hearts, and it's said these are referred to as tsukumogami," thus referring to changes or mutations of tools as "tsukumogami" (however, no book called the Onmyō Zakki has actually been confirmed to exist). In the emaki, it's written that they can take on "the appearance of people male and female, old and young" (appearance of humans), "the likeness of chimi akki" (appearance of oni), and "the shape of korō yakan" (the appearance of animals), among others. Its form after its change/mutation is referred to with words such as youbutsu (妖物).

Even in emakimono that came before the Tsukumogami Emaki, paintings of yōkai based on tools can be confirmed, and in the Tsuchigumo Zōshi, there were depictions of gotoku (trivets) with heads, stamp mills with the body of a snake and two human arms attached to it, and a tsunodarai (four-handled basin) with a face and growing teeth, among others. Also, a face that appears to be what the tsunodarai is based on appears in the Yūzū Nenbutsu Engi Emaki (融通念仏縁起絵巻) and the Fudō Rieki Engi Emaki (不動利益縁起絵巻) where a yakugami with almost the same appearance appears. However, all of these were not merely tools, but ones that are a hybrid with a tool or oni. This characteristic can also be seen in the Tsukumogami Emaki and the Hyakki Yagyō Emaki.

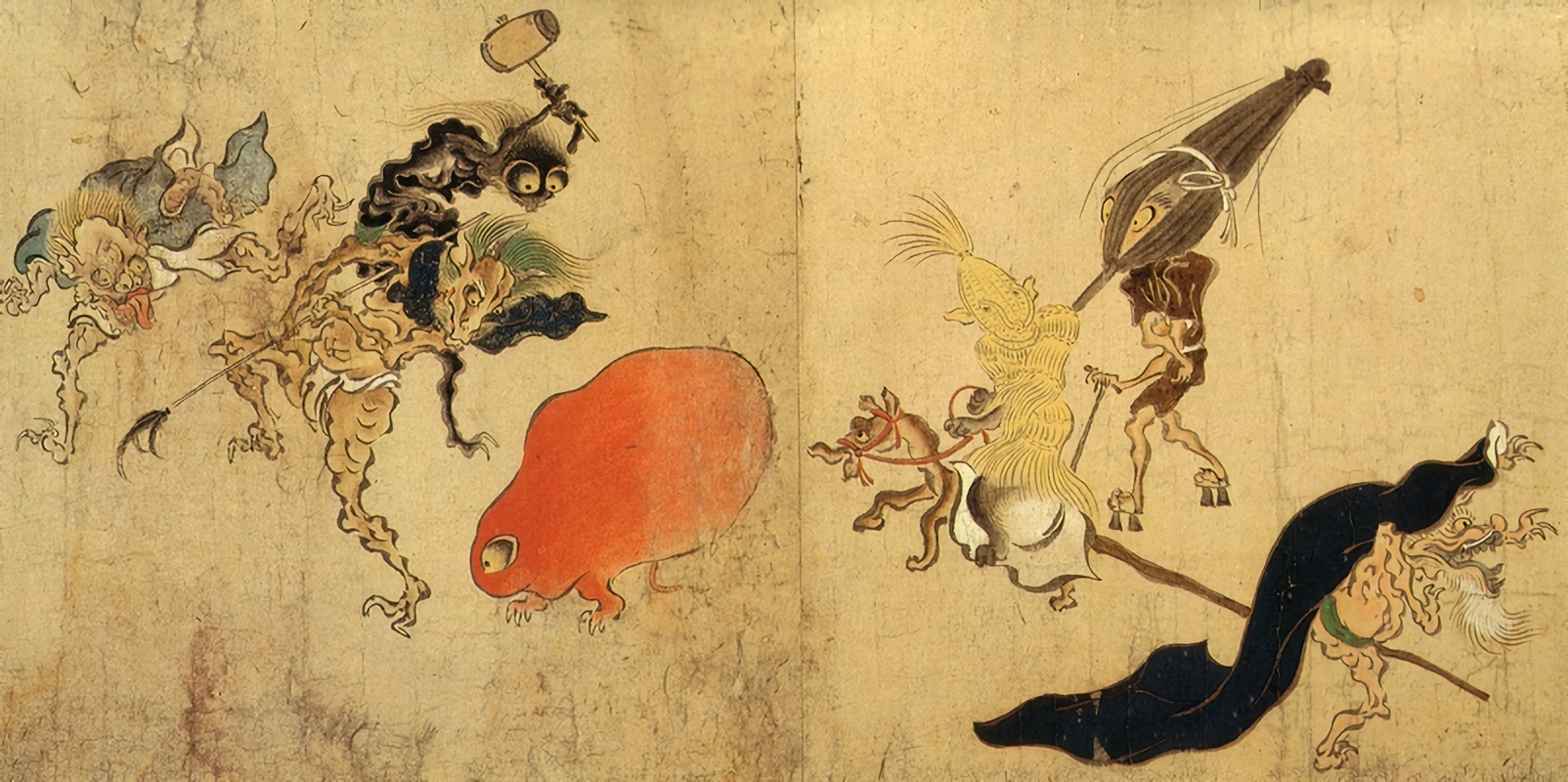
The Hyakki Yagyō Emaki from the Muromachi period, author unknown. They are yōkai of tools, so they are commonly thought of as tsukumogami.

The Hyakki Yagyō Emaki (百鬼夜行絵巻) from the Muromachi period also depicts many of what appear to be yōkai of tools. In the present day, these tools yōkai are thought to be depictions of tsukumogami, and it has been inferred that the parade depicted in the Hyakki Yagyō Emaki is likely the youbutsu (aged objects) of the Tsukumogami Emaki in a festival parade.

== Works about tools ==
In works about tools having a human personality, tools such as the chōdo uta-awase that would perform uta-awase can be found before the Muromachi period, and it is thought that these are close in concept to being the idea of "things that tools turn into" as depicted in the Tsukumogami Emaki.

Understood by many Western scholars, tsukumogami was a concept popular in Japanese folklore as far back as the tenth century, used in the spread of Shingon Buddhism.

== In Japanese folklore ==
According to Elison and Smith (1987), Tsukumogami was the name of an animated tea caddy that Matsunaga Hisahide used to bargain for peace with Oda Nobunaga.

Like many concepts in Japanese folklore, there are several layers of definition used when discussing Tsukumogami. For example, by the tenth century, the Tsukumogami myths were used in helping to spread the "doctrines of Shingon Esoteric Buddhism to a variety of audiences, ranging from the educated to the relatively unsophisticated, by capitalizing upon pre-existing spiritual beliefs in Tsukumogami." These "pre-existing spiritual beliefs" were, as Reider explains:

Tsukumogami are animate household objects. An otogizōshi ("companion tale") titled Tsukumogami ki ("Record of tool kami"; Muromachi period) explains that after a service life of nearly one hundred years, utsuwamono or kibutsu (containers, tools, and instruments) receive souls. While many references are made to this work as a major source for the definition of tsukumogami, insufficient attention has been paid to the actual text of Tsukumogami ki.

By the twentieth century the Tsukumogami had entered into Japanese popular culture to such an extent that the Buddhist teachings had been "completely lost to most outsiders," leaving critics to comment that, by and large, the Tsukumogami were harmless and at most tended to play occasional pranks, they did have the capacity for anger and would band together to take revenge upon those who were wasteful or threw them away thoughtlessly – compare mottainai. To prevent this, to this day some jinja ceremonies are performed to console broken and unusable items.

== List of tsukumogami ==
- Abumi-guchi – A furry creature formed from the stirrup of a mounted soldier who died in battle
- Bakezōri – A possessed zōri (traditional straw sandals)
- Biwa-bokuboku – An animated biwa
- Boroboroton – A possessed futon
- Byōbunozoki – A possessed folding screen
- Chōchin'obake – An animated lantern, also known as burabura
- Furu-utsubo – An archer's quiver
- Ichiren-bozu – Animated prayer beads
- Ittan-momen – A roll of cotton
- Jatai – Possessed cloths draped from folding screens
- Kameosa – A possessed sake jar
- Kasa-obake – An animated paper umbrella. Also known as karakasa-obake. (Note: Although modern sources might guess that the kasa-obake is a tsukumogami, the initial sources that introduced it made no such reference (see page for kasa-obake). Therefore, its true nature is unknown.)
- Kosode-no-te – A possessed kimono robe
- Koto-furunushi – An animated koto
- Kurayarō – An animated saddle
- Kutsutsura – Kutsutsura are tsukumogami of shoes. They can take either a human form or an animal form. In human form, they look like a court noble wearing a shoe as a hat. In animal form, they appear as a round, hairy beast with a fur boot for a snout.
- Kyōrinrin – Possessed scrolls or papers
- Menreiki – A spiritual creature formed out of 66 gigaku masks
- Minowaraji – An animated mino straw coat
- Morinji-no-kama – A possessed teakettle. Another variation is zenfushō
- Shamichoro – An animated shamisen
- Shirōneri – Possessed mosquito nettings or dust cloths
- Shōgorō – An animated gong
- Ungaikyō – A possessed mirror
- Yamaoroshi – A possessed vegetable grater
- Zenfushō – A possessed teakettle
- Zorigami – A possessed clock

== See also ==
- Hyakkai Zukan
- List of legendary creatures from Japan
- Kami
- Wight
- Hobgoblin
- Fairy
- Homunculus
- Golem
