= Narigama =

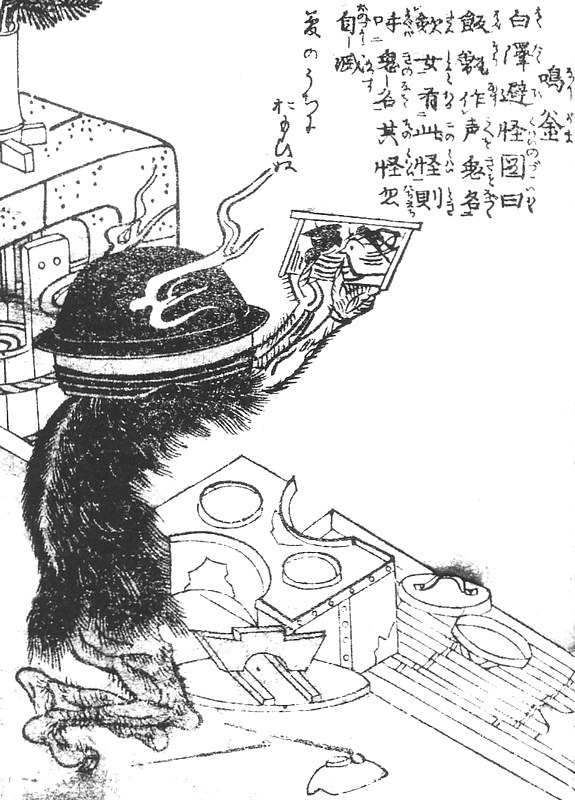
"Narigama" from Gazu Hyakki Tsurezure Bukuro by Toriyama Sekien

Narigama (鳴釜; or Narikama, Narukama) or Kamanari (釜鳴) is a Japanese yōkai depicted in Toriyama Sekien's yōkai art collection Gazu Hyakki Tsurezure Bukuro.

== Depiction ==
It is depicted as a hairy figure wearing a kama (iron pot) on its head and holding an ema (votive tablet) in its hand. In Sekien's commentary, he quotes a passage about liàn nǚ (斂女, Japanese: "renjo")—a yaoguai from China said to be found in the Baize Tu that makes sounds by ringing pots and the like—but he does not explicitly write about the Narigama itself. A yōkai of a pot is also depicted in the Muromachi period Hyakki Yagyō Emaki, and it is thought that this served as the model for the depiction of this yōkai.

== Folklore regarding Pot Sounds ==
The terms Narigama and Kamanari themselves refer to Shinto rituals in which fortune (good or bad luck) is judged based on the sound produced when a pot is heated with fire, or to folk beliefs that view a pot making unexpected sounds as an omen of good or bad luck. These practices are considered to be one of the origins for Sekien's naming of this yōkai. In such divination, it appears there was often an association with the Chinese zodiac.

A famous actual example is the Narukama Shinji (Ritual of the Sounding Pot) passed down at Kibitsu Shrine in Okayama Prefecture. This ritual is said to have begun when Ura, who was defeated by Kibitsuhiko-no-mikoto in the past, became a deity who delivered oracles to people, with good and bad fortune being announced through the sound of a pot. Additionally, a pot at a certain temple in Kyoto was said to predict the weather; it would sometimes make a sound like crying when boiling water, and it is said that it would always rain the following day.

== See also ==
- Tsukumogami
