= Karura =

Japanese mythological creature

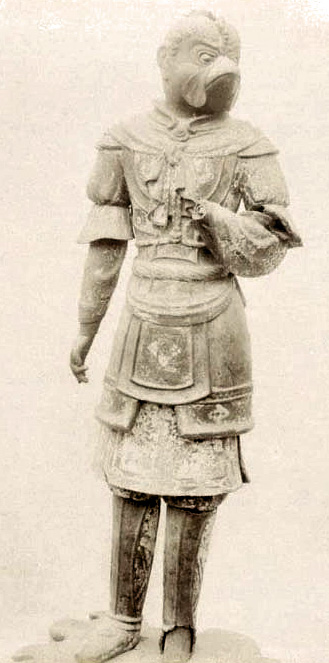
A statue depicting a wingless Karura from Kōfuku-ji, Nara, 8th century.

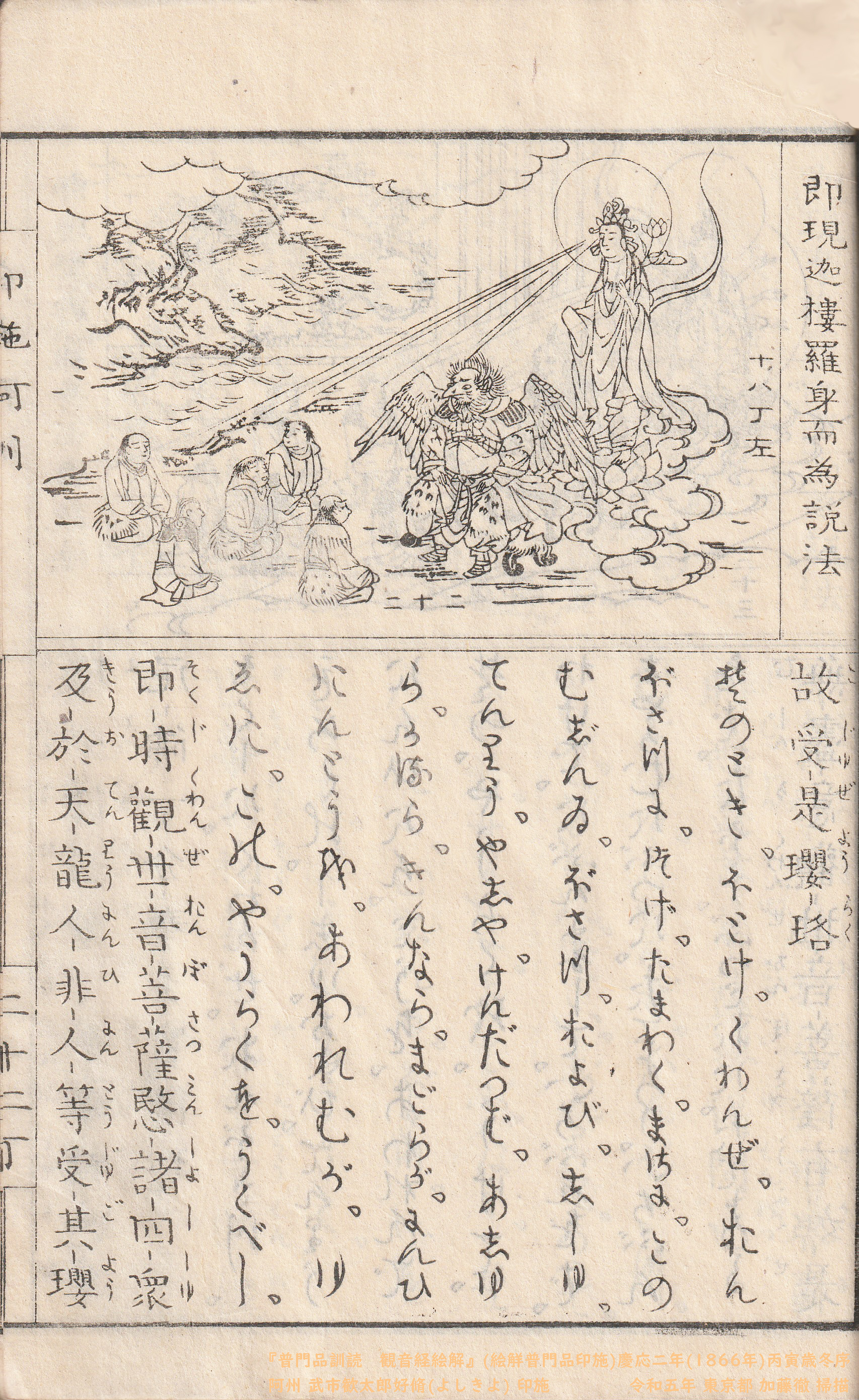
An illustration from an 1866 Japanese book. Karura, who is an incarnation of Bodhisattva Kannon in this scene, gives a sermon to folks.

The Karura (迦楼羅) is a divine creature with a human torso and birdlike head in Japanese mythology.

The name is a transliteration of garuda, a race of enormously gigantic birds in Hinduism. The Japanese Buddhist version is based upon Hindu Mythology. The same creature may go by the name of konjichō (金翅鳥, lit. "gold-winged bird"; Skr. suparṇa).

The karura is said to be enormous, fire-breathing, and to feed on dragons/serpents, just as Garuda is the bane of Nāgas. Only a dragon who possesses a Buddhist talisman, or one who has converted to the Buddhist teaching, can escape unharmed from the Karura. Shumisen or Mount Meru is said to be its habitat.

Karura is one of the proselytized and converted creatures recruited to form a guardian unit called the Hachibushū (八部衆; "Devas of the Eight Classes").

One famous example is the Karura statue at Kōfuku-ji, Nara, amongst the eight deva statues presented at the Buddhābhiṣeka dated to the year Tenpyō 6 or 734, pictured top right). This karura is depicted as wearing Tang Chinese-style armor, and thus is seen wingless.

But more conventionally, the Karura is depicted as a winged being with human torso and avian head, as in the Vajra Hall (Kongō buin (金剛部院)) section of the Womb Realm mandala (Taizōkai mandara (胎蔵界曼荼羅)) and other iconographic books and scrolls.

== In fine art ==
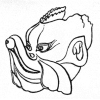
Karura gikau mask (source: Shuko Jisshu, Todaiji Hachimangu (1895))

The karura (garuda) mask is one of the stock character masks worn by performers of the ancient Japanese courtly dance art of gigaku.

The flaming nimbus or halo is known by the name "karura flame" and typically seen adorning behind the statue of the Fudō-myōō (不動明王)).

The karura is also said to be the prototype of the depictions of the tengu or karasutengu.

== In popular culture ==
The Pokémon evolutionary line of Magby, Magmar, and Magmortar may have been based on the karura.

In the anime Blue Exorcist Karura is a powerful fire demon that can be seen in service of the Myōō Dharani.

== See also ==
- Avalerion
- Garuda
- Kalaviṅka
- Kinnara
- List of avian humanoids
- List of Zatch Bell! characters
- Tengu
- Utawarerumono
