= Koto-furunushi =

Yōkai

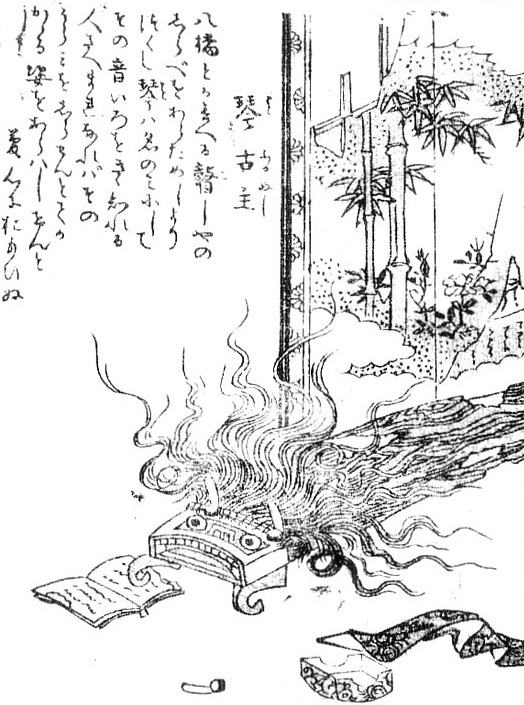
A Koto-furunushi, as appearing in Toriyama Sekien's Gazu Hyakki Tsurezure Bukuro (百器徒然袋).

The koto-furunushi (琴古主; English: "old master koto") is a fictitious being from Japanese folklore. It is a Yōkai and is said to be harmless to humans. The koto-furunushi is very similar to the yokai biwa-bokuboku.

== Description ==
The koto-furunushi has the appearance of a traditional koto (a Japanese zither), which grows a demonic face on its front. The strings start to meander in all directions, giving the impression of an uncombed mane. However, it is not handed down if the koto-furunushi can move on its own in any kind.

== Folklore ==
A famous legend comes from Saga prefecture on Kyūshū peninsula and is said to originate from the 2nd century A.D. It tells the story of the Emperor of Japan who had planned a palatial feast for his royal court. He chose Kanzaki as the festive place and he ordered his gardeners to clean and groom the chosen park. The legend reports that the emperor was so excited about the resulting beauty of the festive place that he left an enchanted koto as a present to the town of Kanzaki. A short time later, the koto magically transformed itself into a lush and noble camphor tree. From this day, it was told for centuries, that anybody who took a rest at the roots of the tree could hear the faint but irresistibly calming sounds of a zither from the treetop. Today, it is told that the exact whereabouts of the holy tree was forgotten in time, but the ghost of the camphor tree may dive into very old kotos to animate them.

== Background ==
The koto-furunushi belongs to a special group of yōkai: the tsukumogami (Japanese: 付喪神, lit. 'artifact ghosts'). Tsukumogami are derived from or possess various kinds of man-made household artifacts, such as kitchenware, tools, and everyday accessories, and though 100 years may pass, the artifact appears as good as if it was never in use. Koto-furunushi are said to come to life when "reaching their 100th birthday", but only if they were always treated with great respect. If so, they will always play the most enchanting music on their own, especially when no one watches them. Most times, the koto-furunushi will perform the songs that were played on them very often and with special devotion. If a koto-furunushi is instead ignored by its owner, it will become sad and then ask other tsukumogami to take it along with them. It then will play for its tsukumogami friends, forgetting its neglectful owner in time.
