= Ungaikyō =

Japanese folklore

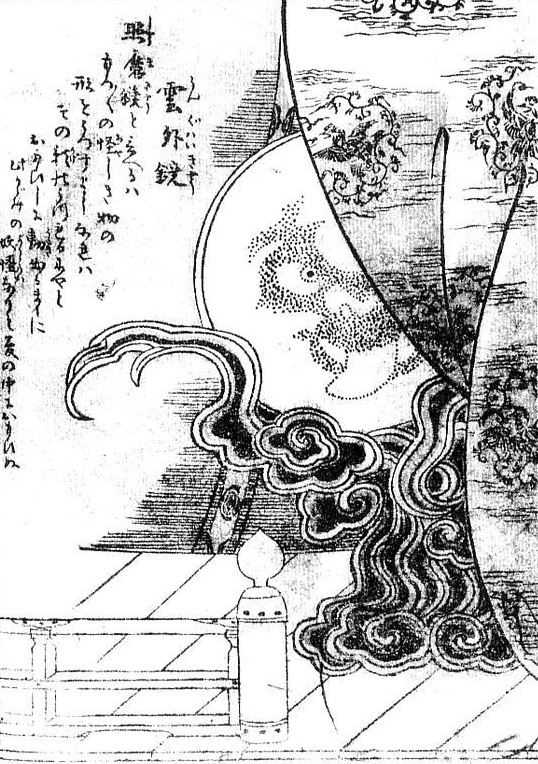
Ungaikyō, the mirror monster. —Gazu hyakki tsurezure bukuro by Toriyama Sekien (1784).

The ungaikyō (雲外鏡、うんがいきょう; "mirror beyond the clouds") is a yōkai in Japanese folklore or fiction, a type of mirror monster.

The monster is depicted in the Gazu hyakki tsurezure bukuro (1784), a collection of yōkai paintings by the Edo period ukiyo-e artist Toriyama Sekien.

Modern commentary considers it an example of a tsukumogami or possessed object often depicted with faces, etc., and the ability to maneuver.

== Mythology ==
Toriyama Sekien illustrated the "Ungaikyō" in his Gazu hyakki tsurezure bukuro (百器徒然袋; "The Illustrated Bag of One Hundred Random Demons" or "A Horde of Haunted Housewares", etc.), published in Tenmei 4/1784. (Note: Here hyakki (百器; "hundred vessels/containers"), not hyakki (百鬼; "hundred demons"). Also tsurezure (徒然; "out of boredom") has the original Chinese meaning of "aimless", etc., hence "Random".) As the title suggests, this work was a collection of haunted objects or tsukumogami.

Sekien drew "Ungaikyō" as a mirror with a mischievous looking face (tongue sticking out), held up on a tree-like stand (which resembles a torso with limbs: cf. image top right). Accompanying the drawing is the commentary as follows:

The so-called Shōmakyō (照魔鏡) ("Demon-shining mirror") is said reflect the [true] form of various mysterious things. I wondered if perhaps these [demons'] (Note: The foregoing ayashiki (怪しき; "mysterious") also goes to kai (怪; "weirdness, monster")) shadows may reflect (or transfer) onto it, making the mirror-yōkai move around of its own free will, or so I dreamed.

The shōmakyō (照魔鏡; lit. "illuminating-the demon-mirror"), in Chinese literature, is a legendary mirror that is said to reveal the true identity of demons, as Sekien states at the beginning of his commentary.

The shōmakyō (Chinese: 照魔镜, zhàomó jìng) in historical fiction was said to have revealed the true identity of Emperor Consort Daji of the crumbling Shang dynasty to have been the nine-tailed fox, according to, e.g. a Japanese adaptation (Note: Tsūzoku rekkoku shi (通俗列国志), published Hōei 2 or 1704/1705) of the Ming period novel Fengshen yanyi ("Investiture of the Gods").

The ungaikyō in Gazu Hyakki Tsurezure Bukuro is noted to be an original creation of Sekien Toriyama based on the shomakyo, and the accompanying picture shows it to be a mirror with a monstrous and mysterious face floating on it, as can be seen in the figure.

== Modern commentary ==
Books on yōkai since the Heisei era (post-1988) (Note: This is somewhat of a technicality. Because the mirror appears in Sekien's book on "haunted vessels", the ungaikyō was already considered as such back then. But it is difficult to find the term tsukumogami applied before the Heisei era.) describe the ungaikyō explicitly as a tsukumogami (an age-old vessel turned yōkai, where tsuku denotes demonic possession). According to some, the ungaikyō's face reflects the face of the yōkai that possessed it. Another scenario is that whichever yōkai reflected in the shōmakyō will gain control of the mirror and manipulate it.

One linguistic conjecture is that the name “ungaikyō” had been a pun played on Sengaikyō, the Japanese pronunciation of the Chinese geography treatise Shanhai jing (Classic of Mountains and Seas), which describes a number of yōkai.

The possessed mirror manifests such characteristics as manipulating people's reflections to resemble what they prefer, transforming any human who looks into the ungaikyō into a monstrous version of themselves as the reflection shown, or (for a human to use) to trap spirits in them.

== The mirror monster ==
In a book written by yōkai manga artist Shigeru Mizuki, there is a legend that on the fifteenth night of the eighth month (Hazuki) of the lunar calendar, if one fills a quartz tray with water under the moonlight, and use that water to trace an image of a yōkai on the mirror, that yōkai will then dwell inside the mirror.

== In popular culture ==
The ungaikyō in the 1968 film Yokai Monsters: Spook Warfare (Daiei Film) is designed as a yōkai in the shape of a raccoon dog. In the film, it has the ability to inhale and puff out its belly into a sort of giant TV screen, then display scenes from various places.

It is pointed out that many yōkai illustrated books for children since the Shōwa era (1926–1989) often ascribes a raccoon dog-like appearance to the ungaikyō and gives it the ability to show images on its pot belly due to the influence of the aforementioned film.
