= Abumi-guchi =

Yōkai in Gazu Hyakki Tsurezure Bukuro

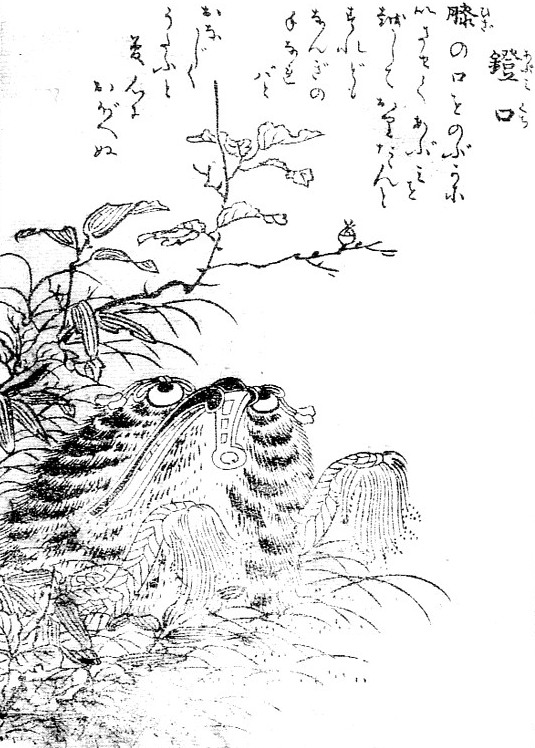
An abumi-guchi as depicted in Toriyama Sekien's Gazu Hyakki Tsurezure Bukuro

An abumi-guchi (鐙口; lit. "stirrup mouth") is a strange furry yōkai, or Japanese monster, that is illustrated in Sekien Toriyama's Gazu Hyakki Tsurezure Bukuro.

== Mythology ==
It is a type of tsukumogami formed from a stirrup, usually one that once belonged to a dead soldier that fell in battle. It is said that the abumi-guchi will wait where it lies for the dead soldier to return.
