= Menreiki =

Yōkai

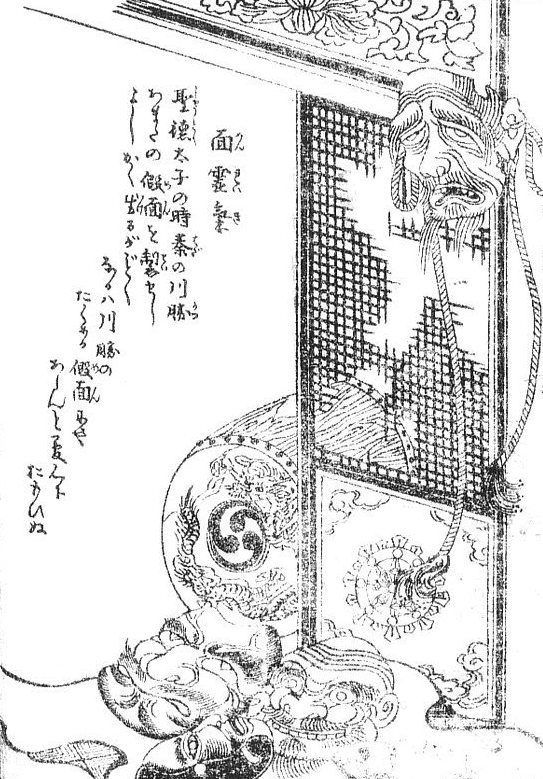
Menreiki as depicted in the Gazu Hyakki Tsurezure Bukuro.

Menreiki (面霊気) is a type of monster in Japanese folklore, composed of Gigaku masks. It is listed within the 1781 compendium of Japanese supernatural entities, entitled Gazu Hyakki Tsurezure Bukuro.

It is mentioned in folklore that during the time of Prince Shotoku, the prince created various Gigaku masks which were used by Hata no Kawakatsu, and that the Menreiki is based on those masks.
