= Boroboroton =

Japanese folklore

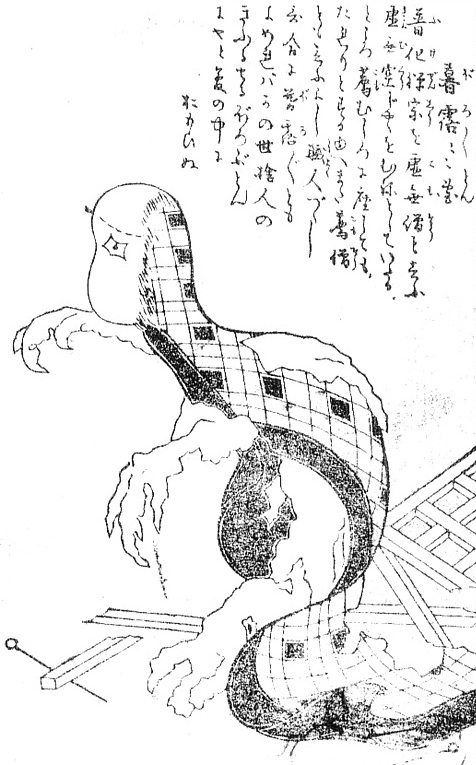
Boroboroton as depicted in Toriyama Sekien's Hyakki Tsurezure Bukuro (百器徒然袋).

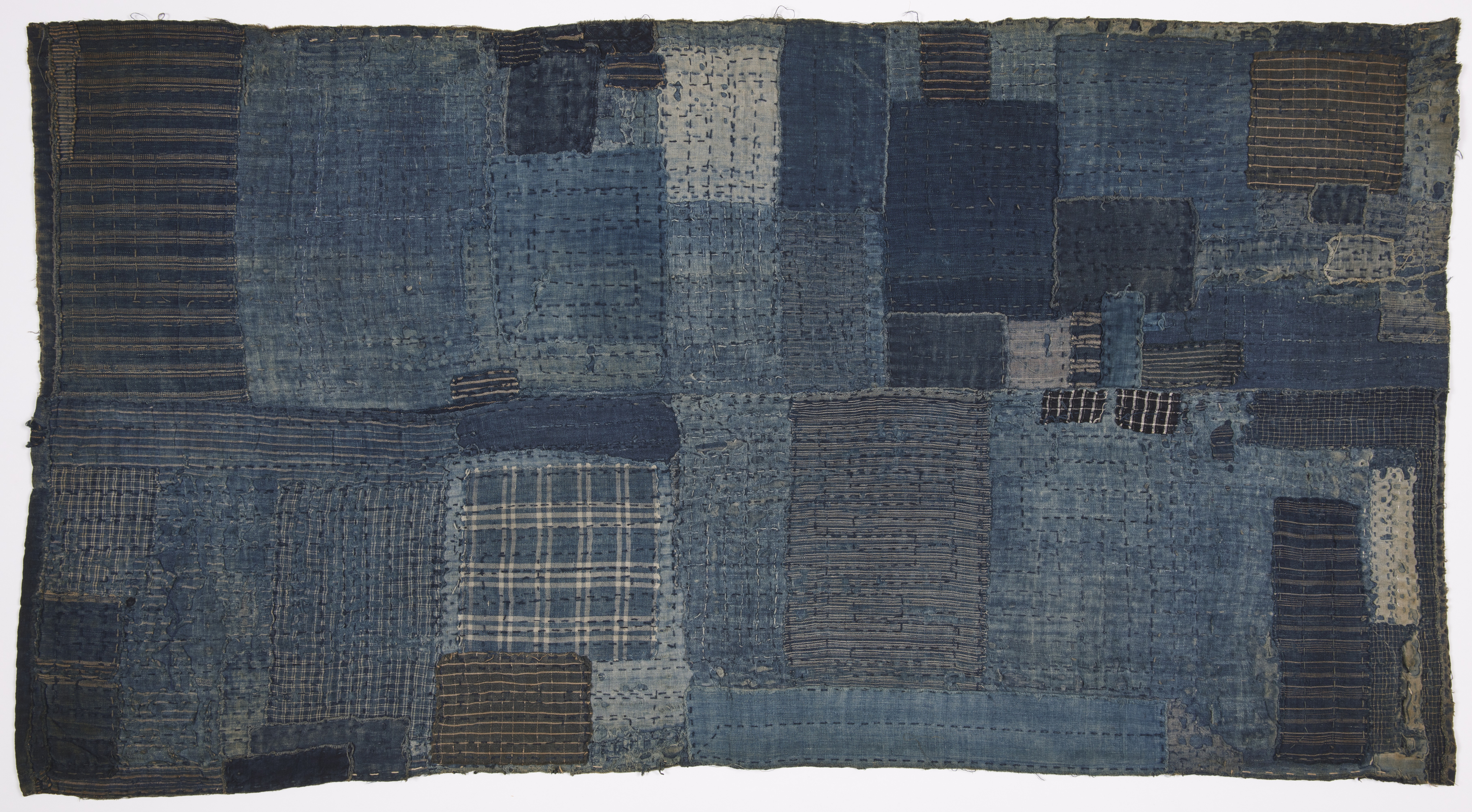
Child's shikibuton, late 1800s. Boroboro (patchwork) held together with over-all quilting stitching; see sashiko.

The Boroboroton (Japanese: 暮露暮露団 [bo̞ɺo̞bo̞ɺo̞to̞ɴ]; meaning "boroboro (tattered) futon") is a tsukumogami yōkai, and is believed to be evil and dangerous to humans.

== Description ==
The Boroboroton is described as a tattered futon (a Japanese sleeping mat) who comes to life at night. It rises up into the air and throws its (former) owner out of bed, then begins to twine around the head and neck of the sleeper with the intent of strangling him.

== Background ==
The Boroboroton belongs to a specific group of yōkai: the Tsukumogami (Japanese: 付喪神, lit. 'artifact spirit'). Tsukumogami are various yōkai derived from manmade objects, such as kitchenware, tools and everyday accessories, that have become alive, either through possession by spirits or ghosts, or through constant use for at least 90 to 100 years. Tsukumogami of this last origin often appear as new, or otherwise pristine condition despite their age. Boroboroton will come to life when feeling ignored or unneeded. As some kind of revenge (and out of frustration), they float through the rooms of inhabited houses at night and try to strangle any sleeping person they can find. Alternatively, they meet with other Tsukumogami and throw noisy parties or they leave the house and stroll around in search of other companion beings.
