= Gigaku =

Historic Japanese drama-dance performance

Gigaku (伎楽), also known as kure-gaku (呉楽), refers to a genre of masked drama-dance performance, imported into Japan during the Asuka period. This form of masked dance drama declined by the Kamakura period and became essentially extinct, although there are modern attempts at revival. It had influences on a number of Japanese performance arts such as Noh, bugaku, and kyōgen theatres and shishimai performances.

== History ==
Records state that gigaku was introduced during the 20th year of the reign of Empress Suiko (612 AD) by a certain Mimaji (味摩之) from Kudara kingdom (Baekje), one of the Three Kingdoms of Korea. According to accounts, Mimaji arrived in Sakurai and taught gigaku to the Japanese youth. It is said that he had studied gigaku in Wu (China), showing that the origins of gigaku can be traced back to China, as during the Suiko period (593/604–658 AD), the Japanese court took heavy influence from Chinese and Korean culture. The regent at the time, Prince Shōtoku, played a decisive role in allowing and diffusing Buddhist culture within Japan; this spread of culture allowed gigaku to be performed and viewed by many Japanese individuals, as it promoted the religion. Gigaku peaked during the first half of the 8th century, but began to disappear when bugaku took over as the official entertainment of the imperial palace, though gigaku was still performed and taught in areas far from the capital and continued to play a role in Japanese entertainment until up to the 14th century. Many wooden gigaku masks were painted at this time, most dating from the Nara period (710–784), and are now preserved at the Hōryūji and Tōdaiji temples and the imperial treasure house (Shōsōin), all in Nara. Masks were an integral aspect of gigaku theatre and represented various characteristics and properties and later influenced other parts of Japanese theatre.

The history of gigaku is often widely debated, as there is no documentation of gigaku in mainland Asia aside from a few extant masks. This lack of strong evidence often makes it difficult for researchers to decipher the true origins of gigaku, and its processes, characters, plots, and performances.

== Performance ==
Gigaku was performed in silent mime, to the accompaniment of music. The flute, waist drum (or hip drum (腰鼓, yōko), also known as kuretsuzumi (呉鼓, 'Wu drum')), and shōban (鉦盤), a type of gong, were the three instruments used in the Nara period, though the gong was superseded by a type of cymbal (dobyōshi (銅鈸子)) in the early Heian period (9th century).

About the only surviving description of the performance comes from the musical treatise forming a part of the Kyōkunshō (教訓抄; 'Selections for Instructions and Admonition') authored by Koma no Chikazane (died 1242). According to this, the netori, or tuning of instruments, signals the start, followed by a prelude of instruments. Then there is a parading of the whole cast, both dancers and instrumentalists. It has been speculated that the character mask named Chidō (治道) probably took position at the front of the parade, especially as this mask is listed first off in the assets ledgers (Shizaichō (資材帳)) for some of the temples that house gigaku masks. The program opens with the Lion Dance (Shishimai), and solo dances by the Duke of Wu, wrestler, the birdman karura, and the Brahman priest.

== Archetypes ==
There are two wrestler archetype characters, the Kongō (金剛) or "Vajra-yakṣa" who is open-mouthed, and the Rikishi (力士) who is closed mouthed. These two are said to be analogous to the two Niō or guardian gate statues, who respectively form the open and closed A-un shapes in their mouths. Rikishi and Konron masks are often mixed up due to their similar features, they possess a darker complexion, bulging eyes, large mouths and jutting teeth. These masks can be differentiated through their facial expressions as the Konron is less aggressive than Rikishi.

With the exaggerated features of many of the masks, the content of the play is described as being farcical. Indeed, the two-part play of the Kuron (崑崙) (or Konron; Chinese: Kunlun nu which denotes a black man or negrito) and the Rikishi (wrestler or "Strong Man") is outright obscene.

In the ribald performance, the lascivious Kuron falls in lust for the Gojo (Wu woman or Chinese maiden), and expresses his desire by holding up his phallic prop called marakata (陽物(マラカタ)), and beating it with his hand fan. The comic dance maneuvers are referred to as marafuri-mai (マラフリ舞, 'phallus-swinging dance'). In subsequent development, the Kuron is subdued by the Rikishi who binds the Kuron by his equipment (marakata), and drags him along by the noose around his manhood.

== Masks ==
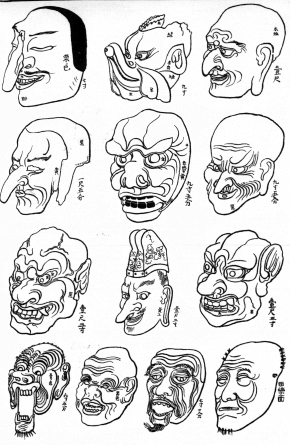
Gigaku masks from Horyuji temple

- Chidō (治道) "Govern the way" – Leads the procession part. This mask has been suggested as precursor of the depiction of Tengu masks; it was a red headed mask with a wide mouth, long nose, wide bulging eyes, dark brows and sometimes contained few whiskers on the chin.
- Shishi (師子) "lion" – Lion mask with movable jaw, ear, eyes, similar in appearance to the mask from Shishimai lion dance. The mask contained tiny ears applied to a large circular face, a red tongue and snout, white teeth, brown, red, or green.
- Shishiko (師子児) "lion tamers" – Usually two tamers accompany each lion
- Gokō (呉公) "Duke of Wu"
- Kongō (金剛) "Vajra-yakṣa)" – Topknotted wrestler, wide-eyed and flexed eyebrows, open-mouthed. Serves Lord of Wu.
- Karura (迦楼羅) "Garuḍa"
- Kuron (崑崙) "Kunlun (black man)"
- Gojo (呉女) "Wu woman" or "Chinese maiden"
- Rikishi (力士) "wrestler" or "Strong Man" – Topknotted wrestler like Kongo, but closed-mouthed.
- Baramon (波羅門) – "Brāhmaṇa" priests
- Taikofu (太弧父) "old widower"
- Taikoji (太弧児) "old widower's child"
- Suikoō (酔胡王) "drunken Persian king" or "Drunken Hu barbarian"
- Suikojū (酔胡従) "drunken Persian's followers" – about 6–8 of them accompany the drunken Persian king.

== Influence ==
Many of these masks also influenced other Japanese theatre forms; Noh, for example particularly has masks very similar to the gigaku masks of goko and gojo. The well resemblance of gojo can be seen in the well known Noh mask of Koomote as well as Chido and Konron to the ghost and demon masks with their stark, exaggerated, and frightening features. Though these masks share similarities, there are also differences. For example the masks of Noh are much smaller in comparison to gigaku, this is also the case with bugaku (the emerging theatre form after gigaku).

== See also ==
- Gagaku
- Karura
- Kunlun Mountain (mythology)
- Menreiki
- Noh mask
- Sangaku (theater)
- Theatre in Japan
