= Biwa-bokuboku =

Creature in Japanese folklore

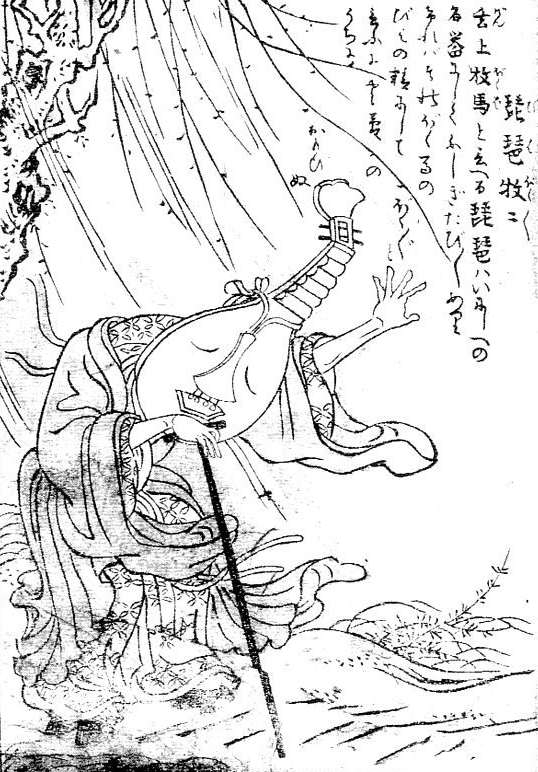
A Biwa-bokuboku as illustrated in Toriyama Sekien's Hyakki Tsurezure Bukuro (百器徒然袋).

The Biwa-bokuboku (Japanese: 琵琶牧々; meaning "Biwa goblin") is a fictitious being from Japanese folklore. It belongs to a group of yokai and is said to have an ambivalent character.

== Description ==
The Biwa-bokuboku is described as an anthropomorphic being with the head of a traditional biwa. He is also said to wear precious kimono. The Biwa-bokuboku comes to life at night and sits calmly in a tatami room, singing and plinking while lamenting the neglect of his former owner. Other stories report of Biwa-bokuboku dancing through inhabited houses while making much noise.

== Background ==
The Biwa-bokuboku was modeled after the biwa (琵琶), a short-necked, wooden lute. Toriyama Sekien reports in his work Hyakki Tsurezure Bukuro (百器徒然袋) that the biwa was designed after Chinese instruments such as the bokuma and the genjō.

The Biwa-bokuboku belongs to a special group of yōkai: the Tsukumogami (Japanese: 付喪神, lit. 'artifact ghosts'). This special group is believed to comprise nearly all kinds of man-made household artifacts, such as kitchenware, tools and every-day accessories, when 100 years have passed and the artifact was as good as if it had never been used. The Biwa-bokuboku will come to life when feeling ignored or useless. As revenge (and out of frustration), they wander through the rooms of inhabited houses at night and lament loudly over their neglect. Alternatively, they meet with other Tsukumogami and throw noisy parties or they leave home and stroll around in search of others with whom to commiserate.
