= Miyoshi Mononoke Museum =

Museum in Hiroshima prefecture, Japan

- Yumoto Koichi Memorial Japan Yōkai Museum
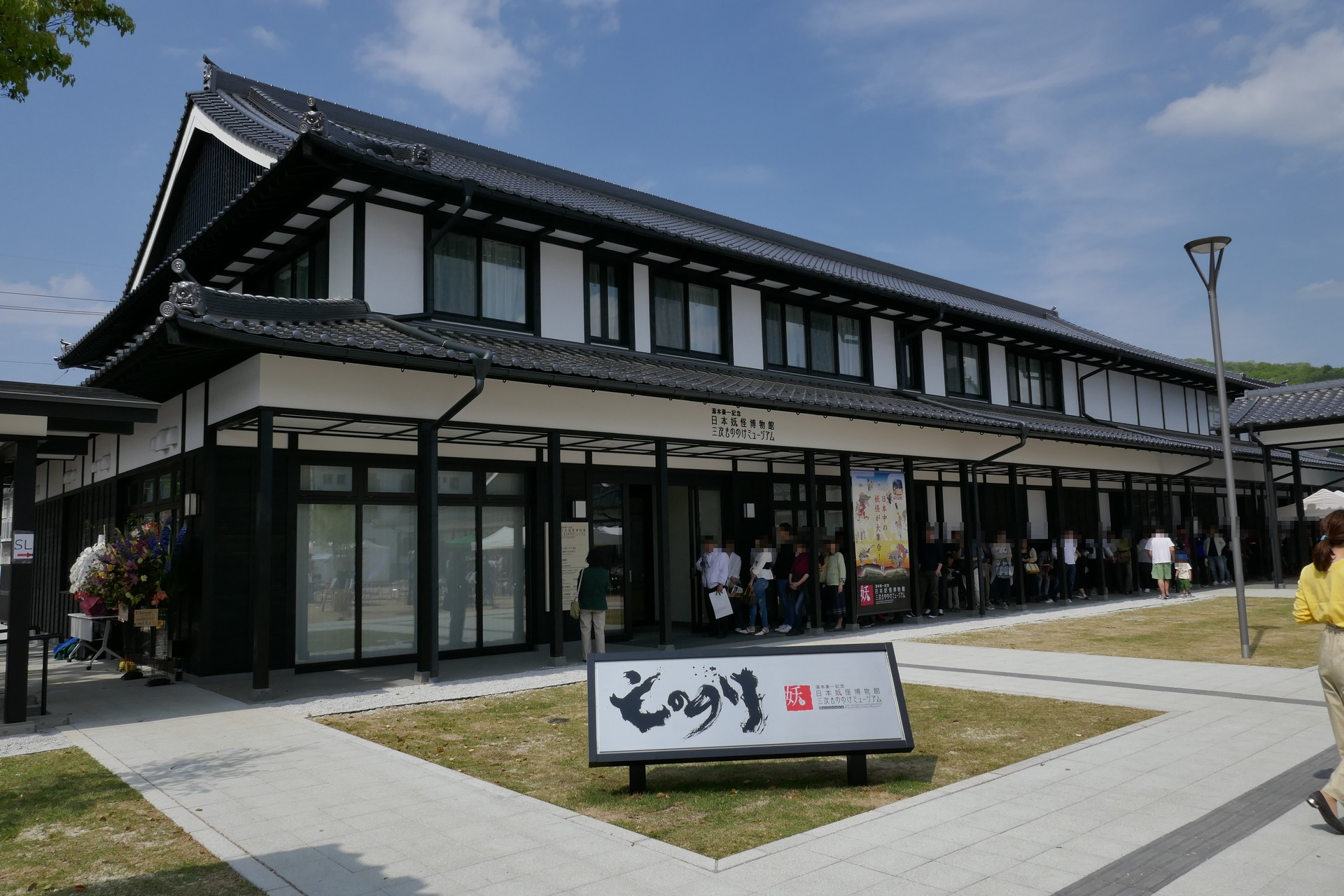

- Location within Japan
- Coordinates: 33°48′55.3″N 132°50′42.6″E
- Collections: art and objects representing Yōkai
- Collection size: 5,000+ objects
- Founder: Yumoto Koichi
- Website: miyoshi-mononoke.jp

The Miyoshi Mononoke Museum, also known as the Yumoto Koichi Memorial Japan Yōkai Museum, or shortened to the Yōkai Museum, is located in Miyoshi, Hiroshima Prefecture, in western Honshu, Japan. The museum collection holds over 5,000 artworks and objects that represent yōkai, supernatural beings in Japanese folklore.

The museum was founded in 2019 by Yumoto Kōichi, a scholar of yōkai who has also written numerous books on the subject of Japanese monsters, supernatural entities and mythological creatures.

The museum is located at 1691-4 Miyoshimachi, in Miyoshi City. The two-story museum building is constructed of steel, and was designed by K Structural Research Institute. The ground floor of the museum features an entrance hall, reception area, museum shop and an exhibition hall that houses the permanent collection as well as changing special exhibitions and a "hands-on" gallery. The second floor of the museum includes a conference room, work and training room and collection storage.

== Examples of Yōkai ==
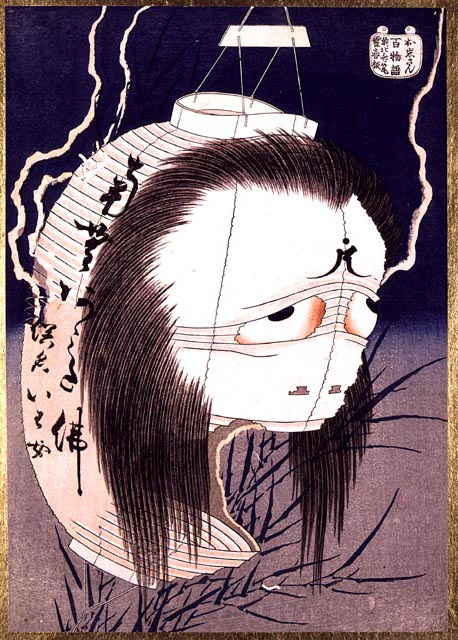
Shunkosai Hokuei Obake (haunted lantern)

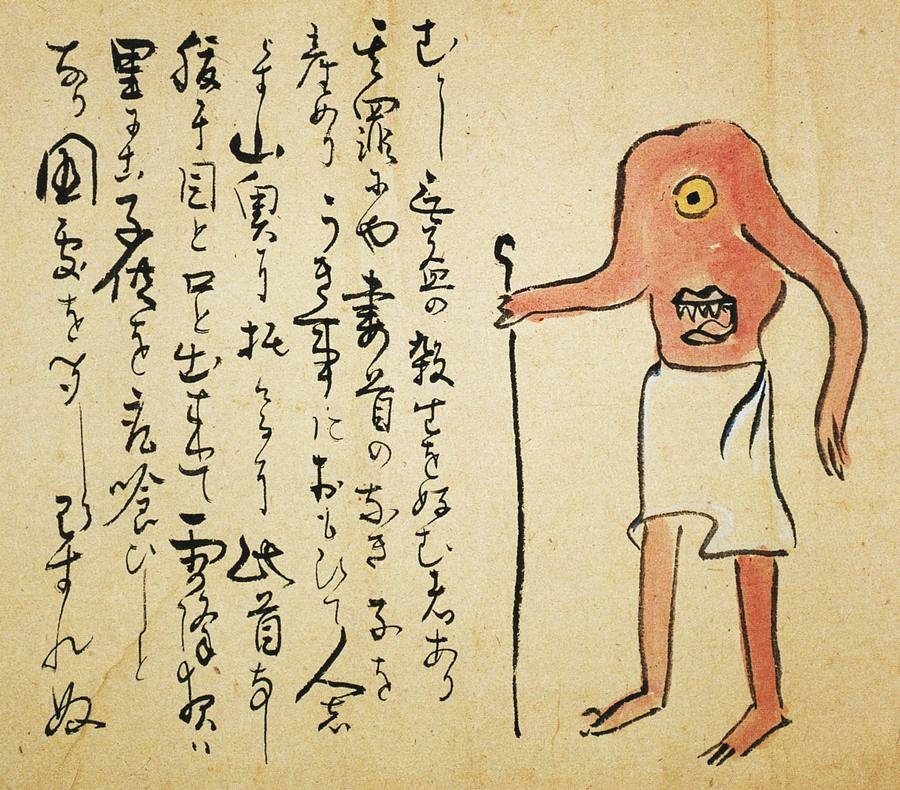
Yōkai without a head

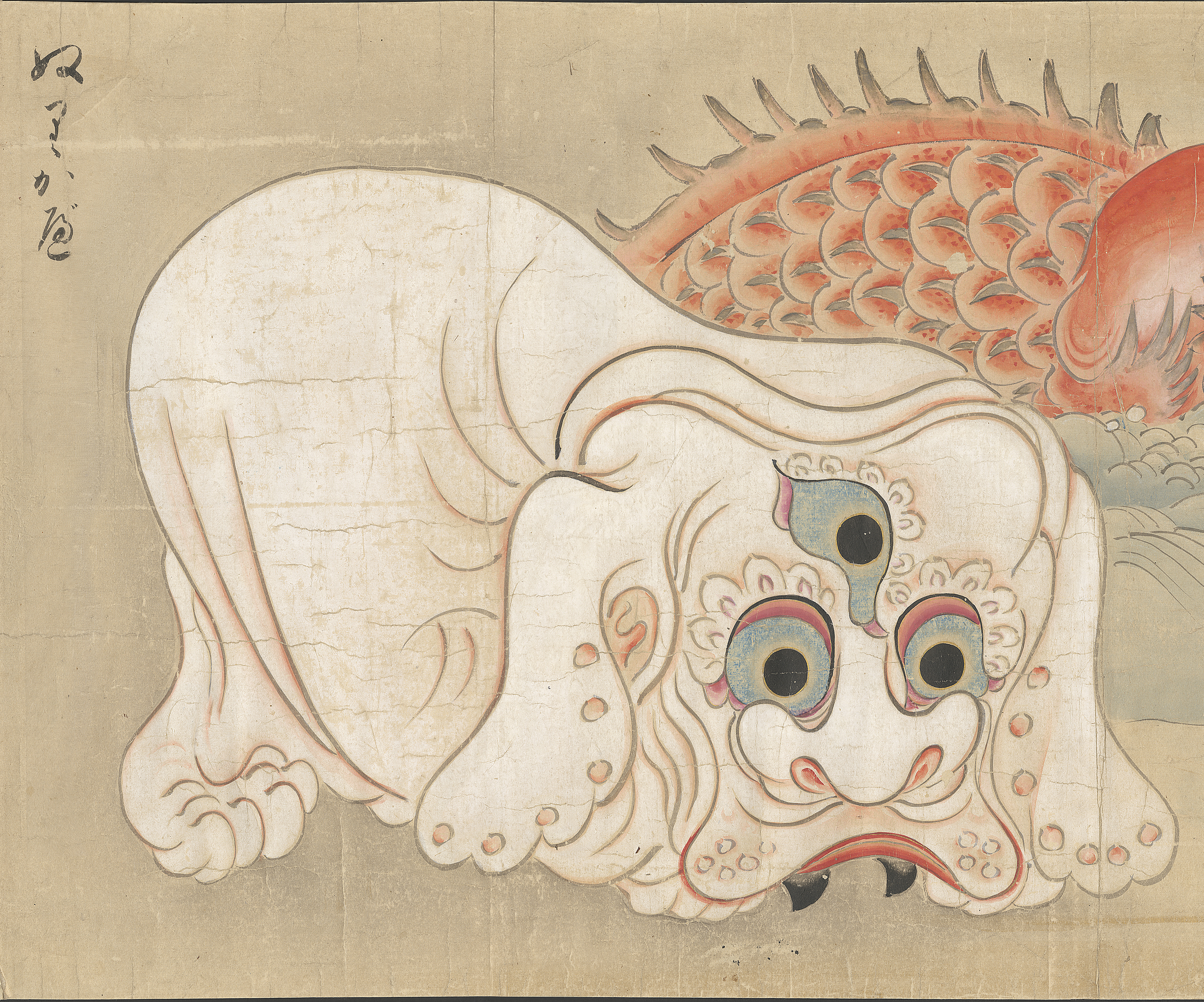
Nurikabe a haunted plaster wall Yōkai

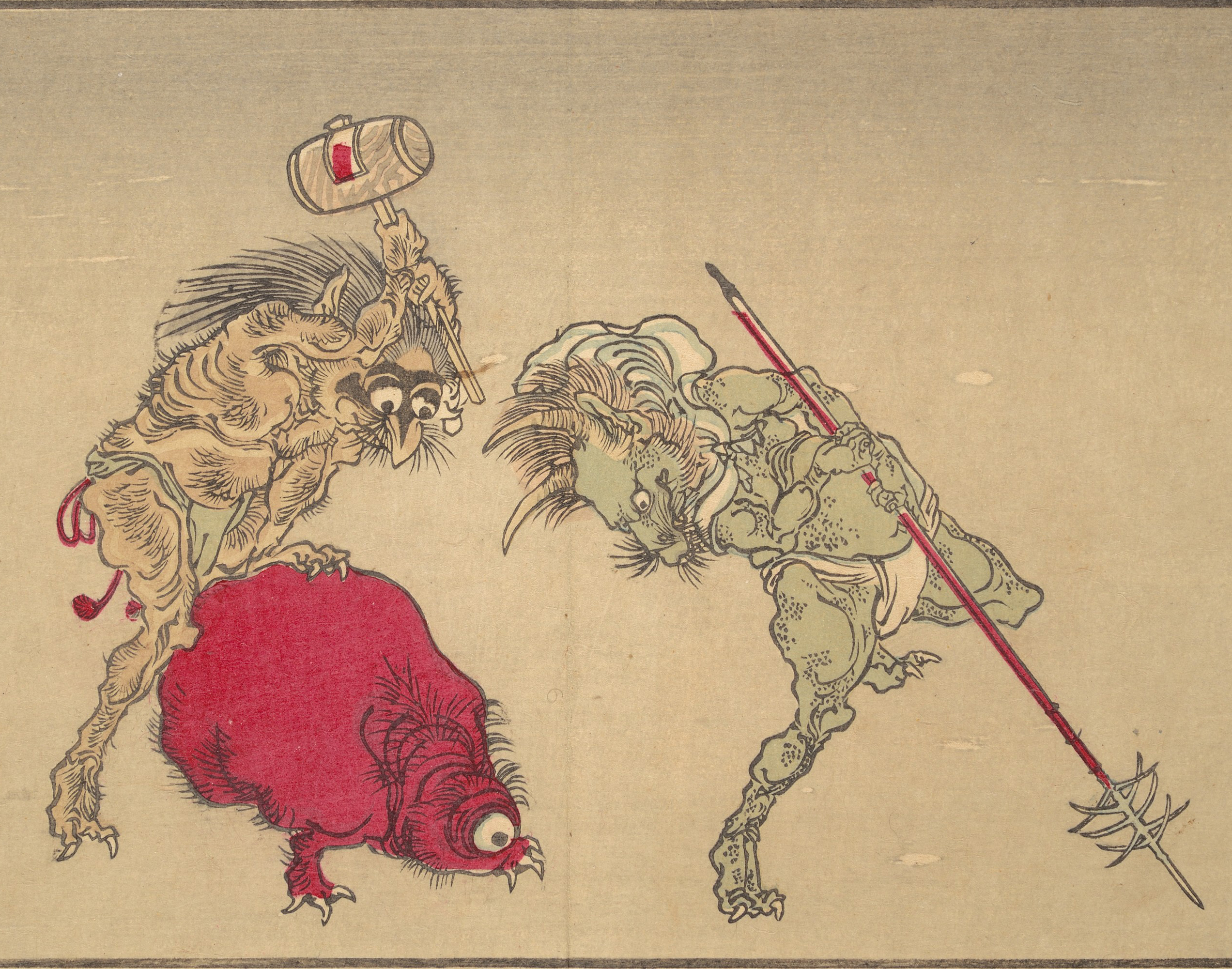
Yōkai supernatural creatures

== See also ==
- Ayakashi (yōkai)
- Japanese folklore
- List of legendary creatures from Japan
- Shodoshima Yokai Art Museum
- Mononoke
- Yōkai
- Yōsei
- Yūrei
