= Shuihu =

Chinese mythical creature

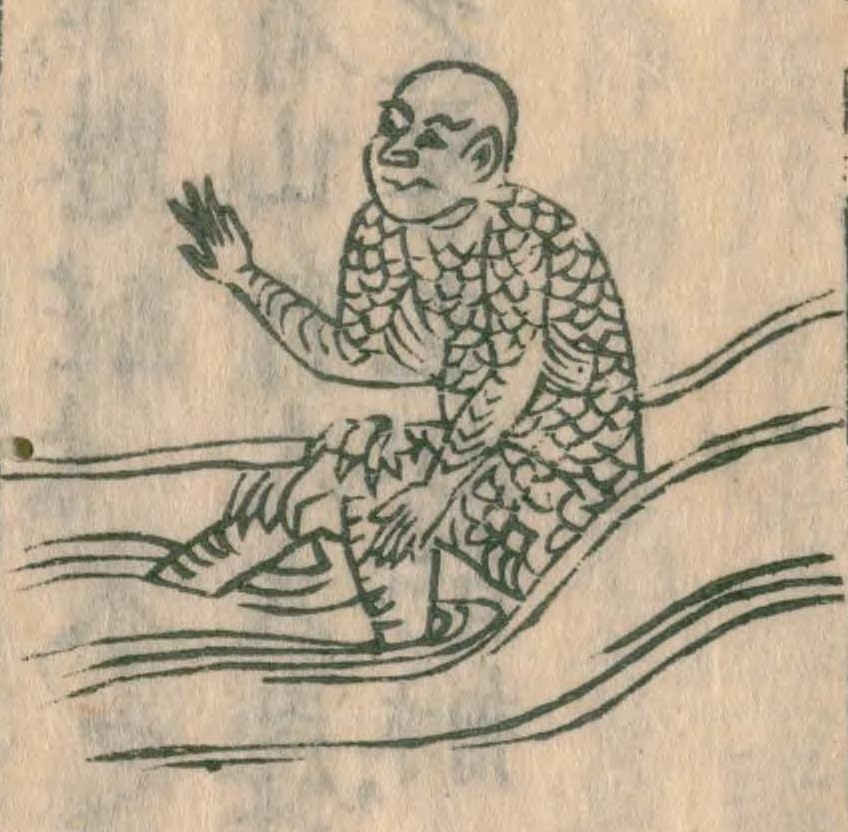
Suiko, from the encyclopedia Wakan Sansai Zue (1712) compiled by Terashima Ryōan.

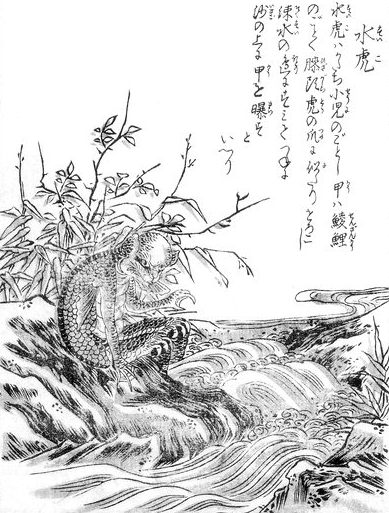
Suiko, from one of Toriyama Sekien's illustrated series, Konjaku Gazu Zoku Hyakki. (Note: The accompanying text reads: "Suiko is shaped like a child. Its carapace resembles that of a pangolin, and its kneecaps are sharp like tiger claws. It dwells in China's Sushui River, where it is often seen on the sand, drying its shell". The carapace/shell (甲) is described as like those of a 綾鯉 (pangolin) which would normally be read with the on'yomi reading ryōri, but Toriyama here forces the reading of senzankō, the modern-day common term for pangolin in Japan.)

A shuihu or shui hu (Chinese: 水虎; pinyin: shuǐhǔ; Wade–Giles: shui-hu; Japanese pronunciation: suiko; lit. 'water tiger'), (Note: Unschuld translates in two words, shui hu. The hyphenated form shui-hu adheres to the Wade-Giles system, used by Strassberg for example.) is a legendary creature said to have inhabited river systems in what is now Hubei Province, China.

== Overview ==
The name shuihu (or suiko) derives from the creature possessing physical characteristics reminiscent of a tiger (虎, Chinese pronunciation: hu; Japanese: ko/tora).

The water tiger is described as similar (in size) to a 3 or 4-year old human child, with tiger-like head and lower limb, and covered with tough scales resisting arrows. It basks on sandbars, while keeping their claws submerged in water. If a human tries to tamper with he may be killed.

Japanese books during the Tokugawa Period read the Chinese text rather differently. Wakan Sansai Zue, an influential encyclopedia of the early 18th-century, gave a considerably divergent reading and stated that the suiko possessed kneecaps like tiger-claws. This odd feature was replicated in its woodcut illustration, and propagated in Toriyama Sekien's drawing of the suiko in his yōkai anthology.

Though the Wakan Sansai Zue considered the shuihu / suiko to be a creature similar to, but distinguished from the kawatarō (more commonly known as kappa, other works during the Edo period commonly used the sinitic term suiko as a synonym of kappa.

Past Japanese writers also sometimes used suiko (水虎; 'water tiger') as a stilted Sinitic term for the kappa (also kawatarō) in native folklore, even though Wakan Sansai Zue had distinguished these as two separate beings.

== General description ==
The shuihu or shui hu (Note: The Unschuld translation uses the form shui hu. The form shuihu is employed by a Japanologist and a Sinologist, though the latter concerns shuihu that dwell in the human body and "like to eat mercury".) (Chinese: 水虎, 'water tiger') is described as being "about the size of a three- or four-year old (human) child", with a head like a tiger's, (Note: Literally it only actually states "resembling children aged three to four years" in the Bencao Gangmu, but the extrapolation has been made that this concerns the size or "being shaped like a child".) and a shell like that of the pangolin. (Note: The Bencao gangmu in its entry for shuihu refers to the pangolin as the 綾鯉 (línglǐ), which literally can be translated to mean "hill carp". This explains why it is stated as "carp" rather than "pangolin" in one translated paper. The Bencao gangmu has its own entry on the 綾鯉 (línglǐ), where it is noted that the beast is also known as 穿山甲 (chuānshānjiǎ, pronounced senzankō in Japanese, which is the common modern term. The Kō yamato honzō (広大和本草) forcibly reads "鯪鯉 as senzankō, while the illustrator Sekien used the form 綾鯉 (línglǐ, ryōri) also forcibly read as senzankō).) Their knees, which are also tiger-like, may be visible above water, but their claws always remain submerged, despite their habit of lying on sandy riverbanks and basking in the sun in autumn. (Note: Unschuld parses (punctuates) the text as "膝頭似虎，掌爪..", "Their knees and their heads resemble those of tigers; their claws" (whereas past Japanese scholarship decided their "knee-heads (knee-caps) resembled tiger-forepaw-claws", cf. infra.). Unschuld did not bother to distinguish forepaw-claw.)

Information about the Suiko became widely known through its inclusion in the Ming Dynasty pharmacopoeia, the Bencao gangmu (Compendium of Materia Medica; specifically volume 42 of the Siku Quanshu edition). The description quotes the original source Xiang mian ji (襄沔記, 'Records of Xiang Mian'; 8th century). A similar description can be found in the 6th-century Commentary on the Water Classic (Note: simplified Chinese: 水经注; traditional Chinese: 水經注; pinyin: Shuǐ Jīng Zhù.) as quoted in the 17th century Ming Period dictionary, Tongya, where it is stated that the shuihu is also known as shuǐtáng (水唐) or shuǐlú (水盧); however, the form shuǐtáng may be unique to the Tongya.

=== Alternative reading ===
The description of the suiko in the Bencao Gangmu has been interpreted quite differently in Japan. In the past, a dissident reading was given for the passage in the Chinese source Bencao Gangmu, particularly among Japanese sources. The Osaka physician Terashima Ryōan, in his Wakan Sansai Zue (1712), interpreted the text to read "its knee-cap resembles that of a tiger's forepaw claws", and this reading has persisted in Japanese literature on the suiko into the present-day.

The accompanying woodcut in the Wakan Sansai Zue (figure top right) illustrated this (the tiger-claw kneecap) as well. The artist Toriyama Sekien, who consulted Terashima's encyclopedia, (Note: "Suiko, Water-Tiger.. His illustration is new but the description paraphrases the one in the Illustrated Sino-Japanese Encyclopedia of the Three Realms [=Wakan sansai zue]".) also drew the creature with the claws on the knees, with the caption: "..its kneecaps are sharp like tiger claws".

== Geography ==
According to the quote from the Xiang mian ji, the shuihu inhabits the confluence where the river Shu (涑水) (Note: The identity of the River Shu here is uncertain. There is a river Shu mentioned in the Commentary on the Water Classic but that likely different, since that river is situated in Wenxi County in what is now Shanxi Province.) meets the river Mian (沔水) (now known as the Han River) in Zhonglu County, (Note: simplified Chinese: 中庐县; traditional Chinese: 中廬縣; pinyin: Zhōnglú Xiàn.) in today's Xiangzhou District, Hubei Province.

== Pharmacological use ==
The original text found in the Bencao Gangmu states that, if the shuihu is caught alive, then the harvested nose can be "used for some trifles". The part of the anatomy in question is not referred to as the nose (鼻, bí) but as the bíyàn (simplified Chinese: 鼻厌; traditional Chinese: 鼻厭) in the Tongya text, (Note: Also written as gāoyàn (simplified Chinese: 皋厌; traditional Chinese: 皋厭) in the unrectified text.) further explained to be the yīn (陰) or the "force" (Chinese: 勢, shì) of the beast. In reference to the shuihu, the harvest of this body part has been glossed as "castration", (Note: "Removing gāoyàn which is castration 摘皋厭은 勢去"（normally the inverted form 去勢 is "castration"）.) namely, the removal of its genitals, as one newspaper has more bluntly put it. (Note: It is not an obscure reference that the term yīn (陰) could imply or denote the genitalia, and it is one of the dictionary definitions, but the term yīn (as in yin-yang) carries a variety of meanings.) It is also stated that the part can be applied as an aphrodisiac (媚藥, mèiyào).

=== Trifle use ===
The term xiaoshi (小使), which has been literally rendered as "used for some trifles" in translation, actually refers to some aspect of sexuality or reproduction (bodily fluid), according to sources. More specifically, this term xiaoshi (lit. 'small use') is glossed as a synonym of xiaotong (小通, lit. 'small avenue/path') in the Zhengzitong (正字通, Zhèngzìtōng) dictionary, among other sources, and one instance of the usage of "small avenue" occurs in a poem in the Han shi waizhuan, where it is sung that the male's "small avenue" reaches sexual maturity at age 16, and the female's at age 14. (Note: As pointed out in Ono Ranzan's commentary on the shuihu. The same gloss (indication of synonym), and poem example also occurs in the Tongya, though in another book not specifically connected with the shuihu.) (Note: In an English translation of this poem, the male's "small avenue" is rendered as "semen", and the female's as "her [bodily] fluids".)

=== Taming ===
There are alternative interpretations, where instead of pharmacological use, the live specimen becomes a tamed or trained beast with the removal or manipulation of the body part.

One interpretation of the statement is that, when the genitals are removed from the beast, it becomes tame or docile, much like the spaying or neutering of dogs and cats. The Wakan Sansai Zue interpreted this passage of Chinese text to mean that if a person pinches (摘まむ, tsumamu) the nose, the beast turns into a servant (小使, kozukai). (Note: The historical kana" given in the original is コツカヒ"; the modern form is "コヅカイ".)

== Suiko in Japan ==
The Japanese interpretation of the suiko according to their reading of the Chinese pharmacopeia was already discussed above (§ Alternative reading).

=== Distinguished from kappa ===
Terashima Ryōan in his 18th century Wakan Sansai Zue stated that the suiko was similar to the kawatarō (western name for kappa (Note: The Butsurui shōko (1775) explains that kawatarō, or so the creature is known in either Kinai (part of modern Kansai) or Kyūshū, is known as kappa in the east, and this is a truncated form of kawa-wappa. Cf. local historian Prof. Mataji Miyamoto who states that what was called kappa in Edo was called gatarō (河太郎; がたろう) in Osaka.) (Note: Terashima Ryōan was a physician based in Osaka, and he uses the term kawatarō (川太郎; かハたらう) used in the west.)), but differing from it. Thus thus Ryōan demarcated the suiko and kawatarō entries as separate (though adjacent).

The artist Sekien, who followed after this encyclopedia, also illustrated the two creatures separately. (Note: "Although [suiko] is often treated as a variation of the kappa, Sekien breaks it out into its own entry here".)

Earlier, Kaibara Ekken in his Yamato honzō (大和本草) (pub. 1709) had distinguished the kappa/kawatarō and the suiko as "mutually similar but not the same", and the Wakan Sansai Zue followed that path.

An awareness of the differences is also demonstrated by Ono Ranzan in his Honzō Kōmoku Keimō (本草綱目啓蒙, Enlightenment on the Compendium of Materia Medica). Ranzan primarily describes the Japanese kappa (love of sumo is obviously Japanese) in the main text, while relegating quoted information about the Chinese Suiko to footnotes.

=== As synonym for kappa ===
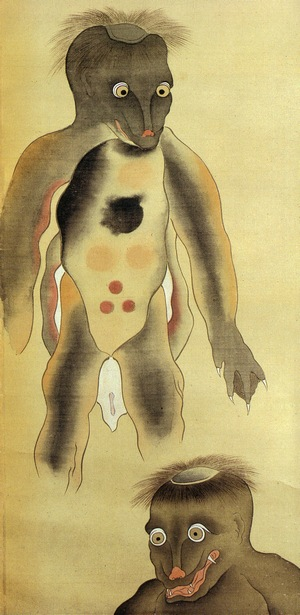
"Suiko" (depicting a kappa) supposedly captured in Hita, Bungo Province during the Kan'ei era (1624–1644).

But in Japan, the word suiko (shuihu) was frequently also used as synonym for kappa. even though it is far from clear if the shuihu of China and the kappa of Japan can be regarded as sharing a common origin.

Examples of synonymous treatment can be found in the physician Kurokawa Dōyū's Enpekiken ki (遠碧軒記) or Yamazaki Yoshinari's Sanyō zakki (三養雑記).

A number of literature on the kappa bearing suiko in the title also appeared that included paintings of allegedly captured kappa such as:

- Suiko-no-zu (水虎之図; lit. "Suiko Diagram", Kansei to Tenpō era/1789–1830)
- Suiko setsu (水虎説; lit. "Discourse on the Suiko"; A Study of Water Tigers c. Bunsei 3・1820)
- Suiko kōryaku (水虎考略; lit. "Brief Study of the suiko", Bunsei 3/1820; copy made Tenpō 7/1836).
- Suiko jūnihin no zu (水虎十二品之図; lit. "Illustration of 12 specimens of suiko", first pub. c. 1850?). (Note: Expanded after Suiko kōryaku and other sources.)

Similarly, the sections "Ōmi Suiko-go / Hizen Suiko-go" (Tales of the Suiko of Ōmi / Hizen) in Yanagihara Norimitsu's Kansō Jigo (閑窓自語) simply use the kanji "水虎" (Suiko) to refer to the Kappa of Lake Biwa and Kyushu.

This usage can even be found in the folklore collected in the modern day from various regions, including Tōhoku and Kyushu. The Suijin worship known as Suiko-sama) found in Aomori Prefecture is another example of the term's repurposed usage.

In parts of Aomori Prefecture, the kappa have been deified and enshrined by the name of suiko-sama.

== See also ==
- Underwater panther
- Kappa (folklore)
- Enkō (folklore)
- Kenmun
