= Yōkai =

Supernatural beings from Japanese folklore

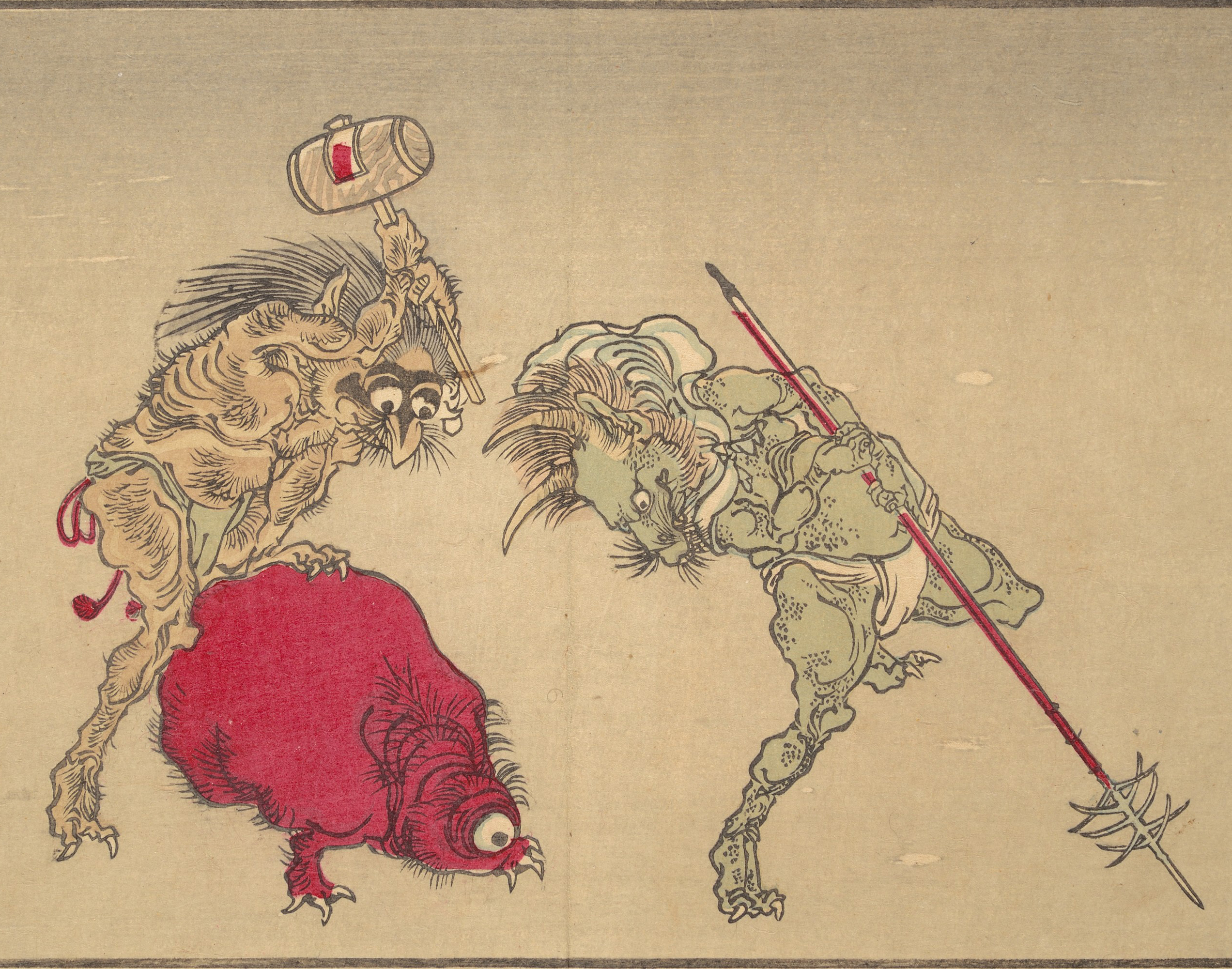
A yōkai print by Kawanabe Kyōsai

Yōkai (妖怪; Japanese pronunciation: [joː.kai]) are a class of supernatural entities and spirits in Japanese folklore. Yōkai are a vast range of beings, including shapeshifters, ghosts, demons, and tricksters. They can be mischievous, helpful, or malevolent, often appearing as animal-like figures, possessed objects, or humanoids. They embody the mysterious and uncanny aspects of nature and human emotions.

Yōkai are also referred to as ayakashi (あやかし), mononoke (物の怪) or mamono (魔物). Some academics and Shinto practitioners acknowledge similarities within the seeming dichotomy between the natures of yōkai and most kami, which are generally regarded as relatively beneficent in comparison, and class the two as ultimately the same type of spirits of nature or of a mythological realm. Their behavior can range from malevolent or mischievous to benevolent towards humans.

Yōkai often have animal-like features (such as the kappa, depicted as appearing similar to a turtle, and the tengu, commonly depicted with wings), but may also appear humanoid in appearance, such as the kuchisake-onna (口裂け女). Some yōkai resemble inanimate objects (such as the tsukumogami), while others have no discernible shape. Yōkai are typically described as having spiritual or supernatural abilities, with shapeshifting being the most common trait associated with them. Yōkai that shapeshift are known as bakemono (化け物) or obake (お化け).

Japanese folklorists and historians, such as Michael Foster, describe yōkai as part of how humans "fashion from a perilous landscape something concrete [...] the naming of yōkai identifies the threat, specifying the nature of the danger..." In the Edo period (1603 to 1868), many artists, such as Toriyama Sekien (1712-1788), invented new yōkai by taking inspiration from folktales or purely from their imagination. Today, several such yōkai (such as the amikiri) are mistakenly thought to originate in more traditional folklore.

The kanji representation of the word yōkai comprises two characters that both mean "suspicious, doubtful", and while the Japanese name is simply the Japanese transliteration or pronunciation of the Chinese term yāoguài (which designates similarly strange creatures), some Japanese commentators argue that the word yōkai has taken on many different meanings in Japanese culture, including referring to a large number of uniquely Japanese creatures.

== Concept ==
The concept of yōkai varies greatly throughout Japanese culture and historical periods; typically, the older the time period, the higher the number of phenomena deemed to be supernatural and the result of yōkai. According to Japanese ideas of animism, spirit-like entities were believed to reside in all things, including natural phenomena and objects. Such spirits possessed emotions and personalities: peaceful spirits were known as nigi-mitama, who brought good fortune; violent spirits, known as ara-mitama, brought ill fortune, such as illness and natural disasters. Neither type of spirit was considered to be yōkai.

One's ancestors and particularly respected departed elders could also be deemed to be nigi-mitama, accruing status as protective spirits who brought fortune to those who worshiped them. Animals, objects and natural features or phenomena were also venerated as nigi-mitama or propitiated as ara-mitama depending on the area.

Rituals for converting ara-mitama into nigi-mitama were performed, aiming to quell malevolent spirits, prevent misfortune and alleviate the fear arising from phenomena and events that otherwise had no explanation. The ritual for converting ara-mitama into nigi-mitama was known as the chinkon (鎮魂, lit. 'the calming of the spirits' or 'requiem'). Chinkon rituals for ara-mitama that failed to achieve deification as benevolent spirits, whether through a lack of sufficient veneration or through losing worshippers and thus their divinity, became yōkai.

Over time, phenomena and events thought to be supernatural became fewer and fewer, with the depictions of yōkai in picture scrolls and paintings beginning to standardize, evolving more into caricatures than fearsome spiritual entities. Elements of the tales and legends surrounding yōkai began to be depicted in public entertainment, beginning as early as the Middle Ages in Japan. During and following the Edo period, the mythology and lore of yōkai became more defined and formalized.

In Japan before the Meiji period, supernatural beings were rarely referred to as yōkai. Most of the supernatural entities known as yōkai today were instead called by other names, such as oni or bakemono, during the pre-Meiji era. The reason the word yōkai has become the standard term for supernatural beings in modern Japan used both academically and in everyday language is due to a Meiji-era scholar named Inoue Enryō (Japanese: 井上 円了). He established an academic discipline called yōkaigaku (yōkaiology) in an effort to eradicate superstitions surrounding them.

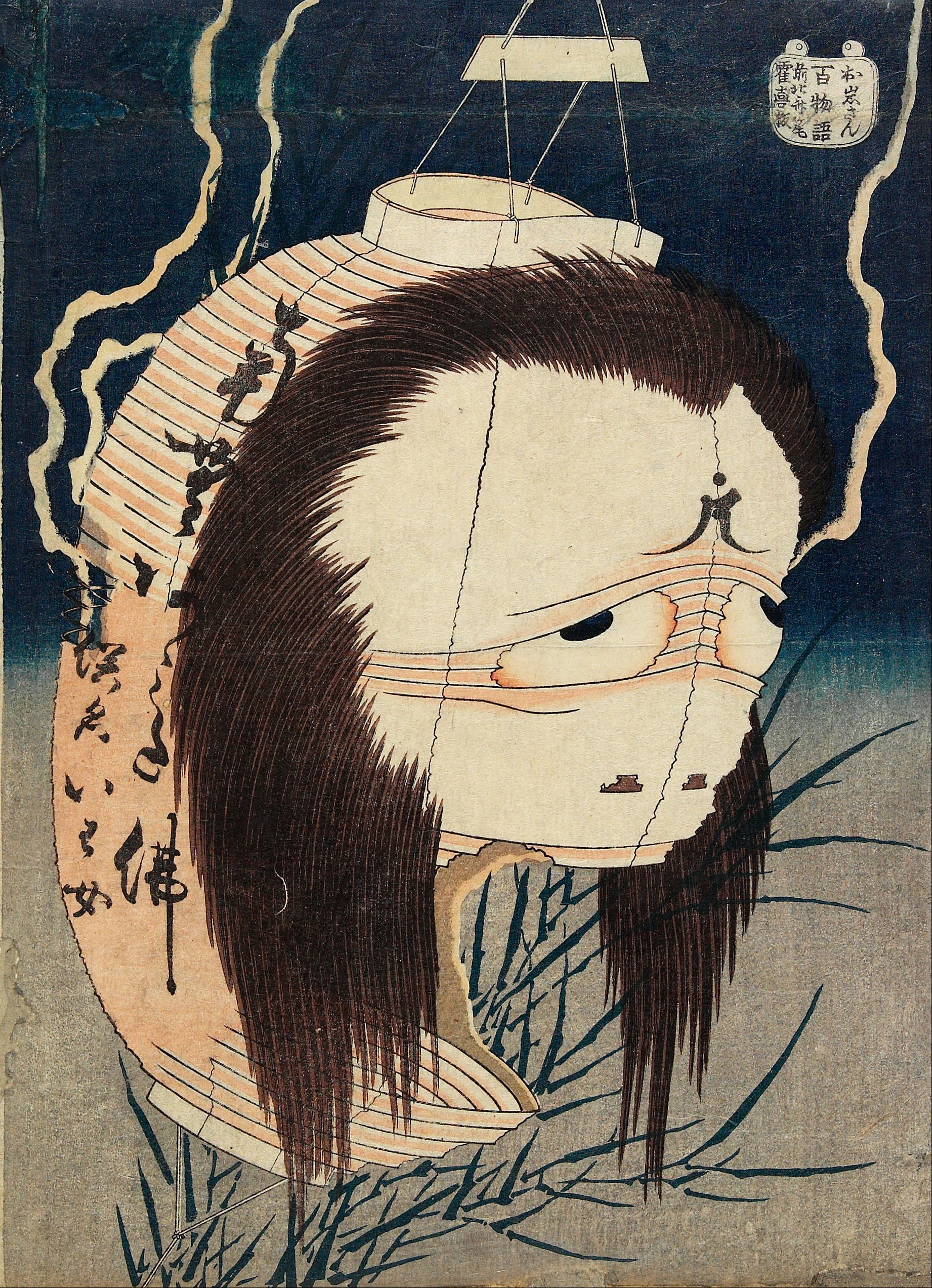
Chōchin-oiwa by Katsushika Hokusai

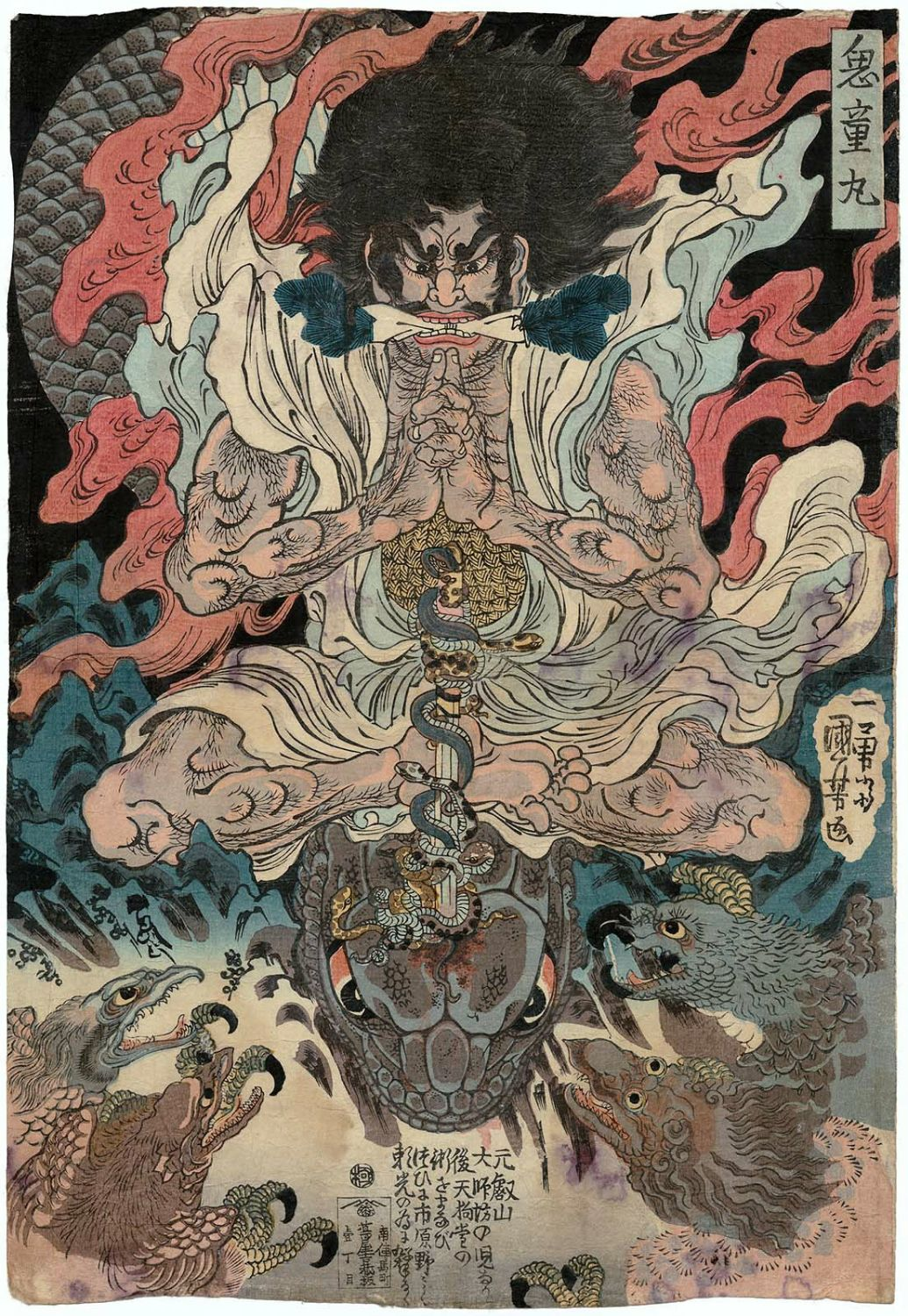
Kidōmaru by Utagawa Kuniyoshi

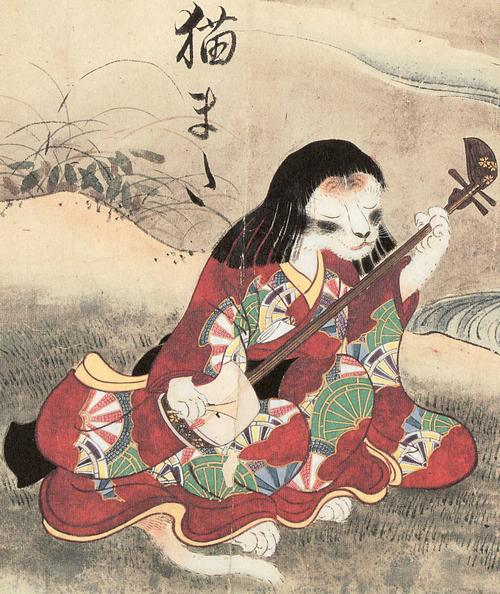
Nekomata from the Hyakkai Zukan by Sawaki Suushi

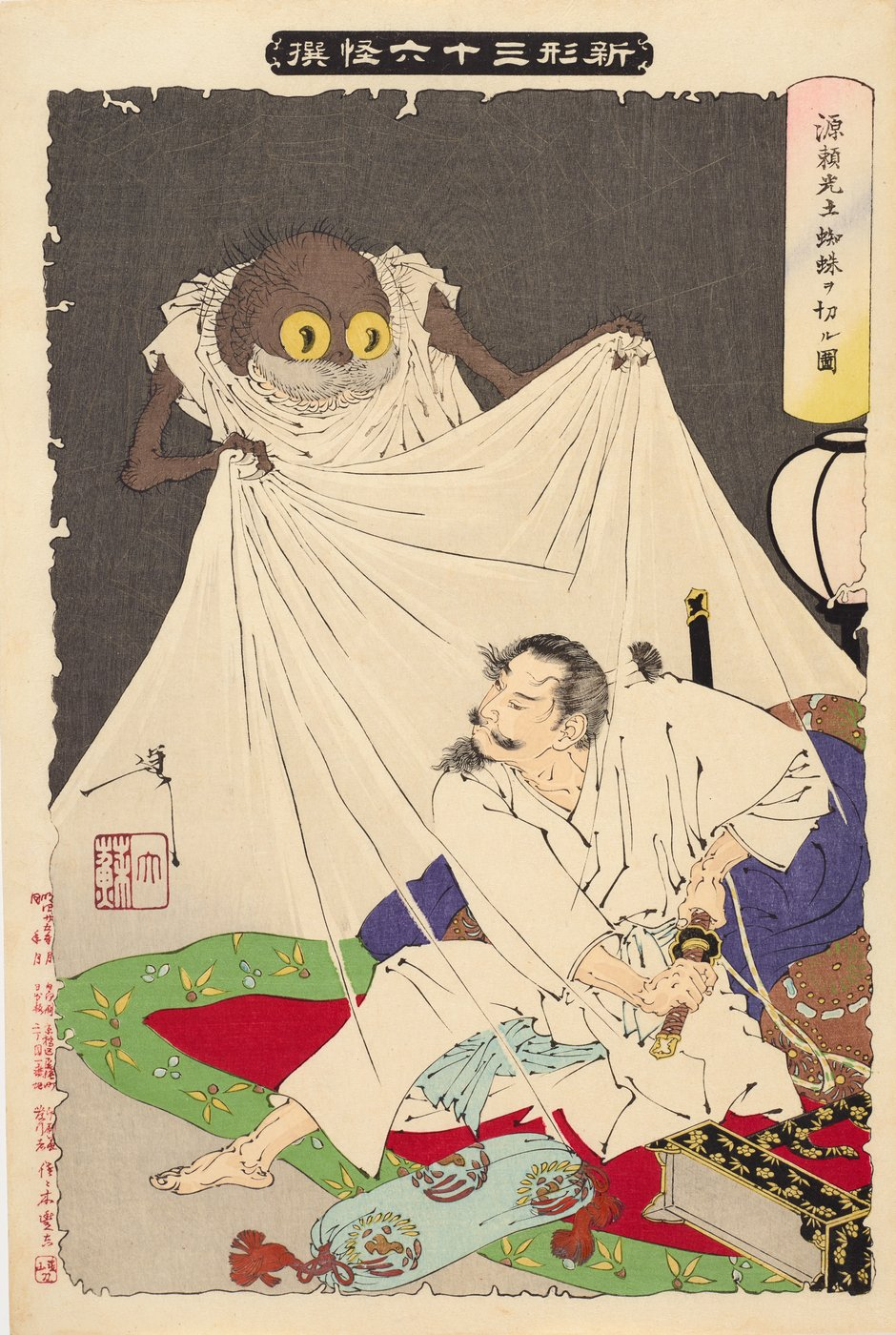
Tsuchigumo from the Shinkei Sanjurokkai Sen (新形三十六怪撰) by Tsukioka Yoshitoshi

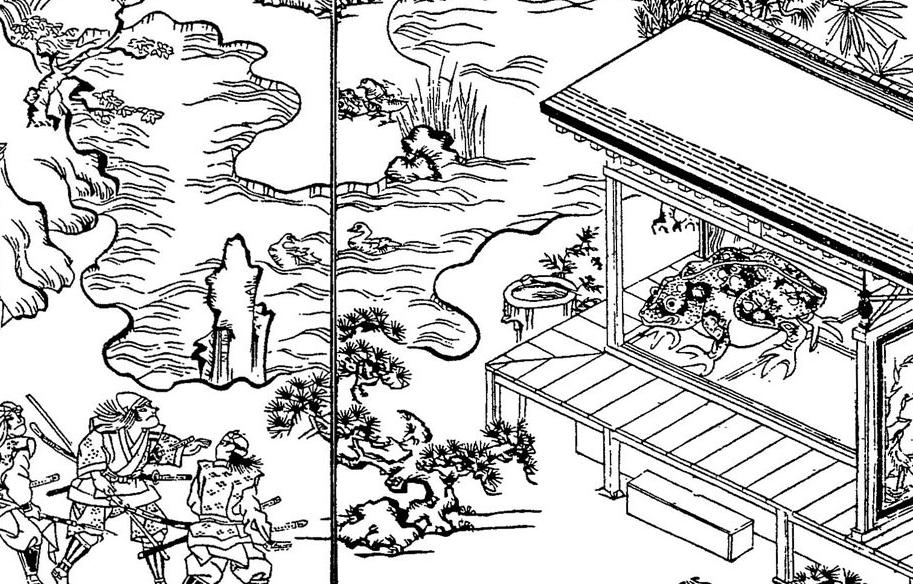
Gama Yōkai from the Saigama to Ukiyo Soushi Kenkyu Volume 2, special issue Kaii Tamababaki

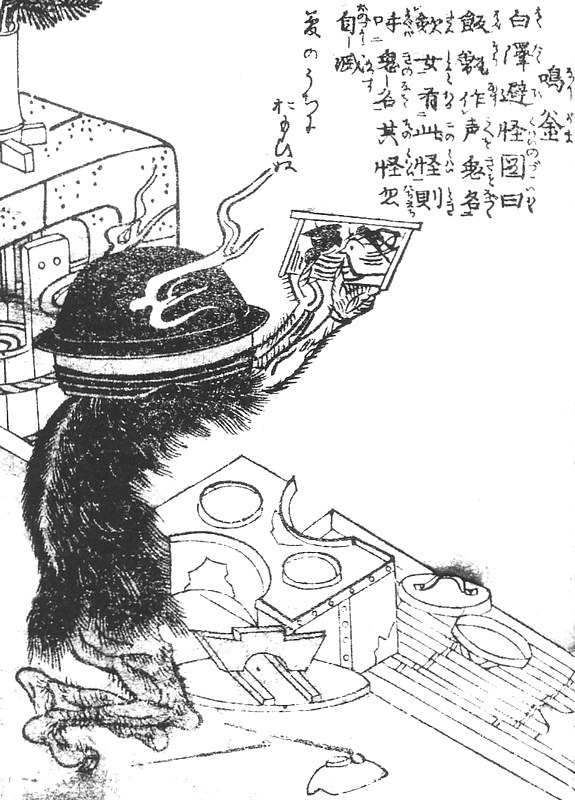
Narikama from the Gazu Hyakki Tsurezure Bukuro by Sekien Toriyama

Theatre Curtain with Yokai by Kawanabe Kyōsai (1880)

== Types ==
The folklorist Tsutomu Ema studied the literature and paintings depicting yōkai and henge (変化, lit. 'changed things/mutants'), dividing them into categories as presented in the Nihon Yōkai Henge Shi and the Obake no Rekishi:

- Categories based on a yōkai's "true form":
  - Human
  - Animal
  - Plant
  - Object
  - Natural phenomenon
- Categories depending on the source of mutation:
  - Mutation related to this world
  - Spiritual or mentally related mutation
  - Reincarnation or afterworld related mutation
  - Material related mutation
- Categories based on external appearance:
  - Human
  - Animal
  - Plant
  - Artifact
  - Structure or building
  - Natural object or phenomenon
  - Miscellaneous or appearance compounding more than one category

In other folklorist categorizations, yōkai are classified, similarly to the nymphs of Greek mythology, by their location or the phenomena associated with their manifestation. Yōkai are indexed in the book Sogo Nihon Minzoku Goi (綜合日本民俗語彙, A Complete Dictionary of Japanese Folklore) (Note: The index has the heading reikai (霊怪; "spirits and monsters"), under which reikai (霊怪), yōkai (妖怪), tsukimono (憑物; "possession by spirits").) as follows:

- dōbutsu no ke (動物の怪; animals, either real or imaginary)
- ki no ke (木の怪; trees)
- michi no ke (道の怪; paths)
- mizu no ke (水の怪; water)
- oto no ke (音の怪; sound)
- umi no ke (海の怪; the sea)
- yama no ke (山の怪; mountains)
- yuki no ke (雪の怪; snow)

== History ==
=== Ancient history ===
- 772 CE: In the Shoku Nihongi, there is the statement "Shinto purification is performed because yōkai appear very often in the imperial court," using the word yōkai to not refer to any one phenomenon in particular, but to strange phenomena in general.
- Middle of the Heian period (794–1185/1192): In The Pillow Book by Sei Shōnagon, there is the statement "there are tenacious mononoke," as well as a statement by Murasaki Shikibu that "the mononoke have become quite dreadful," which are the first appearances of the word mononoke.
- 1370: In the Taiheiki, in the fifth volume, there is the statement, "Sagami no Nyudo was not at all frightened by yōkai."

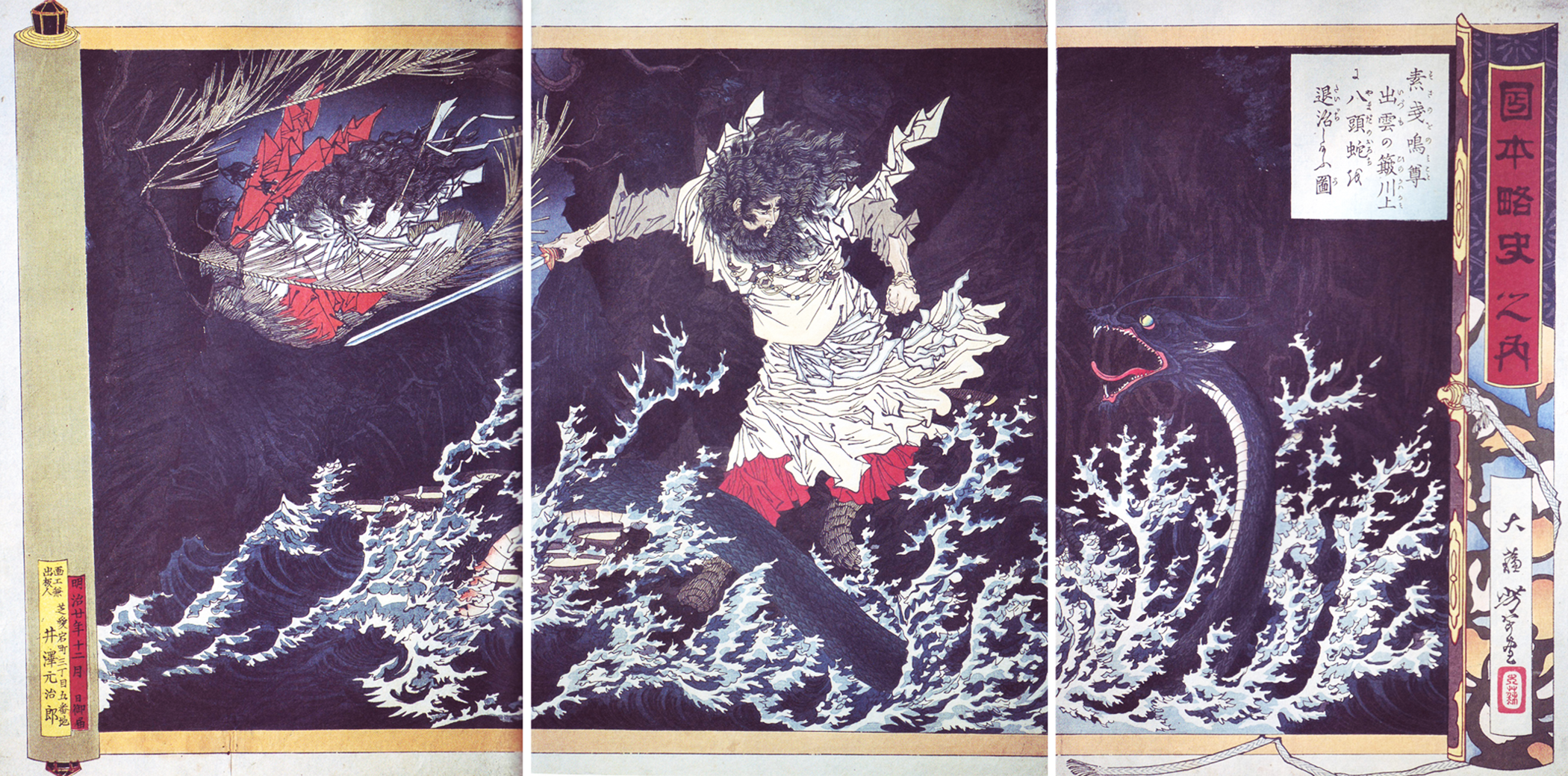
Yamata no Orochi from the Nihon-ryakushi: Susanoo by Tsukioka Yoshitoshi

The ancient times were a period abundant in literature and folktales mentioning and explaining yōkai. Literature such as the Kojiki, the Nihon Shoki, and various Fudoki expositioned on legends from the ancient past, and mentions of oni, orochi, among other kinds of mysterious phenomena can already be seen in them. In the Heian period, collections of stories about yōkai and other supernatural phenomena were published in multiple volumes, starting with publications such as the Nihon Ryōiki and the Konjaku Monogatarishū, and in these publications, mentions of phenomena such as Hyakki Yagyō can be seen.

The yōkai that appear in this literature were passed on to later generations. Despite the literature mentioning and explaining these yōkai, they were never given any visual depictions. In Buddhist paintings such as the Hell Scroll (Nara National Museum), which came from the later Heian period, there are visual expressions of the idea of oni, but actual visual depictions would only come later in the Middle Ages, from the Kamakura period and beyond.

Yamata no Orochi was originally a local god but turned into a yōkai who was slain by Susanoo. Yasaburo was originally a bandit whose vengeful spirit (onryō) turned into a poisonous snake upon death and plagued the water in a paddy, but eventually became deified as the "wisdom god of the well." Kappa and inugami are sometimes treated as gods in one area and yōkai in other areas. From these examples, it can be seen that among Japanese gods, there are some beings that can go from god to yōkai and vice versa.

=== Post-classical history ===
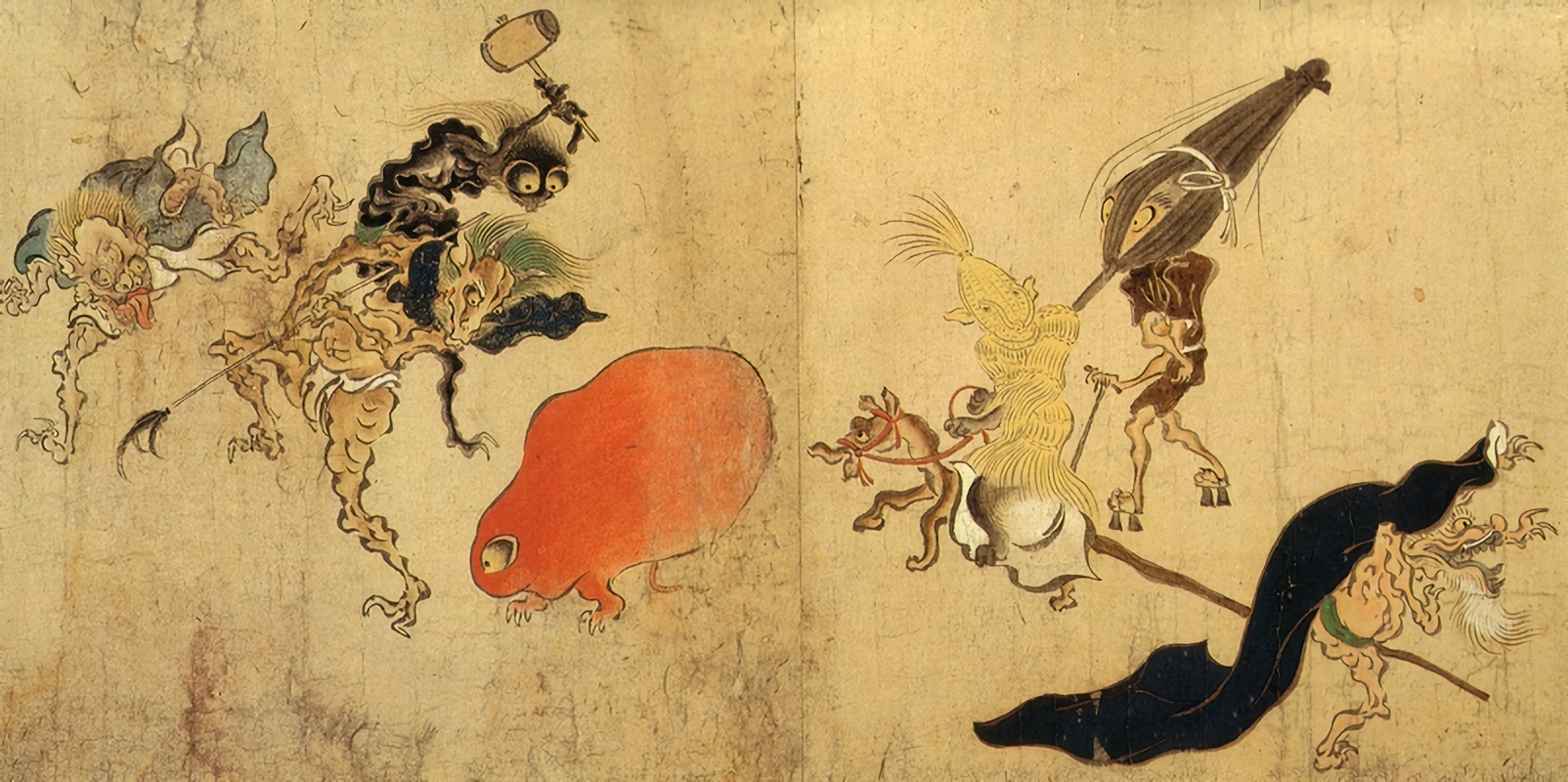
The Hyakki Yagyo Emaki, author unknown, Muromachi period

Medieval Japan was a time period where publications such as emakimono, Otogi-zōshi, and other visual depictions of yōkai started to appear. While there were religious publications such as the Jisha Engi (寺社縁起), others, such as the Otogizōshi, were intended more for entertainment, starting the trend where yōkai became more and more seen as subjects of entertainment. For examples, tales of yōkai extermination could be said to be a result of emphasizing the superior status of human society over yōkai. Publications included:

- The Ooe-yama Shuten-doji Emaki (about an oni), the Zegaibou Emaki (about a tengu), the Tawara no Tōda emaki (俵藤太絵巻) (concerning serpent/dragon-folk oppressed by a giant centipede yōkai), the Tsuchigumo Zoshi (土蜘蛛草紙) (about tsuchigumo), and the Dojo-ji Engi Emaki (about a giant snake). These emaki were about yōkai that come from even older times.
- The Kitano Tenjin Engi Emaki, in which Sugawara no Michizane was a lightning god who took on the form of an oni, and despite attacking people after doing this, he was still deified as a god in the end.
- The Junirui Emaki, the Tamamono Soshi, (both about Tamamo-no-Mae), and the Fujibukuro Soushi Emaki (about a monkey). These emaki told of yōkai mutations of animals.
- The Tsukumogami Emaki, which told tales of thrown away, not-too-precious objects that come to have a spirit residing in them planning evil deeds against humans, and ultimately get exorcised and sent to peace.
- The Hyakki Yagyō Emaki, depicting many different kinds of yōkai all marching together

In this way, yōkai that were mentioned only in writing were given a visual appearance in the Middle Ages. In the Otogizōshi, familiar tales such as Urashima Tarō and Issun-bōshi also appeared.

The next major change in yōkai came after the period of warring states, in the Edo period.

=== Modern history ===
==== Edo period ====
- 1677: Publication of the Shokoku Hyakumonogatari, a collection of tales of various monsters.
- 1706: Publication of the Otogi Hyakumonogatari. In volumes such as Miyazu no Ayakashi (volume 1) and Unpin no Yōkai (volume 4), collections of tales that seem to come from China were adapted into a Japanese setting.
- 1712: Publication of the Wakan Sansai Zue by Terajima Ryōan, a collection of tales based on the Chinese Sancai Tuhui.
- 1716: In the specialized dictionary Sesetsu Kojien (世説故事苑), there is an entry on yōkai, which states, "Among the commoners in my society, there are many kinds of kaiji (mysterious phenomena), often mispronounced by commoners as 'kechi.' Types include the cry of weasels, the howling of foxes, the bustling of mice, the rising of the chicken, the cry of the birds, the pooping of the birds on clothing, and sounds similar to voices that come from cauldrons and bottles. These types of things appear in the Shōseiroku, methods of exorcising them can be seen, so it should serve as a basis."
- 1788: Publication of the Bakemono chakutocho by Masayoshi Kitao. This was a kibyoshi diagram book of yōkai, but it was prefaced with the statement "it can be said that the so-called yōkai in our society is a representation of our feelings that arise from fear," and already in this era, while yōkai were being researched, it indicated that there were people who questioned whether yōkai really existed or not.

It was in this era that the technology of the printing press and publication was first started to be widely used, that a publishing culture developed, and was frequently a subject of kibyoshi and other publications. (Note: Picture books classed as a kusazōshi included further subcategories named after the colors of their jackets. A kibyōshi (yellow) referred to those catering to adult audiences; there were also akabyōshi (red) and aobyōshi (blue).)

As a result, kashi-hon shops that handled such books spread and became widely used, making the general public's impression of each yōkai fixed, spreading throughout Japan. For example, before the Edo period, there were plenty of interpretations about what the yōkai were that were classified as kappa, but because of books and publishing, the notion of kappa became anchored to what is now the modern notion of kappa.

Also, including other kinds of publications, other than yōkai born from folk legend, there were also many invented yōkai that were created through puns or word plays; the Gazu Hyakki Yagyō by Toriyama Sekien is one example. When the Hyakumonogatari Kaidankai became popular in the Edo period, it is thought that one reason for the appearance of new yōkai was a demand for entertaining ghost stories about yōkai no one has ever heard of before, resulting in some that were simply made up for the purpose of telling an entertaining story. The kasa-obake and the tōfu-kozō are known examples of these.

They are also frequently depicted in ukiyo-e, and there are artists that have drawn famous yōkai like Utagawa Kuniyoshi, Yoshitoshi, Kawanabe Kyōsai, and Hokusai, and there are also Hyakki Yagyō books made by artists of the Kanō school.

In this period, toys and games like karuta and sugoroku frequently used yōkai as characters. Thus, with the development of a publishing culture, yōkai depictions that were treasured in temples and shrines were able to become something more familiar to people, and it is thought that this is the reason that even though yōkai were originally things to be feared, they have then become characters that people feel close to.

==== Meiji and Taishō periods ====
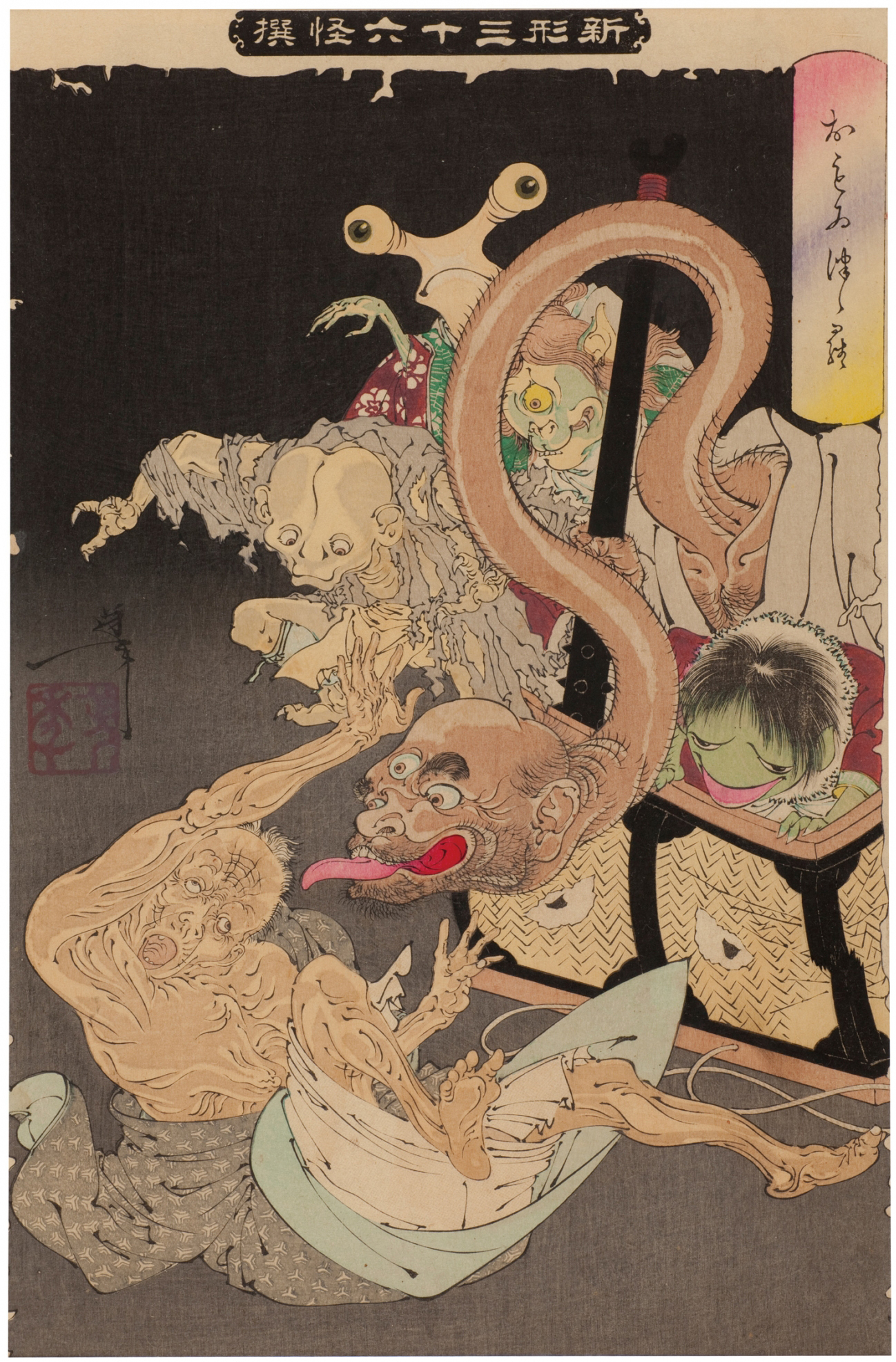
The Heavy Basket from the Shinkei Sanjurokkei Sen by Tsukioka Yoshitoshi, 1892

- 1891: Publication of the Seiyuu Youkai Kidan by Shibue Tamotsu. It introduced folktales from Europe, such as the Grimm Tales.
- 1896: Publication of the Yōkaigaku Kogi by Inoue Enryō
- 1900: Performance of the kabuki play Yami no Ume Hyakumonogatari at the Kabuki-za in January. It was a performance in which appeared numerous yōkai such as the Kasa ippon ashi, skeletons, yuki-onna, osakabe-hime, among others. Onoe Kikugorō V played the role of many of these, such as the osakabe-hime.
- 1914: Publication of the Shokubutsu Kaiko by Mitsutaro Shirai. Shirai expounded on plant yōkai from the point of view of a plant pathologist and herbalist.

With the Meiji Restoration, Western ideas and translated Western publications began to make an impact, and Western tales were particularly sought after. Things like binbōgami, yakubyōgami, and shinigami were talked about, and shinigami were even depicted in classical rakugo. Although the shinigami were misunderstood as a kind of Japanese yōkai or kami, they actually became well known among the populace through a rakugo called Shinigami by San'yūtei Enchō, which were adoptions of European tales such as the Grimm fairy tale "Godfather Death" and the Italian opera Crispino e la comare (1850). Also, in 1908, Kyōka Izumi and Chikufū Tobari jointly translated Gerhart Hauptmann's play The Sunken Bell. Later works of Kyōka such as Yasha ga Ike were influenced by The Sunken Bell, and so it can be seen that folktales that come from the West became adapted into Japanese tales of yōkai.

==== Shōwa period ====
Since yōkai have been introduced in various kinds of media, they have become well known among people from all walks of life. The kamishibai from before the war, the manga industry, kashi-hon shops that continued to exist until around the 1970s, and television all contributed to the public knowledge and familiarity with yōkai. Yōkai play a role in attracting tourism and revitalizing local mecca regions such as Tōno in Iwate Prefecture (where stories in Kunio Yanagita's Tono Monogatari were collected) or Tottori Prefecture (Shigeru Mizuki's birthplace).

In this way, yōkai are spoken about in legends in various forms, but traditional oral storytelling by the elders and the older people is rare, and regionally unique situations and backgrounds in oral storytelling are not easily conveyed. For example, the classical yōkai represented by tsukumogami can only be felt as something realistic by living close to nature, such as with tanuki (Japanese raccoon dogs), foxes and weasels. Furthermore, in the suburbs and other regions, even when living in a primary-sector environment, there are tools that are no longer seen, such as the inkstone, the kama (a large cooking pot), or the tsurube (a bucket used for getting water from a well), and there exist yōkai that are reminiscent of old lifestyles, such as the azukiarai and the dorotabō.

On the other hand, the yōkai introduced through mass media are not limited to only those that come from classical sources like folklore, and just as in the Edo period, new fictional yōkai continue to be invented, such as scary school stories and other urban legends like kuchisake-onna and Hanako-san, giving birth to new yōkai. From 1975 onwards, starting with the popularity of kuchisake-onna, these urban legends began to be referred to in mass media as "modern yōkai." This terminology was also used in recent publications dealing with urban legends, and the researcher on yōkai, Bintarō Yamaguchi, used this especially frequently.

During the 1970s, many books were published that introduced yōkai through encyclopedias, illustrated reference books, and dictionaries as a part of children's horror books, but along with the yōkai that come from classics like folklore, Kaidan, and essays, it has been pointed out by modern research that there are some mixed in that do not come from classics, but were newly created. Some well-known examples of these are the gashadokuro and the jubokko. For example, Arifumi Sato is known to be a creator of modern yōkai, and Shigeru Mizuki, a manga artist of yōkai, in writings concerning research about yōkai, pointed out that newly created yōkai do exist, and Mizuki himself, through GeGeGe no Kitaro, created about 30 new yōkai.

There has been much criticism that this mixing of classical yōkai with newly created yōkai is making light of tradition and legends. However, since there have already been those from the Edo period like Sekien Toriyama who created many new yōkai, there is also the opinion that it is unreasonable to criticize modern creations without doing the same for classical creations too. Furthermore, there is a favorable view that says that introducing various yōkai characters through these books nurtured creativity and emotional development of young readers of the time.

== Comparison with yaoguai ==
Both the Chinese yaoguai (Chinese: 妖怪; pinyin: yāoguài) and Japanese yōkai include strange, supernatural beings with shapeshifting tendencies. In the Chinese version, the emphasis is often on the first character, 妖 (yāo, yō), which connotes bewilderment, enchantment, or supernatural affliction — for example, their ability to take on human form in order to seduce and to enthrall human beings. In Japanese yōkai, the emphasis appears to be on the 怪 (guài, kai), referring to their monstrous and aberrant nature and anatomy. Depictions of Japanese yōkai in popular culture often include elements of the cute, the comical, the goofy, and the bizarre.

Some creatures appear as both Chinese yaoguai and Japanese yōkai, such as the scaly "water tiger" 水虎 (shuǐhǔ, suiko), the wilderness demons 魑魅魍魎 (chīmèi wǎngliǎng, chimimōryō), and the nine-tailed foxes 九尾狐 (jiǔwěihú, kyūbiko; also called 九尾の狐 (kyūbi no kitsune) in Japanese).

Some yōkai, such as the nekomata (cat yōkai) and tanuki (raccoon yōkai), resemble Chinese yaoguai, which encompass any number of shapeshifting animals and plants that have learnt to cultivate human form and other supernatural arts. For example, the nekomata resembles the Chinese xiānlí (仙狸, 'leopard cat immortal'; Japanese: senri).

Yet others are uniquely Japanese, such as the kappa, ambivalent and occasionally cute, the haradashi, with its belly on its face, and the mumashika, a comical-looking yokai with a horse head and a deer body.

== In popular culture ==
Yōkai are often referred to as Japanese spirits or East Asian ghosts, like the Hanako-san legend or the story of the "Slit-mouthed girl," both of which hail from Japanese legend. The term yōkai can also be interpreted as something strange or unusual.

Lafcadio Hearn's collection of Japanese ghost stories entitled Kwaidan: Stories and Studies of Strange Things includes stories of yūrei and yōkai such as Yuki-onna, and is one of the first Western publications of its kind.

Yōkai remain prevalent in modern works of fiction. Shigeru Mizuki, the manga creator of such series as GeGeGe no Kitaro and Kappa no Sanpei, keeps yōkai in the popular imagination. Other popular works focusing on yōkai include the Nurarihyon no Mago series, Yu Yu Hakusho, Inuyasha: A Feudal Fairy Tale, Yo-kai Watch and the 1960s Yokai Monsters film series, which was loosely remade in 2005 as Takashi Miike's The Great Yokai War and more recently Yukinobu Tatsu's Dandadan and the video games Genshin Impact, Phasmophobia and Nioh series. In Touhou Project by Jun'ya "ZUN" Ōta, Yōkai make up a majority of the characters as well.

== See also ==
Japanese supernatural beings

- Kappa – a type of yōkai
- Oni – a type of yōkai
- Tengu – a type of yōkai
- Yōsei – Spiritlike creature from Japanese folklore, distinct from the yōkai
- Yūrei – Figures in Japanese folklore similar to ghosts, distinct from the yōkai

Japanese museums on the supernatural

- Miyoshi Mononoke Museum
- Shodoshima Yokai Art Museum

Other supernatural beings from East Asian folklore

- Dokkaebi – Creatures from Korean folklore
- Ghosts in Chinese culture – Some Chinese ghosts are identical to the Japanese yūrei in character or nature
- Kijimunaa – Indigenous Ryukyuan belief system (legendary beings from the Ryukyu Islands)
- Mogui – A class of Chinese demons from Buddhism
- Yaoguai – A class of Chinese supernatural beings with shapeshifting abilities and other supernatural powers.

Lists of supernatural creatures from East Asian folklore

- List of legendary creatures from Japan – Legendary creatures and entities in traditional Japanese mythology
- List of supernatural beings in Chinese folklore – Legendary creatures and entities in Chinese folklore, many of which also recur in Japanese lore

Jinn - Supernatural beings in Middle Eastern culture and Islam
