= Terajima =

Terajima (written: 寺島 or 寺嶋; sometimes read Terashima) is a Japanese surname. Notable people with the surname include:

- Ken Terajima
- Shinobu Terajima (born 1972), Japanese actress
- Susumu Terajima (born 1963), Japanese actor
- Yuji Terajima (born 1974), Japanese manga artist
