= Shodoshima Yokai Art Museum =

Museum in Shodoshima

Yokai Art Museum
- Established: 2018
- Location: Tonoshō, Shōdoshima, Kagawa Prefecture, Japan
- Coordinates: 34°29′05″N 134°11′10″E
- Type: Art museum
- Director: Chubei Yagyu
- Website: yokaimuseum.on-the-trip.com/en.html

The Shodoshima Yokai Art Museum, also known as the Yokai Bijutsukan Art Museum is a small museum in Kagawa prefecture, Japan, which is focused on yōkai, supernatural entities in Japanese folklore.

== Description ==
The museum, directed by Yagyu Chuebi, contains approximately nine hundred examples of Yokai. The museum is located on Shodoshima island, in the area known as the "maze district", in four wooden structures from the Meiji Era. The collection consists of works by several artists some of which have been acquired through the Yokai Art Contest annually over the past decade.

The origins of yokai folklore go back to the 11th century. The 18th century artist and scholar, Toriyama Sekien, brought attention to yokai folklore through his illustrated encyclopedia of monsters. Yokai have been described as the human imagination at work to process "fear, awe, and anxiety toward nature and unknown presences that writhe within the darkness." Yōkai are mischievous creatures, sometimes considered demonic, that shed light on mysterious or unexplained phenomena, for example, damaging winds or noises in the night that cannot be explained. There are three basic types of yōkai, Obake who are usually depicted as shapeshifting monsters; Yurei, that are ghosts; and the more general Yōkai.

== Gallery ==
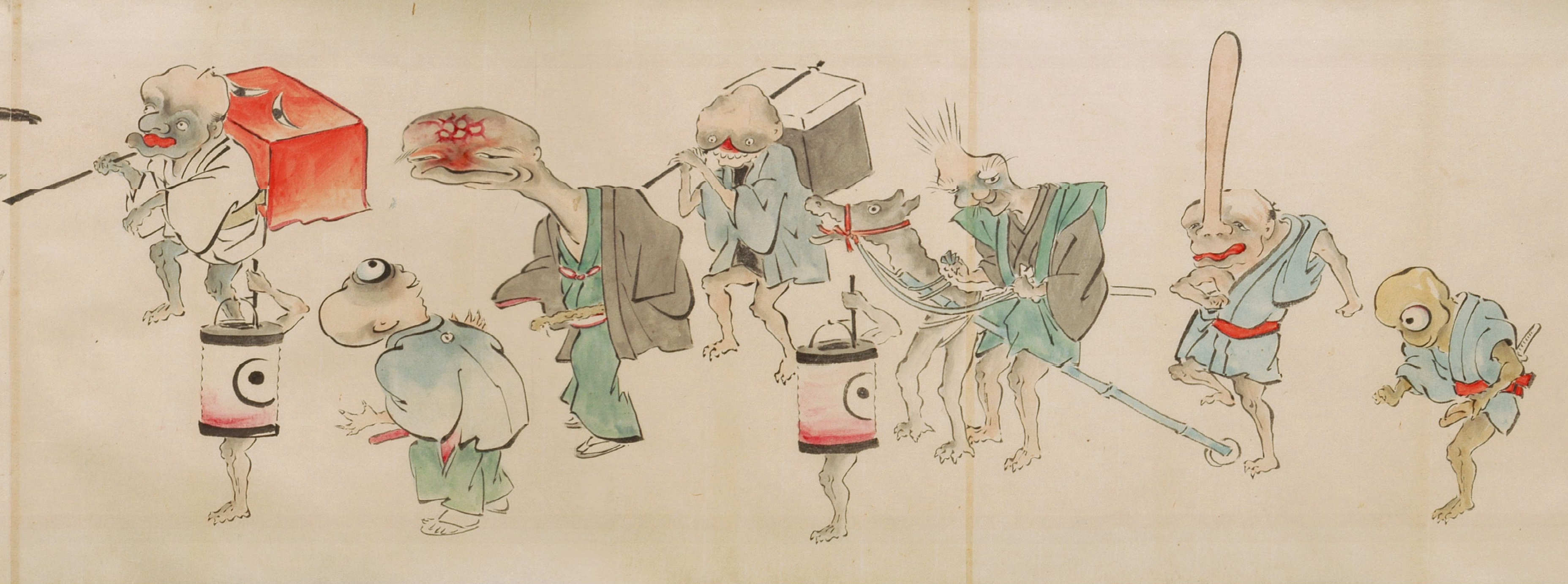
Far right art detail of scroll depicting Yokai betrothal, marriage, and home life, 16th century or 17th century

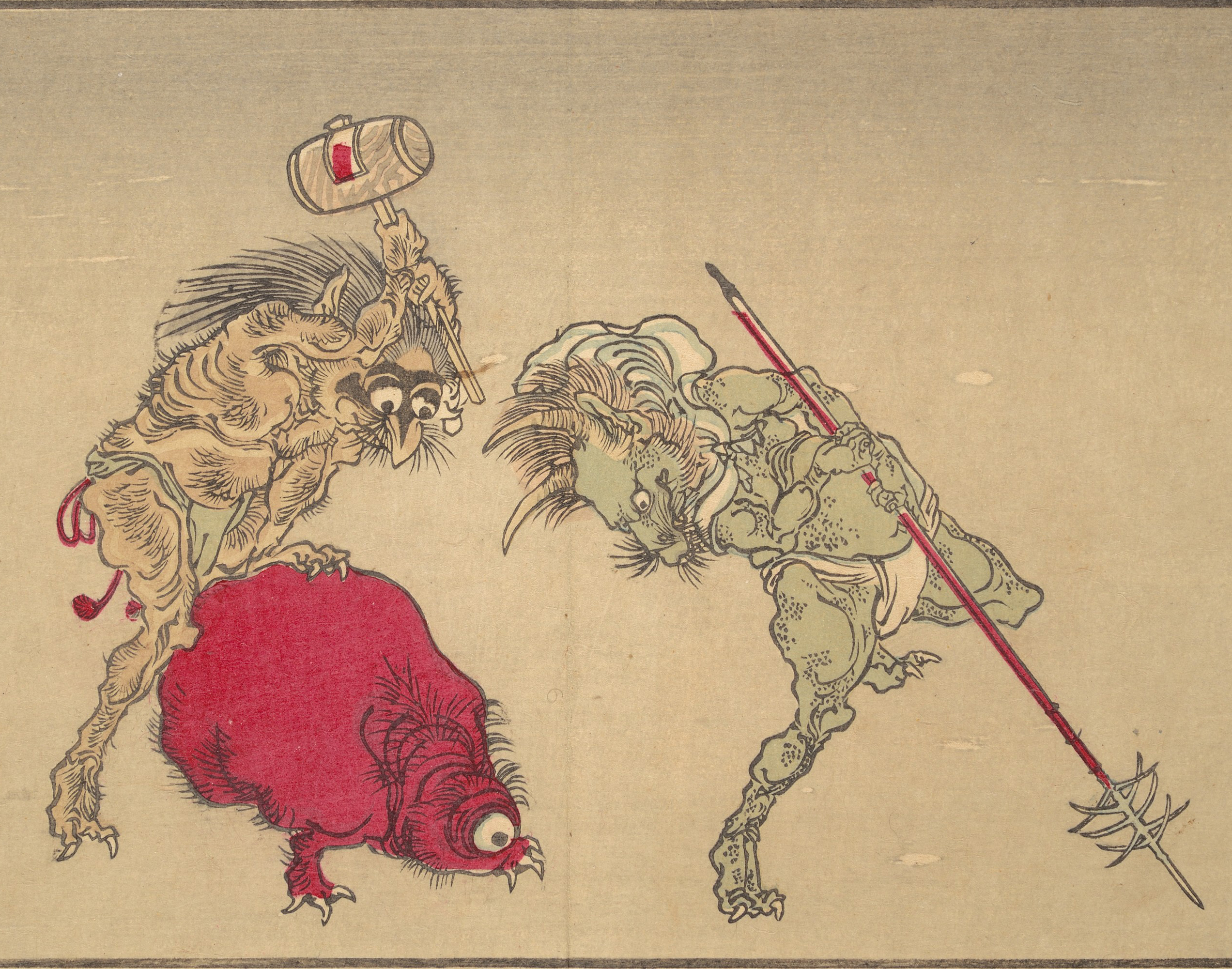
Yōkai artwork from "Kyōsai Kawanabe's Pictures of One Hundred Demons (1890), woodblock printed book (orihon, accordion-style); ink and color on paper.

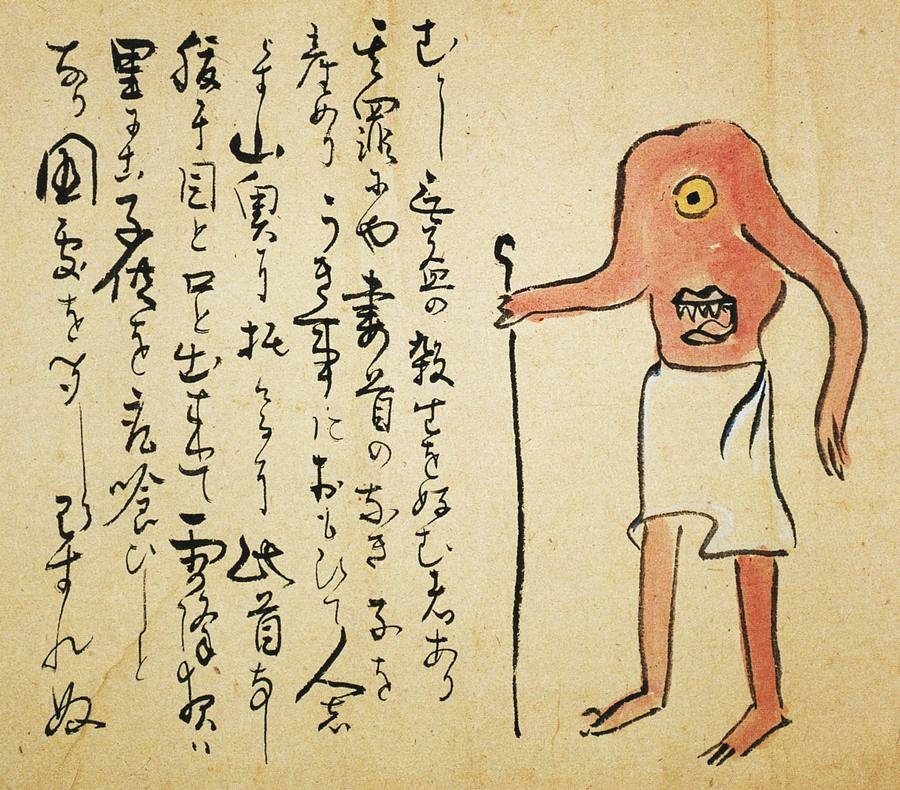
Yokai without a head

== See also ==
- Miyoshi Mononoke Museum
- List of museums in Japan
