= Yōsei =

Spiritlike creature from Japanese folklore

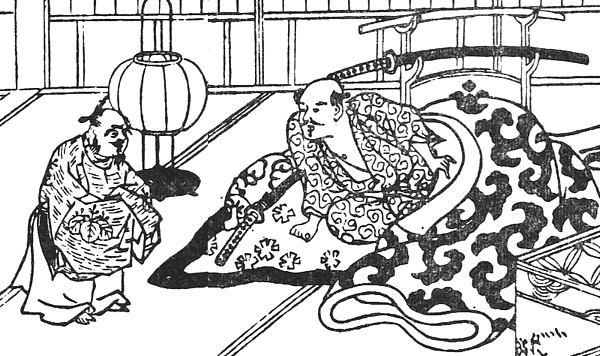
The house spirits Zashiki warashi, are described as being the size of a five or six-year-old child and prone to playing harmless pranks and occasionally causing mischief.

Yōsei (Japanese: 妖精; lit. "bewitching spirit") is a Japanese word that is generally synonymous with the English term fairy (フェアリー). Today, this word usually refers to spirits from Western legends, but occasionally it may also denote a creature from native Japanese folklore. For example, according to an old folk belief from Iwate Prefecture, it was once feared that the yōsei could resurrect the dead. It is also mentioned that the people of Mt. Hōrai are small fairies that have no knowledge of great evil and so their hearts never grow old. The Ainu also tell of a race of small people known as the Koro-pok-guru in their folklore. Another fairy-like being from Japan is the Kijimuna, tree sprites told in the Ryukyuan religion of Okinawa.

== See also ==
- Kobold – Sprite stemming from Germanic mythology
- Yaoguai – Creature from Chinese mythology
- Yōkai – Supernatural beings from Japanese folklore
