= Terashima =

Terashima (written: 寺島 or 寺嶋; sometimes read Terajima) is a Japanese surname. Notable people with the surname include:

- Kazuya Terashima a.k.a. Izumi Matsumoto (born 1958), Japanese manga artist
- Manji Terashima (1898–1983), Japanese photographer
- Naho Terashima (born 1993), Japanese ice hockey player
- Naruki Terashima (寺島 成輝, born 1998), Japanese baseball player
- Reiko Terashima (born 1958), Japanese yonkoma manga artist and illustrator
- Takuma Terashima (born 1983), Japanese voice actor
- Terashima Munenori (1832–1893), diplomat in Meiji period Japan
- Yū Terashima (born 1949), Japanese manga artist
