= Wakan Sansai Zue =

Japanese leishu encyclopedia

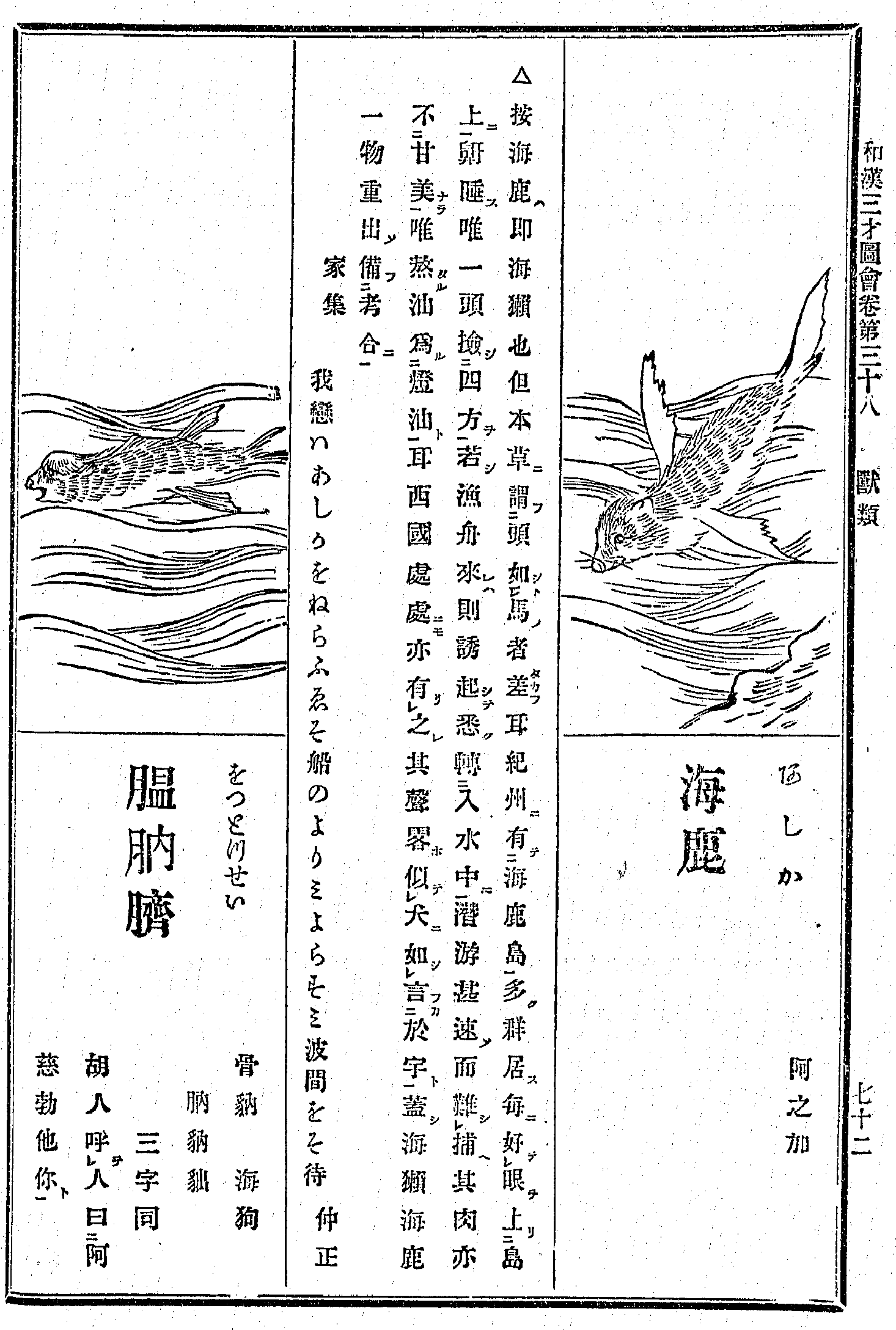
Sea lion (right) and fur seal, Wakan Sansai Zue, vol 38 p. 72 (c. 1712)

The Wakan Sansai Zue (和漢三才図会; Kyujitai: 和漢󠄁三才圖會, lit. "Illustrated Sino-Japanese Encyclopedia") is an illustrated Japanese leishu encyclopedia published in 1712 in the Edo period. It consists of 105 volumes in 81 books. Its compiler was Terashima or Terajima (寺島良安, Terajima Ryōan), a doctor from Osaka. It describes and illustrates various activities of daily life, such as carpentry and fishing, as well as plants and animals, and constellations. It depicts the people of "different/strange lands" (ikoku) and "outer barbarian peoples".

== Sources used ==
As seen from the title of the book (wa 和, which means Japan, and kan 漢, which means China), Terajima's idea was based on a Chinese encyclopedia, specifically the Ming work Sancai Tuhui ("Pictorial..." or "Illustrated Compendium of the Three Powers") by Wang Qi (1607), known in Japan as the Sansai Zue (三才図会). Reproductions of the Wakan Sansai Zue are still in print in Japan.
