= Bakemono no e =

Japanese handscroll of the Edo period depicting 35 characters from Japanese folklore

Bakemono no e (化物之繪, "Illustrations of Supernatural Creatures"), also known by its alternate title Bakemonozukushie (化物尽繪, "Illustrated Index of Supernatural Creatures"), is a Japanese handscroll of the Edo period depicting 35 bakemono from Japanese folklore. The figures are hand-painted on paper in vivid pigments with accents in gold and silver pigments. Each bakemono is labeled with its name in hand-brushed ink. There is no other writing on the scroll, no colophon, and no artist's signature or seal.

== Provenance ==
Bakemono no e is held by the L. Tom Perry Special Collections of the Harold B. Lee Library at Brigham Young University in Provo, Utah, US and is part of the Harry F. Bruning Collection of Japanese rare books and manuscripts. Harry F. Bruning (1886–1975) acquired the scroll from Charles E. Tuttle (1915–1993) in 1952. The artwork is dated to c. 1660 as according to the description of the scroll in Tuttle's catalog 266 (October 1952), which would make it the arguably the oldest extant example of the bakemonozukushi, or monster index, genre. Most of the bakemono illustrated are also found in other scrolls and books of the Edo period, with a few exceptions.

== Scholarly interest ==
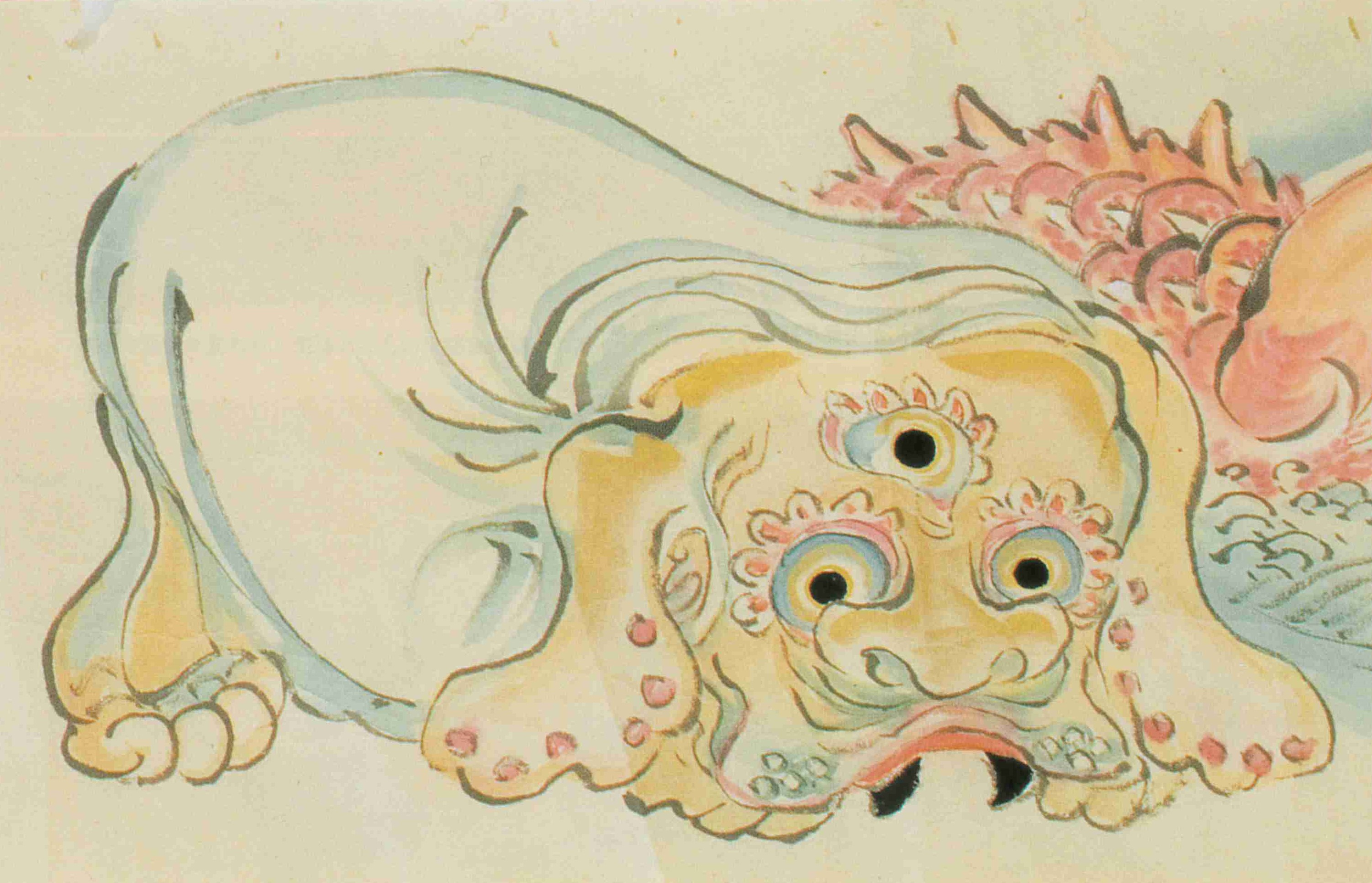
Nurikabe from a scroll dated 1802 by Kanō Tōrin Yoshinobu (狩野洞琳由信) in the collection of Kōichi Yumoto.

The scroll came to the attention of Japanese scholars and the famous manga artist Shigeru Mizuki (1922–2015) in 2007 when digital images of the scroll were shared with Kōichi Yumoto (ja:湯本豪一), then curator at the Kawasaki City Museum (ja:川崎市市民ミュージアム). Yumoto was surprised to find an image of a three-eyed bakemono clearly labeled "Nurikabe" in the BYU scroll that matched an unlabeled illustration of the same figure in a scroll Yumoto owns. The Nurikabe image later became the topic of scholarly debate in Japan.

== Bakemono list ==
The following is a list of bakemono featured in Bakemono no e, along with their backgrounds.

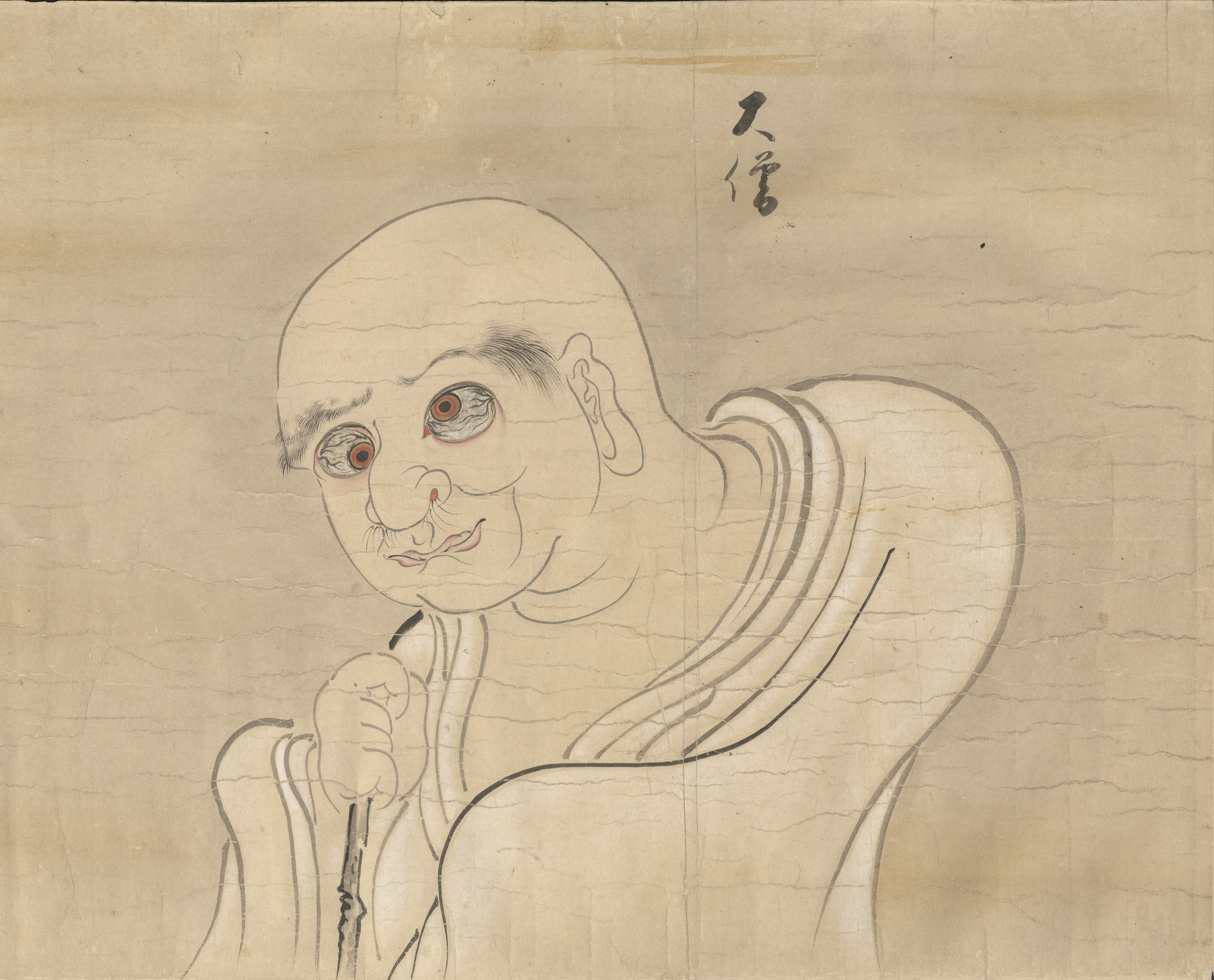
1 Daisō (大僧) means "big monk". In most other scrolls and books, this image is labeled Mikoshi-nyūdō (見越し入道), and may or may not be the same yōkai. However, there is one other scroll, "Picture Scroll of One Hundred Demons", in which it is labeled Daisō.

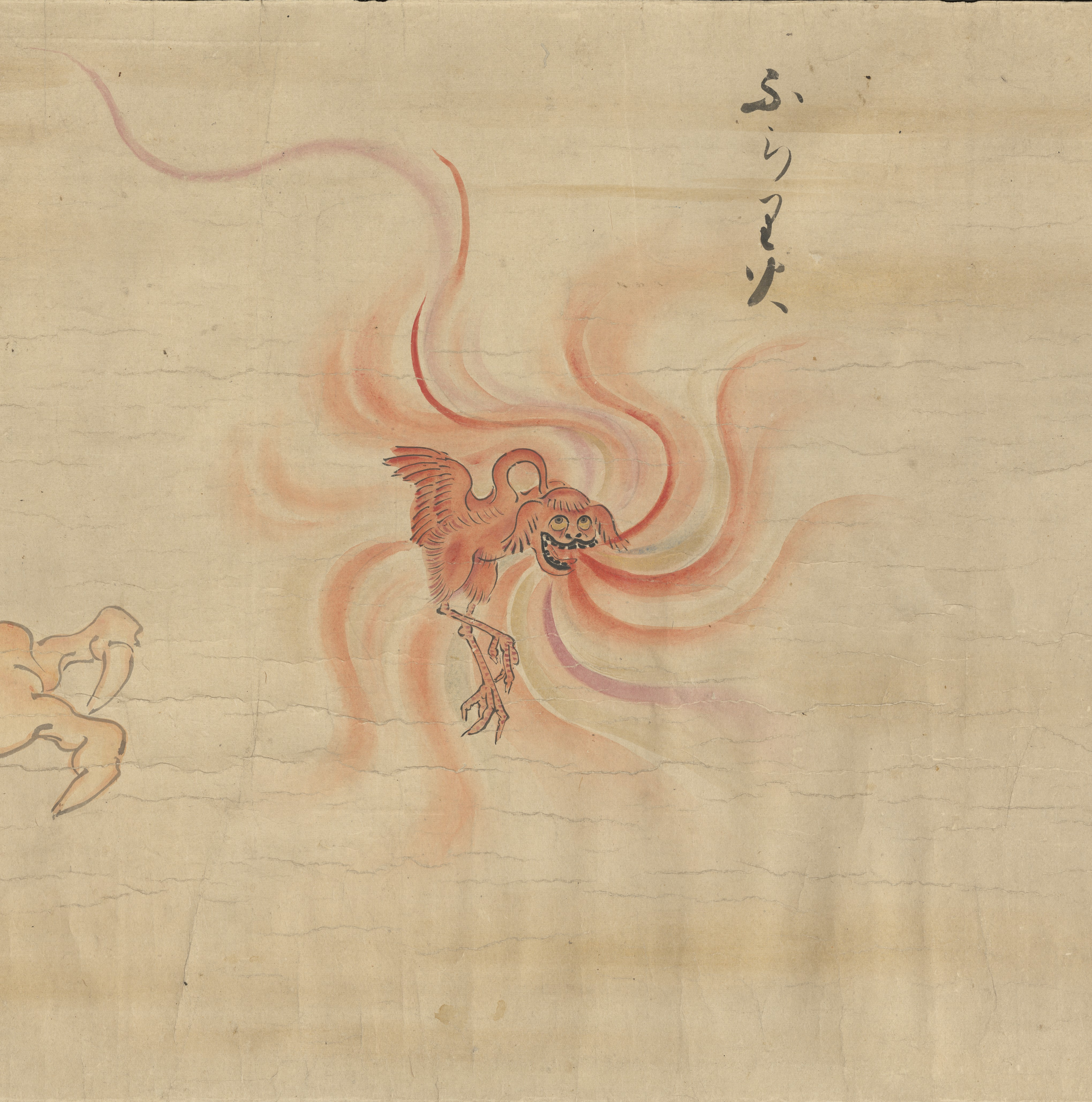
2 Furaribi (ふらり火) means "aimless fire". This aimlessness is due to the troubled nature of the soul that has become a furaribi by undergoing some kind of unnatural suffering, such as mistakes in burial rites or cruel murder, and is now unable to move on to the next life. Furaribi is often depicted as a small flaming bird that can be easily confused for a fire or lantern in the distance.

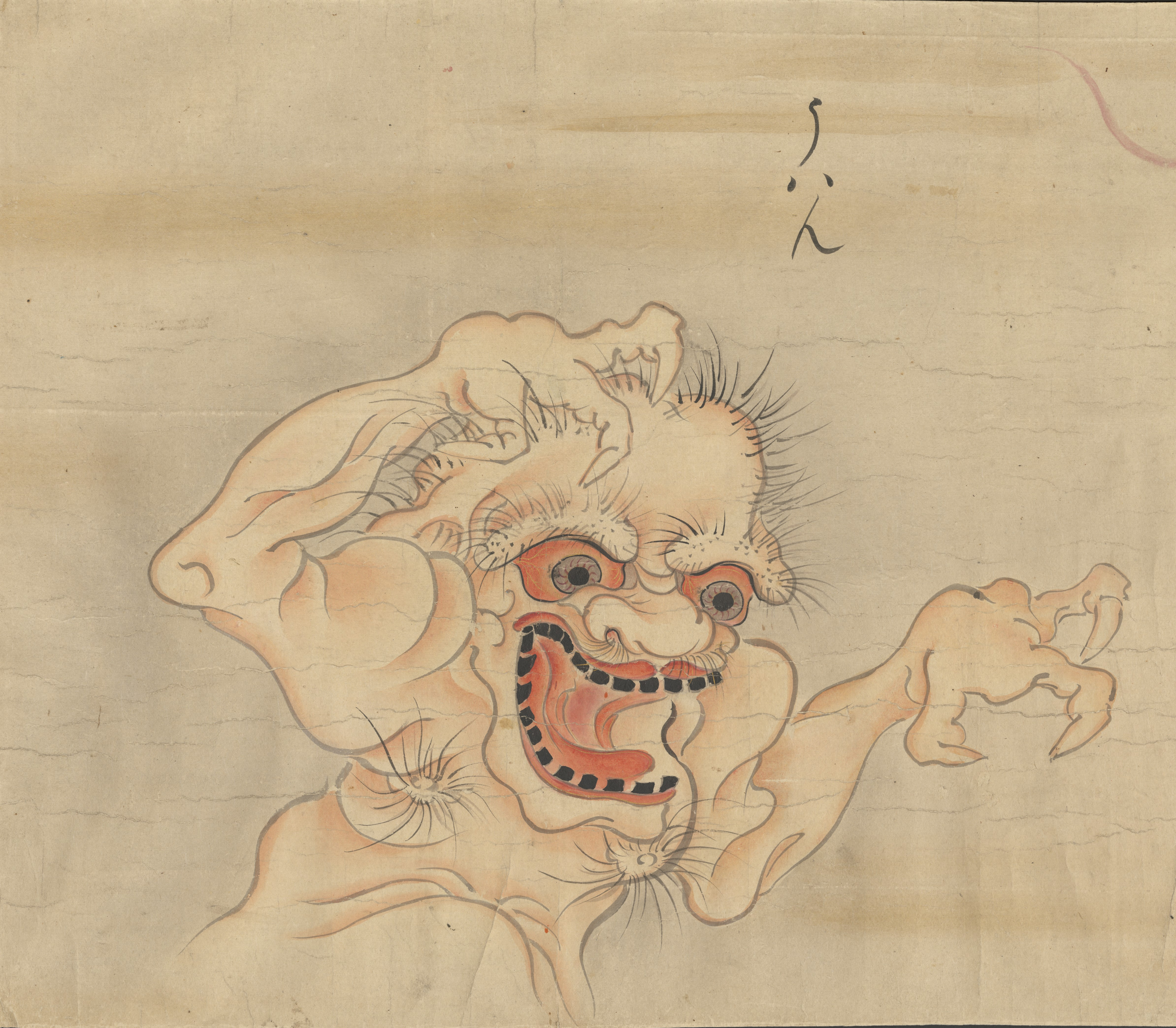
3 Uwan (うわん) is a creature in Japanese folklore that is a disembodied voice. In most folktales it shouts out "Uwan," consequently frightening those who hear it. Uwan are typically found haunting old homes and abandoned temples. One of the main tales about uwan comes from Aomori Prefecture, and tells of how it yelled in an older couple's house all through the night, keeping them up and frightening them. Uwan had no physical form until the Edo period, when scrolls such as Bakemono no e depicted it in anthropomorphic form.

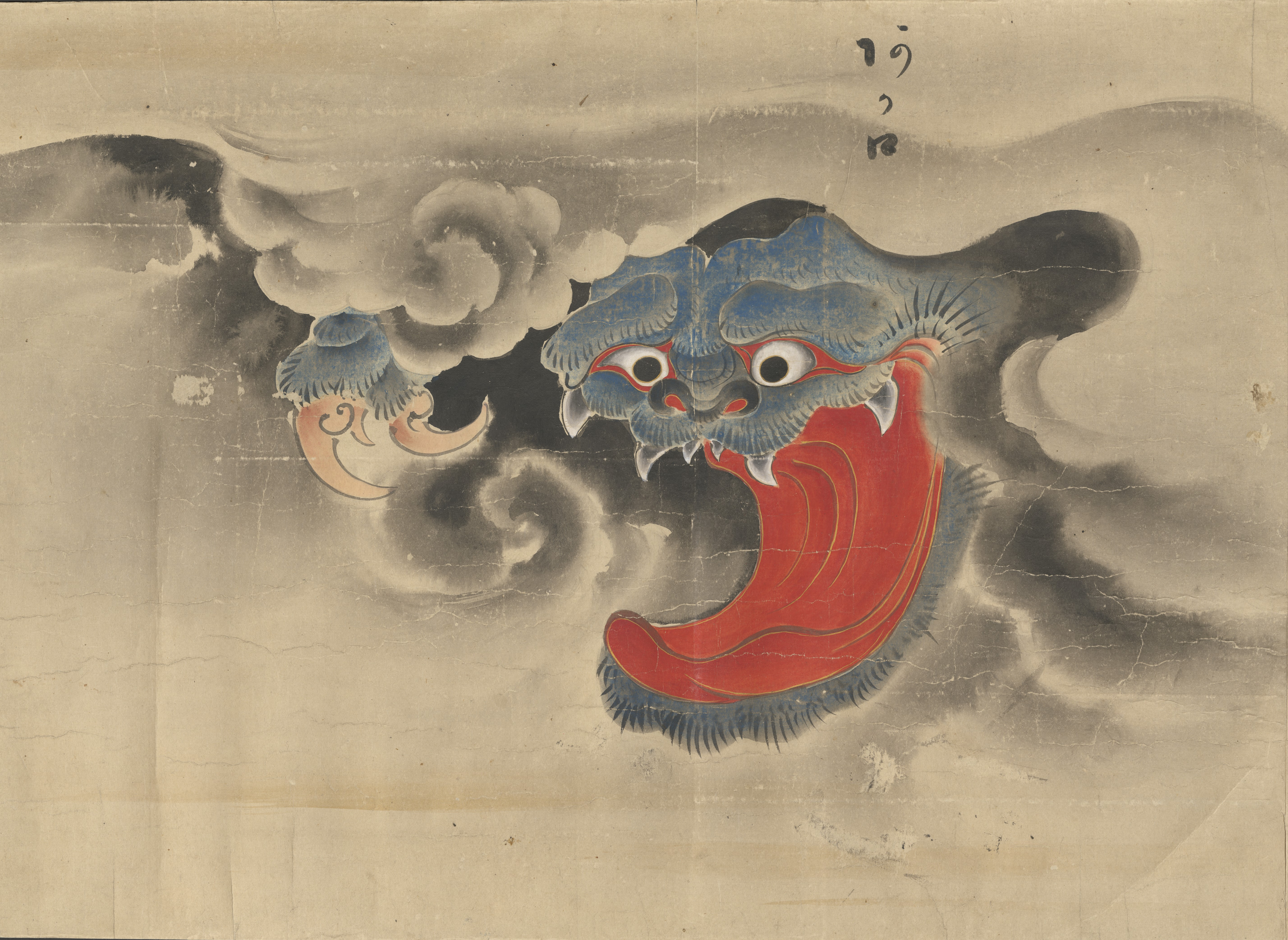
4 Akaguchi (赤口) is a yōkai from the northwestern region of Aomori prefecture. This yōkai resides in an amorphous black cloud, baring visibly its komainu (Japanese lion-dog) face and large claws. Its face and claws are covered in thick blue hair. It is distinguished by its large red mouth and tongue. Akaguchi is portrayed above a floodgate due to its association with the use of water in a farming country. Though some sources say Akaguchi is simply an omen of bad luck, others represent Akaguchi as a protective spirit. During droughts, some would siphon above the allotted amount of water for their personal fields, which was a crime that could cost neighboring farmers their livelihood. The perpetrators of this crime not punished by law would be punished by Akaguchi. Akaguchi would appear and eat them alive. Akaguchi is more commonly known by the name Akashita. This alternate name uses the characters meaning "red tongue" 赤舌 instead of "red mouth" 赤口 and parallels the name of the god Shakuzetsujin 赤舌神 found within a traditional Japanese esoteric cosmology called Onmyōdō 陰陽道 (The Way of Yin and Yang).

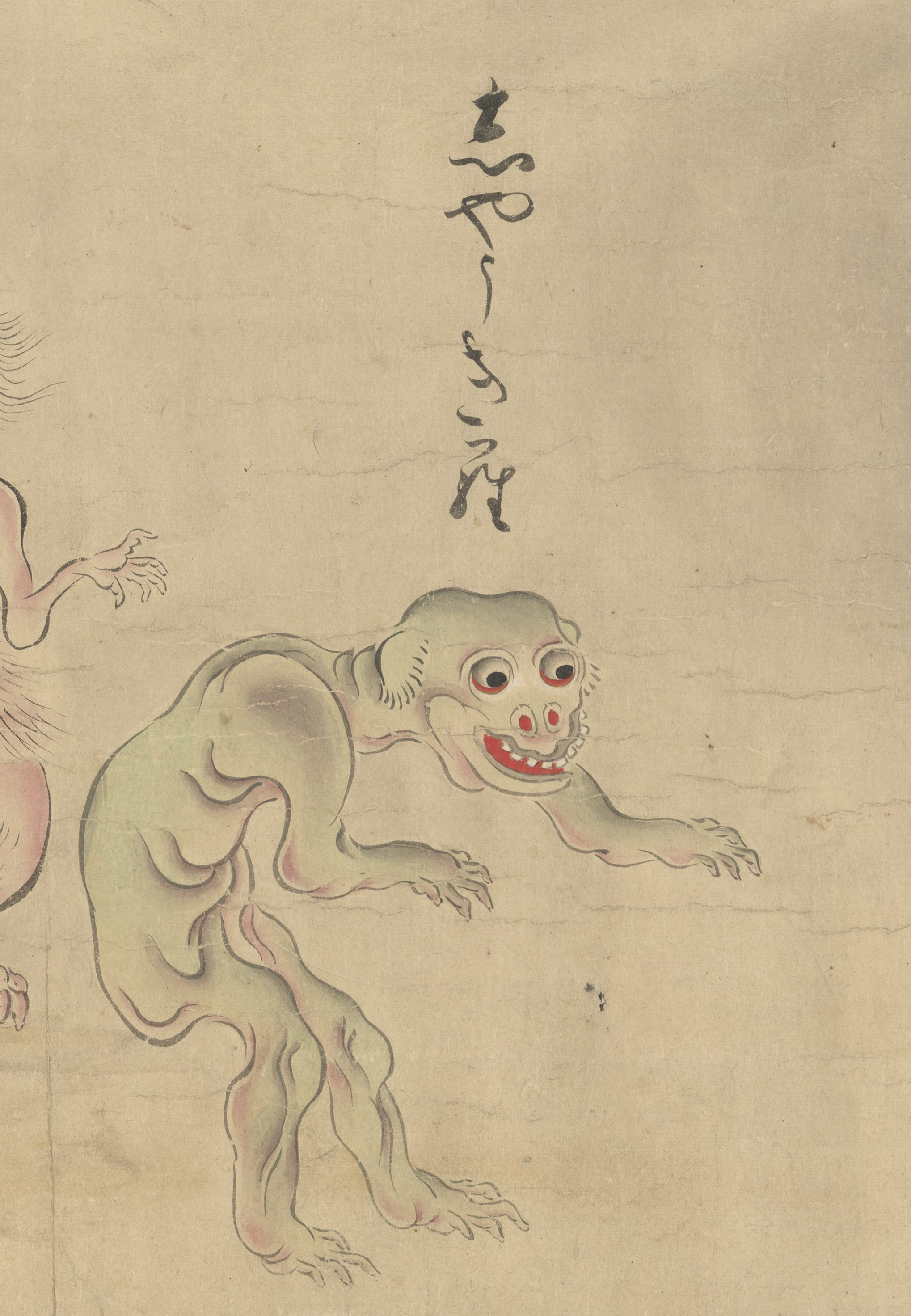
5 Shōkira (しょうきら), also called Shōkera, is a yōkai that has its origins in Chinese Daoism and was introduced to Japan during the Nara period. Originally an un-embodied spirit, Shōkira eventually came to be illustrated as a hairless dog-like creature. It is said that Shōkira leaves its host human's body on the night of kōshin (庚申), which comes every 60 days in the zodiac cycle, to report on its host human's bad deeds to the deity of lifespan. Bad reports result in a shortened lifespan for the host human. To avoid this, believers stayed awake throughout the night on kōshin days, or chanted an incantation to prevent Shōkira from leaving the body.

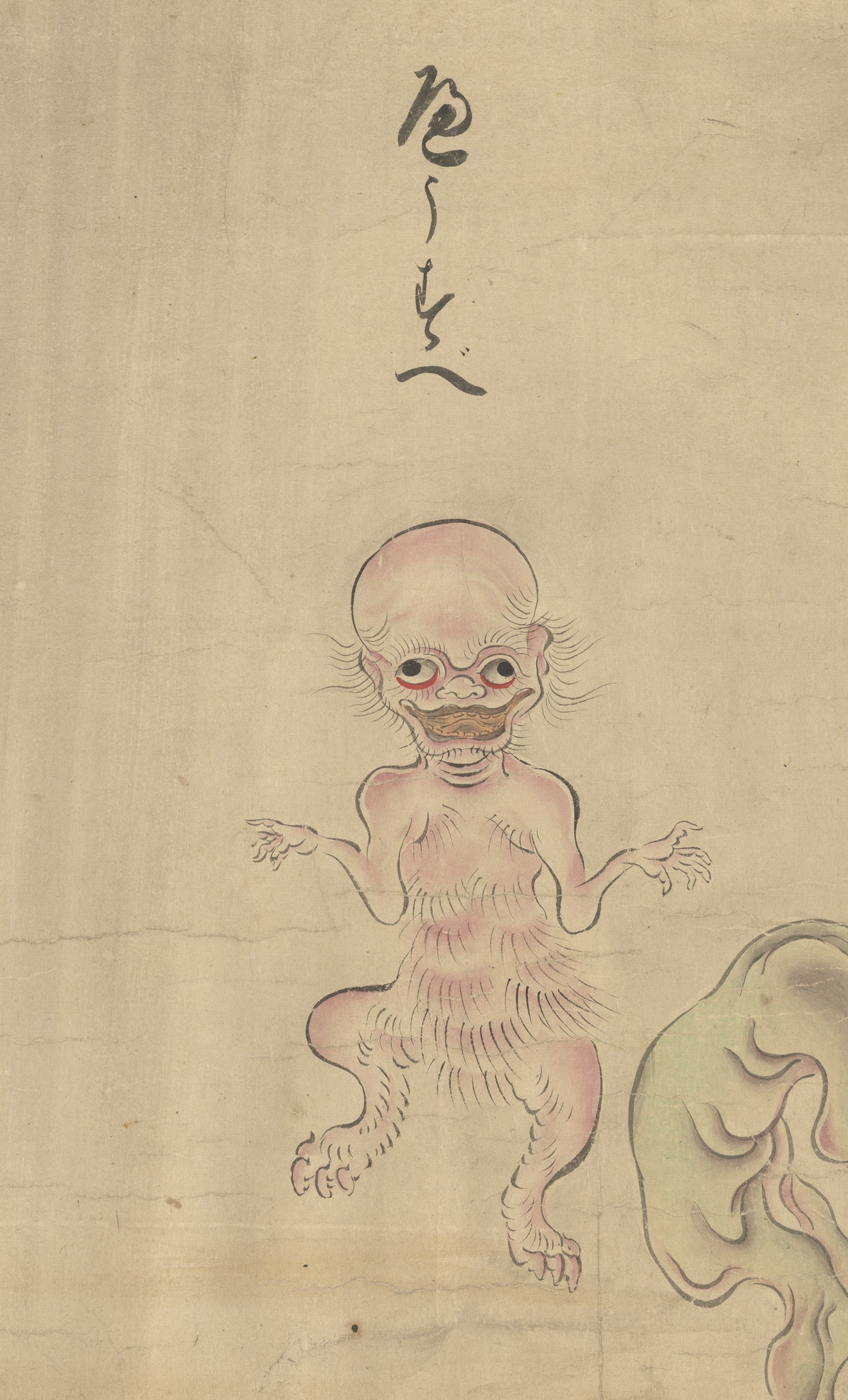
6 Hyōsube (ひょうすべ) is a child-sized river monster from Kyūshū that lives in underwater caves. It prefers to come out at night and loves to eat eggplants. It is thought to be a cousin of the kappa. Hyōsube were originally dolls that were brought to life by a magician and used to build a shrine. After the shrine was finished, they were dumped in a river. They were believed to be named after Hyōbu-taifu. They are found generally in Saga and Miyazaki prefectures in Kyushu. Hyōsube are small creatures with hairy bodies and bald heads, sharp teeth, and long claws. They live in rivers but like to get into people's bathtubs. Once they are done using the bathtubs, they leave them smelly and covered in greasy hair.

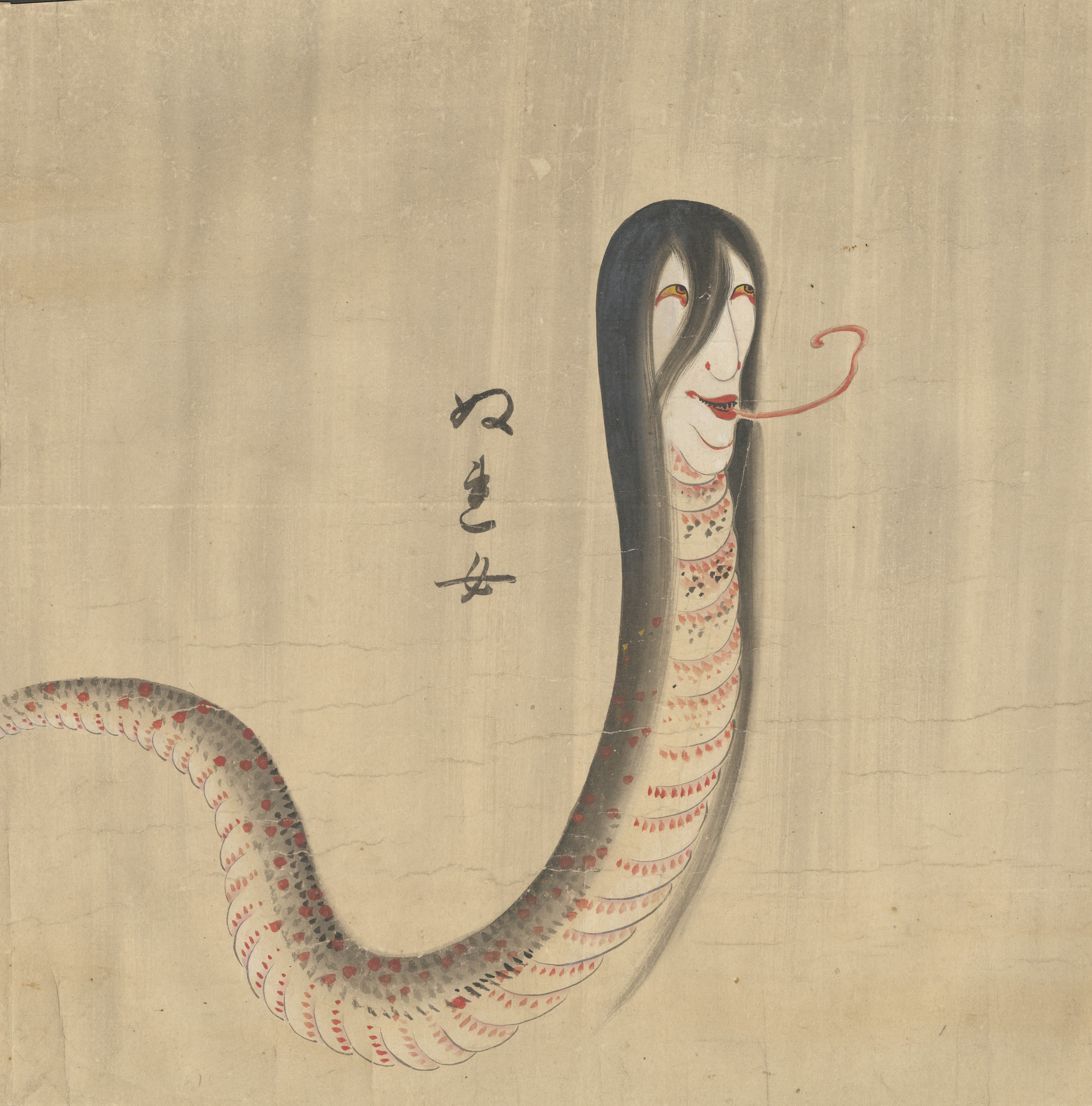
7 Nure-onna (ぬれ女) "wet woman" (alternate name Nure-yomejo) looks like a reptile with a snake-like body and a woman's head. Nure-onna tends to be a combination of sea serpent and vampire. She roams open waters such as oceans, rivers, and lakes, searching for her prey: humans and their blood. She is found in the regions of Kyūshū, Niigata and Fukushima. It is said that Nure-onna is married to or closely associated with Ushi-oni, and they work together as a team. Nure-onna hands her baby off to innocent strangers, then walks into the sea and disappears. The baby becomes incredibly heavy so that the victim cannot move. Ushi-oni then comes out of the water to attack and they feed on the prey together.

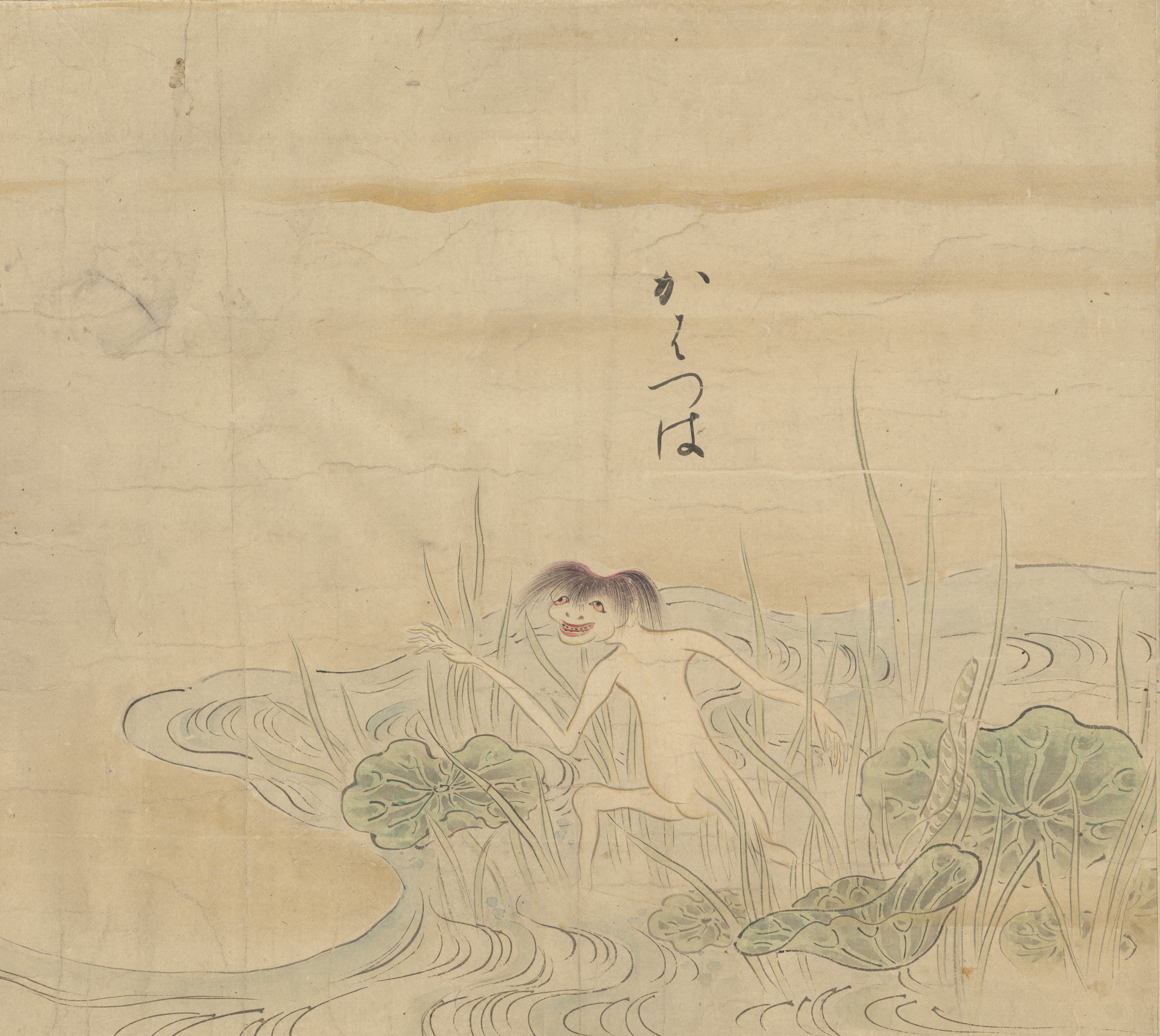
8 Kappa (かっぱ) live in the lakes and rivers of Japan. They spend most of their time in the water but are able to walk and live on land. They are said to be about the size of a child. The kappa has webbed feet and hands, scaly or slippery skin, with a turtle-like shell on its back. Kappa are normally green in color. Most depictions of kappa have a dish-like structure on the top of its head, which is filled with some kind of liquid. Kappa enjoy sumo wrestling, eating cucumbers, and causing trouble in various ways. They are both dangerous and helpful, being recognized as both a god and a demon in various parts of Japan. The kappa is one of the most popular yōkai from Japan, with many appearances in media worldwide. Despite their menacing stories and inappropriate behavior, they are often portrayed as cute creatures who are friends with humans.

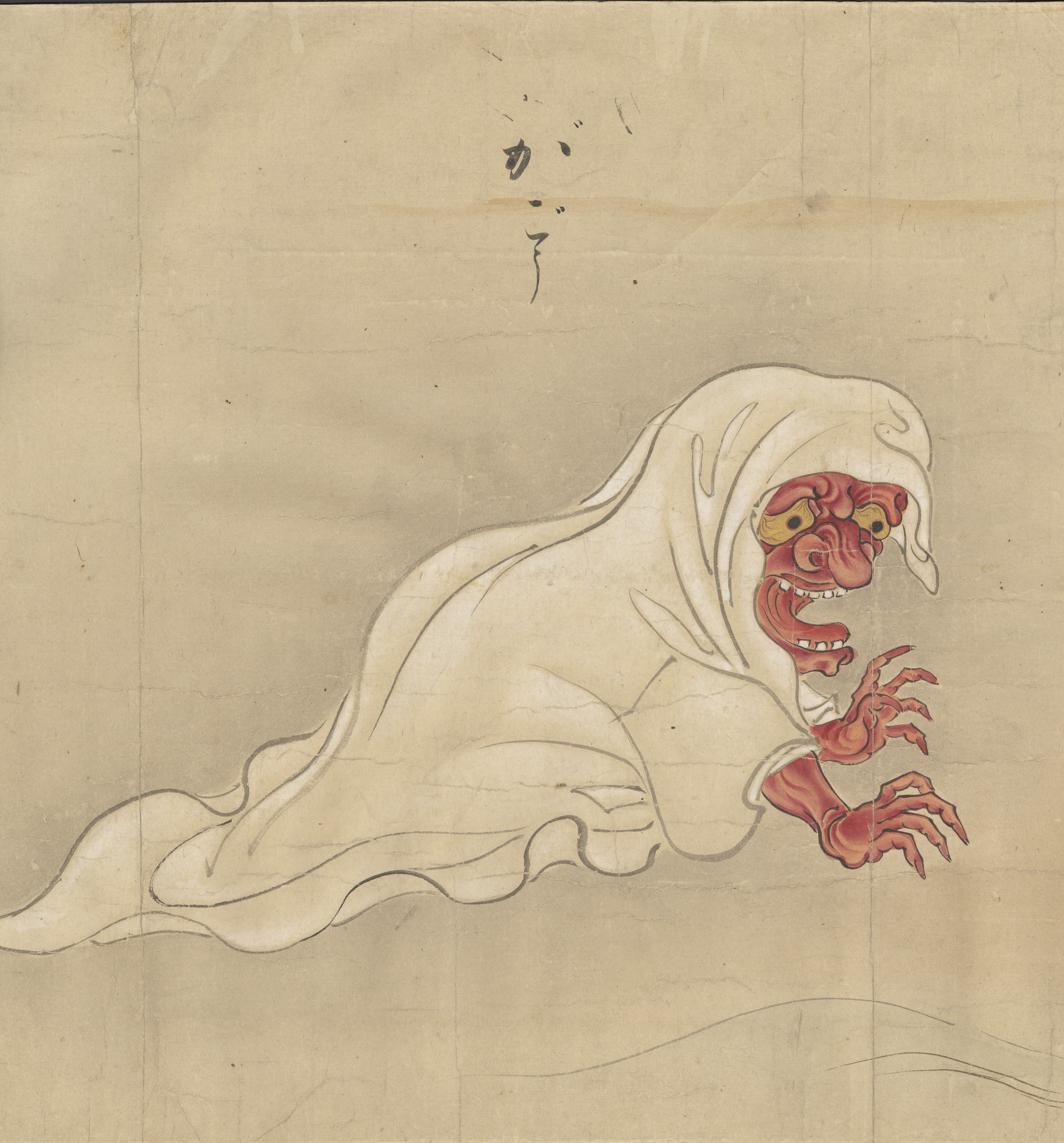
9 Gagō (がごう) or Gagoze (元興寺) is a reiki, or demon ghost, which according to legend inhabited the bell tower of Gangō-ji, a temple in Nara Prefecture from which its name is derived. It wears a robe and crawls across the ground. According to legend, it would emerge at night and kill apprenticed children at the temple until a boy with exceptional strength decided to stop it. The boy waited at night for Gagō to appear, then grabbed it by the hair with his firm grip. The monster struggled so hard that the scalp tore from its head and it fled. Following the blood trail to a grave, the temple priests discovered that the ghost of a wicked servant of the temple had become Gagō. It never appeared at Gangō-ji again. p

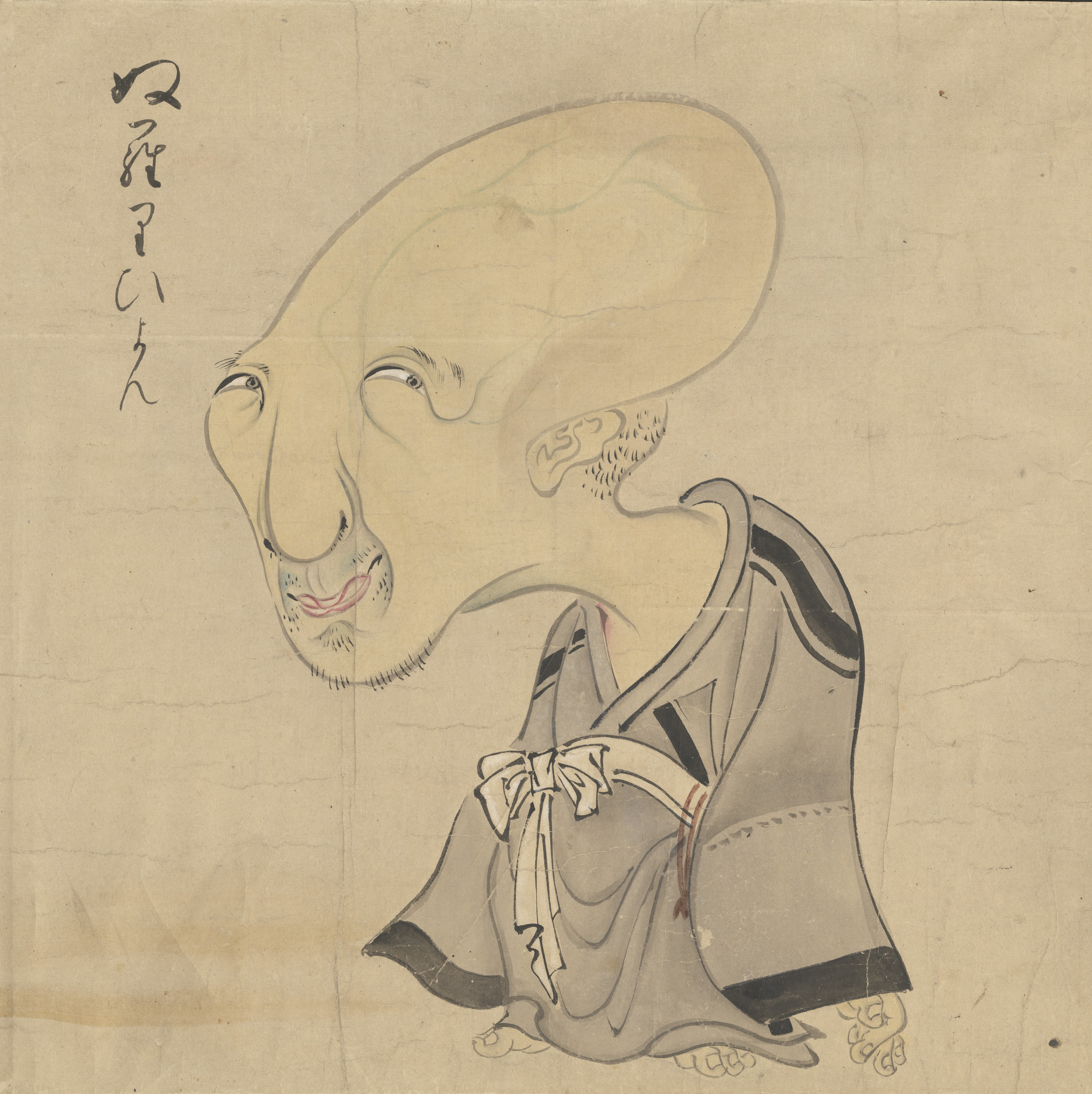
10 Nurarihyon (ぬらりひょん), sometimes referred to as Nūrihyon, is a Japanese yōkai with a murky origin. He is known to sneak into houses and indulge in all of a household's fine goods, such as tea and tobacco. He particularly likes to enter wealthy homes when the head of the household is too busy to properly attend to him. In modern interpretations, he is considered the leader of the yōkai. Scholars believe this update to his folklore was the result of a depiction in a 1929 book by Morihiko Fujisawa. One of the most powerful and elite yōkai, he is treated with utmost respect by other yōkai.

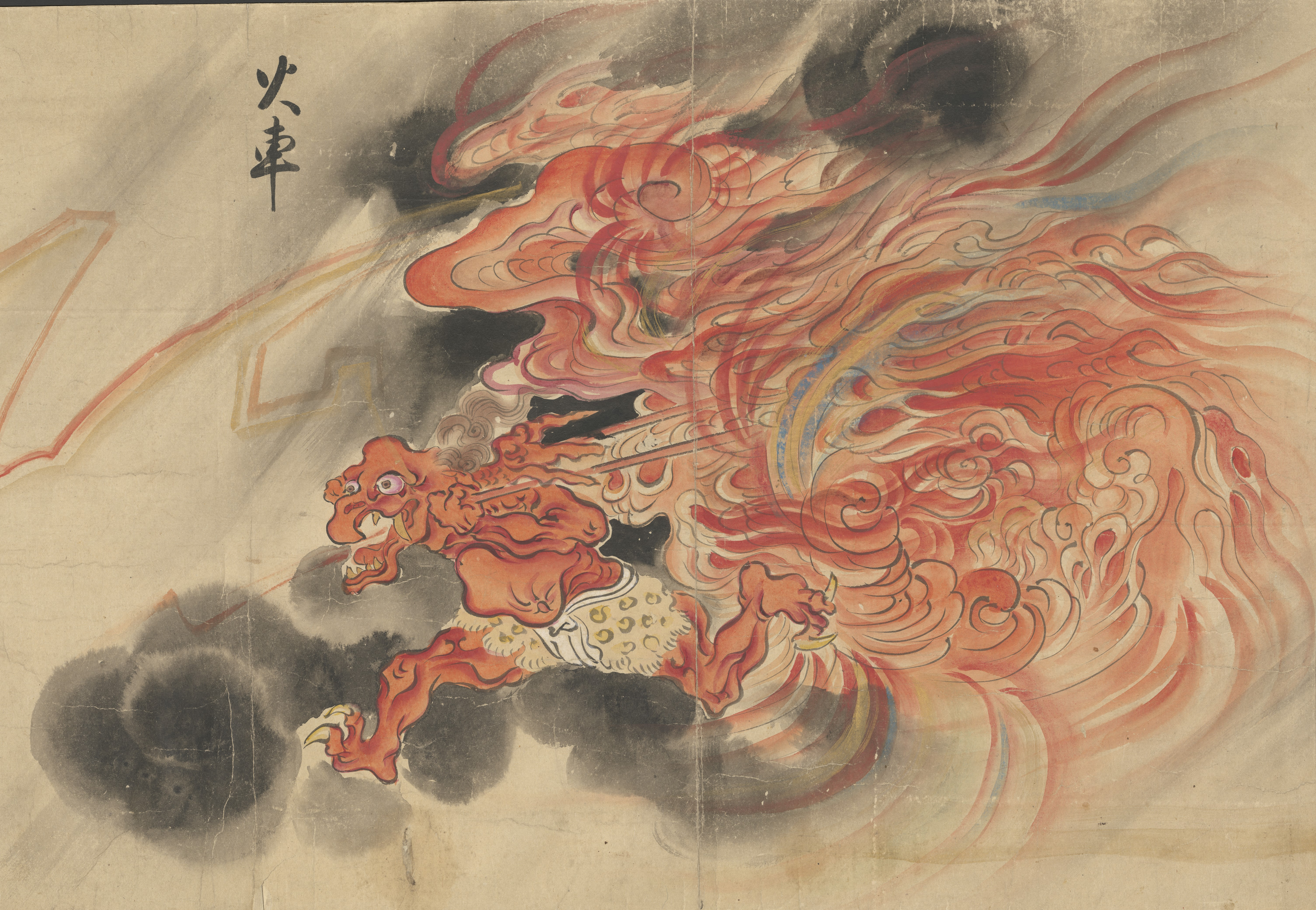
11 Kasha (火車) is a form of Japanese demon (oni) or monster (yōkai) that steals the corpses of those who performed evil acts during their lifetime. Kasha are often depicted as a feline demon, but this scroll depicts the kasha as a demon pulling a cart wreathed in flame. Kasha literally means "burning cart" or "fiery chariot". Kasha were depicted as a fiery chariot which took the dead away to hell, and were depicted as such in Buddhist paintings, such as rokudō-e. Kasha appeared in other Buddhist paintings of the era, notably jigoku-zōshi (Buddhist 'hellscapes', paintings depicting the horrors of hell), where they were depicted as flaming carts pulled by demons. Tales of the kasha were used by the Buddhist preachers to persuade believers to avoid sin.

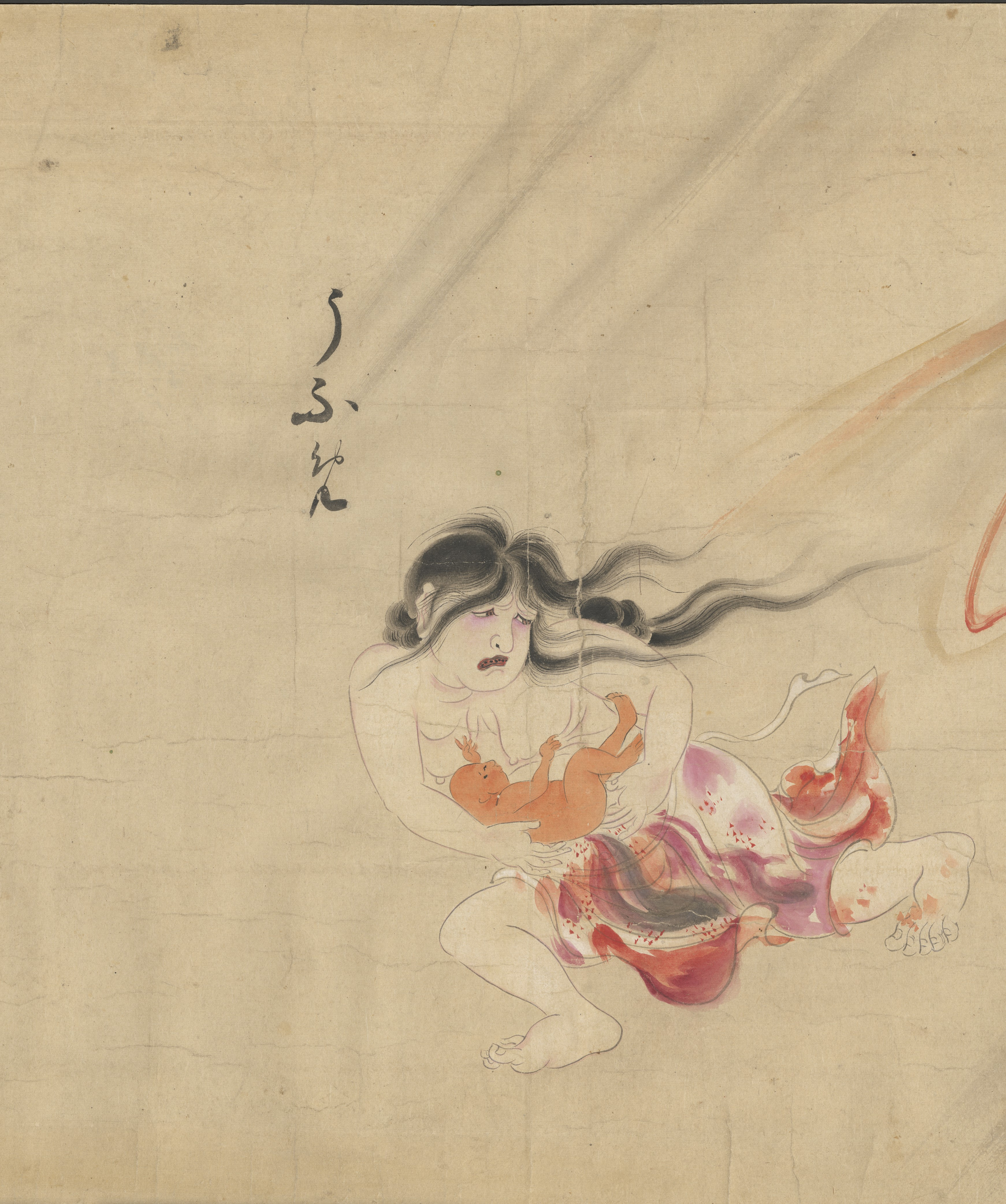
12 Ubume (うぶめ) can be described as a type of supernatural entity, or yōkai. Throughout folk stories and literature, the identity and appearance of ubume vary. However, she is most commonly depicted as the spirit of a woman who has died during childbirth. Passersby will see her as a normal-looking woman carrying a baby. She will typically try to give a passerby her child then disappear. When the person looks at the child they discover it is only a bundle of leaves or a large rock. Ubume was conceived through various means of social and religious influence. During the late medieval period of Japan, attitudes surrounding motherhood started to change. For a mother to die in childbirth or late pregnancy came to be considered a sin; blame for the death of the unborn child came to be placed on the mother who in a sense was responsible for the infant's death.

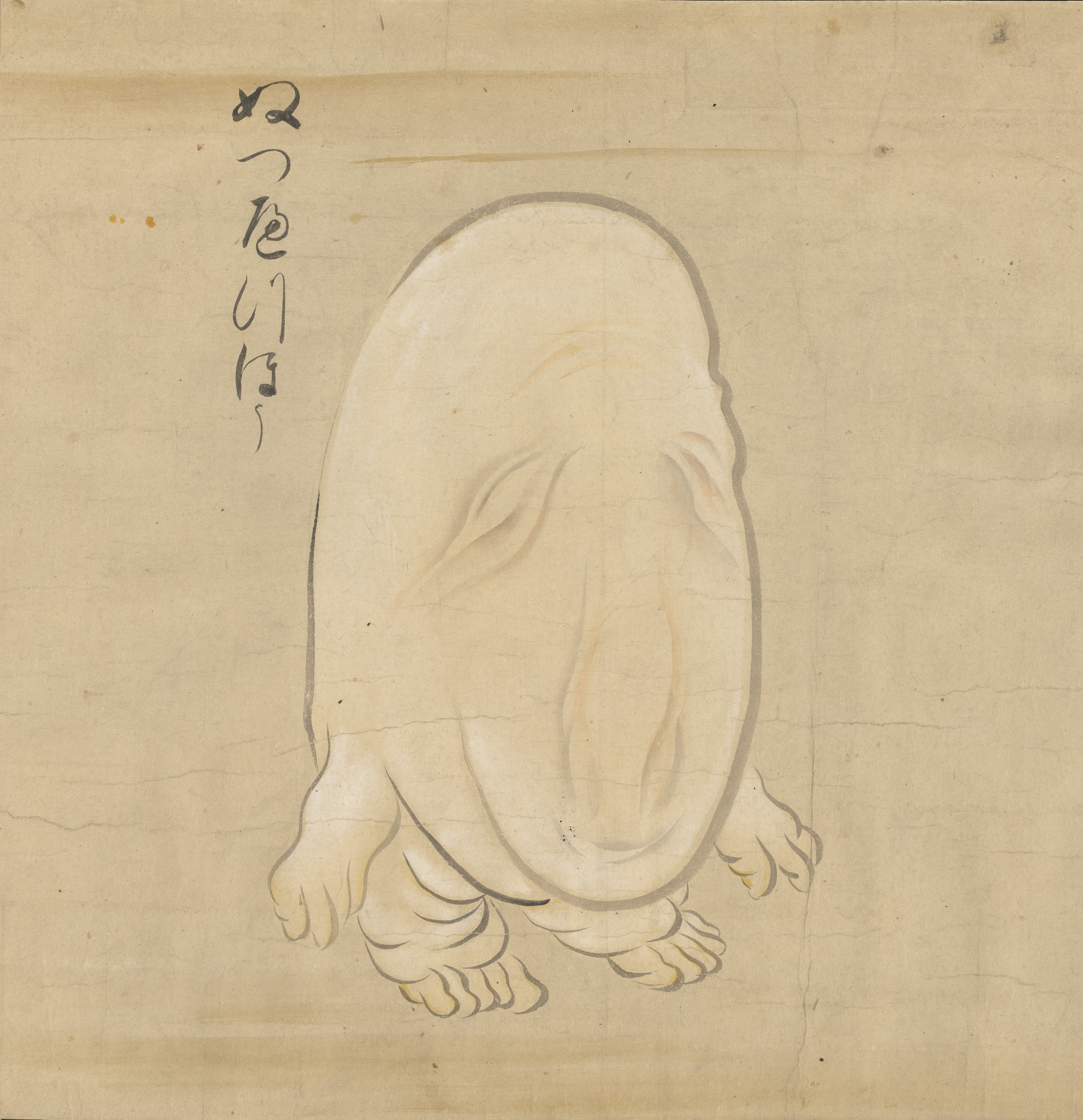
13 Nuppeppō (ぬっぺっぽう) is a yōkai in Japanese folklore. Its name is derived from the Japanese word nupperi, which means "flat-faced" or "dazed expression". It is a large, fleshy blob with saggy lumps taking on the form of arms and legs, and fatty wrinkles that resemble eyes, a nose, and a mouth. In addition to looking like a lump of meat, nuppeppō also has a pungent odor and smells like rotting corpses. It usually stays in dark, secluded areas such as mountain ridges, abandoned temples, unpopular streets and alleys, and footpaths between rice paddies. It seems to enjoy seeing humans' shocked and surprised expressions. Maki Bokusen (牧墨僊, 1775–1824) records in volume 3 of his 1810 text Hitoyo-hanashi (一宵話) a 1609 incident in which something like a nuppeppō was sighted in the shogun Tokugawa Ieyasu's (徳川家康) gardens. Ieyasu was so repulsed by the creature that he ordered it taken away, and it was cast out to the mountains. Afterward, he learned that he had missed out, as eating its flesh was said to give unusual strength.

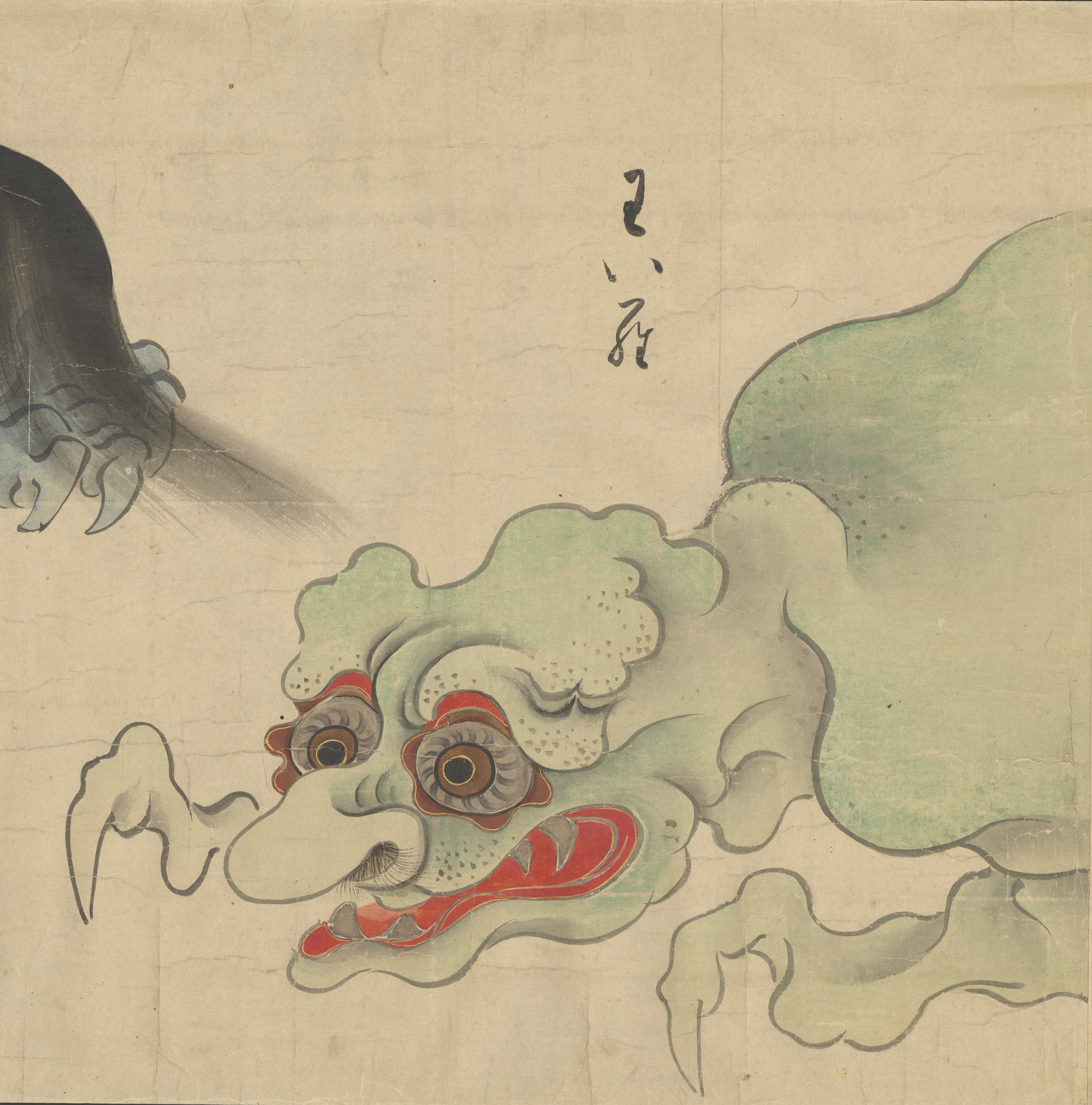
14 Waira (わいら) is a Japanese yōkai. The only information available comes from a handful of images in scrolls and books. It has two arms that each have one claw. The back half of its body is never depicted. Waira live in the mountains and are never found in flat areas.

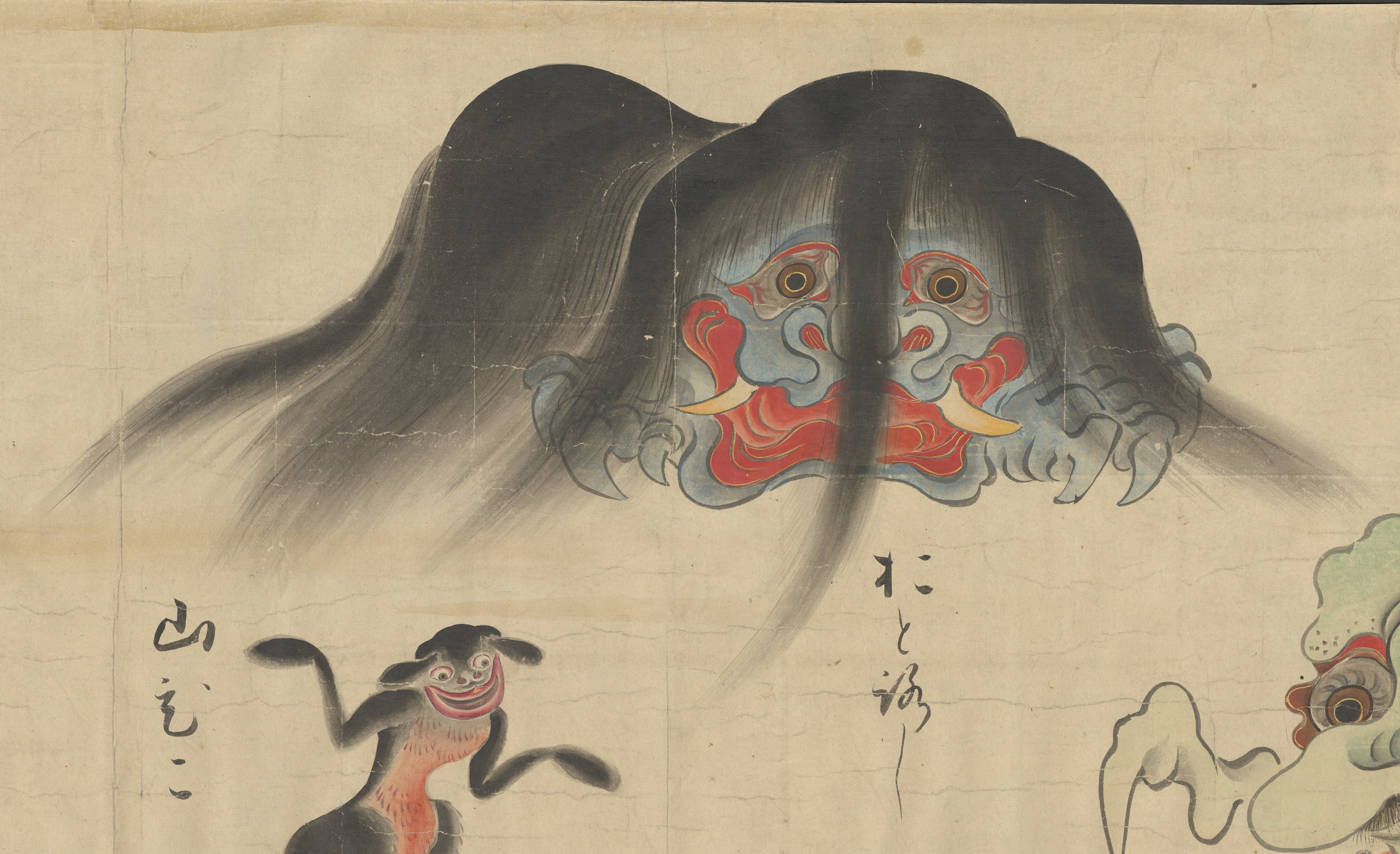
15 Otoroshi (おとろし) is a regional corruption of the word osoroshi, meaning scary, frightening or disheveled. It is most commonly depicted in pictures sitting on top of the arches at the entryway of old Shinto shrines. Sometimes called the "Wild-Haired Punisher of the Impious", the Otoroshi acts as a guardian of these shrines and will devour the evil people who try to enter. Otoroshi may also live in abandoned homes, demonstrated when someone suddenly grows old passing it. While its appearance is similar to an oni, it is also accepted as a guardian spirit.

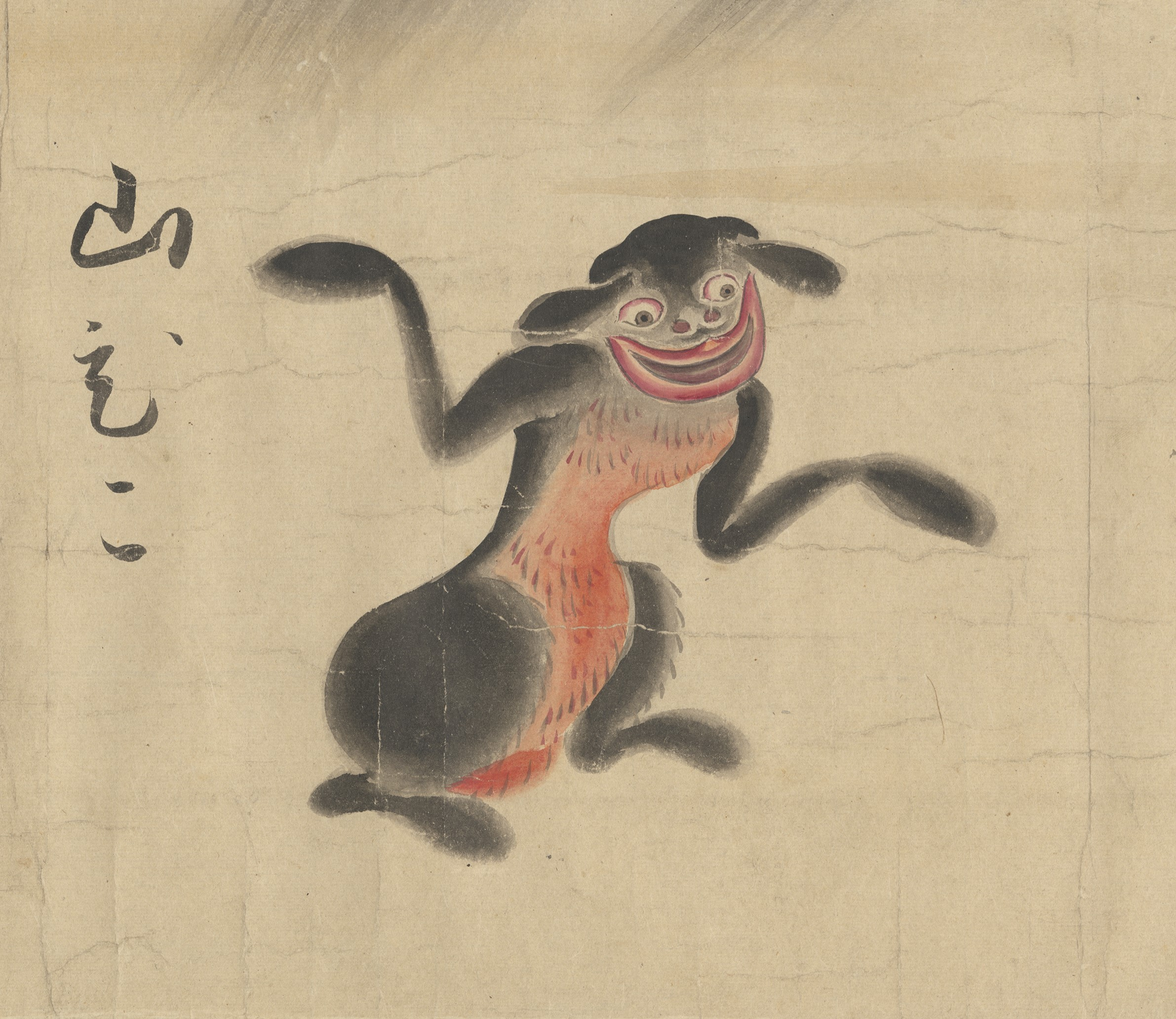
16 Yamabiko (山びこ) is a yōkai in Japanese folklore that can be found in mountainous terrain. When echoes appear to be coming from a mysterious origin or come back sounding different, this is attributed to a yamabiko. Directly translated, "yamabiko" means "echo." However, the kanji characters translate closer to "spirit of the valley reverberation". Commonly it is written with the characters for "mountain" and "boy," referring to both the habitat of the yamabiko and its smaller stature. It is a relatively harmless yōkai, causing confusion rather than any serious injury. On the rare occasion when they are seen and not just heard, they appear as a hybrid between a dog and monkey. Living deep in the mountains, direct encounters with the yamabiko are rare. This small and elusive yōkai was not officially classified until the Edo period in Japan. Instead, the bizarre noises coming from the mountain were attributed to natural phenomena such as birds and not given any spiritual significance. Artists often depict the yamabiko in this same pose, with arms out to the side as if it is shrugging. Typically it is shown crouching on top of a mountain, showing where the yokai can be found in the wild. The depiction on this scroll differs from typical illustrations in that regard. It is usually shown with gray fur, a peach-colored belly, floppy ears, a large grin, and arms outstretched.

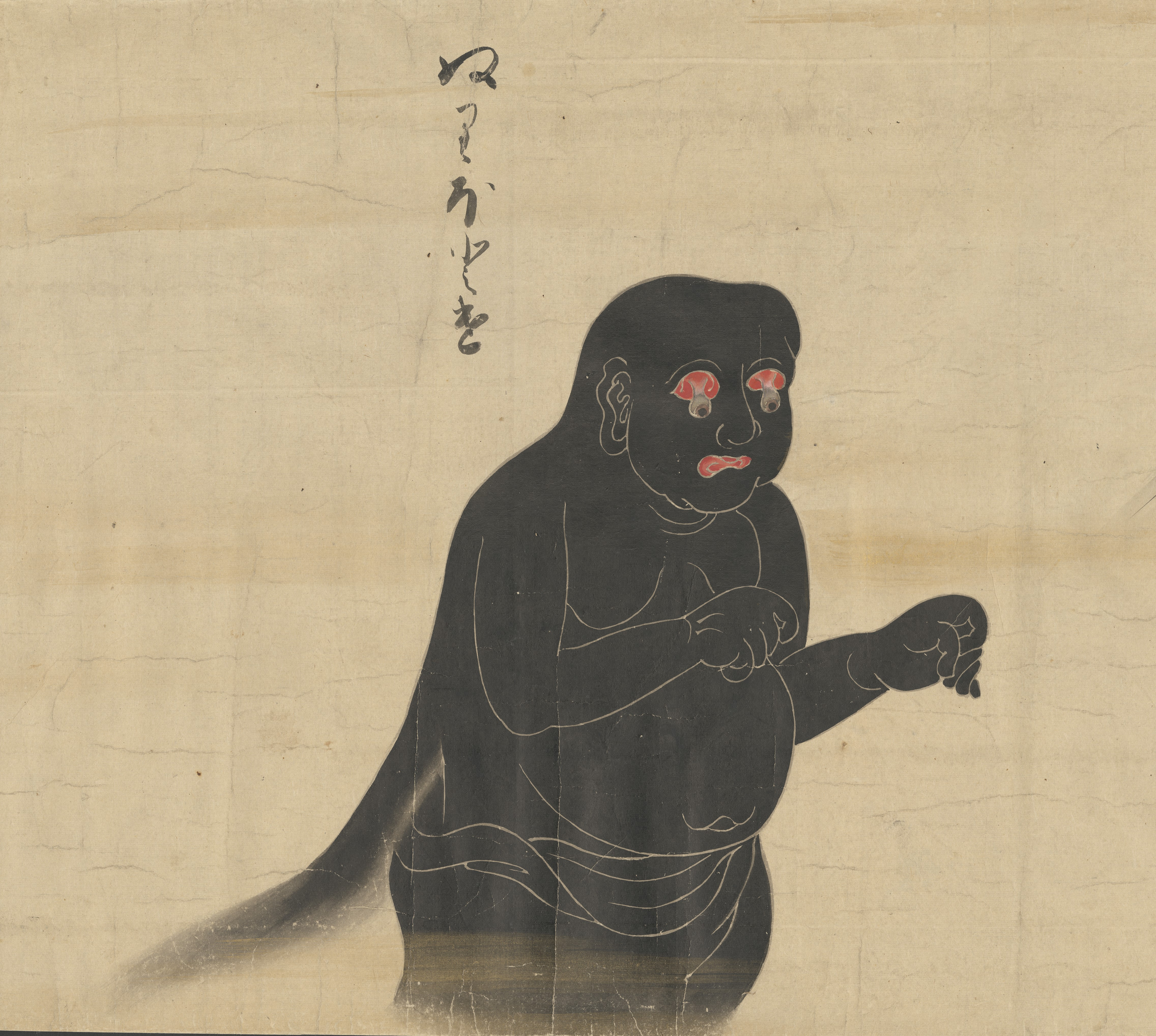
17 Nuribotoke (ぬりぼとけ）is a yōkai that resembles an animated corpse. Distinguishing attributes in most depictions are its pitch black color and its droopy, dangling eyeballs. Its name means "lacquered Buddha", although the term for Buddha (hotoke) can also be used for people who have died, since it is believed that they, too, become a buddha. This yōkai is commonly said to appear at night out of a butsudan (Buddhist shrine) that has been left open overnight or otherwise poorly maintained. In such cases, it has been shown to crawl out of the butsudan in order to cause havoc. Some reports say that when it appears, it is simply to repair and maintain the butsudan itself; however, more mischievous and violent acts have also been seen. One interesting aspect of the Nuribotoke's appearance is the black appendage that can be seen coming from its back, which is widely debated. Many depictions, including this scroll, show it to be hair. Many of these portrayals are from the Edo period. However, there are also many records showing this yokai to actually have a catfish-like tail coming from its back.

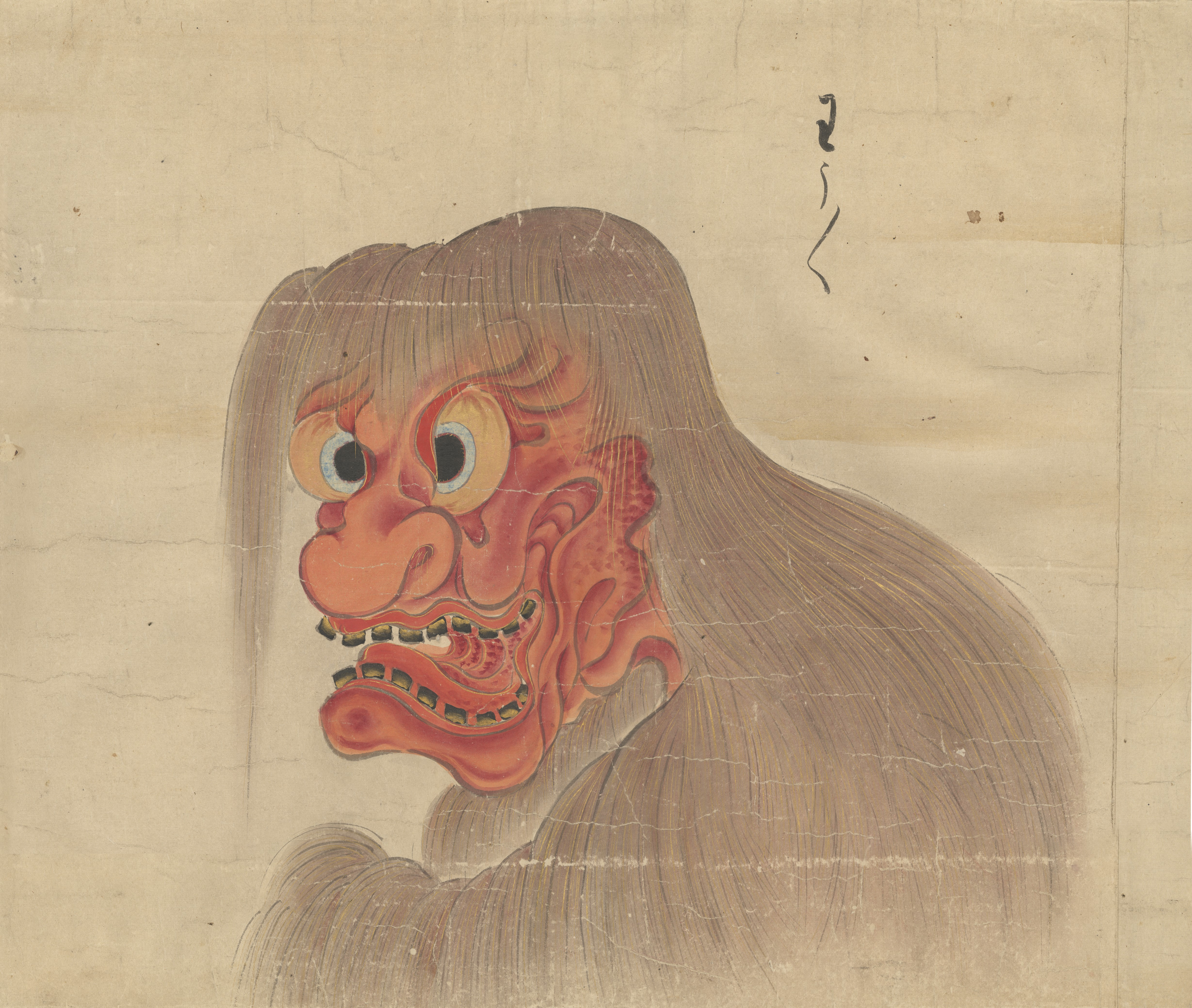
18 Wauwau (わうわう), also known as Ouni (苧うに), is a yōkai similar in features and behavior to Yamamba (or Yama-uba), a female with demon-like facial features, blackened teeth, and long hair covering her body. Some local legends say that she will appear to women who are weaving or spinning thread, offer to help, spin at a supernatural pace, then disappear mysteriously.

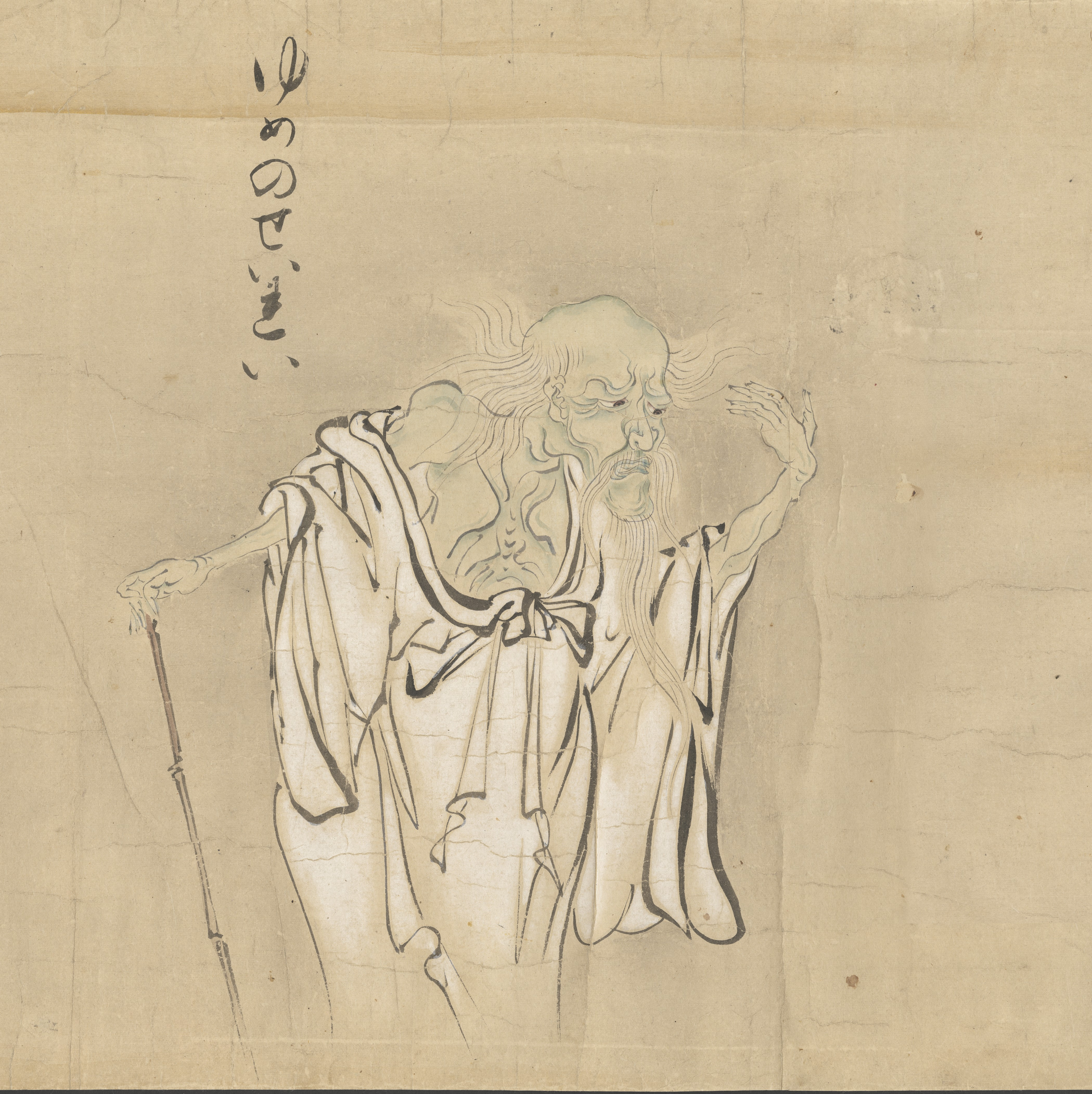
19 Yume no seirei (ゆめのせいれい) or "dream spirit", is a mysterious yōkai believed to cause nightmares. Belief in the supernatural was particularly strong during the Heian and Edo periods. During this time, many believed that the spirits of the dead caused a multitude of evils for the living. On certain nights, demons and ghosts would move in a haunting procession from dusk to dawn, known as the Hyakki yakō, or night procession of one hundred demons. Occasionally, Yume no seirei appears in this procession. He appears in the Hyakkai Zukan, "The Illustrated Volume of a Hundred Demons," created by Sawaki Sūshi in 1737. Artists depict Yume no seirei as an emaciated, elderly man. He wears a loose white robe, which reveals his frail body and exposed rib cage. His thin wispy hair flows behind him in a ghostly motion. In his right hand he holds a cane and with his left he reaches out, beckoning. The bottom half of his body eerily fades away as if he is disappearing. His appearance is similar to the description of the female ghosts (yūrei).

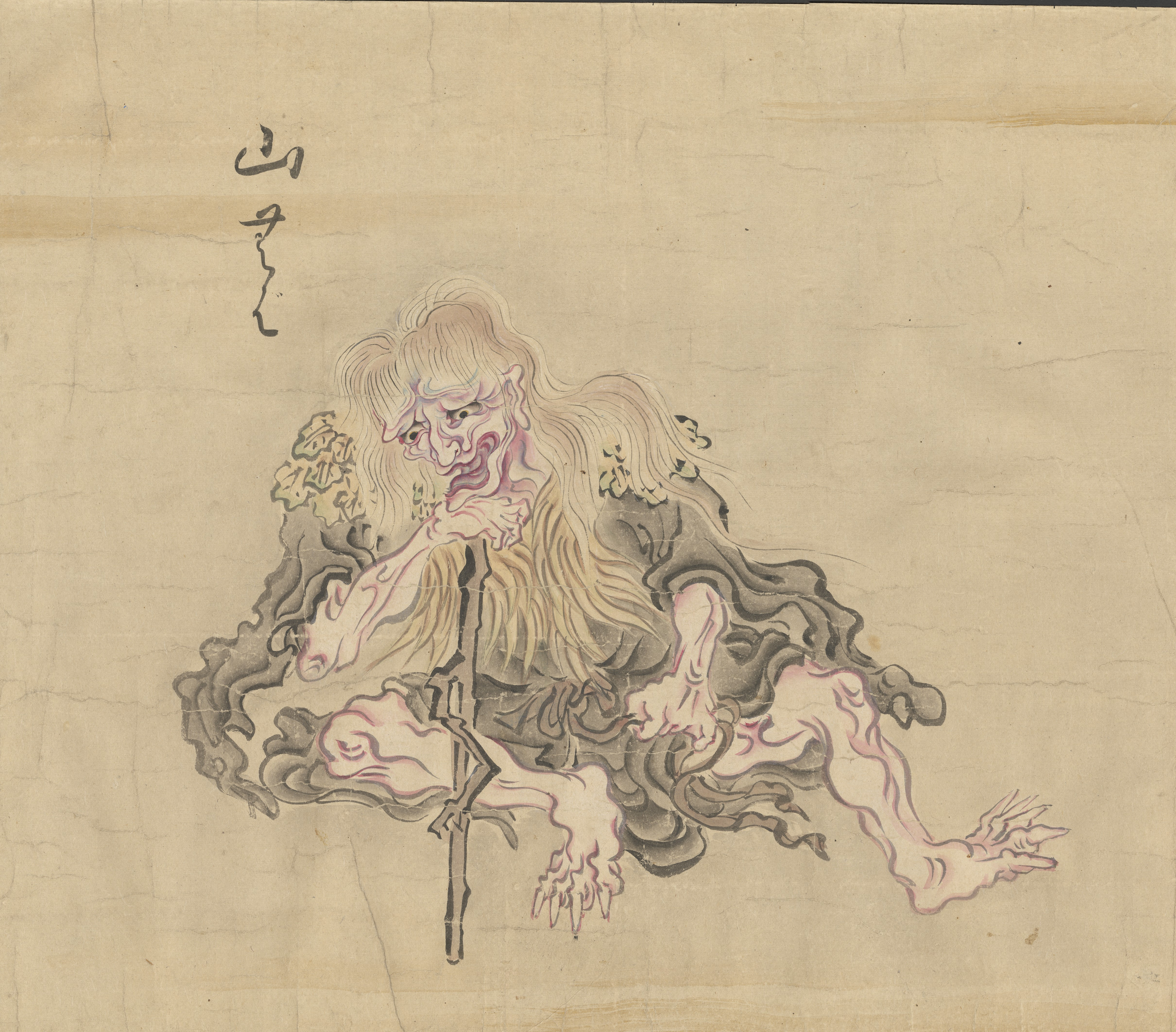
20 Yamamba (山んば) is a Japanese yōkai also known as Yamauba (山うば), Onibaba (鬼婆), Yama-onna (山女), Yama-hime (山姫), and Kijo (鬼女). Yamamba are female yōkai that live alone in mountain huts. They occasionally offer a place to sleep for the night to travelers in the form of an old woman or beautiful young woman. After their guests fall asleep, they transform into their true form and eat their guests. Stories of yamamba encounters have been spread through those lucky enough to escape. Stories of yamamba are often bedtime stories for children warning them to not go near the mountains. In classic folklore, yamamba typically preys on travelers and merchants such as ox-drivers, horse drivers, and coopers, who often travel between villages and walk through the mountains. They are thought to have widely spread the tales of yamamba. Yamamba are typically portrayed in two ways. There are tales in which yamamba is a fearful monster that attacks and eats travelers, and tales in which yamamba is a benevolent yōkai that gives good fortune to people who were kind to her.

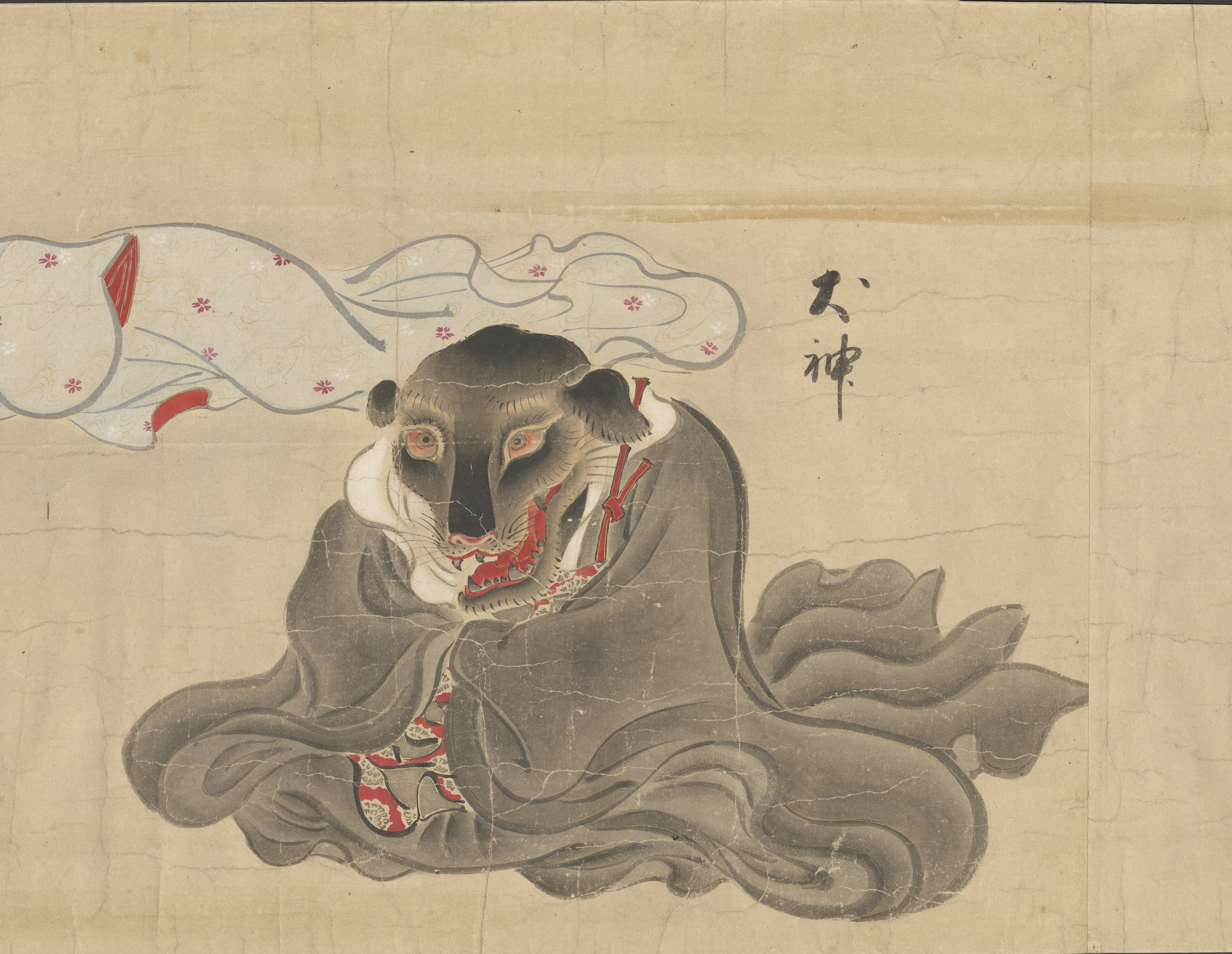
21 Inugami (犬神) is a possession spirit similar to foxes (kitsune) but is located in places where foxes are absent, primarily in western Japan and the island of Shikoku. They can curse, possess, or protect humans. If one desires protection from an inugami, there are a few methods, such as tying the neck of a starving dog as someone performs a ritual, after which an inugami will follow the person. Inugami are inherited and follow the family to protect the family. Only that family will be able to see the inugami and these families are called "inugami-mochi," meaning "those that hold inugami". If the inugami is mistreated harshly by its master, it will curse the master. If someone is possessed by an inugami, they will have dog-like behaviors such as howling or sleeping like a dog. They will have a great pain in their chest, and they will need to be exorcised by a professional.

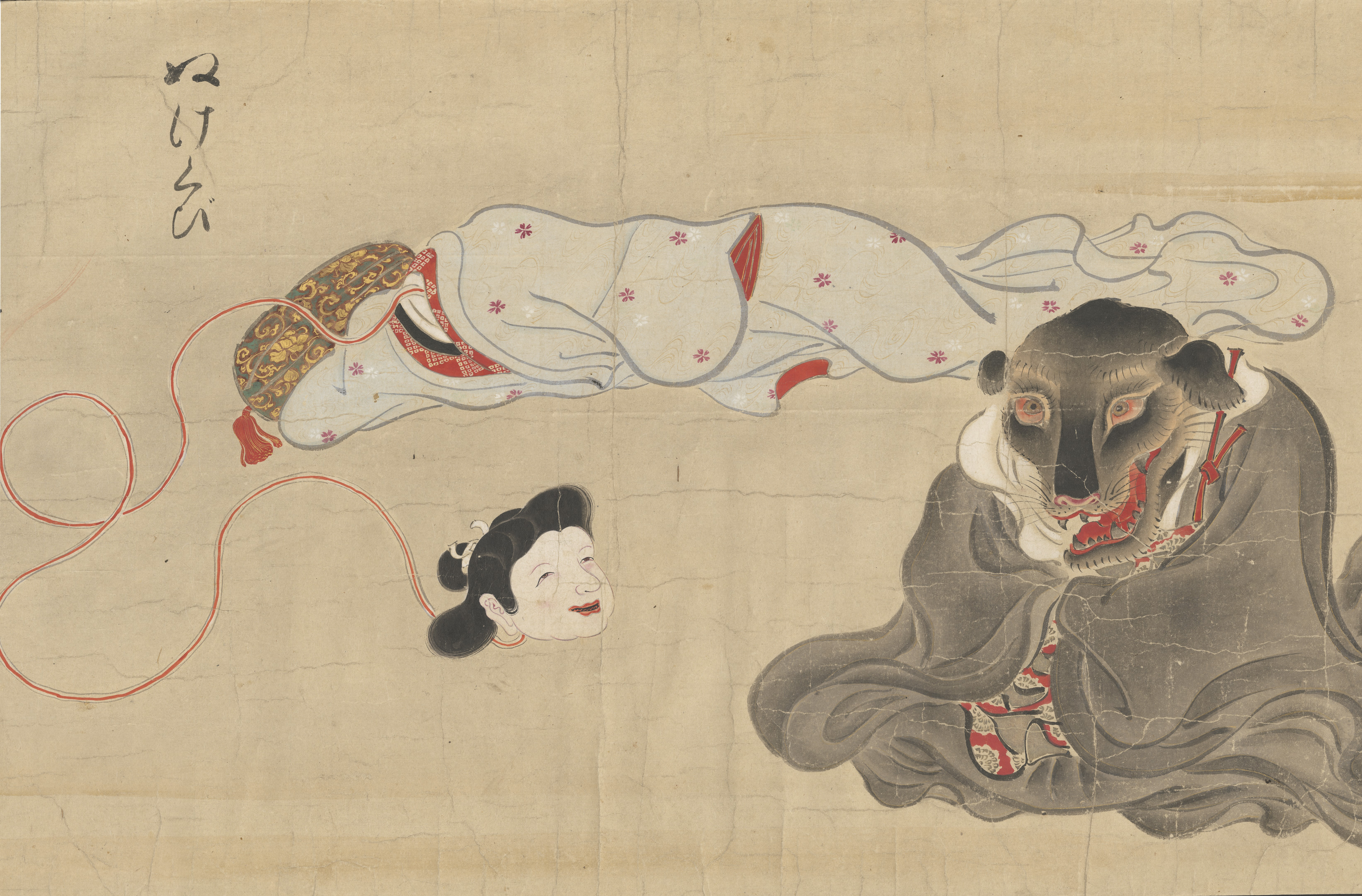
22 Nukekubi (ぬけくび) are female yōkai whose heads detach from their bodies at night to hunt and prey on human blood. Their heads can either detach completely or remain attached by a string-like neck. They are a variation of the Rokurokubi (轆轤首) yōkai. Nukekubi are ordinary women by day but bloodthirsty hunters at night, all without their knowledge. Their methods of hunting include sucking their victims' blood or biting them. The curse of Nukekubi is often spread from mothers to daughters, and there is no certain cure. Stories of the Nukekubi appear as early as the Heian period.

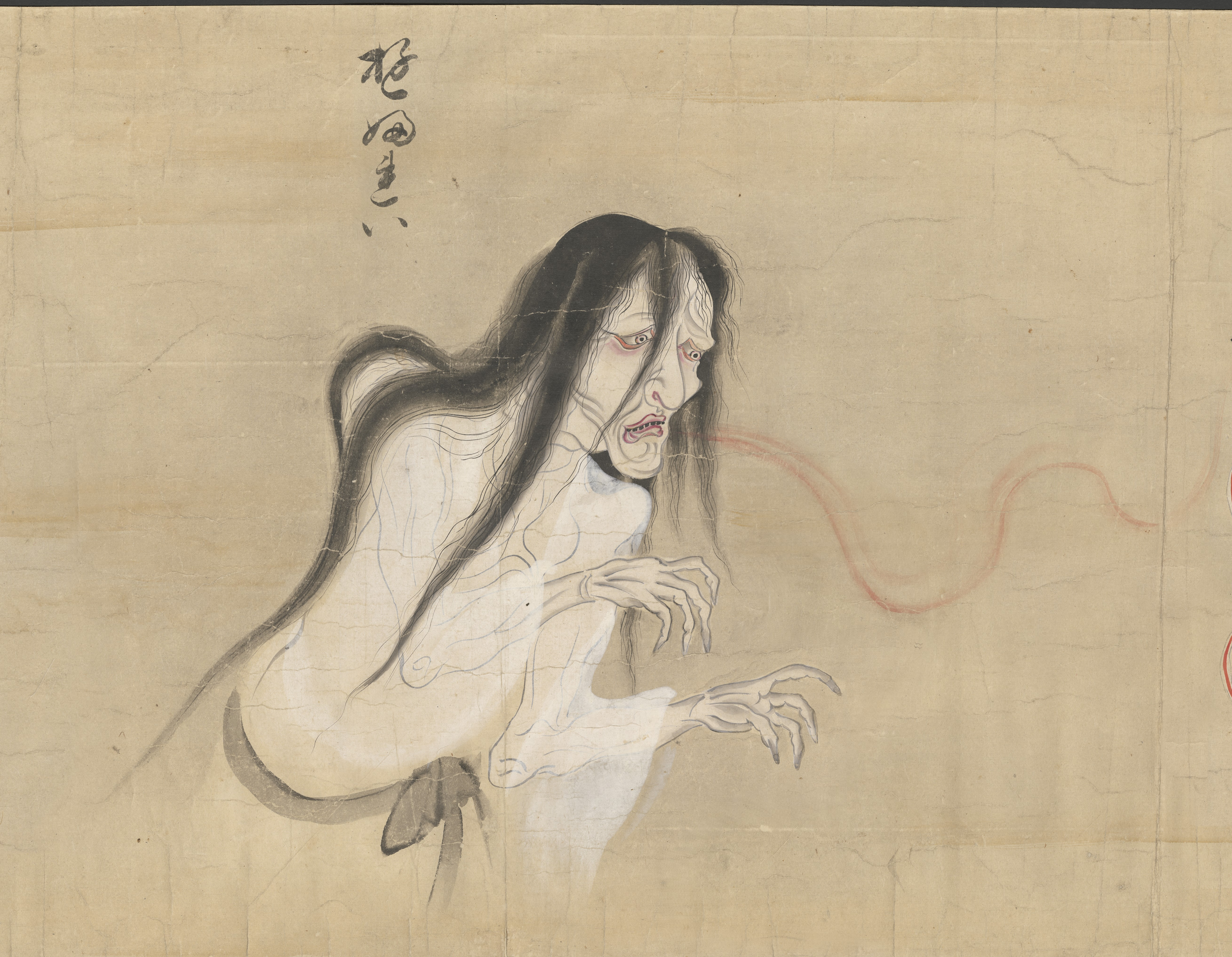
23 Yūrei (ゆうれい) means "faint spirit". Generally speaking, a yūrei is the spirit of a person who has died, usually appearing as they did in life. Yūrei refers to the spirits of humans who do not cross over to the other side and remain in the human world for personal reasons or because the funeral or burial rites were not sufficient or satisfactory. The typical yūrei, as depicted in art and literature, is described as a woman with long, disheveled black hair obstructing the face, wearing burial clothing, with curved dangling hands and no feet.

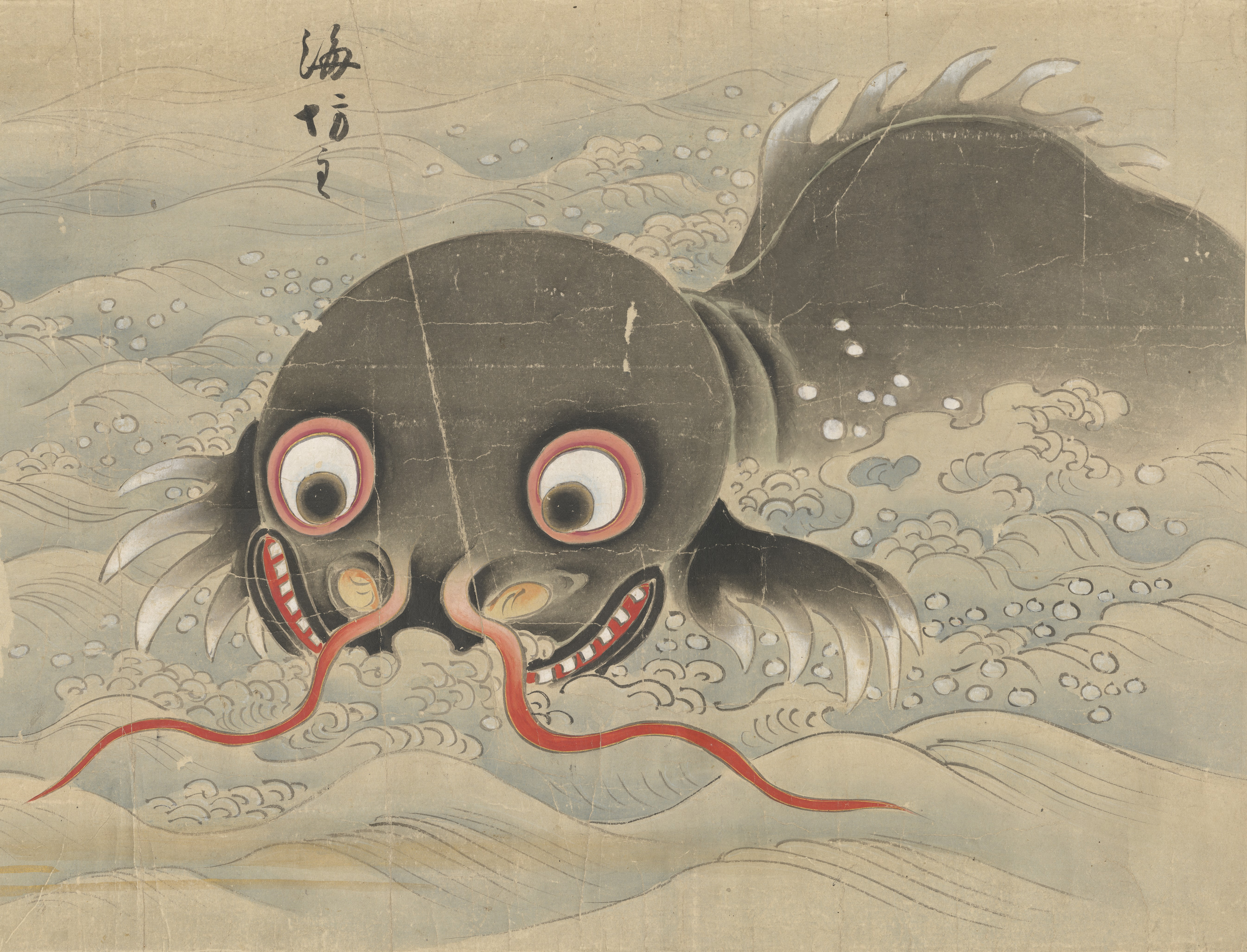
24 Umibōzu (海坊主) is a yōkai from Japanese folklore. Little is known of the origin of umibōzu, but it is a sea-spirit and as such has multiple sightings throughout Japan. Normally, umibōzu appears to sailors on calm seas which quickly turn tumultuous. It either breaks the ship on emergence or demands a bucket or barrel from the sailors and proceeds to drown them. The only safe way to escape an umibōzu is to give it a bottomless barrel and sail away while it is confused. It often appears as a humanoid shape with a shaved head and piercing eyes, much like that of a buddha.

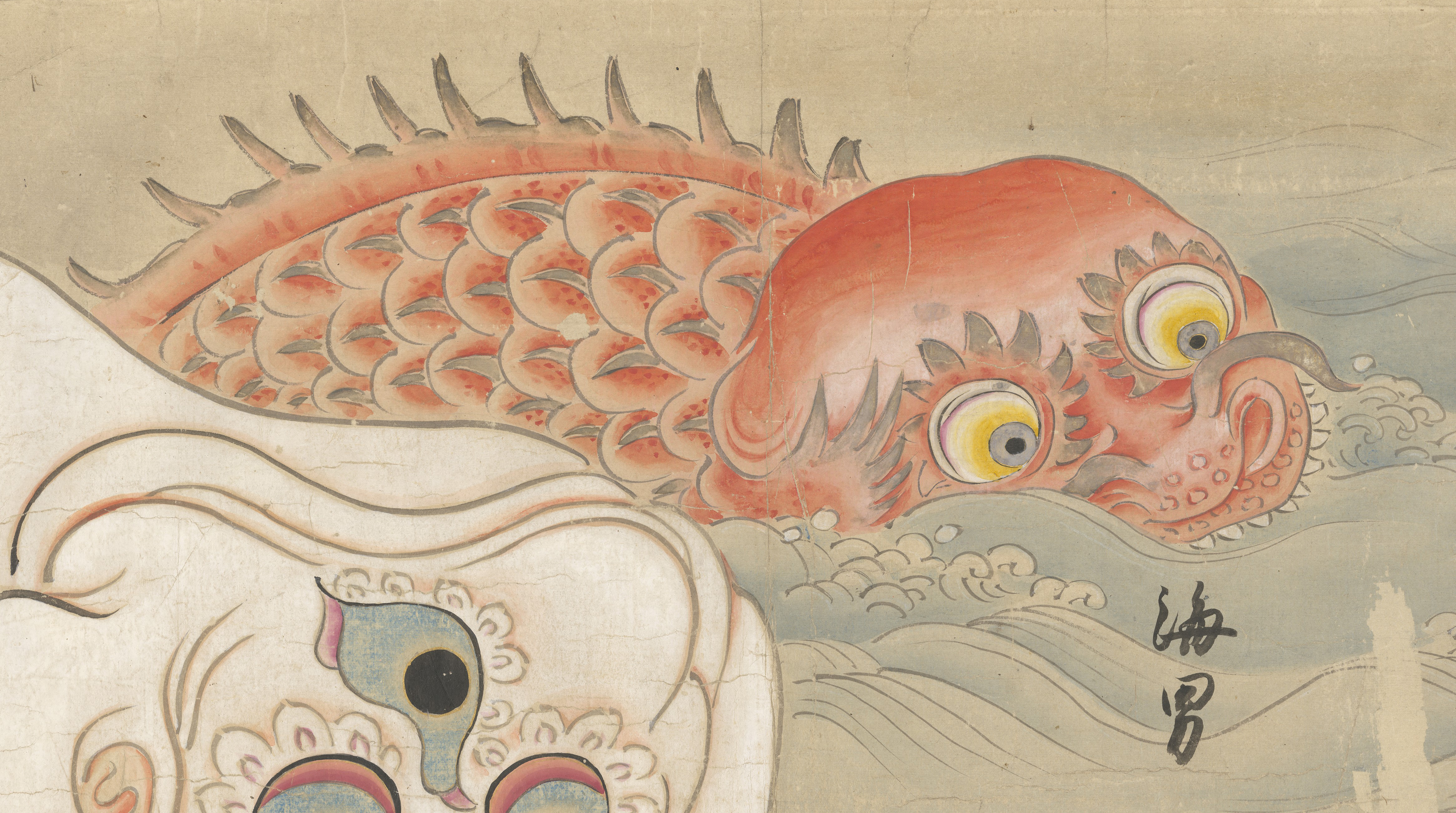
25 Umiotoko (海男) is a yet to be described Japanese yōkai. It appears only in Bakemono no e and an 1802 scroll by Kanō Yoshinobu in the collection of Yumoto Kōichi, though it is unlabeled in the Kanō scroll. Its appearance resembles that of umibōzu in Bakemono no e, though with red scales and yellow eyes.

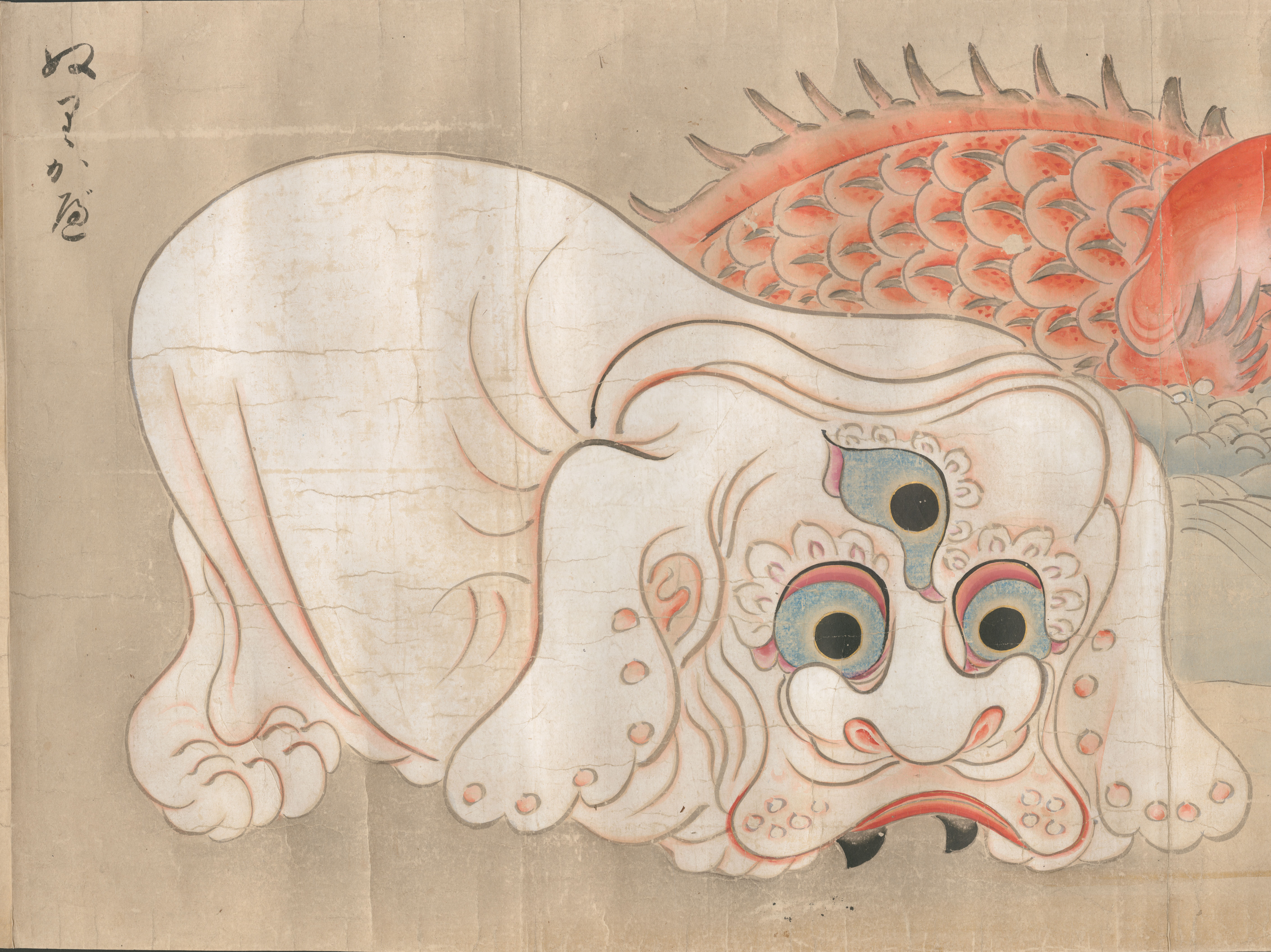
26 Nurikabe (ぬりかべ) is a Japanese yōkai. It is an inexplicable phenomenon that impedes a traveler's progress as if it were an invisible wall. Nurikabe means "painted wall" or "plastered wall." Until Japanese scholars were introduced to the Bakemono no e scroll in 2007, it was thought that Nurikabe had not been illustrated before the modern era. Folklorist Kunio Yanagita had recorded oral traditions concerning Nurikabe in Fukuoka prefecture on the island of Kyūshū and published his findings in 1933. Shigeru Mizuki based his illustration of nurikabe in his famous manga series GeGeGe no Kitarō on Yanagita's description, and was surprised and pleased when he found out that nurikabe had indeed been illustrated in the Edo period. Some Japanese scholars, however, contend that the nurikabe illustrated in Bakemono no e and the nurikabe of folklore in Kyūshū are not the same. The Nurikabe in Bakemono no e resembles a white elephant without a trunk, or perhaps a white lion-dog, or komainu, with three eyes and black fangs.

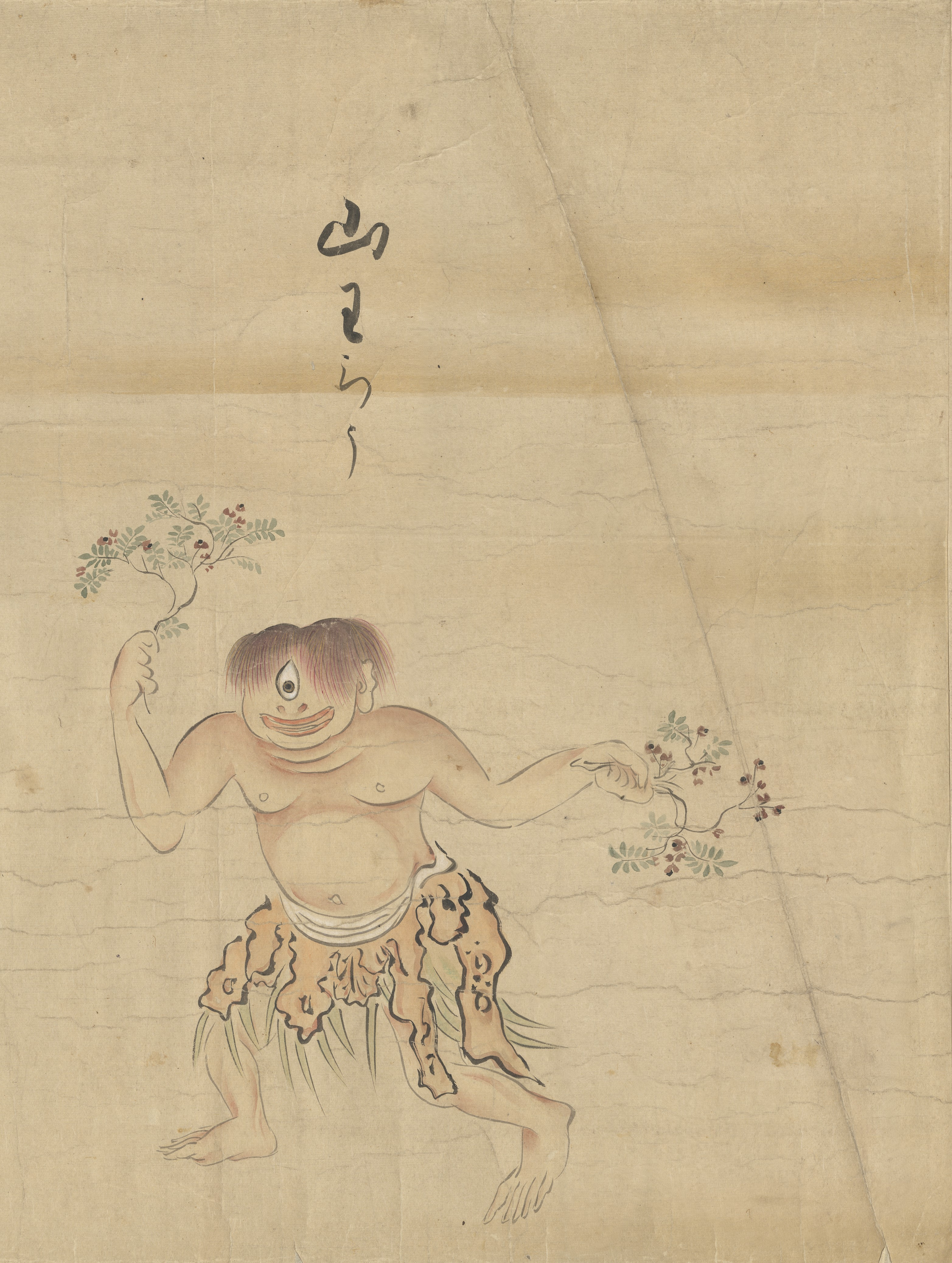
27 Yamawarō (山わろう) are Japanese yōkai that live in the mountains and are more frequently found in the western part of Japan. They are said to resemble a young boy about 10 years old and are usually depicted with scraggly brown or red hair covering their bodies and one eye (although this is not always the case). Yamawarō are skilled at mimicry, and imitate sounds of the forest such as falling trees. They can even learn to imitate the sound of a human voice, both speaking and singing. Yamawarō were often encountered by woodsmen, and it was said that they would aid in the task of woodcutting if rewarded properly (usually with food). However, one had to be careful of offering too little food or offering it too soon. In the case of too little food, the yamawarō would become angry and leave, never to return, while in the case of it being offered too soon, the yamawarō would simply take the food and leave before completing any work. There are also legends that say that yamawarō are also garappa or kappa during the springtime, when they repose in the different beds of water throughout Japan, but once fall ends they retreat into the mountains to become yamawarō.

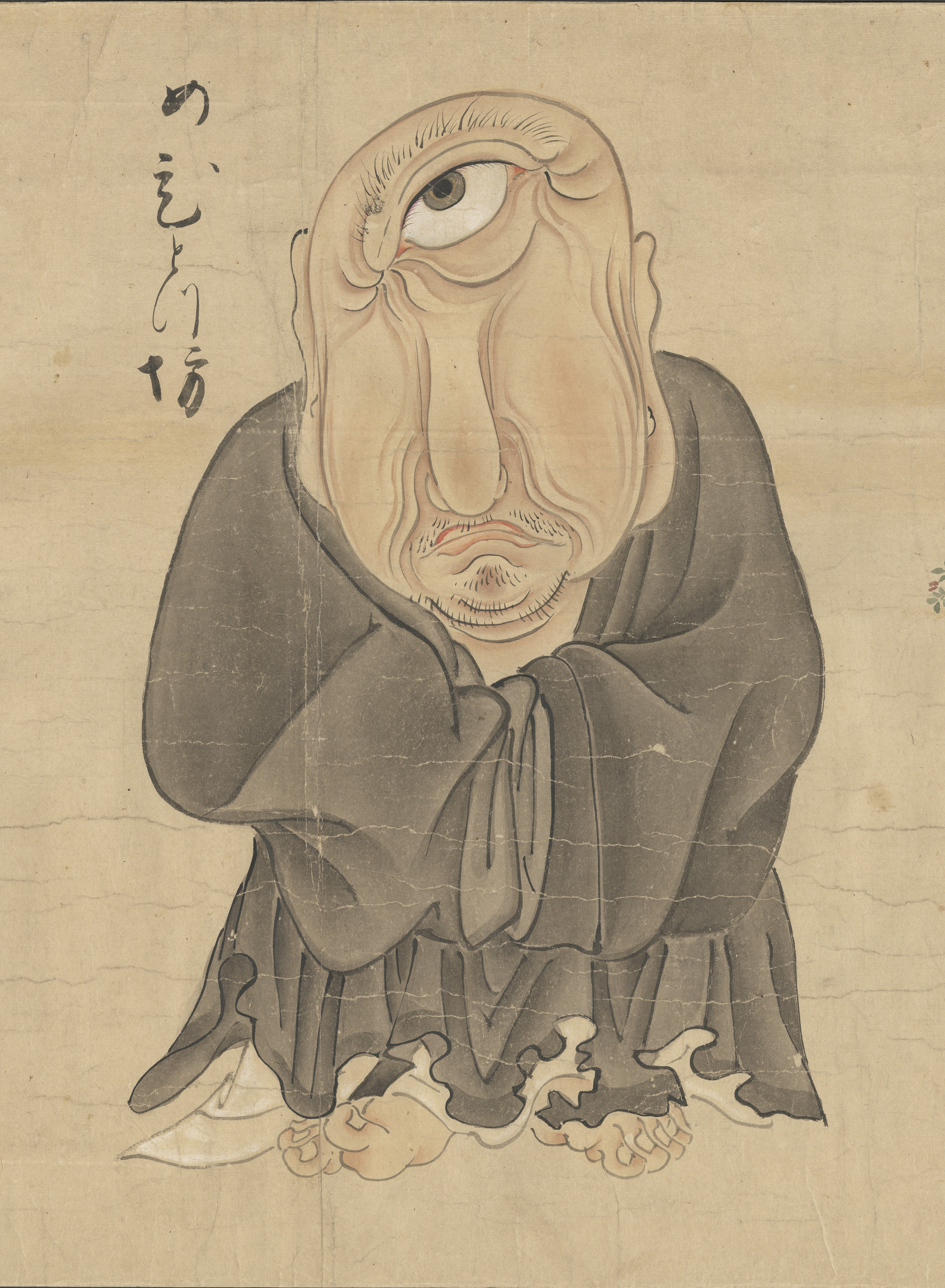
28 Mehitotsubō (めひとつ坊) means "Buddhist priest with one eye". Everything about his appearance is like a normal priest, except for the one eye in the middle of his face. He wears the black-and-white robes of a priest. He does not wear sandals, leaving his bare feet visible. His head is bald like a monk. He also has a long and ugly nose and face. His chin and face have black unshaven hairs growing, but they are not quite a beard or mustache. He also has one large eyebrow above his single eye.

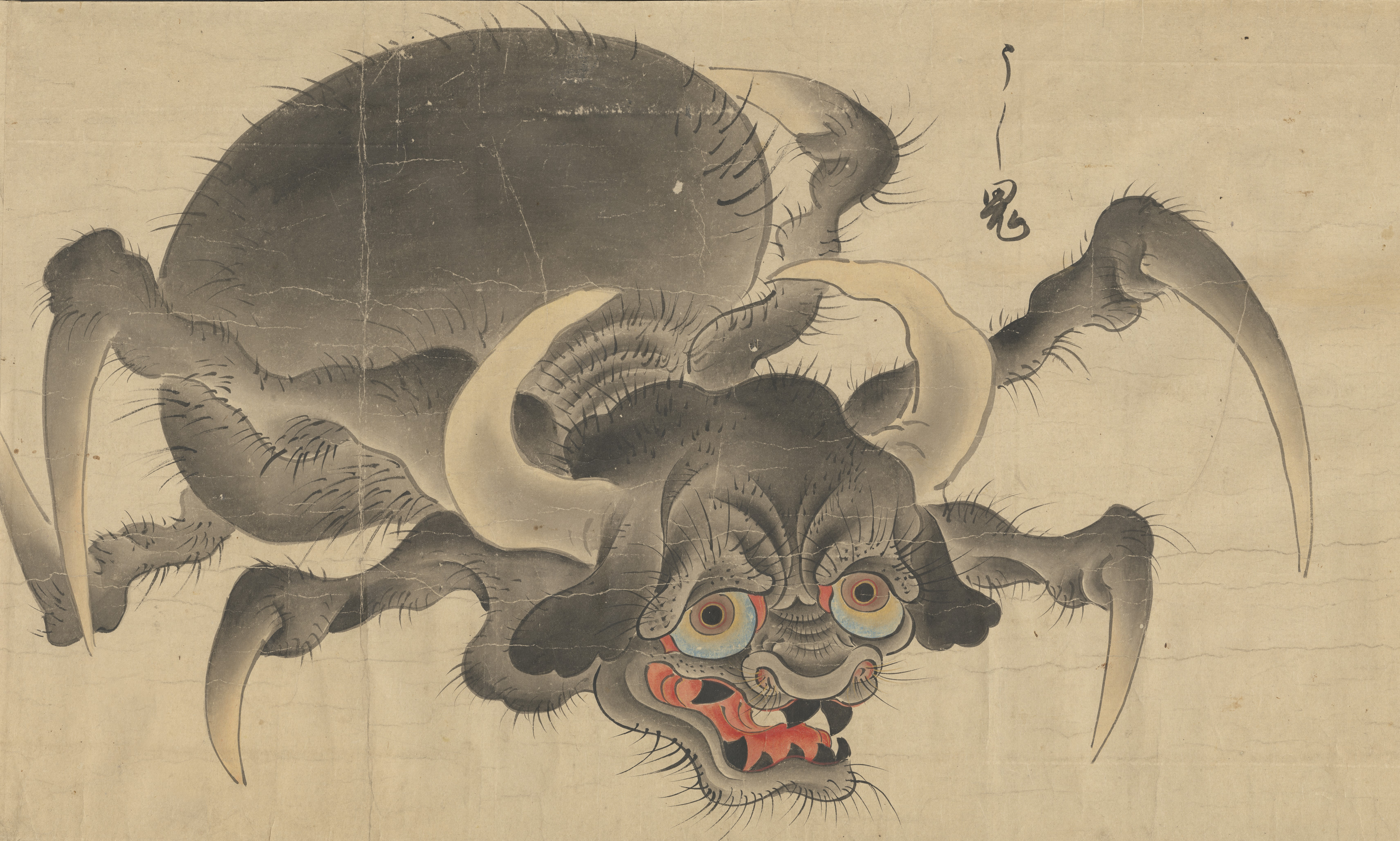
29 Ushi-oni (うし鬼) is a yōkai in traditional Japanese folklore, and its name is translated as "ox demon". The ushi-oni mostly resides near bodies of water, and it is known for attacking and terrorizing people. The appearance of the ushi-oni may vary depending on legend or region of habitat, but it most commonly has the head of an ox with some oni-like attributes, sharp horns curving upward, and sharp fangs. The body is most commonly depicted as spider-like with six legs, each ending with long singular claws. Though tales of the ushi-oni's terrors vary, it is commonly characterized by tenacity, ferocity, and a carnivorous diet which includes humans. The Ushi-oni also cooperates with Nure-onna (ぬれ女) or Iso-onna (磯女) to secure its prey.

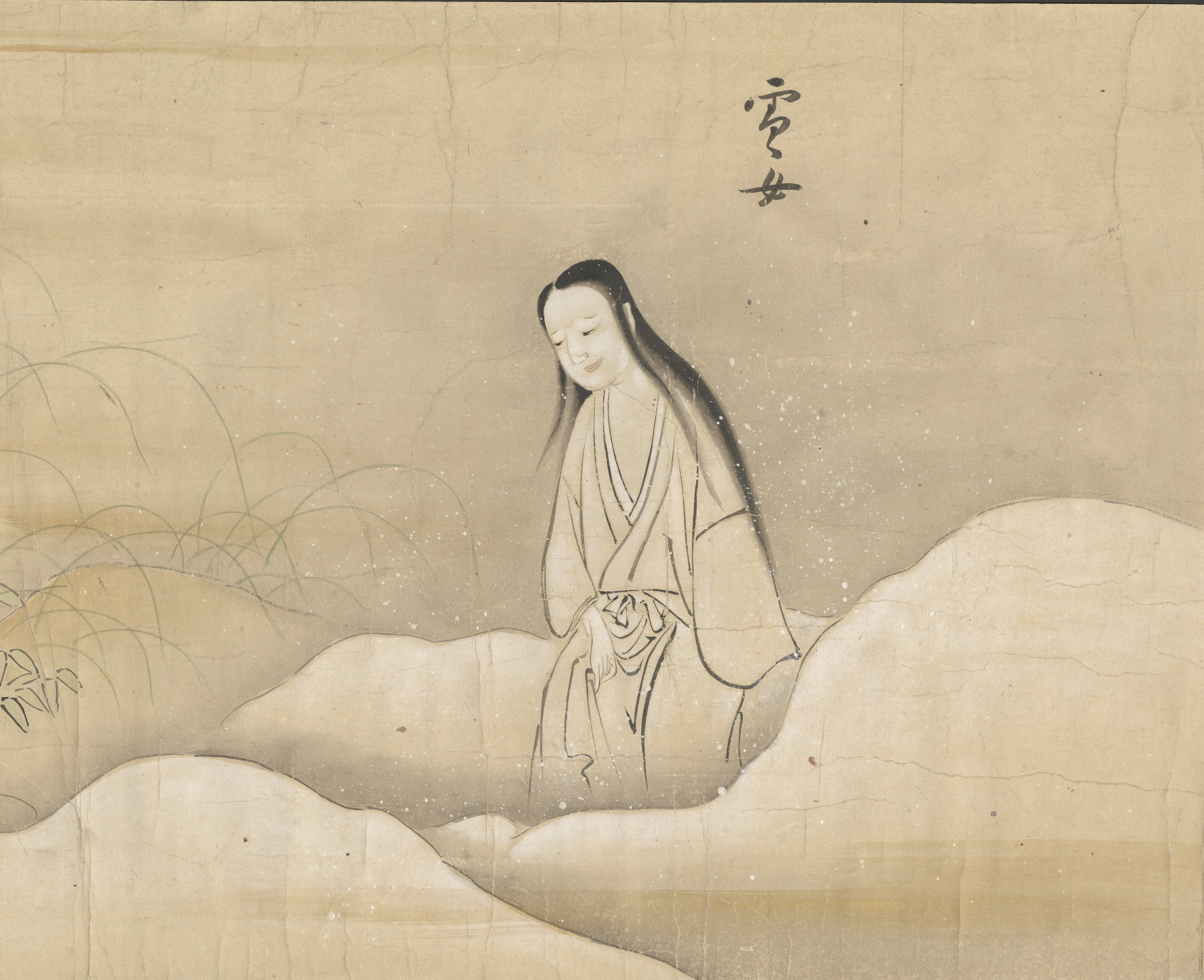
30 Yuki-onna (雪女), meaning snow woman, is a yōkai which usually appears on snowy winter nights. She is described as beautiful with pale white or bluish-white skin cold to the touch and dressed in white. Some believe she is simply an embodiment of snow, both dangerous and serene. Others believe that she is a spirit who died because of snow, a fallen heavenly being, or a form of some other shape-shifting yōkai.

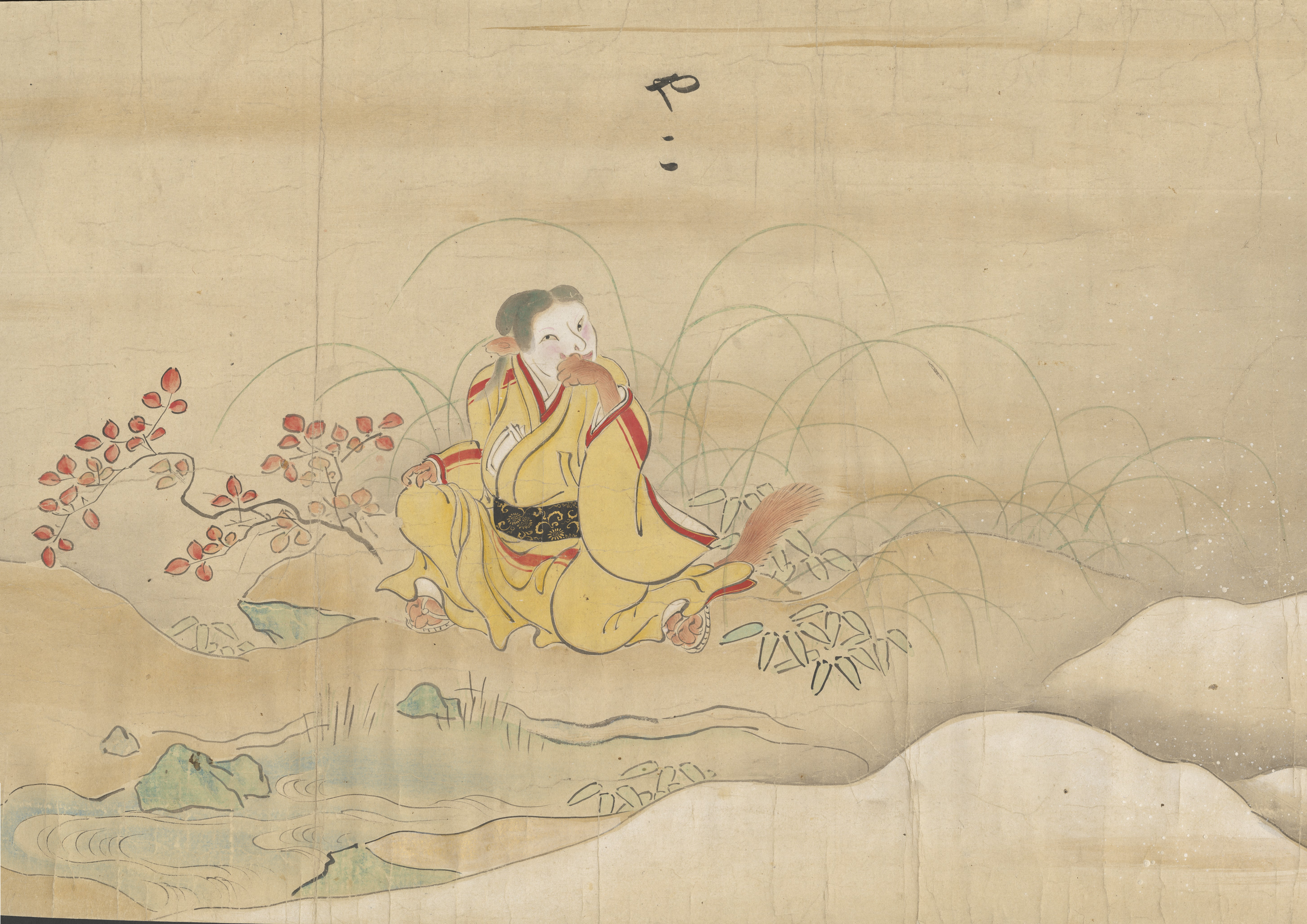
31 Yako (やこ) is a name that refers to a yōkai or bakemono connected with foxes and fox possessions. The specific term "yako" is used predominantly in Kyūshū, Japan, but these fox yōkai are also known by other names such as nogitsune or kitsune. The yako are very similar in appearance to foxes, but typically are black or white in color and are also much smaller in size, being more comparable to a cat or weasel. While there are some kitsune who are servants of the Inari god, worshiped and benevolent towards humans, the yako are neither controlled nor worshiped. Because of this, they may possess people, causing illness or other harm to them. The yako is also said to have the ability to shapeshift into forms in order to startle or trick humans. They are most often recorded as shifting into the form of a beautiful young woman.

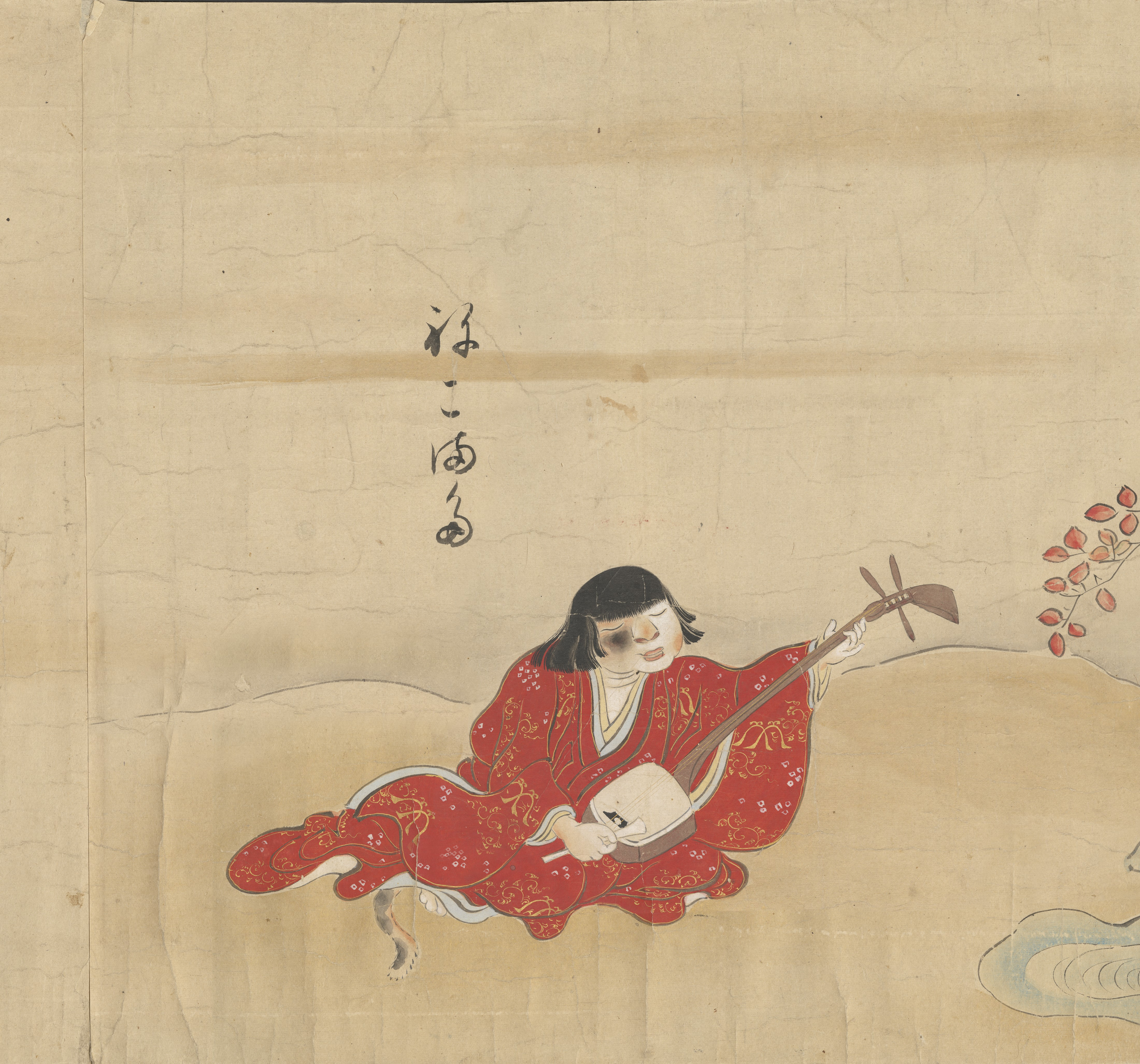
32 Nekomata (ねこまた) are Japanese yōkai said to have transformed from old and large cats. Some of the defining physical characteristics of the nekomata are that when these cats transform from ordinary animals into yōkai, their tails split down the middle into two identical tails. Legend has it that these monster cats have special powers, and can usually be seen speaking human languages as well as walking on their rear legs, causing mischief. In order to be able to eat, these monster cats are rumored to grow to huge sizes to be able to hunt and prey on many large animals such as wild boar, dogs, bears, and even humans. Some other mysterious powers that nekomata hold include: summoning fireballs, setting fires with their tails, controlling the dead, and cursing and killing their previous owners if they see fit.

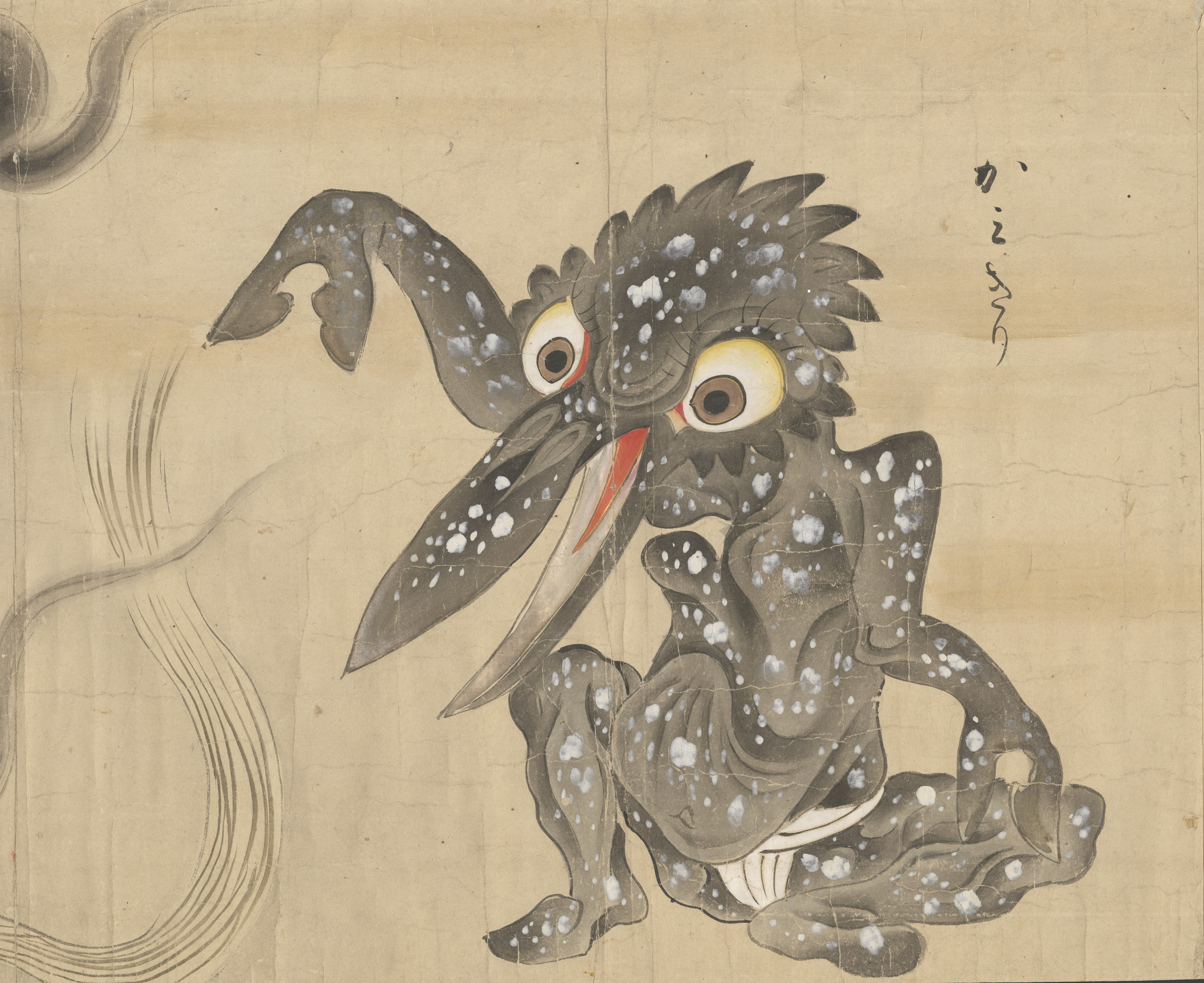
33 Kamikiri (かみきり) are yōkai that have insect-like characteristics with scissor-like hands and a long beak. They are known for using their scissor-like hands to cut an unsuspecting victim's hair off without warning or motive. Not much is actually known about kamikiri because there has not been a single documented eye-witness account, which might be partially due to the fact that some victims of kamikiri attacks do not realize their hair has been cut until much later. Kamikiri are often depicted in scrolls with a sumo wrestler-type mawashi girded about its loins as it cuts a lock of hair. Kamikiri tend to target young women more so than men, though they have been known to attack men as well. They are especially prone to attack at twilight and in urban areas in places such as dark alleys, bedrooms and, most commonly, bathrooms. Hair in the Edo period of Japan was a symbol of wealth and status, while cutting one's hair was symbolic of becoming a monk or nun, so to have one's hair cut against one's will would have been an extremely unfortunate and terrifying ordeal.

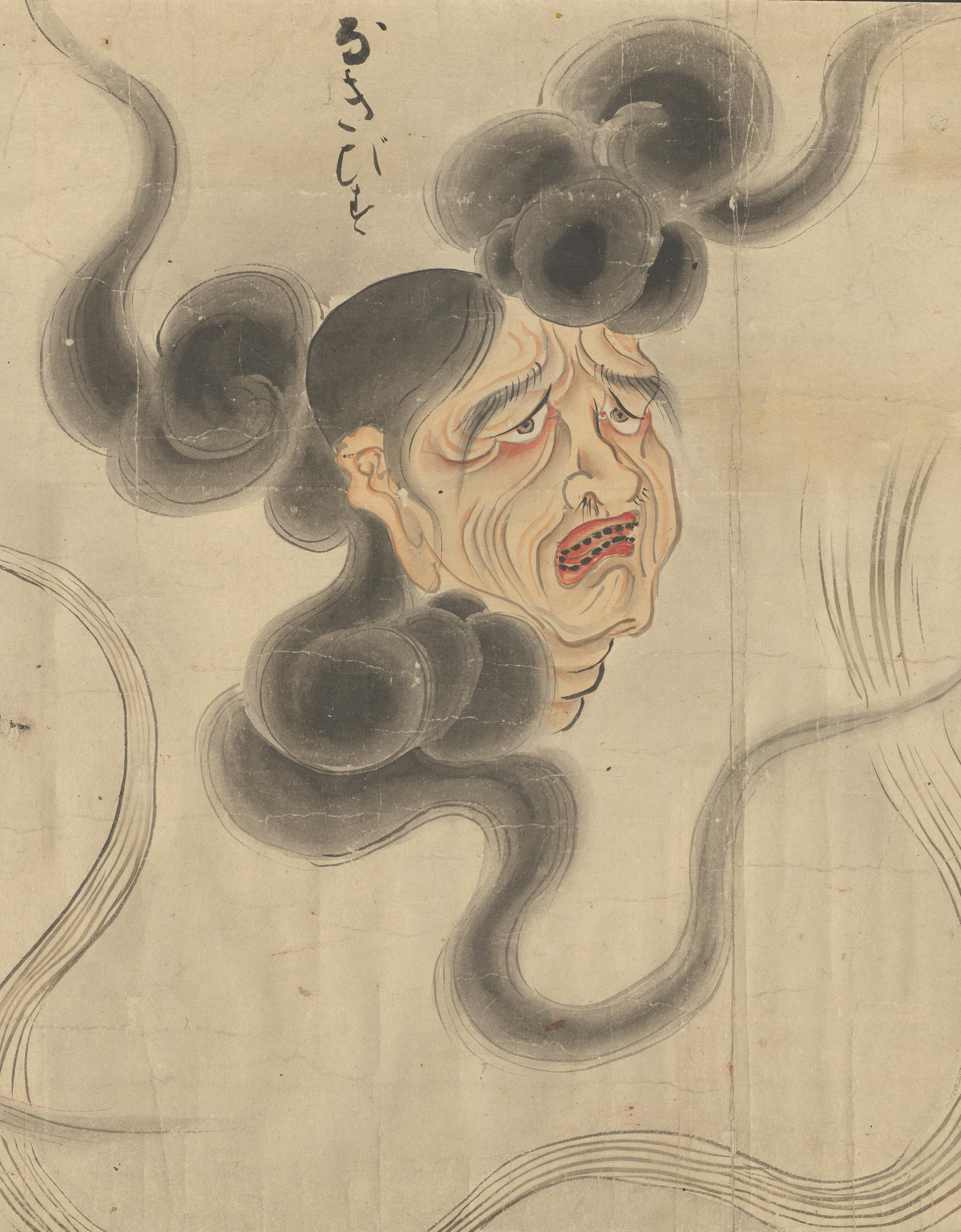
34 Nakibisu (なきびす) is a regional dialect form of nakibeso, meaning "one prone to cry." One other illustration of Nakibisu is known. It is part of a handscroll by the Kyoto artist Murata Ryūtei (村田龍亭, ?-?) titled Hyakki emaki (百鬼絵巻, "Picture scroll of one hundred demons"). The colophon of this scroll is dated 1764.

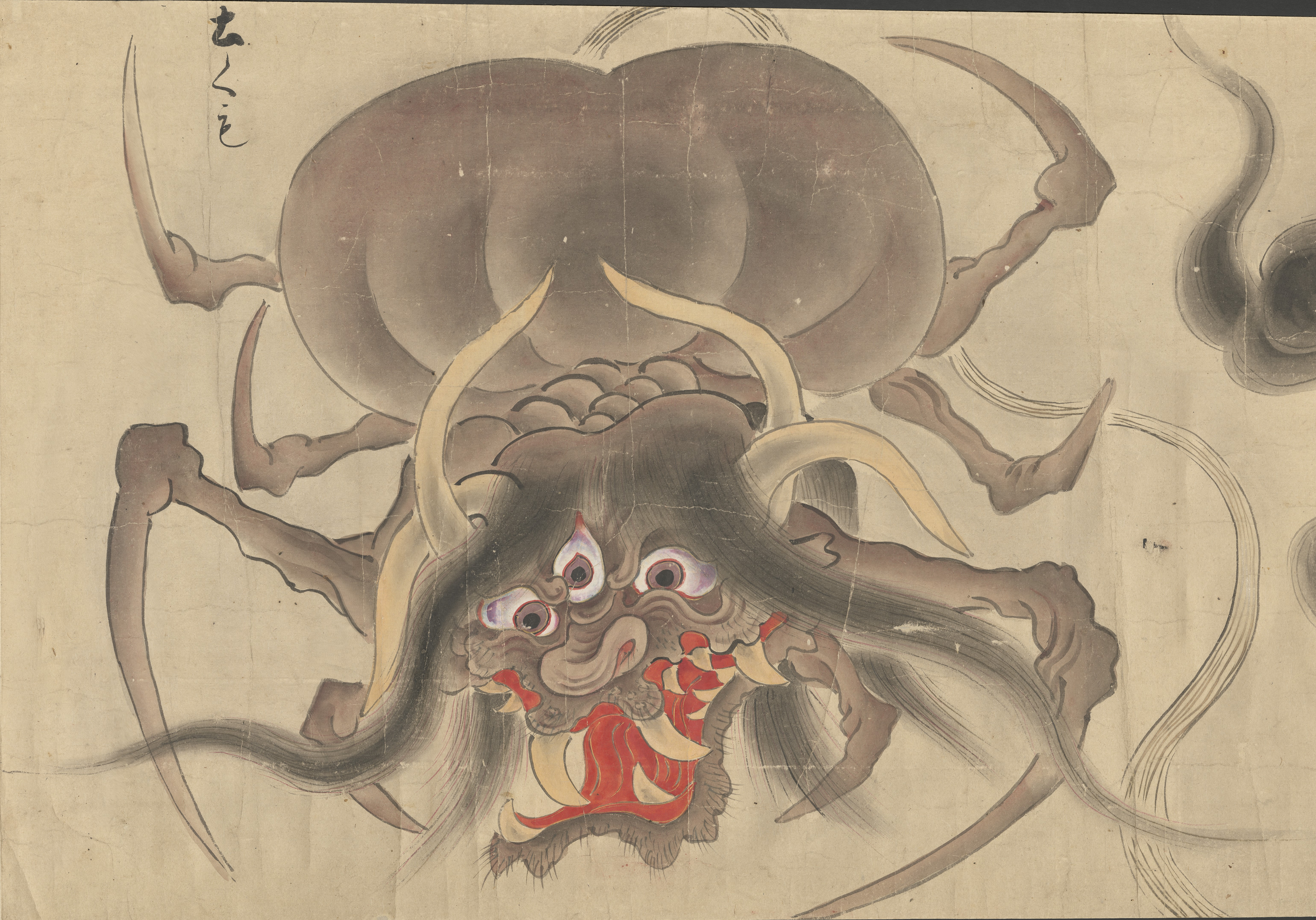
35 Tsuchigumo (土ぐも) means "ground spider." It is also commonly referred to as yatsukahagi or ōgumo (giant spider). Its habitat is rural areas, mountains, forests, and caves, but they are found to live everywhere. Tsuchigumo make homes out of silk tubes from which they attack their prey. The diet of tsuchigumo includes humans, animals, and anything that it can trap. Some tsuchigumo are depicted as spiders with the face of a demon and the body of a tiger. Historically, "tsuchigumo" was used as a derogatory word in Japanese for renegade local clans. In ancient Japan, aborigines who defied central authority were referred to as "tsuchigumo." They are commonly identified as people with different customs, manners, and physiological features from the general population. Therefore, using this definition, they are one of the most ancient types of oni (demon).
