= Masaharu Anesaki =

Japanese intellectual and scholar (1873–1949)

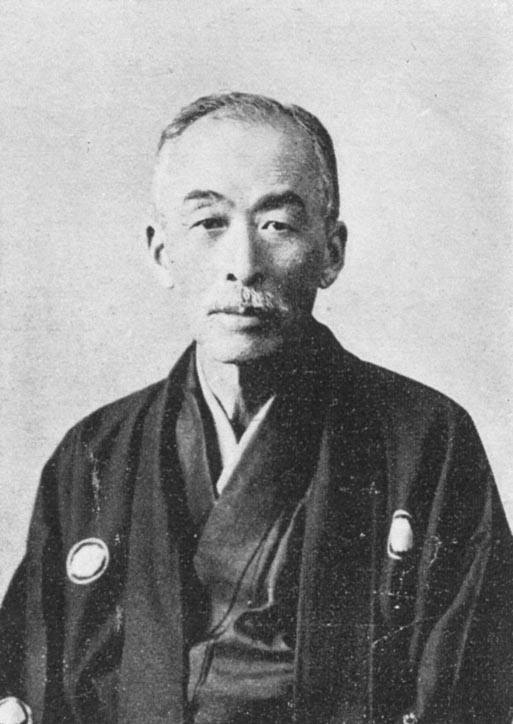
- Masaharu Anesaki
- Born: July 25, 1873; Kyoto
- Died: July 23, 1949 (aged 75); Tokyo
- Resting place: Japan
- Other name: Anesaki Chōfū
- Occupations: Philosopher, scholar of comparative religion, member of House of Peers

Masaharu Anesaki (姉崎 正治, Anesaki Masaharu; born July 25, 1873 – July 23, 1949), also known under his pen name "Chōfū Anesaki" (姉崎 嘲風, Anesaki Chōfū), was a leading Japanese intellectual and scholar of the Meiji period. Anesaki is credited as being the father of religious studies in Japan, but also wrote on a variety of subjects including culture, literature, and politics. He was also a member of the International Committee on Intellectual Cooperation of the League of Nations.

== Biography ==
=== Early history and education ===
Masaharu Anesaki was born in Kyoto. His family was the Samurai class served at Katsura-no-miya. In his younger days, he studied English at a private "Oriental School", built by Kinzo Hirai, a Buddhist social worker. He received higher education in the Third High School, and entered the Tokyo Imperial University in 1893. He majored in philosophy, and his teacher was Tetsujirō Inoue and Raphael von Koeber. He graduated from university in 1897.

=== After graduation ===
He started teaching comparative religion at Tetsugaku Kan in 1897. In 1900, he went studying abroad, and spent three years in India and Europe (1900–1903). During this time he studied under Paul Deussen, Hermann Oldenberg, and Albrecht Weber in Germany, as well as Thomas William Rhys Davids in England.

He spent more than another year abroad in 1908–09 with partial support from Albert Kahn, the French philanthropist. During that time he traveled extensively through Italy, tracing the steps of Saint Francis of Assisi. His travelogue "Hanatsumi Nikki" (Flowers of Italy) recounts that journey.

He spent 1913 to 1915 as a visiting scholar at Harvard University lecturing on Japanese literature and life. The lecture notes from this period were revised and were later the base for the book "History of Japanese Religion". He was also instrumental in founding the scholarly collection that became the library of the University of Tokyo.

A devout Nichiren Buddhist, he also published such titles as "How Christianity Appeals to a Japanese Buddhist" (Hibbert Journal, 1905). He translated Schopenhauer's "Die Welt als Wille und Vorstellung" into Japanese and explored terms of understanding between Buddhism and Western Philosophy.

== Honor ==
- Order of the Sacred Treasure, 3rd Class (1918)
- Legion of Honour (1928)

== Selected works ==
- Nichiren: The Buddhist Prophet, 1916.
- Hanatsumi Nikki, 1909 (recently translated as Flowers of Italy, 2009).
- Quelques pages d'histoire religieuse du Japon, 1921.
- A Concordance to the History of Kirishitan Missions, 1930.
- History of Japanese Religion. With Special Reference to the Social and Moral Life of the Nation, 1930.
- Art, Life and Nature in Japan, 1933.
- Religious Life of the Japanese People. Its Present Status and Historical Background, 1938.
- Waga Shogai (My Life), 1951.

== Sources ==
- Kitagawa, Joseph (1964). "Review of History of Japanese Religion by Masaharu Anesaki". The Journal of Religion. 44 (3): 273–274. doi:10.1086/485717. JSTOR 1200842.
- Ishibashi, Tomonobu (1943), Masaharu Anesaki. Ein kurzes Lebensbild, Monumenta Nipponica 6 (1/2), i–x, JSTOR 2382847.
- Isomae, Jun'ichi; Jacobowitz, Seth (2002), The Discursive Position of Religious Studies in Japan: Masaharu Anesaki and the Origins of Religious Studies. Method and Theory in the Study of Religion 14 (1), 21–46.
- Bloom, Alfred (May 1964). "Review: History of Japanese Religion; with Special Reference to the Social and Moral Life of the Nation". The Journal of Asian Studies. 23 (3): 476. doi:10.2307/2050784. JSTOR 2050784. S2CID 146818348.
