= Lafcadio Hearn Memorial Museum =

- 小泉八雲記念館
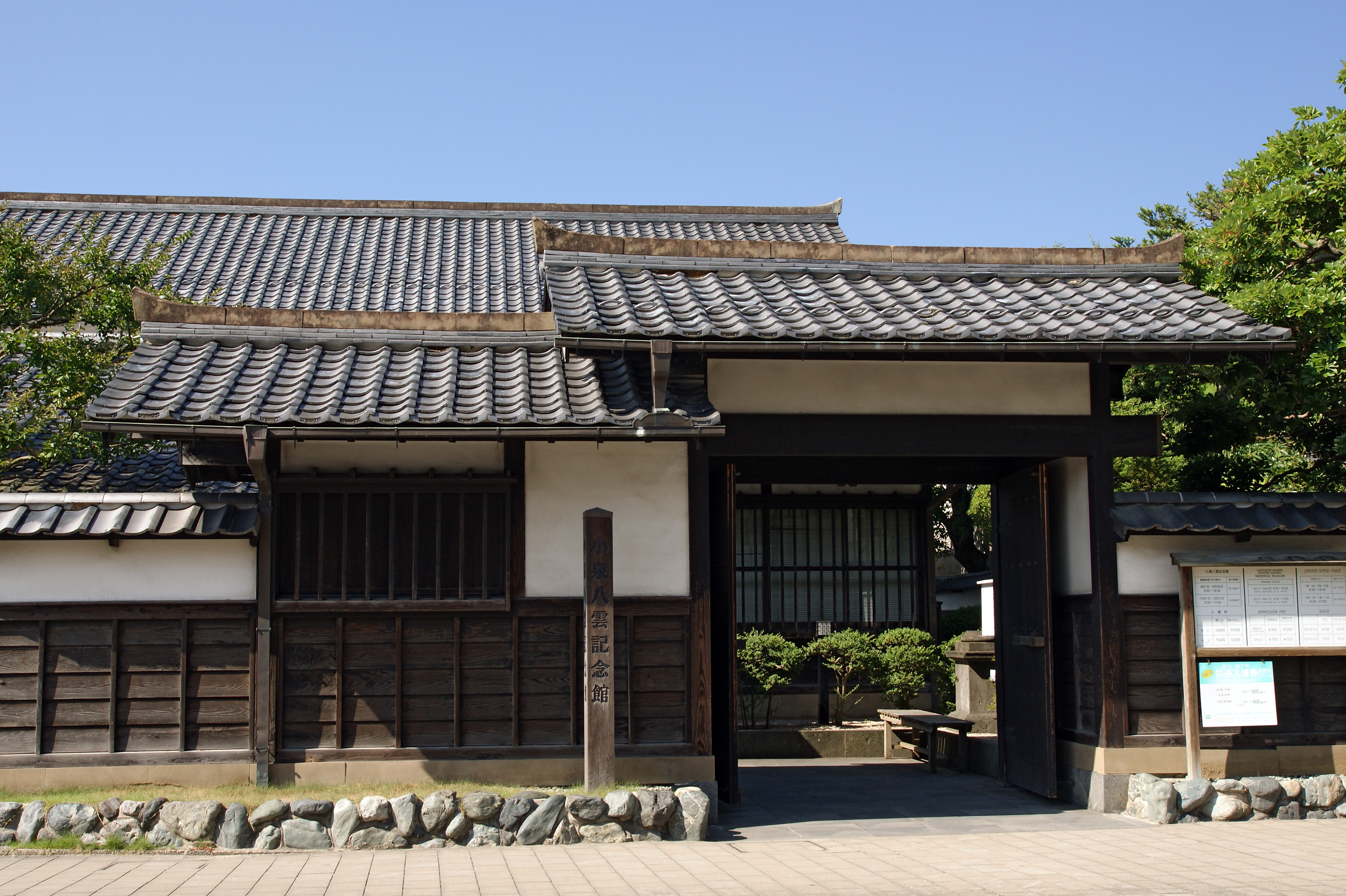
- Lafcadio Hearn Memorial Museum

- Lafcadio Hearn Memorial Museum Lafcadio Hearn Memorial Museum (Japan)
- Established: 21 November 1933
- Location: 322 Okuyacho, Matsue-shi, Shiman-ken Japan
- Coordinates: 35°28′45″N 133°02′57″E
- Type: Writer's house museum
- Website: Official website

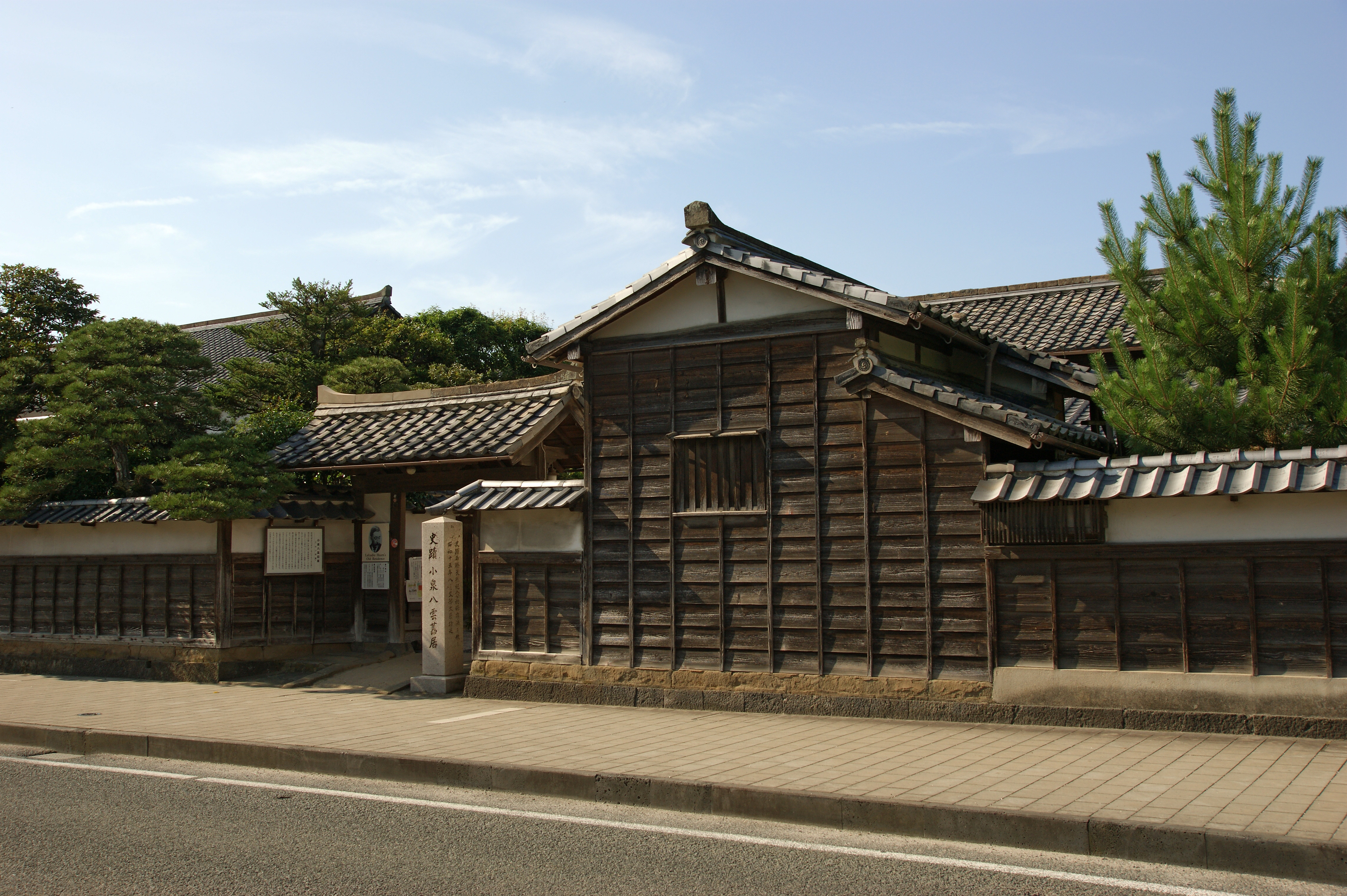
Lafcadio Hearn's former residence

The Lafcadio Hearn Memorial Museum (小泉八雲記念館, Koizumi Yakumo Kinenkan) is a literary museum located in Matsue, Shimane Prefecture, Japan. Established in 1933, it is dedicated to the life and work of the Greek–Irish writer and translator Lafcadio Hearn, also known by the name Yakumo Koizumi.

The original museum design was inspired by the Goethe-Nationalmuseum in Weimar, Germany, and its initial collection included 22 manuscripts donated by the Koizumi family through the efforts of Hearn's disciples, Teizaburo Ochiai and Seiichi Kishi. An additional 350 books were donated by the commemorative society. The current facility was renovated into a more traditional Japanese architectural style of houses, approximately 1,500 items. These include Hearn's personal belongings, his writings, related materials, and items left behind by his wife Setsu.

Since 2016, Hearn's great-grandson, Bon Koizumi, has been the museum's director. The museum attracts approximately 150,000 visitors annually.

== Lafcadio Hearn former residence ==
The museum is adjacent to the house in Kitahori-cho, Matsue where Hearn lived as newlyweds with his wife, Setsu, from May 1891 until he was transferred to Kumamoto's Daigo Junior High School in November of the same year. The location is in a corner of Shiomi Nawate, where samurai residences line the moat of Matsue Castle and the atmosphere of the old castle town remains. It is a one-story house with a tiled roof, approximately 15.5 meters in width and 10 meters in depth, and was built during the Kyōhō era (1716–1735) as a residence for a samurai family with a stipend of less than 500 koku. The owner, Negishi Tate, was the district officer of Hikawa District, Shimane, and Hearn was renting this house while he was away. He mainly used the three rooms on the left side, which overlooked the garden on three sides. Despite the relatively short stay in this residence, he was deeply nostalgic for this house, and wrote about it is several of his works, notably in Glimpses of Unfamiliar Japan. The house was designated a National Historic Site in 1940.

== See also ==
- List of Historic Sites of Japan (Shimane)
