= Setsuko Koizumi =

Japanese writer (1868–1932)

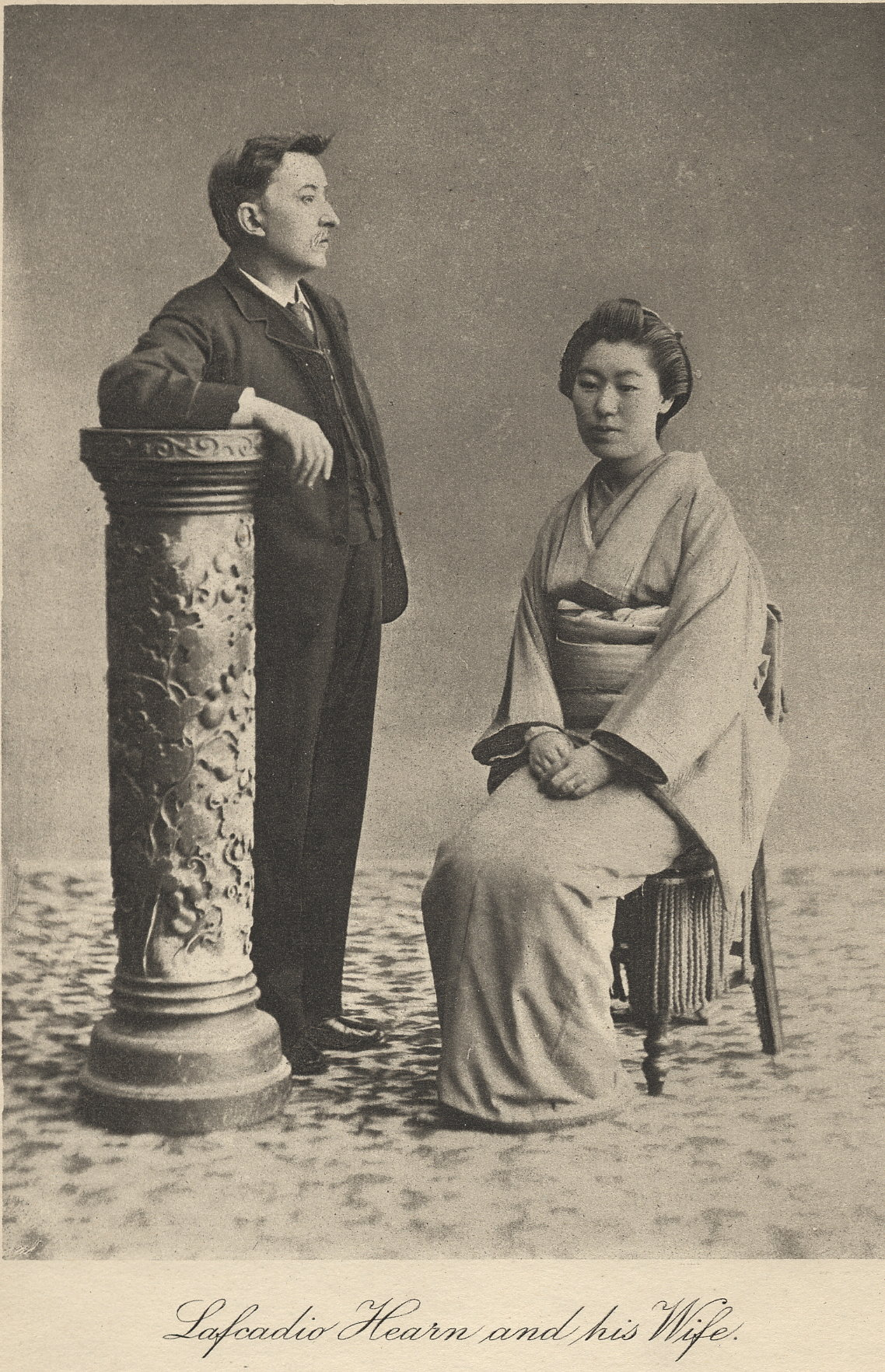
Lafcadio Hearn (left) and Setsuko (right)

Setsuko Koizumi (Japanese: 小泉 節子, 26 February 1868 - 18 February 1932), also known as Setsu Koizumi (小泉 セツ) was married to the writer Lafcadio Hearn (Koizumi Yakumo). She helped Hearn in writing, and is author of Reminiscences of Lafcadio Hearn (思い出の記). Her registered given name in the koseki was "Setsu", but she preferred "Setsuko".

Born as a daughter of the Koizumi family, whose members had served the Matsue Domain feudal clan in Izumo, at the age of 22 she married Hearn, who lived in Matsue as an English teacher. Since she liked stories from childhood, she helped her husband to understand Japanese folk tales and supported his writing about Japan.

== Early life ==
Setsu Koizumi was born on 4 February 1868. Her father was Koizumi Yaemon Minato, bangashira of the domain of Matsue feudal clan in Izumo whose karoku (hereditary stipend) was 400 koku, and her mother was Chie. Soon after she was born, she was adopted by the Inagaki family.

She liked stories from childhood, and often listened to fairy tales, folk tales, and local legends. After the Meiji Restoration, shizoku families lost stipends and were impoverished, and the Inagaki family was no exception: Setsuko graduated from primary school with excellent academic records and hoped to enter further education, but she had to work as a weaver at the age of 11.

When Setsuko was 18, the Inagaki family adopted a son of a shizoku family Maeda Tameji as their mukoyōshi (adopted son-in-law) and Setsuko's husband, but he left the family within a year since he could not bear the poverty. In 1890, Setsuko officially got divorced and returned to the Koizumi family.

== Marriage to Lafcadio Hearn ==
The date of the marriage of Setsuko and Lafcadio Hearn is uncertain. According to Setsuko herself, she married Hearn around December 1890. Another story says that since the Koizumi family was also impoverished, around February 1891 Setsuko started her work as a live-in housekeeper in Hearn's house, where he lived by himself as an English teacher. Nishida Sentaro, Hearn's colleague and English teacher, volunteered as an interpreter between Setsuko and Hearn, who was known as "Herun-san" by local people in Matsue. On 11 August 1891, Hearn sent a letter to a friend to announce his marriage with Setsuko. Interracial marriage was frowned upon in Japan at the time when Hearn and Setsuko married.

In November 1891, Hearn moved to Kumamoto with Setsuko. Setsuko unsuccessfully studied English to talk to Hearn. Setsuko, however, correctly understood Hearn's broken Japanese, called "Herun-san Kotoba" (Hearn-speak) in their family, and the couple communicated with each other. In 1893, their first son Kazuo was born.

In 1894, the couple moved to Kobe, Hyōgo Prefecture. He became a full-time writer after Glimpses of Unfamiliar Japan, a book which he wrote during his stay in Kumamoto, gained popularity. After that, Setsuko provided much of the material for Hearn's major works. In 1896, during their stay in Kobe, his application for naturalisation was granted by the governor of Shimane Prefecture and he became a member of the Koizumi family, officially changing his name to Koizumi Yakumo.

In 1896, the couple moved to Ichigaya, Ushigome-ku, Tokyo. Setsuko not only told Japanese folk legends but also explained what she read in published books to Hearn to help him in writing. Hearn asked Setsuko to be a "storyteller" who did not just read books aloud but told the stories in her own words, and Setsuko followed his requests. The couple had two sons and one daughter in Tokyo, but after they moved to Nishiokubo in 1902, Hearn's health began to deteriorate, and he died on 26 September 1904.

== Later years ==
Lafcadio Hearn left all his assets to his wife in his will. Living in their house with a study in Nishiokubo as they were when Hearn was alive, Setsuko raised her children in affluence. In 1914, Reminiscences of Lafcadio Hearn, her memoir about Hearn, was included in Koizumi Yakumo, edited by Tanabe Ryuji. She suffered from atherosclerosis in her last years, and died on 18 February 1932 at the age of 64. Her grave is at the Zōshigaya Cemetery.

== Appreciation and legacy ==
Since Setsuko was a major source of Japanese ghost stories for her husband, she is appreciated as "one of Hearn’s main partners in this highly discursive and collaborative culture of translation." Setsuko "provided him with new folk narratives to ponder, and he turned from his Creole work to focus on Japanese".

== See also ==
- The Ghost Writer's Wife (2025 television series). The protagonist Matsuno Toki is modeled after Koizumi.

== Bibliography ==
- 小泉節子小泉一雄 [Setsuko Koizumi, Kazuo Koizumi] (1967). "祖母のこと、父のこと". 全訳小泉八雲全集 [Complete translation of the complete works of Lafcadio Hearn] (in Japanese). Vol. 12. 恒文社. pp. 567–580.
- 高瀬彰典 [Akinori Takase] (2019). "小泉セツ". 国際社会で活躍した日本人 [Japanese people who have been active in the international community]. 弘文堂. pp. 81–100.
- 長谷川洋二 (2014). 八雲の妻 小泉セツの生涯. 今井書店. (Hasegawa, Yōji; Koizumi, Setsu; Hearn, Lafcadio (1997). A walk in Kumamoto: the life & times of Setsu Koizumi, Lafcadio Hearn's Japanese wife; including a new translation of her memoir "Reminiscences" (1. published ed.). Folkestone: Global Oriental. ISBN 978-1-86034-029-1.)
- 中井孝子 [Takako Nakai] (February 2017). "ハーンの妻セツの役割の再検討 －小泉一雄、雨森信成、三成重敬の証言を中心に－" [Reexamining the role of Hearn's wife, Setsu: Focusing on the testimonies of Koizumi Kazuo, Amemori Nobunari, and Mitsunari Shigetaka]. 多元文化 (in Japanese) (17). 名古屋大学国際言語文化研究科国際多元文化専攻: 61–75.
