= Henry Watkin =

American-English printer and activist (1824–1910)

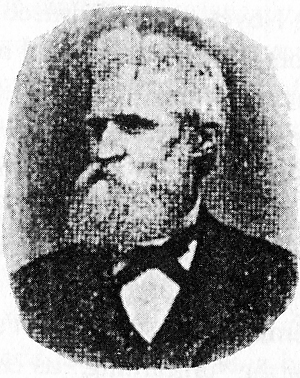
Henry Watkin (1824-1910) cooperative socialist, English printer in Cincinnati

Henry Watkin (March 6, 1824 – November 21, 1910), was an expatriate English printer and cooperative socialist in Cincinnati, Ohio during the mid-to-late 19th century.

While a young printer in London, Watkin became interested in the utopian socialist writings of Robert Owen, Charles Fourier, and Comte de Saint-Simon. Although it is still unknown to what degree Watkin participated in any cooperative or communalist movements in England or America before the Civil War, evidence suggests that Watkin was an active member of a community of progressive and radical Cincinnatians during his professional life. In 1870, he helped to found the "Cooperative Land and Building Association No.1 of Hamilton County, Ohio". The housing cooperative was organized in 1871 to build and develop a railroad suburb named Bond Hill just a few miles outside of the corporate limits of Cincinnati. Besides his work founding Bond Hill, Watkin is best known as the friend and fatherly mentor of the 19th century Japanophile writer Lafcadio Hearn.

== Early life and education ==
Henry Watkin was born in Pitsford, Northamptonshire, a village near Northampton in central England, to Baptist parents, William Watkin and Mary Hobson Watkin. The Watkin family was large and after his father's death at the age of six, Henry, his four older and two younger siblings were raised by their mother with income from the Watkin family's rental properties. As children, both he and a sister, Hephzibah, suffered grievous eye injuries, a circumstance which may have figured significantly later in his life.

Watkin apprenticed as a printer under his uncle John Gardiner Fuller, an abolitionist and son of Andrew Fuller (co-founder of the Baptist Missionary Society), in Bristol. Family letters indicate that in 1845 after staying for a period with another uncle, Reverend Andrew Gunton Fuller, in London, he traveled to America. By 1847 Watkin had made his way to Cincinnati where he worked for the Cincinnati newspaper, the Daily Gazette, a known organ for the land reform movement at the time. Within a few years, Watkin became foreman of the Gazette but left in 1853 to set up his own bookstore and printing shop.

On May 26 of that same year, Henry Watkin married Laura Ann Fry (1831-1914), a dressmaker and woodcarver from a family of prominent artist craftsmen and Swedenborgians hailing from Bath, England (Howe 2003). (Laura emigrated to America with her father, Henry Fry, in 1851). Henry Fry was a vocal and religiously inspired supporter of communism in England. While the Fry family was less vocal about their radicalism in America, their strong affiliation with the Cincinnati Swedenborgian community, and friendships with wealthy progressives and artists suggests that the Frys and Henry Watkin were well within the milieu of radical Cincinnati.

According to the 1860 census of Millcreek Township in Hamilton County, Ohio, Laura and Henry were living in the Bond Hill area, the site on which, ten years later, Watkin's cooperative would situate their new community. In 1857, Henry and Laura had a daughter, Effie Maud Watkin (1857-1944).

From descriptions of Henry Watkin in biographies of Lafcadio Hearn, Watkin is described as a “largely self-taught, freethinking radical... especially interested in utopian communalism” (Jonathan Cott 1991, 34). Writing soon after his death another biographer wrote:

Henry Watkin was a person of apparently elastic views and varied reading; self educated but shrewd and gifted with a natural knowledge of mankind. He was nearly thirty years older than the boy he spoke to, but he remembered the days when his ideal of life had been far other than working a printing-press in a back street in Cincinnati. At one time he had steeped himself in the French school of philosophy, Fourierism and Saint-Simonism; then for a time followed Hegel and Kant, regaling himself in lighter moments with Edgar Allan Poe and Hoffman’s weird tales. (Nina Kennard 1912, 66)

== Publications ==
The list of publications from Watkin's printing shop underlies Watkin's political and social sympathies. The first known book he published was an 1854 spiritualist work by Through H. Tuttle, An outline of universal government, : being a general exposition of the plan of the universe, by a society of the sixth circle. To which is added a lecture purporting to emanate from the spirit of Benjamin Franklin, on the philosophy of spiritual intercourse, and the reasons why spirits disagree in their communications. Watkin also published a large number of songsheets of African-American spirituals and hymns, as well as sermons from the African Methodist Episcopal Church, other spiritualist writings, and miscellaneous printings for Cincinnati merchants and commercial enterprises.

Watkin's printings for spiritualists and the African-American community paralleled the interests of his contemporary Fourierists, and likely indicate that Watkin was more than simply a reader of Charles Fourier. Fourierist communities in America waned in the late 1840s while many Fourierists were drawn to the spiritualist and anti-slavery abolitionist movements building throughout the 1850s. This is especially true of Cincinnati, where remnants of the Clermont Phalanx helped to populate the city's Spiritual Brotherhood, a spiritualist society.

== Friendship with Lafcadio Hearn ==
One of Henry Watkin's close friends was the Japanophile writer Lafcadio Hearn, who became famous in the late 19th century for his descriptions of Japanese culture and sensibility. The young Hearn arrived nearly penniless in Cincinnati in 1869 and barely survived by working odd jobs, sleeping in haylofts, and cutting his hunger pangs with opium. Later that year, after collapsing from exhaustion, he was dragged into Watkin's shop, where he finally got help. In the Reminiscences of Watkin's niece Hepsie Watkin Churchill, she speculates that Watkin's sympathy for the lad was in part motivated by Hearn's ruined eye, a handicap that Watkin shared. Watkin gave Hearn shelter in a back room of his printing shop, fed him, and quickly became his friend, mentor, and surrogate father. Confident of Hearn's heretofore-unrecognized abilities, "Mr. Watkin secured for the boy a position with a Captain Barney, who edited and published a commercial paper, for which Hearn solicited advertisements and to which he began also to contribute articles" (Bronner 1908, 25). In the print shop, and on lengthy walks through Cincinnati, Watkin and Hearn discussed the utopias of Robert Owen, the Comte de Saint-Simon, and Charles Fourier, the fantasies of Edgar Allan Poe, and all the morbid and sensational events that found their place in Hearn’s articles for The Cincinnati Enquirer and the Cincinnati Commercial Tribune. Their mutual curiosities into spiritualist practice lead them to attend séances in Covington. In part through Watkin's support and friendship, Hearn became a prolific and well-known journalist and writer.

== Involvement with cooperatives ==
After the Civil War, records indicate that Watkin was active in Cincinnati's socialist scene. In 1868, he was one of the initial stockholders subscribed in the Mutual Benefit Grocery, a cooperative grocery store in downtown Cincinnati. The grocery was a hub in the network of Cincinnati progressives including members from other prominent socialist families, the Hallers and McLeans, as well as other forward-thinking printers, Caleb Clark and Charles Adams, also active in Cincinnati socialist movements. Watkin's social network also included members and administrators of the Young Men’s Mercantile Library.

These connections helped Watkin connect with the social philanthropists eager to create new affordable housing outside of Cincinnati, which in 1869 was even more densely populated than London. In 1870, Watkin helped to form the "Cooperative Land and Building Association No.1 of Hamilton County, Ohio" and in 1871 set about constructing the new suburb in the countryside nearby where he lived. William S. Munson, railroad broker, scion of a wealthy iron merchant family, and president of the Young Men's Mercantile Library (1873–74) was an early investor in the cooperative and became the Co-op's treasurer. It is likely that the cooperative elements of the Bond Hill's building association were inspired through Watkin's lifelong interest in cooperationism. Due to the financial hardships brought upon by the Long Depression of the 1870s, Watkin likely suffered greatly. By 1880, both his wife and daughter were recorded as in the census as living away from Cincinnati, in Kansas City, Missouri. (Laura Ann and Effie were likely either teaching or engaged in woodcarving furniture or interiors there).

Other stresses besides the depression seem to also have affected Watkin's project. In the early 1880s a schism appears to have split the cooperative, and Watkin's activities in its leadership seem to decrease thereafterwards. Records of the Bond Hill Civic Association reveal that Watkin was printing membership cards for the organization as late as September 29, 1893, although by then Watkin and his family had moved next door to his father-in-law, Henry Fry's Sunflower Cottage, in Pleasant Ridge.

== Later years ==
In 1895, according to correspondence, an accident befell the 71-year-old Watkin. He continued working with the help of his assistant printer, Frank H. Vehr. By 1902 Watkin — by then the oldest practicing printer in Cincinnati — had retired from printing and sold his shop to Vehr. While continuing to work, first selling novelties and afterwards doing unknown work in an office building, Henry (with his wife and daughter) moved into Cincinnati’s Old Men’s and Widow's Home, a nursing home in Walnut Hills.

According to his obituary, Watkin died of exhaustion at 4 o'clock in the morning, Monday, November 21, 1910, at the age of 86. In 1914, Laura died as well. Their bodies were cremated. After her mother's death, Effie Watkin, spent a few years outside the home but never married. Returning to the home she spent the rest of her life there until her death in 1944. Henry Watkin is survived by the descendants of his other siblings: John (1817-1904), William (1819-?), James (1822-?), Mary (1820-?), Hephzibah (1827-?) and Sarah Ann Watkin (1829-?).
