= Kei Okami =

Japanese physician (1859–1941)

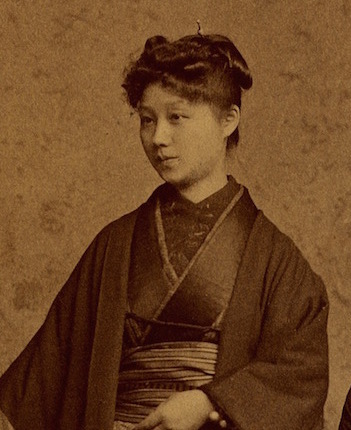
- Born: 11 September 1859; Aomori Prefecture, Japan
- Died: 2 September 1941 (aged 82)
- Other names: Nishida Keiko, Keiko Okami, Kei Nishida Okami, Kyōko Okami
- Education: Women's Medical College of Pennsylvania, 1889.
- Occupation: Physician
- Known for: The first Japanese woman to obtain a degree in Western medicine from a Western university

Kei Okami (岡見 京, Okami Kei; 11 September 1859 – 2 September 1941) was a Japanese physician. She was the first Japanese woman to obtain a degree in Western medicine from a Western university (Women's Medical College of Pennsylvania, USA).

== Early life ==
Kei Okami was born as Nishida Keiko in Aomori Prefecture in 1859. She graduated from the Yokohama Kyoritsu Girls' School in 1878 and then taught English at the Sakurai Girls' School. During the Meiji period, educational opportunities for women were expanding but access to higher education and professional careers remained limited, particularly in fields such as medicine. Women's education in Japan developed through a combination of government initiatives, private institutions, and missionary actives which led to establishing schools for girls.

She married an art teacher, Okami Senkichiro, at the age of 25. The couple subsequently traveled to the United States. This move was part of a pattern of Japanese engagement with Western education during the Meiji era when individuals increasingly studied abroad to gain access to professional training that was unavailable in Japan at the time.

== Medical training ==
In America, Kei Okami studied at the Woman's Medical College of Pennsylvania, receiving aid from the Women's Foreign Missionary Society of the Presbyterian Church. At the time, the college was one of the few institutions in the United States offering formal medical education to women and also trained international students who were often excluded from medical education in their home countries.

After four years of study, she graduated in 1889, with Susan La Flesche Picotte, following in the footsteps of Anandi Gopal Joshi who graduated in 1886. Okami thus became the first Japanese woman to obtain a degree in the Western medicine from a Western university. Her education formed a part of broader international movement of women from Asia and other regions who travelled abroad in the nineteenth century to pursue medical training that was unavailable to them domestically.

According to the author Bharadwaj et al women such as Anandi Gopal Joshi pursued medical education abroad under similar conditions, reflecting a wider international movement of women entering Western medical institutions during this period.

== Medical career ==
After returning to Japan, Kei Okami worked at Jikei Hospital (now the Jikei University School of Medicine hospital) at the invitation of Takaki Kanehiro. Some accounts report that she resigned after encountering gender-based restrictions in patient access, including the refusal of high-profile patients to be treated by a female physician. She subsequently opened her own clinic, operating out of her home in Akasaka Tameike, Minato. Okami worked primarily in gynecology and also treated patient with tuberculosis, reflecting common public health concerns of the period in Japan. Okami is reported to have established a small tuberculosis care facility, sometimes referred to Eisei-En sanitarium.

Later, she closed her private practice and served as the vice-principal of Shoei Girls' school (a predecessor of the Shoei Girls' Junior and Senior High School) which was founded by her brother-in-law Kiyomune where she taught anatomy to nurses in a major hospital. In 1897, she opened a small hospital for women in partnership with a friend, Mrs. True, and also established a school of nursing in the same location. The hospital closed after approximately nine years, due to a limited number of patients, which largely consisted of foreign female missionaries.

Okami later retired due to breast cancer. A devout Christian, she participated in missionary work in Japan and taught anatomy to nurses in one of Japan's major hospitals.

== See also ==
- Kusumoto Ine, first Japanese woman trained in Western medicine, at a Japanese school
- Ogino Ginko, who graduated from the Juntendo University in 1882.
