= Tsunashima Ryōsen =

- 綱島 梁川
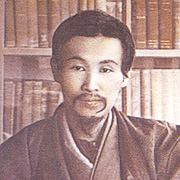
- Born: May 27, 1873
- Died: September 14, 1907 (aged 34)
- Resting place: Zōshigaya Cemetery, Tokyo
- Education: Tōkyō Senmon Gakkō
- Occupations: Author, philosopher

Tsunashima Ryōsen (綱島 梁川, Tsunashima Ryōsen; May 27, 1873–September 14, 1907) was a Japanese author and philosopher. He was a graduate of Tōkyō Senmon Gakkō. He was originally a rationalist and then became a Christian. He is buried in Tokyo's Zōshigaya cemetery.
