= Ogino Ginko =

Japanese physician

Ginko Ogino
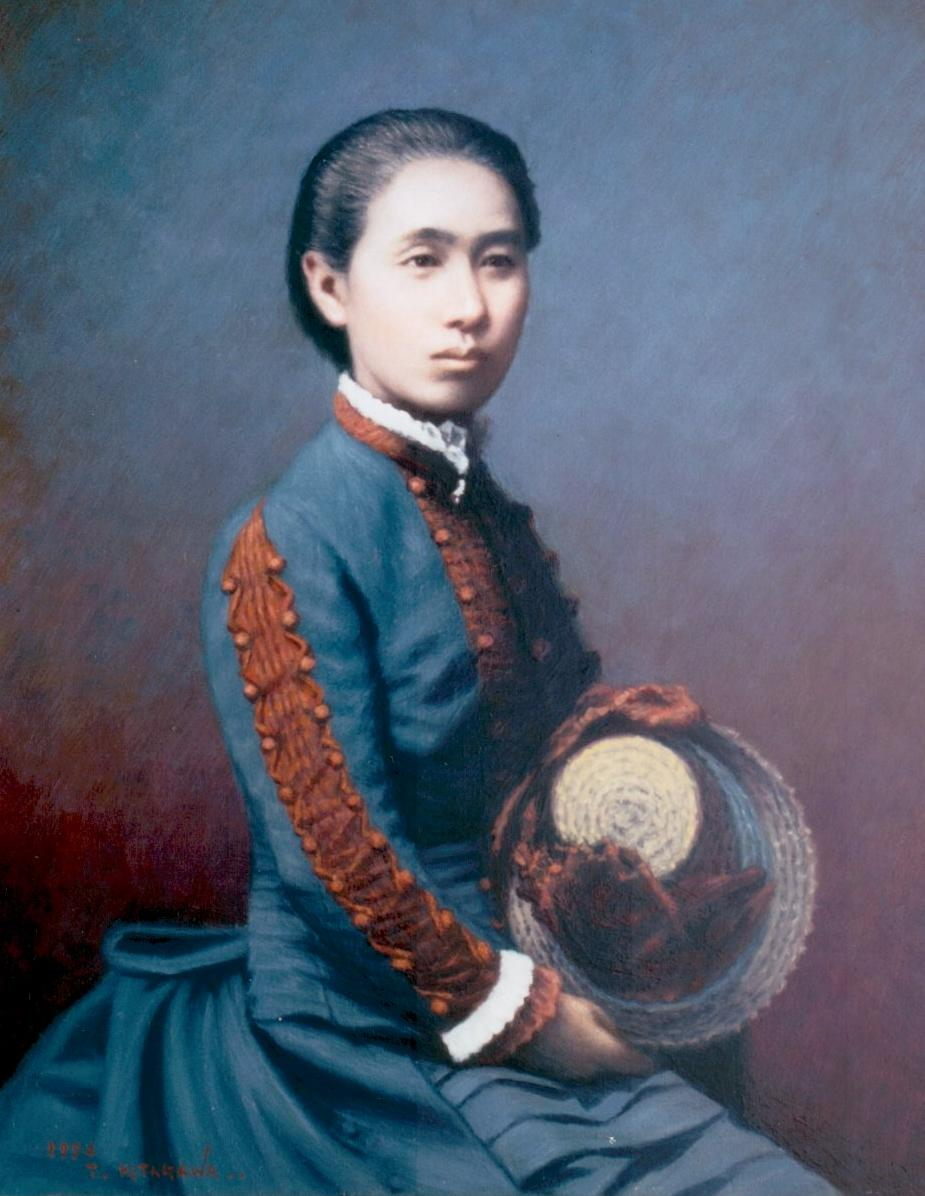
- Born: Gin Ogino; April 4, 1851; Kumagaya, Saitama, Japan
- Died: June 23, 1913 (aged 62); Tokyo, Japan
- Occupation: Physician

Ogino Ginko (荻野 吟子; April 4, 1851 – June 23, 1913) was the first licensed female physician practicing Western medicine in Japan.

== Birth and upbringing ==
Ogino Ginko was born with the name Ogino Gin in Tawarase, in Musashi Province (present-day Kumagaya City, Saitama Prefecture). She was the youngest of seven children born to her father Ayasaburo Ogino and mother Kayo Ogino. The Oginos were reportedly a respectable family as they were responsible for the headquarter of that area.

== First marriage ==
In 1867 when she was 16 years old, Ogino Gin married Kanichiro Inamura in an arranged marriage. Kanichiro Inamura was the eldest son of a well-respected and wealthy family. However, he had contracted gonorrhoea prior to this marriage and soon passed it on to Ogino Gin. After falling ill and becoming infertile as a result of this disease, she left her new husband and returned to live with her parents. Both families agreed to a divorce in 1870, publicly stating Ogino Gin's infertility as the reason for the split in order to preserve each family's reputation. Regardless, Ogino Gin's family was reportedly deeply ashamed of her, as Japanese society considered divorced women to be extremely dishonorable. To make matters worse, she was now burdened by the social stigma attached to a sexually transmitted disease commonly associated with prostitution.

== Journey to becoming a physician ==
=== Inspiration ===
Ogino Gin's gonorrhoea now needed medical attention. In the beginning of her treatment, she was helped by Doctor Mannen Matsumoto, a specialist and professor in Chinese medicine. Dr. Matsumoto attempted to assist Ogino Gin in the initial phase of her recovery with herbal remedies. During her treatment, she became acquainted with Dr. Matsumoto's daughter, who was also interested in the role and impact that women played in Japanese society of that time. Later, Ogino Gin became her mentor.

After the initial treatments with traditional Chinese medicine did not work, Ogino Gin found help from doctor Shochu Sato, who instead treated her with Western medicine in Tokyo's Juntendo Hospital. Ogino Gin was inspired by these different treatments and became increasingly interested in Western medicine as it was based on observation and pragmatism, which was an extreme deviation from Chinese medicine. For example, human dissections were (and still are) often used as teaching tools in Western medicine. These dissections provided students and practitioners with a much more precise investigation into the human body. This practice was not used in the more traditional Oriental medicine.

During this time, Ogino Gin often felt ashamed of her disease, and being seen by male doctors only aggravated this feeling. It was after this experience she decided to become a doctor to help women in similar situations and to raise awareness for women's health issues. Upon further reflection she realized that often, male doctors' prejudice toward female patients and their lack of female anatomical knowledge led to mistakes in the evaluation of disease, especially when it came to gynecological issues. In her writings, she fiercely advocated for the need for more female physicians in Japan. She cited the fact that women often felt too uncomfortable with male doctors examining their private parts; therefore, having a female doctor would encourage women to get their ailments treated while also protecting their modesty. She also wrote that only a woman, who had the most innate and intimate knowledge of the female body, could properly diagnose, operate on, and treat matters of women's health.

At this time, women had just started to stand up for their right to education. During the Meiji period, many people still believed that the female mind was weaker than the male one, and that applying the same standards to male and female higher education could be deleterious. Prior to the Meiji period, women were often considered incompetent in the raising of children. During the Meiji period, motherhood was shifted to be the central task of a woman and the vast majority of people did not approve of their education. However, many male intellectuals still supported the struggle for women's independence.

=== 1873–1874 ===
In 1873, Ogino Gin moved to Tokyo to study under Japanese scholar of National Learning Yorikuni Inoue. However, she soon briefly moved to the city of Kofu in 1874 to work as a teacher at the Naito Women’s School because her relationship with professor Inoue quickly deteriorated upon Ogino Gin refusing his marriage proposal. She taught the subjects of Chinese Classics and History there.

=== 1875–1879 ===
In 1875, Ogino Gin enrolled in Tokyo Women's Normal School (present-day Ochanomizu University). It was here that she won the support of one of her teachers, who, knowing that she wanted to become a doctor, later helped her enroll in a private medical school. Around the time of her enrollment, Ogino Gin added an additional character to her name, changing it to Ogino Ginko. In early-modern Japan, name changing was a common practice used typically by men to signify a major life transition. This was her way of challenging traditional gender roles and rejecting the longstanding Japanese custom of giving women short names to make commanding them easier. She graduated from Tokyo Women's Normal School in 1879 with full honors. This achievement was unique because only 15 out of 74 female students from the Tokyo Women's Normal School managed to do so.

=== 1880–1885 ===
In 1880, Ogino Ginko enrolled in Kojuin Medical School, which was at that time a private medical academy with an all-male student body. Thus, she became the first female student at this institution. She would often dress as a boy while commuting to Kojuin Medical School in an attempt to conceal her gender and lessen the hostility she faced.

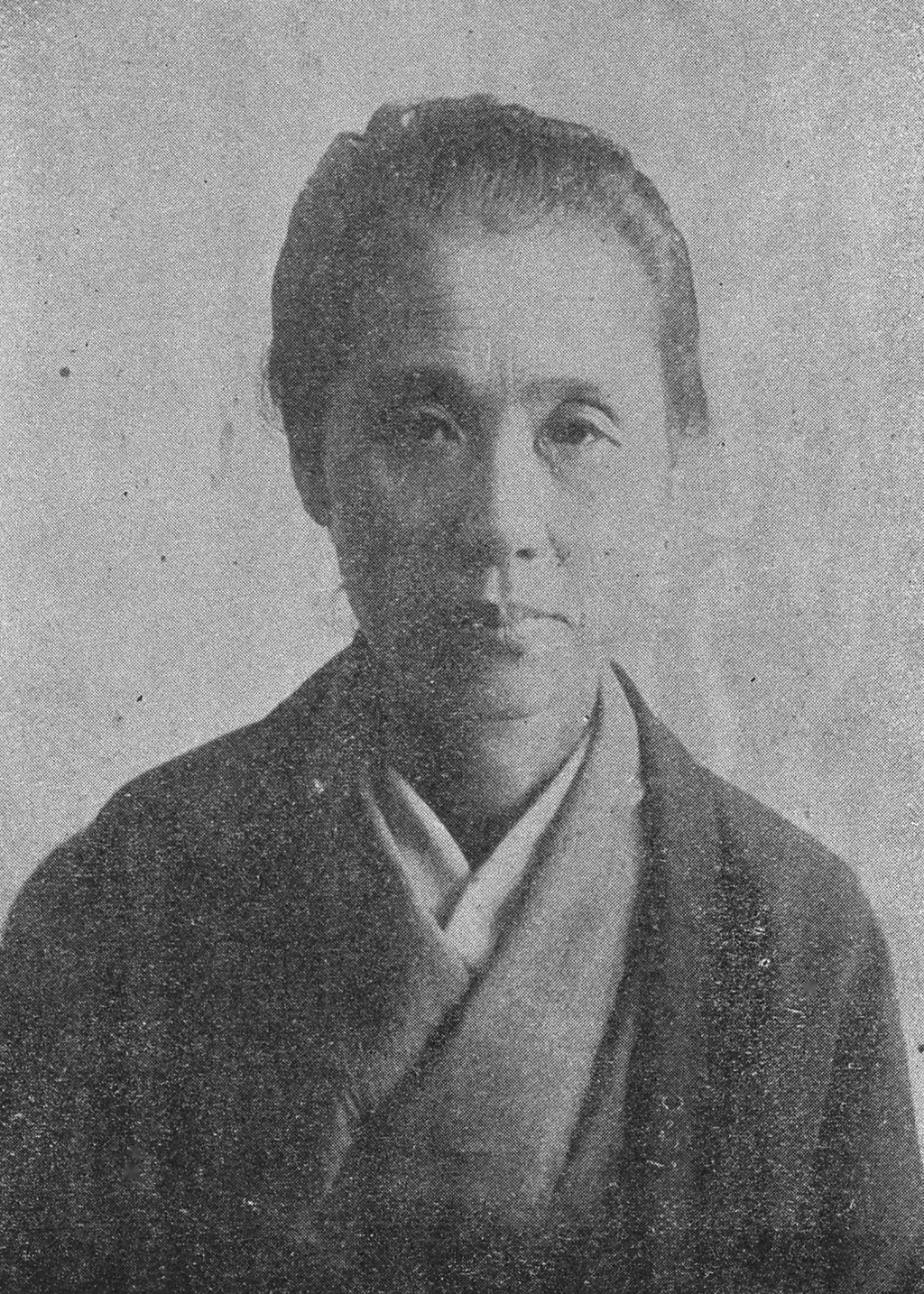
Portrait of Ogino Ginko

Despite the prejudice and hardship she faced while in medical school, she managed to graduate in 1882. Usually, upon the completion of medical school, students were permitted to sit for the official two-part medical licencing exam. Ogino Ginko was initially barred from taking this exam on account of her gender, despite her being equally qualified. Her applications to take this exam were rejected because there was no precedent for female doctors of Western medicine. It was only thanks to a series of petitions that she was finally allowed to take the medical practitioner's examination in 1885. Prominent figures who advocated for Ogino Ginko to take this exam include Takashima Kauemon, a respected businessman and entrepreneur, and Ishiguro Tadanori, a Japanese Imperial Army surgeon and later president of the Japanese Red Cross Society. She also benefited from the advocacy of other influential figures, such as Iwamoto Yoshiharu and Yorikuni Inoue, who were prominent supporters of female empowerment. Ogino Ginko was the first woman to be able to sit for this exam, and she eventually passed both parts of it. This officially made her the first woman in Japan licensed to practice Western medicine.

== After acquiring her license ==
=== 1885–1890 ===
Once she obtained her medical license, she opened the Ogino Hospital in Yushima later in 1885. It was there that she led a clinic specializing in obstetrics and gynecology. In the same year, she was baptized in the Christian Church.

Upon experiencing immense professional growth, Ogino Ginko moved to the district of Ueno, Tokyo, and opened another larger clinic. She was also named secretary of the Women's Sanitary Association and a teacher of Health and Physiology at the Meiji Women's School. Because she was working at a Christian university, Ogino Ginko's interest in the Christian Church continued to grow. She consequently reorganized her schedule to dedicate any spare time to the Christian Church and volunteer work.

While still in Tokyo and motivated by the growing interest of in medicine and women's health, Ogino Ginko not only founded, but also became an instructor in the Woman's Christian Temperance Union (WCTU) in 1889. Moreover, she was nominated secretary of another association working to ensure women's health.

=== 1890–1906 ===
In 1890, Ogino Ginko married a Protestant clergyman and utopian visionary named Yukiyoshi Shikata. Together, they adopted the child of Yukiyoshi Shikata's sister, who had passed away during a difficult birth in which Ogino Ginko was attending to as an obstetrician. After their marriage, Ogino Ginko, Yukiyoshi Shikata, and their new child moved to Hokkaido in 1894. The purpose of this move was to aid in Yukiyoshi Shikata's efforts to establish a Christian settler community in underdeveloped land.

After this community attempt failed, Ogino Ginko and her family moved to Setana, Hokkaido In 1897. It was here that she established a new Gynecology and Pediatrics clinic as well as founded the Society of Feminine Virtues. She instructed women in various skills, including first aid and physiology.

Upon the death of her second husband, Ogino Ginko returned to Tokyo in 1906. She worked at a clinic there until her death in 1913.

Ogino Ginko has become one of the most important feminist and scientific figures of the Meiji period. As she triumphed in these fields, other women soon began to follow suit, enriching the community of women pursuing medical careers. Ogino Ginko became a pioneer for women's rights to education participation in the medical profession. She vigorously asserted that women had valuable contributions to make to the field of medicine and that they were entitled to modesty and autonomy over their own bodies.

== Death ==
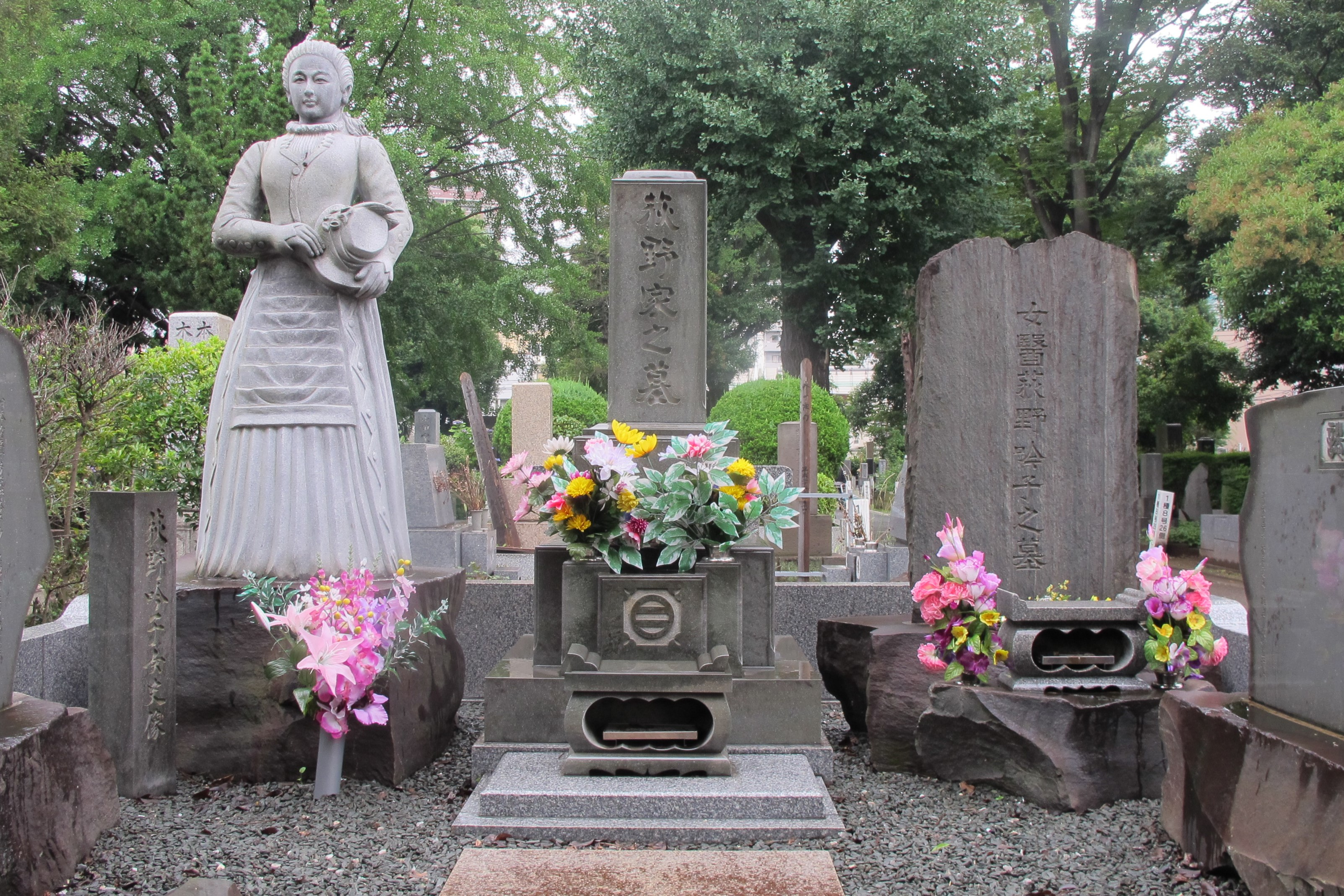
Ogino Ginko's grave at Zoshigaya Cemetery

Ogino Ginko died of atherosclerosis on June 23, 1913, in Tokyo, aged 62. Her body is buried at Zoshigaya Cemetery in Tokyo.

A large memorial tower was erected in Ogino Ginko's honor in the city of Setana, Hokkaido in 1967, honoring the many contributions she made to the community. The Setana Regional History Museum also displays various objects of hers in remembrance.

== See also ==
- Kei Okami, who graduated from the Woman's Medical College of Pennsylvania in 1889.
- Kusumoto Ine, first practising female doctor of Western medicine in Japan.
