= Lafcadio Hearn =

Writer and translator (1850–1904)

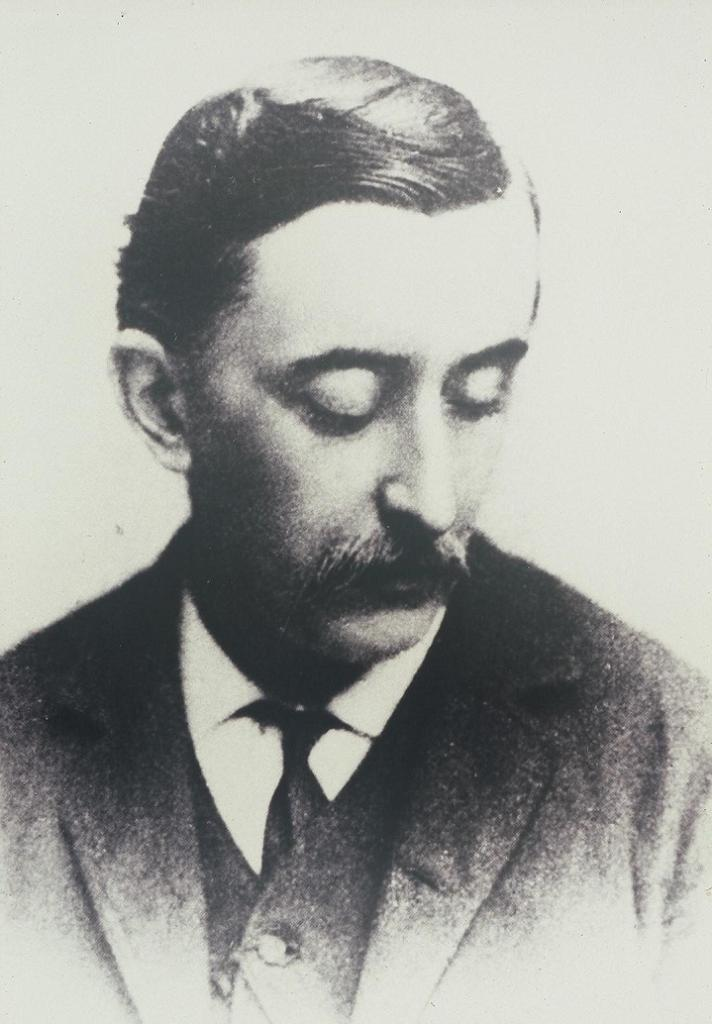
- Hearn in 1889
- Born: Patrick Lafcadio Hearn; 27 June 1850; Lefkada, Ionian Islands
- Died: 26 September 1904 (aged 54); Tokyo, Japan
- Resting place: Zōshigaya Cemetery
- Citizenship: Japan (from 1896)
- Spouses: Alethea Foley (m. 1874; div. 1877) Setsuko Koizumi (m. 1890)
- Children: 4
- Writing career
- Pen name: Yakumo Koizumi (小泉 八雲, Koizumi Yakumo)
- Language: English, Greek, Japanese, French

Japanese name
- Kanji: 小泉 八雲
- Hiragana: こいずみ やくも
- Katakana: コイズミ ヤクモ
Transcriptions
- Romanization: Koizumi Yakumo

Patrick Lafcadio Hearn (Note: Greek: Πατρίκιος Λευκάδιος Χερν, romanized: Patrícios Levcádios Chern) (27 June 1850 – 26 September 1904) was a Greek and Irish writer, translator, and teacher whose work played a significant role in the introduction of the culture and literature of Japan to the mainstream Western world.

His writings offered unprecedented insight into Japanese culture, especially his collections of legends and ghost stories, such as Kwaidan: Stories and Studies of Strange Things. Before moving to Japan and becoming a Japanese citizen, he worked as a journalist in the United States, primarily in Cincinnati and New Orleans. His writings about New Orleans, based on his decade-long stay there, are also well-known.

Hearn was born on the Greek island of Lefkada but moved to Dublin, where he was abandoned first by his mother, then his father, and finally by his father's aunt (who had been appointed his official guardian). At the age of 19, he immigrated to the United States, where he found work as a newspaper reporter, first in Cincinnati and later in New Orleans. From there, he was sent as a correspondent to Martinique in the French West Indies, where he stayed for two years, and then in 1890 to Japan, where he would remain for the rest of his life, assuming the name Yakumo Koizumi. (Note: Japanese: 小泉 八雲, romanized: Koizumi Yakumo)

In Japan, Hearn married Setsuko Koizumi, with whom he had four children. His writings about Japan offered the Western world an introduction to Japanese culture.

== Biography ==
=== Early life ===
Patrick Lafcadio Hearn was born on 27 June 1850 on Lefkada in the Ionian Islands, which were then a British protectorate. His father, Charles Bush Hearn, was an Anglo-Irish medical officer who had been sent to the islands with the army, while his mother was a Greek named Rosa Cassimati, a native of the island of Kythera.

Throughout his life, Lafcadio loved his mother, feeling that everything good in him came from her. He frequently boasted of his Greek blood and felt a passionate connection towards Greece, while, on the other hand, resenting his father and dropping the Irish name Patrick entirely, calling himself Lafcadio. He vehemently denied and despised the paternal part of his parentage, while reimagining himself and his ancestry as "completely Greek".

He was baptized Patrikios Lefcadios Hearn (Greek: Πατρίκιος Λευκάδιος Χερν) in the Greek Orthodox Church, but he seems to have been called "Patrick Lefcadio Kassimati Charles Hearn" in English; the middle name "Lafcadio" was given to him in honour of the island where he was born. Hearn's parents were married in a Greek Orthodox ceremony on 25 November 1849, several months after his mother had given birth to Hearn's older brother, George Robert Hearn, on 24 July 1849. George died on 17 August 1850, two months after Lafcadio's birth.

==== Emigration to Ireland and abandonment ====
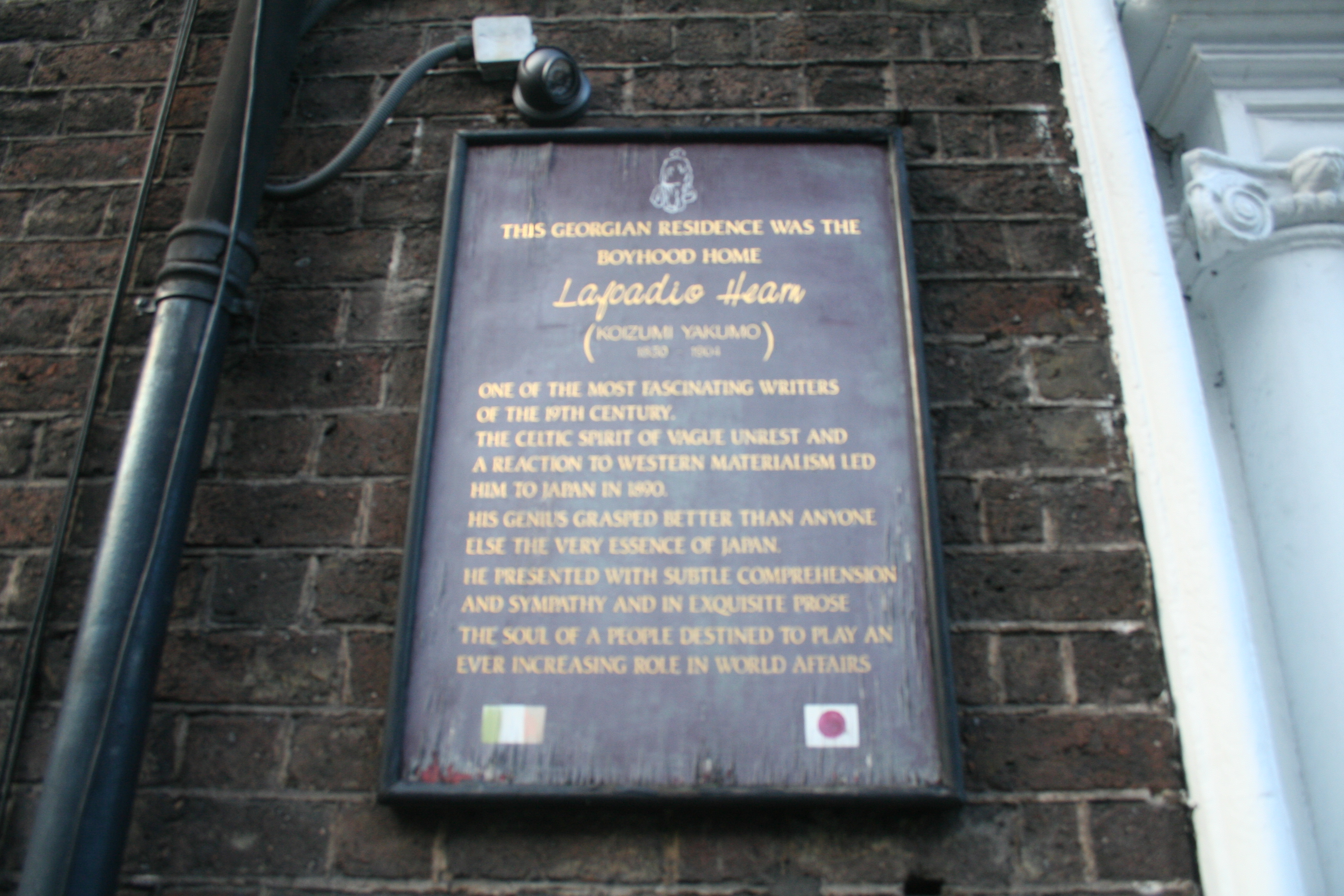
Plaque on Hearn's home on Gardiner Street, Dublin

In 1850, Hearn's father was reassigned from Lefkada to the British West Indies. Since his family did not approve of the marriage, and because he was worried that his relationship might harm his career prospects, Charles did not inform his superiors of his son or pregnant wife and left his family behind. In 1852, he arranged to send his son and wife to live with his family in Dublin, where they met with a cool reception. Charles's Protestant mother, Elizabeth Holmes Hearn, had difficulty accepting Rosa's Greek Orthodox faith and lack of education, as she was illiterate and spoke no English. Rosa herself found it difficult to adapt to a foreign culture and the Protestantism of her husband's family, and was eventually taken under the wing of Elizabeth's sister, Sarah Holmes Brenane, a widow who had converted to Catholicism.

Despite Sarah's efforts, Rosa suffered from homesickness. When her husband returned to Ireland on medical leave in 1853, it became clear that the couple had become estranged. Charles Hearn was assigned to the Crimean Peninsula, again leaving his pregnant wife and child in Ireland. When he came back in 1856, severely wounded and traumatized, Rosa had returned to her home island of Cerigo (Kythera), where she gave birth to their third son, Daniel James Hearn. Lafcadio had been left in the care of Sarah Brenane.

Charles petitioned to have the marriage with Rosa annulled, on the grounds that she had not signed their marriage contract, which made it invalid under English law. After being informed of the annulment, Rosa almost immediately married Giovanni Cavallini, a Greek citizen of Italian ancestry, who was later appointed by the British as governor of Cerigotto (Antikythera). Cavallini required as a condition of the marriage that Rosa give up custody of both sons. As a result, James was sent to his father in Dublin while Lafcadio remained in the care of his great-aunt, Sarah Brenane, who had disinherited Charles because of the annulment. Neither Lafcadio nor James ever again saw their mother, who had four children with her second husband. Rosa was eventually committed to the National Mental Asylum on Corfu, where she died in 1882.

Charles Hearn, who had left Lafcadio in the care of Sarah Brenane for the past four years, now appointed her as Lafcadio's permanent guardian. He married his childhood sweetheart, Alicia Goslin, in July 1857, and left with his new wife for a posting in Secunderabad, in the princely state of Hyderabad under the British Raj, where they had three daughters prior to Alicia's death in 1861. Lafcadio never saw his father again: Charles Hearn died of malaria in the Gulf of Suez in 1866.

In 1857, at age seven and despite the fact that both his parents were still alive, Hearn became the permanent ward of Sarah Brenane. She divided her residency between Dublin in the winter months, and her husband's estate at Tramore, County Waterford, on the southern Irish coast, and a house at Bangor in north Wales. Brenane engaged a tutor during the school year to provide Hearn with basic instruction and the rudiments of Catholic dogma. Hearn began exploring Brenane's library and read extensively in Greek literature, especially myths.

==== Catholic education and more abandonment ====
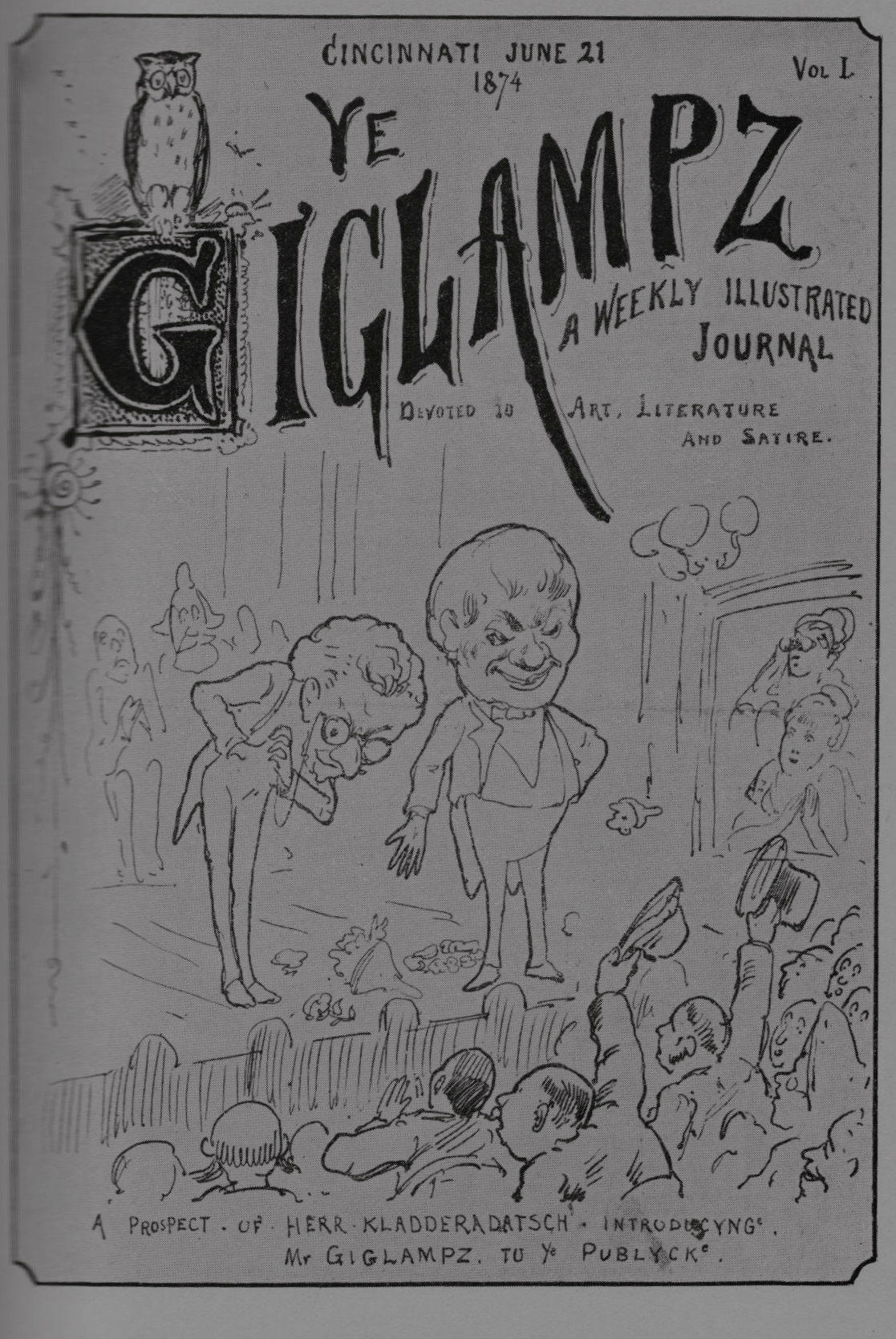
The first issue of Ye Giglampz, a satirical weekly published in 1874 by Hearn and Henry Farny

In 1861, his great-aunt was aware that Hearn was turning away from Catholicism, and at the urging of Henry Hearn Molyneux, a relative of her late husband, sent him to a Catholic college in France. Hearn was disgusted with the life and gave up the Roman Catholic faith. He became fluent in French and later translated into English the works of Guy de Maupassant and Gustave Flaubert.

In 1863, again at the suggestion of Molyneux, Hearn was enrolled at St Cuthbert's College, Ushaw, a Catholic seminary in County Durham, England. In this environment, Hearn adopted the nickname "Paddy" to try to fit in better, and was the top student in English composition for three years. At age 16, while at Ushaw, Hearn injured his left eye. The eye became infected and, despite consultations with specialists in Dublin and London, and a year spent out of school convalescing, the eye went blind. Hearn also suffered from severe myopia, so his injury left him permanently with poor vision, requiring him to carry a magnifying glass for close work and a pocket telescope to see anything beyond a short distance. Hearn avoided eyeglasses, believing they would weaken his vision further. The iris was permanently discoloured, and left Hearn self-conscious about his appearance for the rest of his life, causing him to cover his left eye while conversing and always posing for the camera in profile so that the left eye was not visible.

In 1867, Henry Molyneux, who had become Sarah Brenane's financial manager, went bankrupt, along with Brenane. As there was no money for tuition, Hearn was sent to London's East End to live with Brenane's former maid. She and her husband had little time or money for Hearn, who wandered the streets, spent time in workhouses, and generally lived an aimless, rootless existence. His main intellectual activities consisted of visits to libraries and the British Museum.

=== Immigration to Cincinnati ===
By 1869, Henry Molyneux had recovered some financial stability and Brenane, now 75, was infirm. Resolving to end his financial obligations to the 19-year-old Hearn, he purchased a one-way ticket to New York and instructed the young man to find his way to Cincinnati, where he could locate Molyneux's sister and her husband, Thomas Cullinan, and obtain their assistance in making a living. Upon meeting Hearn in Cincinnati, however, it became clear that the family wanted little to do with him: Cullinan all but threw him out into the streets with only $5 in his pocket. As Hearn later wrote, "I was dropped moneyless on the pavement of an American city to begin life."

For a time, he was impoverished, living in stables or store rooms in exchange for menial labor. He eventually befriended the English printer and communalist Henry Watkin, who employed him in his printing business, helped find him various odd jobs, lent him books from his library, including utopianists Charles Fourier, Hepworth Dixon and John Humphrey Noyes, and gave Hearn a nickname which stuck with him for the rest of his life, the Raven, from the Edgar Allan Poe poem. Hearn also frequented the Cincinnati Public Library. In the spring of 1871 a letter from Henry Molyneux informed him of Sarah Brenane's death and Molyneux's appointment as sole executor. Despite Brenane having named him as the beneficiary of an annuity when she became his guardian, Hearn received nothing from the estate and never heard from Molyneux again.

==== Newspaper and literary work ====
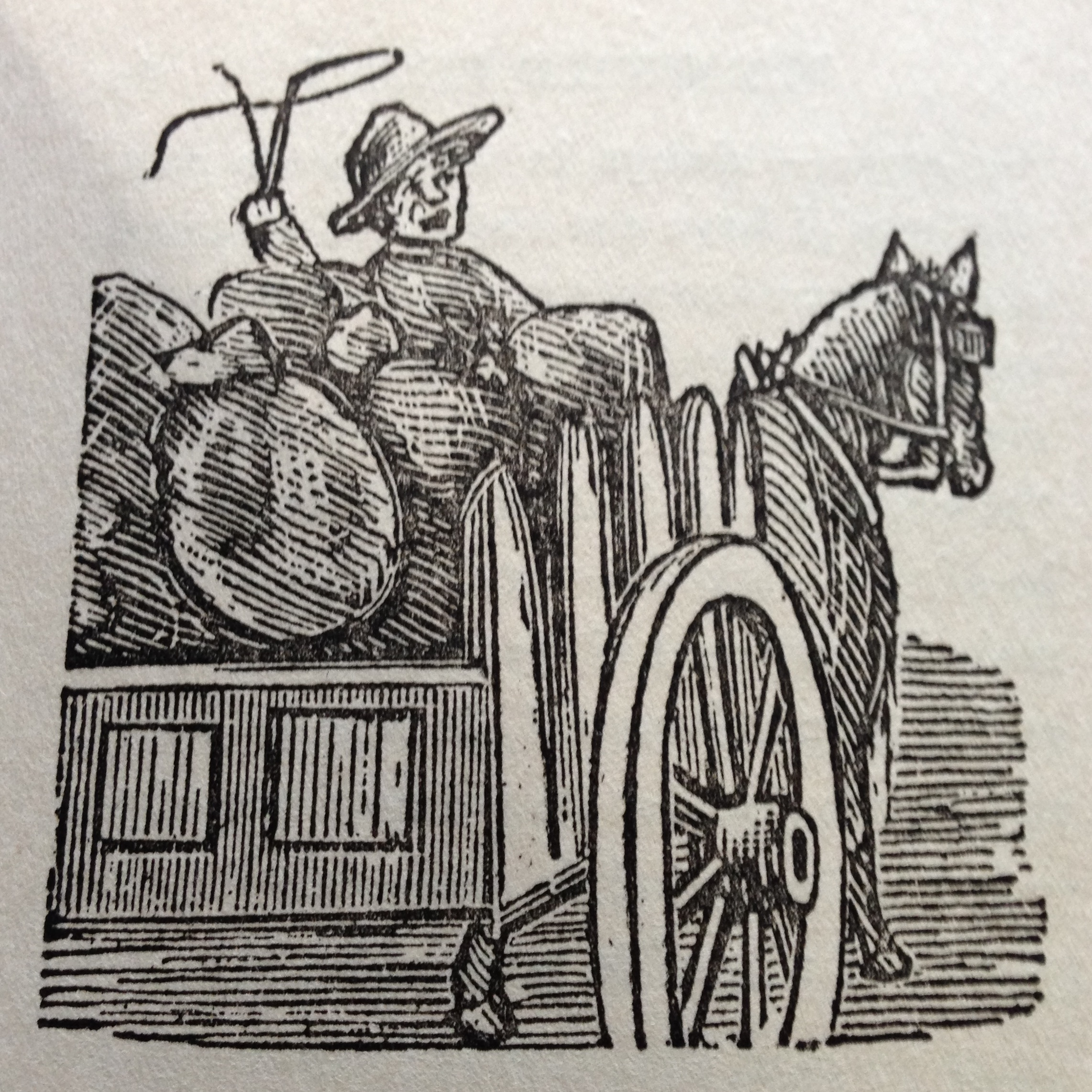
Char-Coal: Cartoon published in New Orleans Daily Item on 25 August 1880

By the strength of his talent as a writer, Hearn obtained a job as a reporter for the Cincinnati Daily Enquirer, working for the newspaper from 1872 to 1875. Writing with creative freedom in one of Cincinnati's largest circulating newspapers, he became known for his lurid accounts of local murders, developing a reputation as the paper's premier sensational journalist, as well as the author of sensitive accounts of some of the disadvantaged people of Cincinnati. The Library of America selected one of these murder accounts, Gibbeted, for inclusion in its two-century retrospective of American True Crime, published in 2008. After one of his murder stories, the Tanyard Murder, had run for several months in 1874, Hearn established his reputation as Cincinnati's most audacious journalist, and the Enquirer raised his salary from $10 to $25 per week.

In 1874, Hearn and the young Henry Farny, later a renowned painter of the American West, wrote, illustrated, and published an 8-page weekly journal of art, literature and satire entitled Ye Giglampz. The Cincinnati Public Library reprinted a facsimile of all nine issues in 1983. The work was considered by a 20th-century critic to be "Perhaps the most fascinating sustained project he undertook as an editor."

==== Marriage and firing by the Enquirer ====
On 14 June 1874, Hearn, aged 23, married Alethea ("Mattie") Foley, a 20-year-old African American woman who was formerly enslaved, an action in violation of Ohio's anti-miscegenation law at that time. In August 1875, in response to complaints from a local clergyman about his anti-religious views and pressure from local politicians embarrassed by some of his satirical writing in Ye Giglampz, the Enquirer fired him, citing as its reason his illegal marriage. He went to work for the rival newspaper The Cincinnati Commercial. The Enquirer offered to re-hire him after his stories began appearing in the Commercial and its circulation began increasing, but Hearn, incensed at the paper's behavior, refused. Hearn and Foley separated, but attempted reconciliation several times before divorcing in 1877. Foley remarried in 1880. While working for the Commercial he championed the case of Henrietta Wood, a former slave who won a major reparations case.

While working for the Commercial Hearn agreed to be carried to the top of Cincinnati's tallest building on the back of a famous steeplejack, Joseph Roderiguez Weston, and wrote a half-terrified, half-comic account of the experience. Hearn wrote a series of accounts of the Bucktown and Levee neighborhoods of Cincinnati, "one of the few depictions we have of black life in a border city during the post-Civil War period." He also wrote about local black song lyrics from the era, including a song titled "Shiloh" that was dedicated to a Bucktown resident named "Limber Jim." In addition, Hearn had printed in the Commercial a stanza he had overheard when listening to the songs of the roustabouts, working on the city's levee waterfront. Similar stanzas were recorded in song by Julius Daniels in 1926 and Tommy McClennan in his version of "Bottle Up and Go" (1939).

=== Move to New Orleans ===
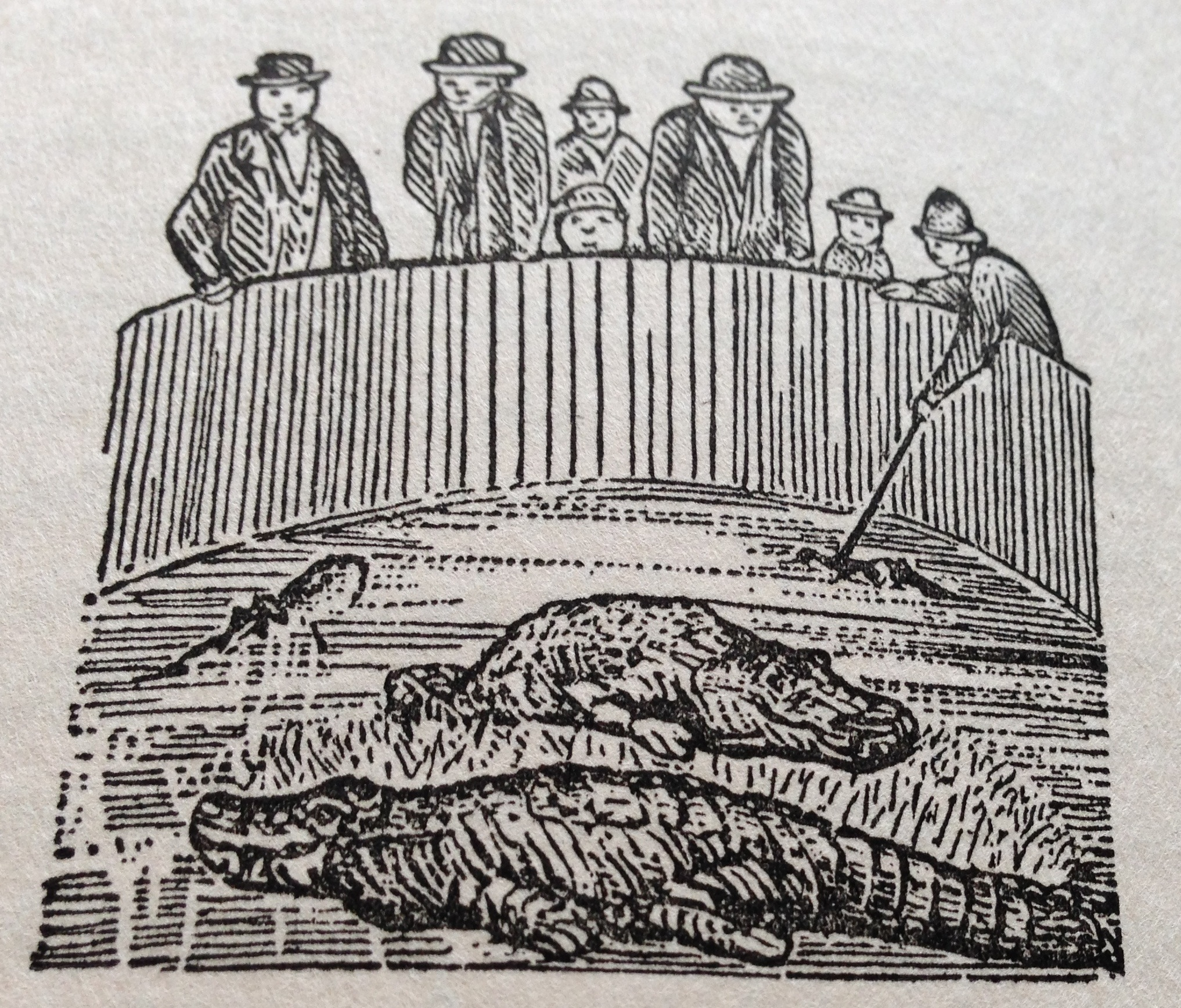
Alligators: Cartoon published in New Orleans Daily Item on 13 September 1880

During the autumn of 1877, recently divorced from Mattie Foley and restless, Hearn had begun neglecting his newspaper work in favor of translating works by the French author Théophile Gautier into English. He had grown disenchanted with Cincinnati, writing to Henry Watkin, "It is time for a fellow to get out of Cincinnati when they begin to call it the Paris of America." With the support of Watkin and Cincinnati Commercial publisher Murat Halstead, Hearn left Cincinnati for New Orleans, where he initially wrote dispatches on the "Gateway to the Tropics" for the Commercial.

Hearn lived in New Orleans for nearly a decade, writing first for the newspaper Daily City Item beginning in June 1878, and later for the Times Democrat. Since the Item was a 4-page publication, Hearn's editorial work changed the character of the newspaper dramatically. He began at the Item as a news editor, expanding to include book reviews of Bret Harte and Émile Zola, summaries of pieces in national magazines such as Harper's, and editorial pieces introducing Buddhism and Sanskrit writings. As editor, Hearn created and published nearly two hundred woodcuts of daily life and people in New Orleans, making the Item the first Southern newspaper to introduce cartoons and giving the paper an immediate boost in circulation. Hearn gave up carving the woodcuts after six months when he found the strain was too great for his eye.

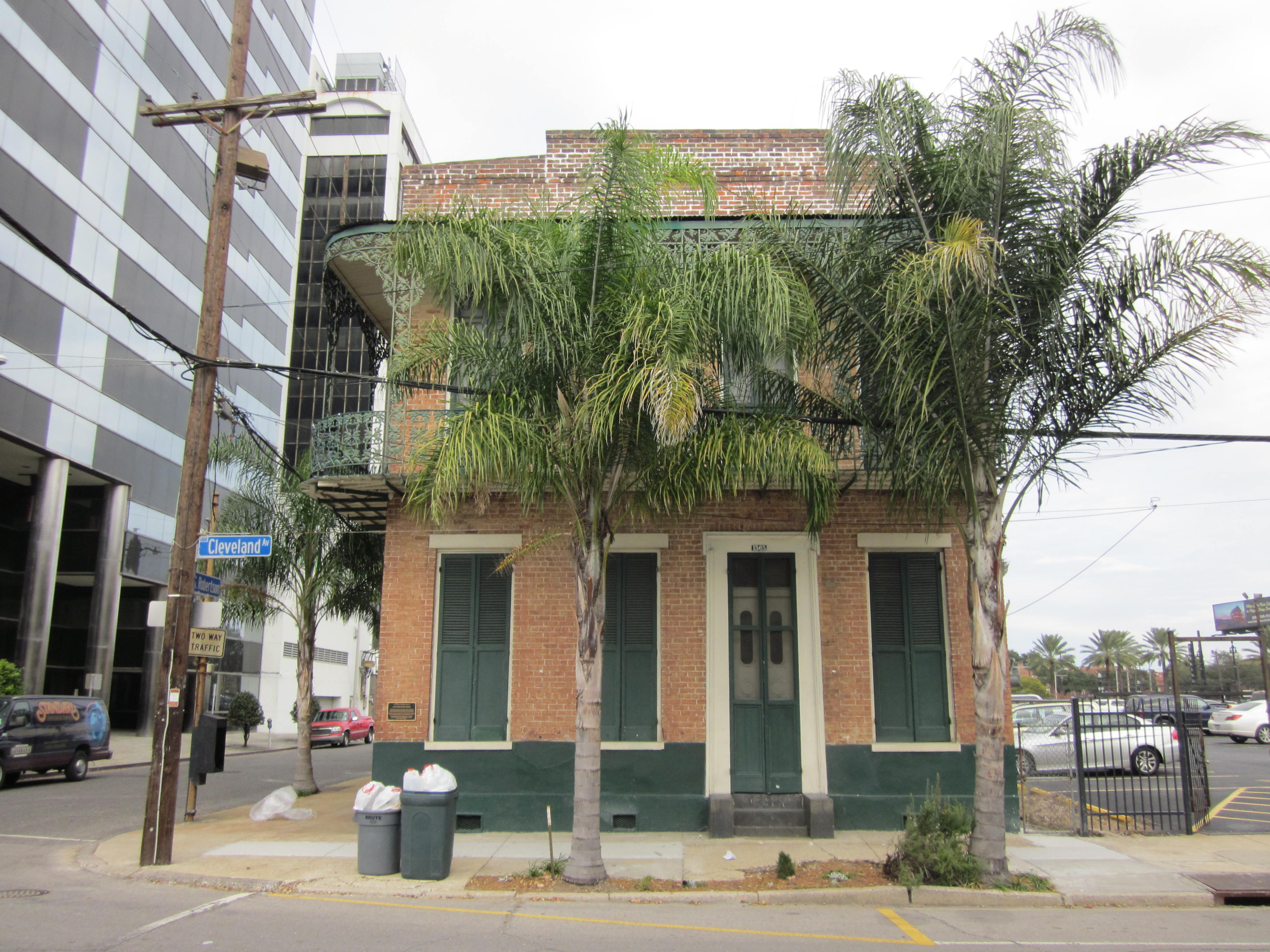
Hearn's former home on Cleveland Avenue in New Orleans is preserved as a registered historic place.

At the end of 1881, Hearn took an editorial position with the New Orleans Times Democrat and was employed translating items from French and Spanish newspapers as well as writing editorials and cultural reviews on topics of his choice. He also continued his work translating French authors into English: Gérard de Nerval, Anatole France, and most importantly Pierre Loti, an author who influenced Hearn's own writing style. Milton Bronner, who edited Hearn's letters to Henry Watkin, wrote: "[T]he Hearn of New Orleans was the father of the Hearn of the West Indies and of Japan," and this view was endorsed by Norman Foerster. During his tenure at the Times Democrat, Hearn developed a friendship with editor Page Baker, who went on to champion Hearn's literary career; their correspondence is archived at the Loyola University New Orleans Special Collections & Archives.

The vast number of his writings about New Orleans and its environs, many of which have not been collected, include the city's Creole population and distinctive cuisine, the French Opera, and Louisiana Voodoo. Hearn wrote enthusiastically of New Orleans, but also wrote of the city's decay, "a dead bride crowned with orange flowers".

Hearn's writings for national publications, such as Harper's Weekly and Scribner's Magazine, helped create the popular reputation of New Orleans as a place with a distinctive culture more akin to that of Europe and the Caribbean than to the rest of North America. Hearn's best-known Louisiana works include:

- Gombo zhèbes: Little dictionary of Creole proverbs (1885)
- La Cuisine Créole (1885), a collection of culinary recipes from leading chefs and noted Creole housewives who helped make New Orleans famous for its cuisine
- Chita: A Memory of Last Island (1889), a novella based on the hurricane of 1856 first published in Harper's Monthly in 1888

Hearn published in Harper's Weekly the first known written article (1883) about Filipinos in the United States, the Manilamen or Tagalogs, one of whose villages he had visited at Saint Malo, southeast of Lake Borgne in St. Bernard Parish, Louisiana.

At the time he lived there, Hearn was little known, and even now he is little known for his writing about New Orleans, except by local cultural devotees. However, more books have been written about him than any former resident of New Orleans except Louis Armstrong.

Hearn's writings for the New Orleans newspapers included impressionistic descriptions of places and characters and many editorials denouncing political corruption, street crime, violence, intolerance, and the failures of public health and hygiene officials. Despite the fact that he is credited with "inventing" New Orleans as an exotic and mysterious place, his obituaries of the vodou leaders Marie Laveau and Doctor John Montenet are matter-of-fact and debunking. Selections of Hearn's New Orleans writings have been collected and published in several works, starting with Creole Sketches in 1924, and more recently in Inventing New Orleans: Writings of Lafcadio Hearn.

=== Move to the French West Indies ===
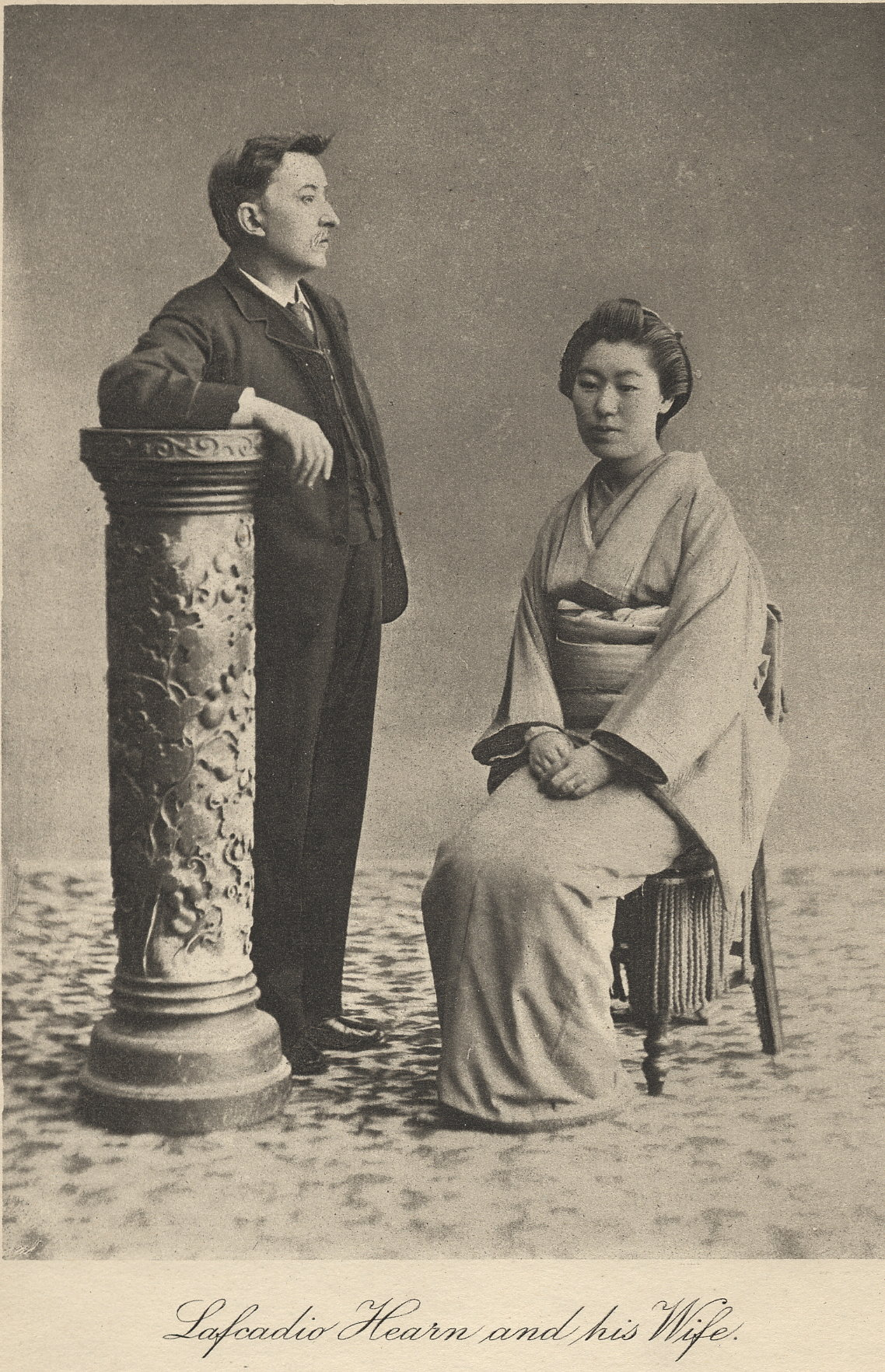
Hearn with his wife Setsuko—he preferred to hide his injured left eye in pictures.

Harper's sent Hearn to the West Indies as a correspondent in 1887. He spent two years in Martinique and in addition to his writings for the magazine, produced two books: Two Years in the French West Indies and Youma, The Story of a West-Indian Slave, both published in 1890.

=== Later life in Japan ===
In 1890, Hearn went to Japan with a commission as a newspaper correspondent, which was quickly terminated. It was in Japan, however, that he found a home and his greatest inspiration. Through the good will of Basil Hall Chamberlain, Hearn gained a teaching position during the summer of 1890 at the Shimane Prefectural Common Middle School and Normal School in Matsue, a town in western Japan on the coast of the Sea of Japan. During his fifteen-month stay in Matsue, Hearn married Setsuko Koizumi, the daughter of a local samurai family, with whom he had four children: Kazuo, Iwao, Kiyoshi, and Suzuko. In January 1896, he became a Japanese citizen, assuming the legal name Yakumo Koizumi (小泉 八雲, Koizumi Yakumo) after accepting a teaching position in Tokyo; Koizumi is his wife's surname and Yakumo is from yakumotatsu, a poetic modifier word (makurakotoba) for Izumo Province, which he translated as "the Place of the Issuing of Clouds". Born into the Protestant Hearn family, he was later Greek Orthodox, Roman Catholic, Spencerian, and then became Buddhist.

During late 1891, Hearn obtained another teaching position in Kumamoto, at the Fifth High Middle School (a predecessor of Kumamoto University), where he spent the next three years and completed his book Glimpses of Unfamiliar Japan (1894). In October 1894, he secured a job in journalism with the English-language newspaper Kobe Chronicle, and in 1896, with some assistance from Chamberlain, he began teaching English literature at Tokyo Imperial University, a position he held until 1903. In 1904, he was a lecturer at Waseda University.

While in Japan, he encountered the art of ju-jutsu which made a deep impression upon him: "Hearn, who encountered judo in Japan at the end of the nineteenth century, contemplated its concepts with the awed tones of an explorer staring about him in an extraordinary and undiscovered land. "What Western brain could have elaborated this strange teaching, never to oppose force by force, but only direct and utilize the power of attack; to overthrow the enemy solely through his own strength, to vanquish him solely by his own efforts? Surely none! The Western mind appears to work in straight lines; the Oriental, in wonderful curves and circles." When he was teaching at the Fifth High Middle School, the headmaster was Kano Jigoro himself, the founder of Judo.

== Death ==
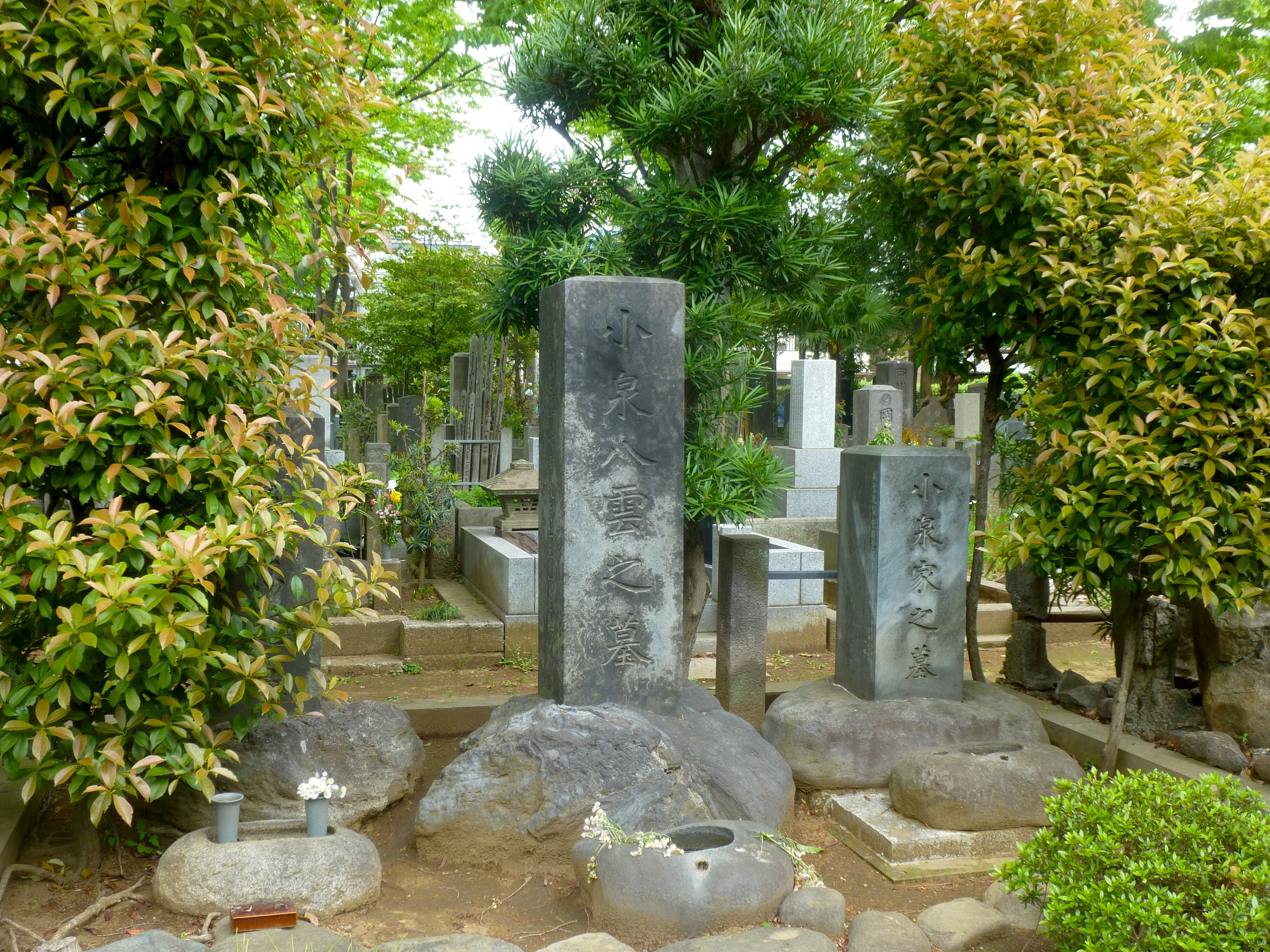
Hearn's grave in Zōshigaya Cemetery

On 26 September 1904, Hearn died of heart failure in Tokyo at the age of 54. His grave is at the Zōshigaya Cemetery in Tokyo's Toshima district.

Hearn's former residence in Matsue and his former residence site in Shinjuku are designated national historic places.

== Legacy ==
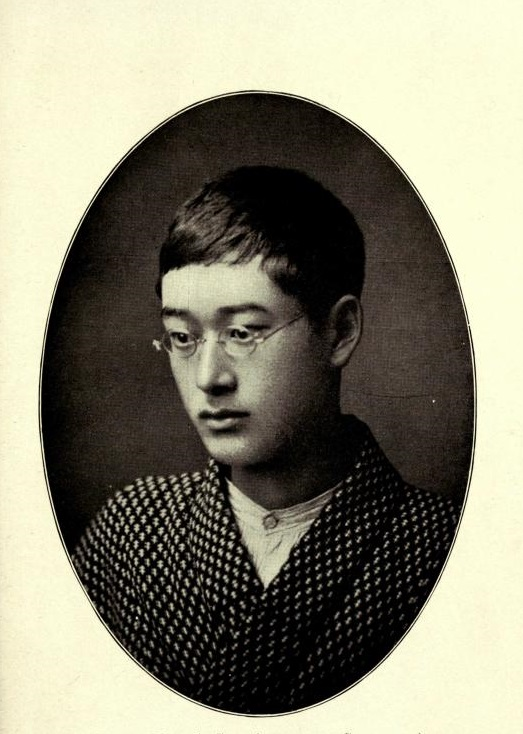
Kazuo, Hearn's son, aged about 17

=== Literary tradition ===
In the late 19th century, Japan was still largely unknown and exotic to Westerners. However, with the introduction of Japanese aesthetics, particularly at the Paris Exposition Universelle of 1900, Japanese styles became fashionable in Western countries. Hearn became known to the world by his writings concerning Japan. In later years, some critics would accuse Hearn of exoticizing Japan, but because he offered the West some of its first descriptions of pre-industrial and Meiji era Japan, his work is generally regarded as having historical value.

Admirers of Hearn's work have included Ben Hecht, John Erskine, Malcolm Cowley and Jorge Luis Borges.

Hearn was a major translator of the short stories of Guy de Maupassant.

Yone Noguchi is quoted as saying about Hearn, "His Greek temperament and French culture became frost-bitten as a flower in the North."

Hearn won a wide following in Japan, where his books were translated and remain popular to the present day. Hearn's appeal to Japanese readers "lies in the glimpses he offered of an older, more mystical Japan lost during the country's hectic plunge into Western-style industrialization and nation building. His books are treasured here as a trove of legends and folk tales that otherwise might have vanished because no Japanese had bothered to record them."

=== Museums ===
The Lafcadio Hearn Memorial Museum and his old residence in Matsue are still two of the city's most popular tourist attractions. In addition, another small museum dedicated to Hearn, the Yaizu Koizumi Yakumo Memorial Museum (焼津小泉八雲記念館), opened in Yaizu, Shizuoka, in 2007.

The first museum in Europe for Hearn was inaugurated in Lefkada, Greece, his birthplace, on 4 July 2014, as the Lafcadio Hearn Historical Center. It is located within the Cultural Center of Lefkada in the city of Lefkada. It contains early editions, rare books and Japanese collectibles. The visitors, through photos, texts and exhibits, can wander among the significant events of Lafcadio Hearn's life, but also in the civilizations of Europe, America and Japan of the late 18th and early 19th centuries through his lectures, writings and tales. The municipalities of Kumamoto, Matsue, Shinjuku, Yaizu, Toyama University, the Koizumi family and other people from Japan and Greece contributed to the establishment of the Lafcadio Hearn Historical Center.

On a trip to Matsue in 2012, Professor Bon Koizumi (Hearn's great-grandson) and his wife Shoko were introduced to Dublin-based Motoko Fujita, a published photographer of The Shadow of James Joyce (Lilliput Press Ltd., Ireland, 2011) and the founder of the Experience Japan Festival in Dublin. Acting on the Koizumi's desire to reconnect with their Irish roots, Fujita then coordinated a trip for Bon and Shoko in autumn 2013, during which relationships to more Lafcadio supporters in Ireland were forged. Fujita's initiative led to the exhibition Coming Home: The Open Mind of Patrick Lafcadio Hearn at the Little Museum of Dublin (15 October 2015 to 3 January 2016), the first time Hearn was honoured in the city. The exhibit contained first editions of Hearn's works and personal items from the Lafcadio Hearn Memorial Museum. Professor Bon Koizumi was in attendance at the opening of the exhibition. Fujita initiated the planning of a Japanese garden in Hearn's honour, and in 2015 the Lafcadio Hearn Japanese Gardens opened in Tramore County Waterford.

There is a cultural centre named after Hearn at Durham University, where in 2022 a conference, Lafcadio Hearn and the Global Imagination at the Fin de Siècle, was held.

=== Sister cities ===
His life journey later connected both its ends; Lefkada and Shinjuku became sister cities in 1989. Another pair of cities he lived in, New Orleans and Matsue, did the same in 1994.

=== Media and theater ===
The Japanese director Masaki Kobayashi adapted four Hearn tales into his 1964 film, Kwaidan. Some of his stories have been adapted by Ping Chong into his puppet theatre, including the 1999 Kwaidan and the 2002 OBON: Tales of Moonlight and Rain.

In 1984, the four-episode Japanese TV series Nihon no omokage (日本の面影; 'Remnants of Japan'), depicting Hearn's departure from the United States and later life in Japan, was broadcast with Greek-American actor George Chakiris as Hearn. The story was later adapted to theatrical productions.

Two manga book versions of Hearn's Japanese stories have been made by writer Sean Michael Wilson, who lives in Kumamoto, as Hearn did, and is also half Irish. These are The Faceless Ghost (2015) with Japanese artist Michiru Morikawa, and Manga Yokai Stories (2020) with Japanese artist Ai Takita.

The video game series Touhou Project is influenced by Hearn's works. This doujin series is about a fantasy world known as "Gensokyo", separated from "our" world with a magical barrier, which world was stuck on the late Edo period. Two of its characters, Yukari Yakumo and Maribel Hearn, are direct references to Lafcadio Hearn. Yukari is a yōkai who helped create the border separating Gensokyo from the outside world, and Maribel Hearn is a college student who is able to see Gensokyo in her dreams. Yukari Yakumo appears in many Touhou games, books and manga, and considered as "a mastermind who only takes action once its really required", and Maribel appears in the stories included in "ZUN's Music Collection", a series of music CD albums, from the second installment onwards, alongside another character, Renko Usami.

In September 2025, Japanese broadcaster NHK aired a drama series based on Hearn's life in Japan, The Ghost Writer's Wife. The series is based on the life of Hearn's wife Setsuko Koizumi.

== Works ==
Creole Sketches (readable)

=== Louisiana subjects ===
- La Cuisine Creole: A Collection of Culinary Recipes (1885)
- "Gombo Zhèbes": A Little Dictionary of Creole Proverbs, Selected from Six Creole Dialects. (1885)
- Chita: A Memory of Last Island (1889)
- Creole Sketches (1878-1880; published 1924) with illustration by the author

=== West Indies subjects ===
- Youma: The Story of a West-Indian Slave (1889)
- Two Years in the French West Indies (1890)

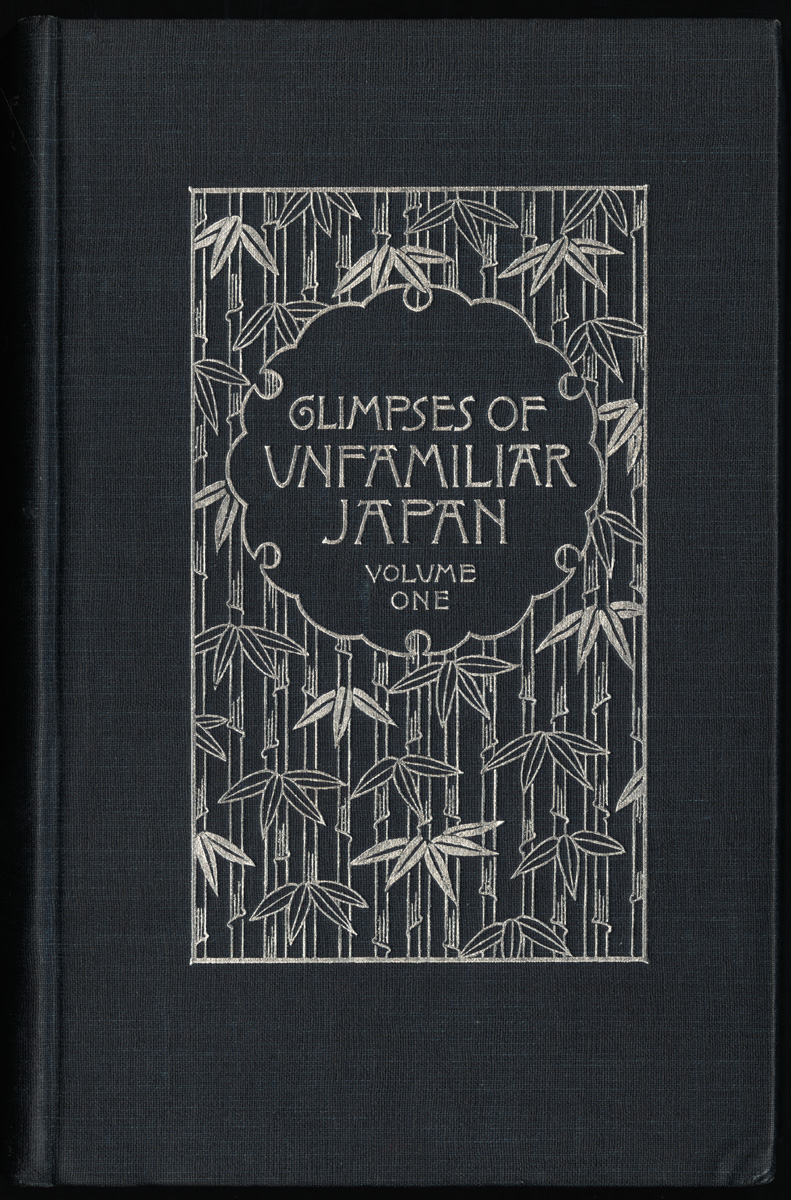
Glimpses of Unfamiliar Japan, 1895

=== Japanese subjects ===
- Glimpses of Unfamiliar Japan (1894)
- Out of the East: Reveries and Studies in New Japan (1895) – it includes "The Dream of a Summer Day"
- Kokoro: Hints and Echoes of Japanese Inner Life (1896)
- Gleanings in Buddha-Fields: Studies of Hand and Soul in the Far East (1897)
- The Boy Who Drew Cats (1897)
- Exotics and Retrospectives (1898)
- Japanese Fairy Tales (1898, and sequels)
- In Ghostly Japan (1899)
- Shadowings (1900)
- Japanese Lyrics (1900)
- A Japanese Miscellany (1901)
- Kottō: Being Japanese Curios, with Sundry Cobwebs (1902)
- Kwaidan: Stories and Studies of Strange Things (1904)
- Japan: An Attempt at Interpretation (1904)
- The Romance of the Milky Way and Other Studies and Stories (1905)

=== Posthumous anthologies ===
- Letters from the Raven: Being the Correspondence of Lafcadio Hearn with Henry Watkin (1907), includes Letters from the Raven, Letters to a Lady, Letters of Ozias Midwinter
- Leaves from the Diary of an Impressionist (1911, Houghton Mifflin Company)
- Interpretations of Literature (1915, Dodd, Mead and Company). This is a selection of his University of Tokyo lectures (1896-1902).
- Appreciations of Poetry (London: William Heinemann, 1916). This is a further selection from his University of Tokyo lectures (1896-1902).
- Karma (1918)
- On Reading in Relation to Literature (1921, The Atlantic Monthly Press, Inc.)
- Creole Sketches (1924, Houghton Mifflin)
- Lectures on Shakespeare (1928, Hokuseido Press)
- Insect-Musicians and Other Stories and Sketches (1929)
- Japan's Religions: Shinto and Buddhism (1966)
- Books and Habits; from the Lectures of Lafcadio Hearn (1968, Books for Libraries Press)
- Writings from Japan: An Anthology (1984, Penguin Books)
- Lafcadio Hearn's America: Ethnographic Sketches and Editorials (2002, University Press of Kentucky)
- Lafcadio Hearn's Japan: An Anthology of His Writings on the Country and Its People (2007, Tuttle)
- Whimsically Grotesque: Selected Writings of Lafcadio Hearn in the Cincinnati Enquirer, 1872-1875. (2009, KyoVision Books) Bilingual edition in English and Japanese.
- American Writings (2009, Library of America)
- Nightmare-Touch (2010, Tartarus Press)
- Insect Literature (2015, Swan River Press; for details, see Insects in literature)
- Japanese Ghost Stories. Murray, Paul, ed. 2019 London: Penguin. ISBN 9780241381274
- Japanese Tales of Lafcadio Hearn. Andrei Codrescu, ed. 2019. Princeton: Princeton University Press.

=== Translations ===
- One of Cleopatra's Nights and Other Fantastic Romances by Théophile Gautier (1882)
- Tales from Theophile Gautier (1888)
- The Crime of Sylvestre Bonnard by Anatole France (1890)
- The Temptation of Saint Anthony by Gustave Flaubert (1910)
- Stories from Emile Zola (1935)
- The Tales of Guy de Maupassant (1964)

=== Other ===
- Stray Leaves From Strange Literature: Stories Reconstructed from the Anvari-Soheili, Baital Pachisi, Mahabharata, Pantchantra, Gulistan, Talmud, Kalewala, etc. (1884, James R. Osgood and Company)
- Some Chinese Ghosts (1887)

== See also ==
- Goryo Hamaguchi
- Lafcadio Hearn's former residence (小泉八雲旧居)
