= Zōshigaya Cemetery =

Cemetery in Toshima, Tokyo, Japan

Coordinates: 35°43′22″N 139°43′11″E

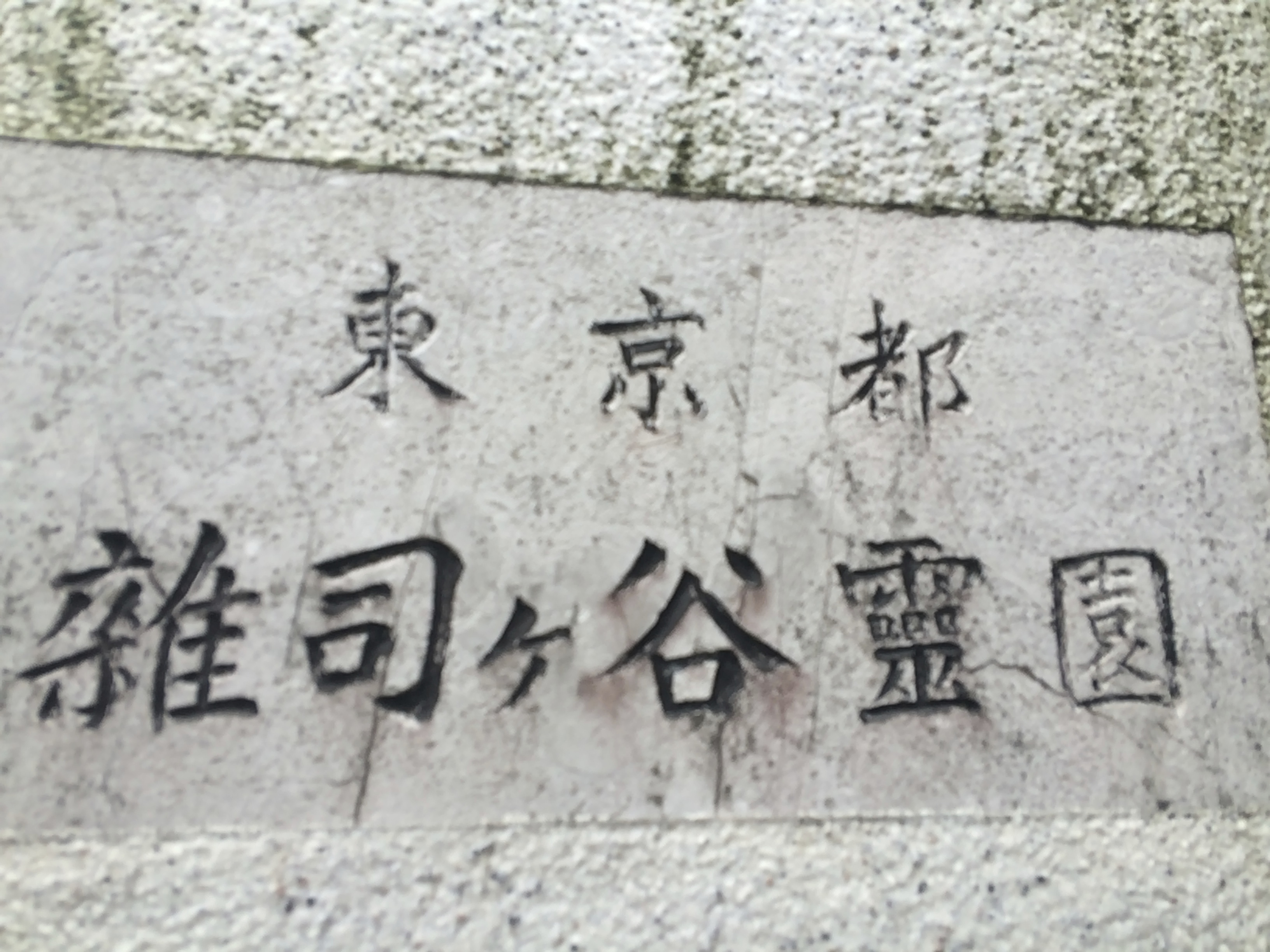
Signage at the entrance to the cemetery

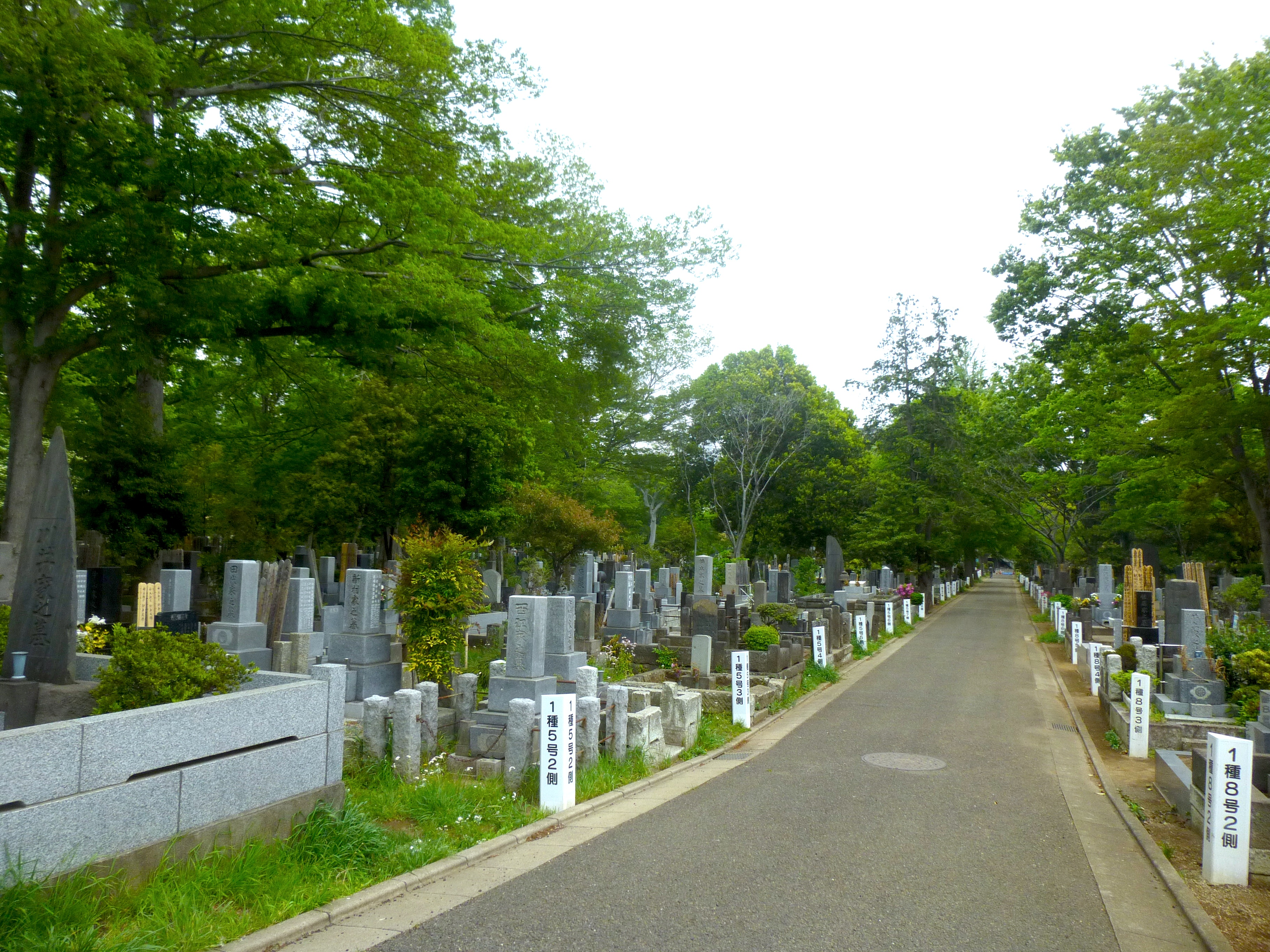
Pathway among the graves

Scenes inside the cemetery, 2023

Zōshigaya Cemetery (雑司ヶ谷霊園, Zōshigaya Reien) is a public cemetery in Minami-Ikebukuro, Toshima, Tokyo, founded by the Tokyo Metropolitan government.

The cemetery is nonsectarian, and contains the graves of many famous people in its 10 ha area. It is maintained by the Tokyo Metropolitan Park Association.

== History ==
Zōshigaya Cemetery was founded by the local government of Tokyo Prefecture in 1874 as a public graveyard following the policy of the new government of the Meiji period, which prohibited burial in the central part of Tokyo. Cremation was prohibited in 1873 and nine sites were designated new public graveyards in 1874. The local government of Tokyo prefecture established six cemeteries including Zōshigaya. Its construction and administration works were entrusted to the Tokyo Chamber (the Tokyo Chamber of Commerce and Industry of today). In 1876, the administration of the cemetery were taken into care by the prefectural government, and then by the Tokyo Metropolitan Park Association in 1985.

The name of the cemetery at first was Zōshigaya-Asahidechō-Bochi (雑司ヶ谷旭出町墓地); as Zōshigaya-Asahidechō was the name of the town in which it was located. It was changed to the current name of Zōshigaya Reien (雑司ヶ谷霊園) in 1935.

== Burials ==
Among those interred here are (Japanese surnames are in capital letters):

- OGATA Gekkō – Japanese painter and woodblock print artist of the ukiyo-e genre
- Lafcadio Hearn – International writer best known for his books about Japan
- Takio IZAWA – Japanese politician
- Kyōka IZUMI – Japanese writer of novels, short stories, and kabuki plays
- Kaita MURAYAMA – Japanese writer and painter
- KATŌ Hiroyuki – Japanese academic and politician of the Meiji period
- Hiroshi KAWAGUCHI – Japanese movie actor
- Matsutarō KAWAGUCHI – Japanese novelist, playwright, and movie producer of the Shōwa period
- Kyōsuke KINDAICHI – Japanese linguist
- KUBOTA Utsubo – Japanese lyric poet
- Kafū NAGAI – Japanese writer, playwright, essayist, and diarist
- NAKAHAMA Manjirō – One of the first Japanese people to visit the United States and translator
- Shōnen MATSUMURA – Japanese entomologist
- MORITA Sōhei – Japanese novelist and translator of Western literature of the late Meiji, Taishō and early Shōwa periods
- NARUSHIMA Ryūhoku – Japanese writer and scholar
- NATSUME Sōseki – Japanese novelist of the Meiji period
- OGINO Ginko – First licensed and practicing woman physician of Western medicine in Japan
- Shunrō OSHIKAWA – Japanese writer, journalist, and editor, best known as a pioneer of science fiction
- Yumeji TAKEHISA – Japanese poet and painter
- Seiji TŌGŌ – Japanese artist and painter
- Hideki TŌJŌ – Japanese general of the Imperial Japanese Army (IJA), the leader of the Taisei Yokusankai, and the 40th Prime Minister of Japan
- TSUNASHIMA Ryōsen – Japanese writer and philosopher
- Raphael von Koeber – German-Russian teacher of philosophy at the Tokyo Imperial University

== Cultural references ==
Before Natsume Sōseki himself was buried in Zōshigaya Cemetery, he selected the cemetery as the final resting place for the friend of the Sensei in the novel Kokoro (1914).
