= Raphael von Koeber =

Russian-German philosopher and musician

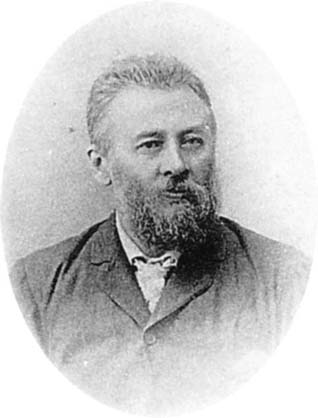
- Raphael von Koeber
- Born: 15 January [O.S. 3 January] 1848; Nizhny Novgorod, Nizhny Novgorod Governorate, Russian Empire
- Died: June 14, 1923 (aged 75); Yokohama, Kanagawa Prefecture, Empire of Japan
- Resting place: Zōshigaya cemetery Tokyo
- Education: University of Jena
- Occupations: Philosopher, educator, foreign advisor to Meiji Japan
- Employer: Tokyo Imperial University

Raphael von Koeber (Russian: Рафаэль Густавович фон Кёбер, romanized: Rafaèl' Gustavovič fon Këber; 15 January [O.S. 3 January] 1848 - 14 June 1923) was a notable Russian-German teacher of philosophy and musician at the Tokyo Imperial University in Japan.

== Early life ==
Raphael von Koeber was born in Nizhny Novgorod, Russian Empire. His father (a doctor) was ethnic German and his mother was ethnic Russian. His mother died when he was one year old, and he was raised by his grandmother, a daughter of a priest and tutor to Tsar Alexander II’s wife. She taught young Raphael the piano at the age of six, and greatly influenced him in his habits and studies. As an ethnic German, he was uncomfortable at school, which he therefore attended only irregularly. At the age of 19, he entered a music school in Moscow over the opposition of his father, where he was befriended by Tchaikovsky and Rubinstein. He graduated at age 24, but decided not to pursue a career as a musician due to his shyness, and instead went to Jena in Germany, where he studied natural history, and later philosophy at the University of Jena with Rudolf Christoph Eucken. After receiving his doctorate at the age of 30, he held teaching posts at Humboldt University of Berlin, Heidelberg University and the Ludwig-Maximilians-Universität München, mostly teaching music history and music aesthetics.

== Life in Japan ==
Koeber came to teach in Japan in June 1893, at age 45, based on the recommendations of his friend Karl Robert Eduard von Hartmann, who overcame his worries about the long sea voyage, earthquakes and having enough English language ability to lecture. He studied and worked for 21 years at the Tokyo Imperial University from 1893 to 1914 teaching philosophy, in particular, Greek philosophy, Medieval philosophy and aesthetics.

Koeber was known to be somewhat eccentric, and had fixed habits of reading, lecturing and playing the piano per a strict schedule. He rarely visited anywhere in Japan outside of Tokyo; he traveled to nearby Kamakura and once to Enoshima. He was indifferent about money and clothes, and wore the same winter clothes for 17 years.

His students included the famous writer Natsume Sōseki and the philosophers Nishida Kitaro and Watsuji Tetsuro. Koeber also taught piano at the Tokyo National Music School, which has now become a part of Tokyo National University of Fine Arts and Music. In 1901, he wrote the music for the opening of Japan Women's University. In 1903, Raphael also provided piano accompaniment for the first opera performed in Japan.

When the Russo-Japanese War broke out in 1904, Koeber refused to return to his country and the Japanese government did not make a political issue about his desire to remain in Japan. In 1912, Koeber's domestic servant from Munich committed suicide and Koeber was shocked by the incident. In the summer of that year, Natsume Sōseki called on Koeber, and later wrote about Koeber "a professor of noblest character" in his book Teacher Koeber (In Japanese: Koeber Sensei). He retired from his teaching position in 1914 and decided to return to Munich. However, immediately before getting aboard the ship at Yokohama, World War I began. Unable to travel and with no place to stay, he lived out of a room at the Russian Consulate in Yokohama for nine years until his death in 1923. His grave is at the Zōshigaya cemetery in Tokyo.

His collection of books, numbering 1,999 volumes and mainly consisting of Greek and Latin classics, and works on philosophy and literature is now at the Tohoku University Library.
