= Glimpses of Unfamiliar Japan =

1894 travel book by Lafcadio Hearn

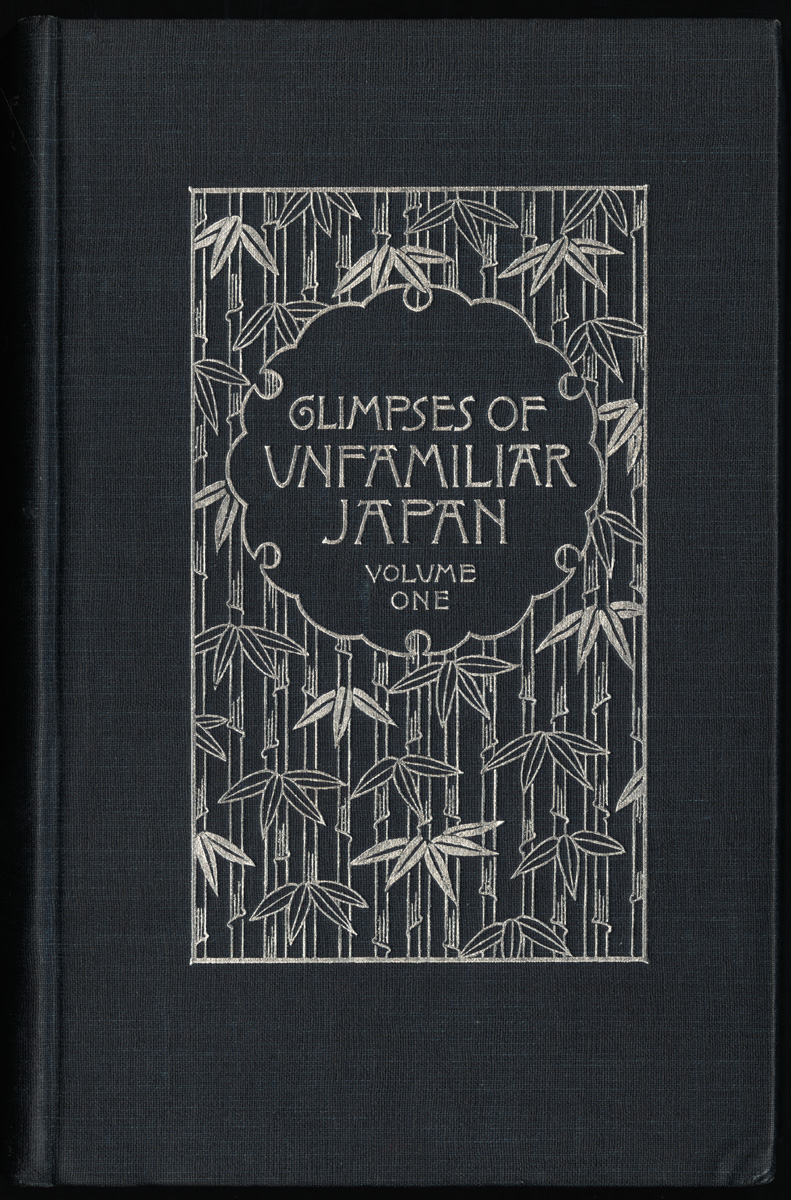
- Front cover (1895)
- Author: Patrick Lafcadio Hearn
- Cover artist: Sarah Whitman (1895 edition)
- Publication date: 1894
- ISBN: 978-1-4047-3071-7

Glimpses of Unfamiliar Japan is a book written by Patrick Lafcadio Hearn, also known as Koizumi Yakumo, in 1894. It is a collection of impressionistic travel sketches, reporting on Hearn's first travels in Japan between years 1890 and 1893. It is also the first works on Japanese culture Hearn published. After that, he released one book every year until The Romance of the Milky Way and other studies and stories (1905), published one year after his death in Tokyo in 1904.

Glimpses of Unfamiliar Japan was originally published in English but was later translated into several languages including Japanese and Polish. The original version book is divided into two volumes, containing seven and eight chapters respectively (fifteen in total). However, a later edition was published in one volume in 1907 by Bernard Tauchnitz. This edition contains only twelve chapters.

== Context ==
The Jesuits arrived in Japan during the 16th century. For nearly two centuries, however, Engelbert Kaempfer’s writings were the main source of scientific information for Westerners about the country. This changed with the beginning of the Meiji Era and the reopening of its trade barriers with the Western world, which had been exclusive only to Dutch markets before 1853.

Lafcadio Hearn was one of the main contributors to the dissemination of knowledge about Japanese culture during the nineteenth and twentieth centuries. Having spent his childhood in Europe (notably Greece, France, Ireland, and the United Kingdom), he moved to the United States at age nineteen, where he became a journalist and reported on several local cultures such as the Creole culture. Hearn went to Japan in 1890 and was initially sent there as a newspaper correspondent employed by an American firm, Harper's Magazine. Arriving in Yokohama, he obtained a job as a teacher in Matsue soon after his arrival, thanks to the influence of his friend and correspondent Basil Chamberlain. He continued to report on Japan and its culture and, one year following his arrival in Japan, started writing essays for the Atlantic Monthly, one of which eventually led to the publication of his book: Glimpses of Unfamiliar Japan.

Hearn was so enamoured with Japanese culture that he eventually settled in Japan, marrying Koizumi Setsuko. He was later naturalized as a Japanese citizen in 1896, two years after the publication of Glimpses of Unfamiliar Japan, and therefore has been described as having "gone native".

== Contents ==
Glimpses of Unfamiliar Japan covers a period of Hearn's life in Japan between 1890 and 1893. In the book, Hearn discusses several themes concerning Japanese culture such as religion (Buddhism and Shinto) and local folklore, and gives a detailed account of Japanese lands and people. Hearn describes an image of Japan that is mysterious and which intrigues him, which reminds him of an ancient civilization spared by what he believes to be a "Western contamination", as synonymous with modernization. Throughout his book, he explains in detail why he believes Japan would benefit neither by modernizing nor, as established in the preface, converting to Christianity, as this would erase the charms of Japan.

== Reception ==
Hearn's popularity was predominantly confined to the Western world during his lifetime. Because it was published in English, Glimpses of Unfamiliar Japan and Hearn's other books attracted a predominantly American readership up until the 1920s. The Western world demonstrated a great admiration of and interest in Hearn's work due to the contemporary Japonisme that had arisen from cultural and artistic expositions about Japanese culture, triggered by the reopening of trade between the West and Japan.

Of him, Basil Hall Chamberlain said that "[n]ever perhaps was scientific accuracy of detail married to such tender and exquisite brilliancy of style".

=== Criticism ===
Hearn has been accused of painting a misleading and romanticized picture of Japan after the Western world started fearing Japanese imperialism, which harmed his reputation.

During the 1970s, Hearn's reputation worsened, when Edward Said introduced Orientalism as a new form of doing discourse analysis. This framework led to the conceptualization of Hearn's works as exoticizing the Orient. However, other authors including Daniel Stempel and Paul Murray believed that this argument is unjust. They believe that Hearn was an anti-imperialist who should not be assimilated to other nineteenth-century travel writers and that his work still has historical value. They describe Hearn as a defender of the Eastern world and its values, jeopardized by modernization and Westernization. Other authors (including Roy Starrs) are nuanced in their criticism and believe that although he exhibited Orientalist features, he had "treated Japan in general and Japanese women in particular with a gentlemanly respect and consideration".
