= Faceless =

Faceless may refer to:

== Films ==
- Faceless (1988 film), a French slasher film
- Faceless (2007 film), an Austrian/British science fiction film
- Faceless (2016 film), a Canadian-Afghan action film
- Faceless (2025 film), an Australian psychological drama short film

== Music ==
- Faceless (Godsmack album), 2003 album
- The Faceless, American death metal group
- Faceless (Buried in Verona album), 2014 album
- "Faceless" (EP), 1991 EP by Impetigo, or the title song
- "Faceless" (song), 2010 song by Red

== Literature ==
- Faceless, 2001 novel by Martina Cole
- Faceless, 2003 novel by Amma Darko

== See also ==
- Faceless Creature, characters in DC Comics universe
- Faceless men, term from Australian politics
