= Human guise =

Concept of non-human beings disguised as human

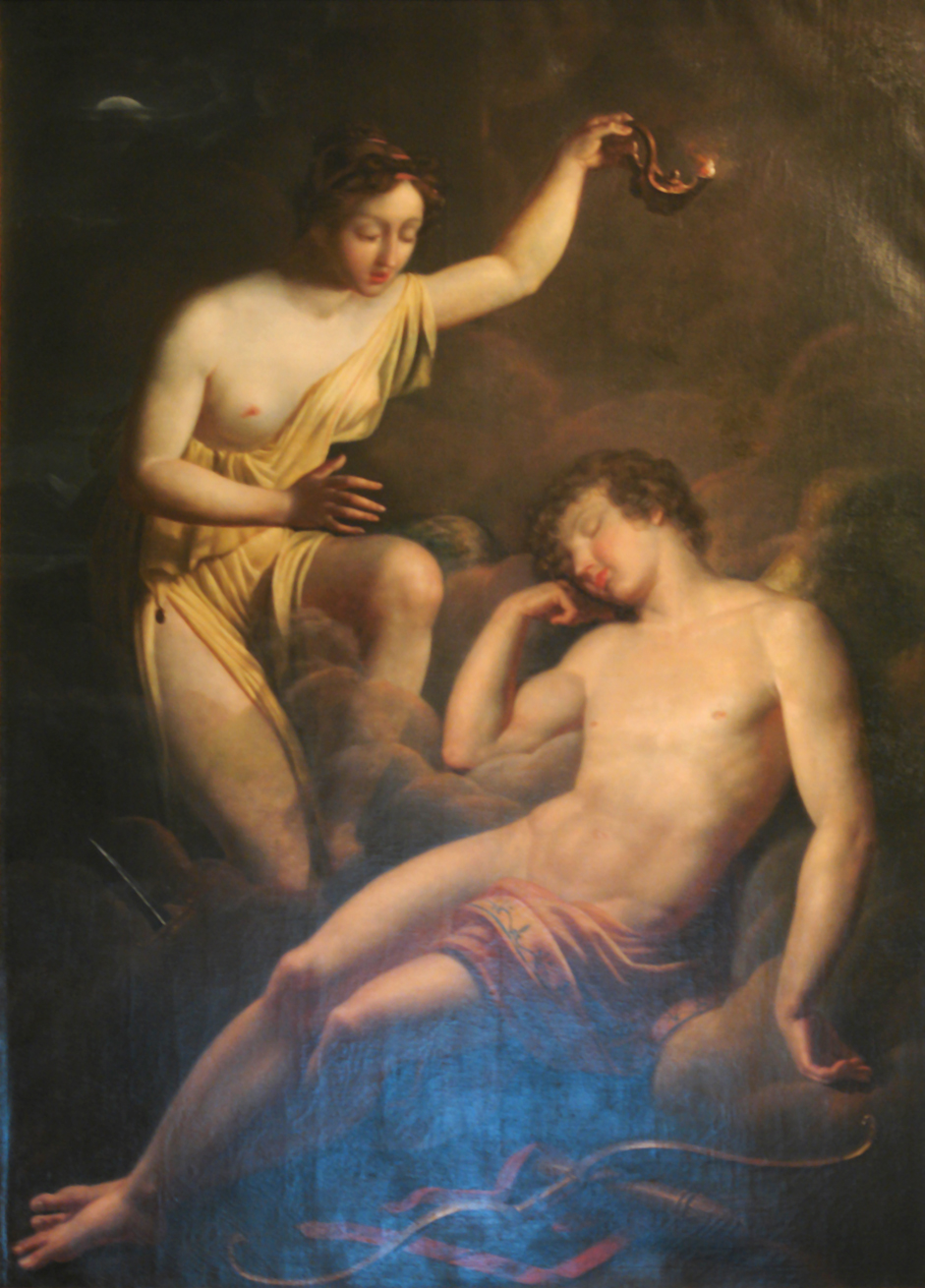
For the first time Psyche sees the true form of her lover Eros; darkness had hidden his wings

A human disguise (also human guise and sometimes human form) is a concept in fantasy, folklore, mythology, religion, literature, iconography, and science fiction whereby non-human beings – such as gods, angels, monsters, extraterrestrials, or robots – are able to shapeshift or be disguised to seem human. Stories have depicted the deception as a means used to blend in with people, and science fiction has used the dichotomy to raise questions about what it means to be human.

== In religion, mythology, and folklore ==
In pagan religions, deities often took on human form or disguise to carry out various tasks. The gods "of whom the minstrels sang" in Homer's Iliad watched the "human spectacle" as partisans, and came down to Earth invisible or in human disguise to interfere, sometimes to protect their favorites from harm (compare deus ex machina). Their human disguises sometimes extended to their getting hurt in conflicts. Zeus's human disguises have been compared to Plato's use of communicating through alternate characters as a means to express that the "essential philosophical nature is divine rather than human" and "cannot be represented without some element of human "disguise". In the borderlands between religion, myth, and literature, Dunn in his study of the concept of incarnation notes that Greek gods appeared disguised as humans in Ovid's legend of Baucis and Philemon.

In the Torah, angels only appeared to men in a human disguise, and never without one. In the Old Testament apocryphal Book of Tobit, the Archangel Raphael takes on human disguise and the name of Azarias. (Child and Colles note that '... he appears as a mere man, an archangel incognito as it were".) The Book of Genesis tells of three angels visiting Abraham in human disguise (Gen.18), and two visiting Lot in Sodom (Gen.19). Philosophy professor Peter Kreeft has asserted that when an angel wears its human disguise, human beings cannot penetrate the disguise due to the superior abilities angels possess; Kreeft cites as proof Hebrews 13:2: "... some people have entertained angels without knowing it." Child and Colles summarize: "The angels in the Old Testament were known to be messengers of God, sent to do his will, usually invisible and mysterious, but sometimes coming without wings in the guise of men."

St. Augustine and Christian scholars of that age agreed that the Devil could manipulate a person's senses to create illusions in the mind, constructing from particles of air fake human bodies that seemed quite real to those who saw them. John Milton's poem Paradise Regained has Satan disguised as an old man. The Christian heresy of docetism held that Jesus was not a human but was, instead, a divine spirit in the guise of a human.

Monsters like vampires and werewolves could purportedly take human form at certain times, and lore gave advice as to how to detect or drive away these seemingly human creatures. Even Red Riding Hood's Wolf (though presumably not a werewolf) could disguise himself as her grandmother. Stories are also told of mermaids walking in human form, such as Hans Christian Andersen's Little Mermaid, which is based on many such legends. Changelings are often described in Western European folklore as a type of legendary creature, left in place of a human infant, for a variety of reasons. They are usually not able to mimic the human perfectly, thus there are various ways to reveal them.

Religions such as Hinduism, Buddhism, and Native American beliefs have traditions whereby gods and spirits descend to earth in human form to help or hinder humanity. In native American myths "the sun, moon, and morning star seem free to take human form and roam the earth, seeking love and other adventures."

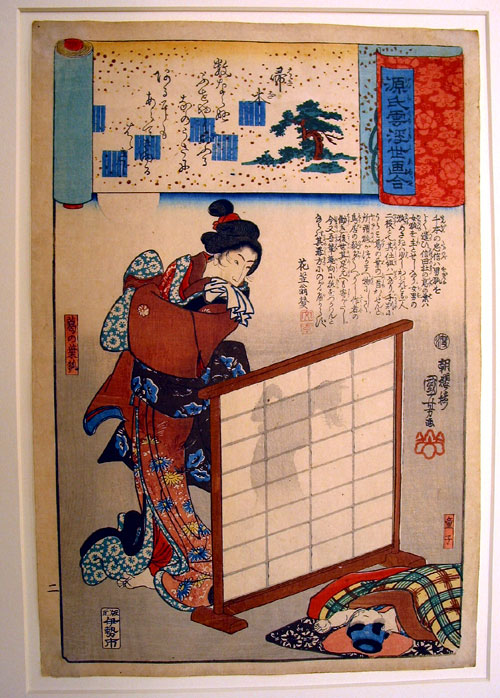
The kitsune Kuzunoha casts a fox's shadow even in human form. Kuzunoha, a popular figure in folklore, has become the subject of kabuki plays. Print by Utagawa Kuniyoshi.

In Japanese mythology, kitsune, or legendary foxes, often take on a human disguise; most frequently taking the form of an elderly man, an attractive woman, or a child. Kitsune can also replicate the exact appearance of a specific person. In medieval Japan, the belief that any beautiful women met alone at dusk was a kitsune was prevalent. In some legends, kitsune cannot fully transform, but maintain a tail or other foxlike characteristic such as long red hair. Some kitsune in disguise prey on humans through sexual contact, much like the succubus.

Other Japanese animals that (according to myth) can take human disguise include the bakeneko (ghost-cat), Bake-danuki (Japanese raccoon dog), mujina (Japanese badger), and jorōgumo (spider). Japanese-speakers call the category of such shapeshifting creatures obake or bakemono.

The wandering stranger (ijin, 異人) in Japanese folklore may turn out as a secret prince or as a priest... "And he can also be an avowedly supernatural being, outside the human race. The Wardens of certain pools, for example, who are believed to be snakes, and to be ready to lend lacquer cups and bowls to those who wish to borrow them for a party, are referred to as ijin. So are the uncanny yamabito or 'mountain people', said to be seven or eight feet tall, to be covered with hair or leaves, and to live deep in the mountains beyond human habitation. .... The Stranger is... possessed of powerful magic, but he is disguised as a filthy beggar. Be careful therefore how you treat strangers...." Generically, a stranger "may as easily be a dangerous incarnation of the Devil as a messenger from God".

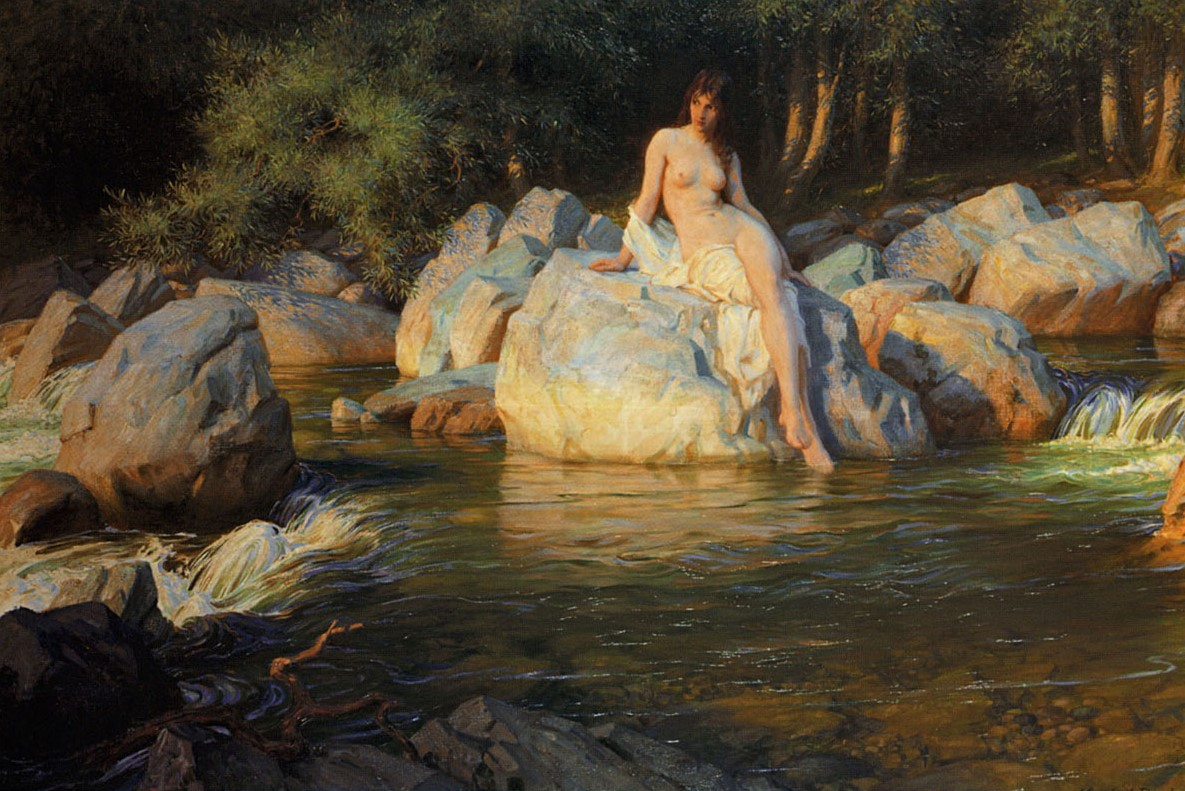
Kelpie by Herbert James Draper: transformed into a human

Selkie, seals which can shed their skin and turn into humans, appear in Faroese, Icelandic, Irish, and Scottish mythology, as well as in myths of the Chinook people, and are the premise of the film The Secret of Roan Inish.

== Art iconography ==
Roland Mushat Frye discusses a common iconographic tradition of Satanic disguise as a "falsus frater, as an old Franciscan friar, or as a hermit, often with a rosary, as Botticelli represented him in his Sistine Chapel frescoes".

== In literary criticism ==
In a study of multi-cultural literary traditions Quint traces examples of the recurring literary archetype of a disguised supernatural visitor: for example in Virgil's Aeneid and in Torquato Tasso's Gerusalemme liberata.

== In fiction ==
=== Supernatural creatures ===
Fiction may feature disguise for dramatic or comedic considerations. For instance, besides the aerial-daemonic Asmodeus and the undead-human Dracula, non-human primates have also been represented as vampires.

=== Aliens ===
Gary Westfahl wrote that Stanisław Lem and other writers use a standard argument: that "science fiction writers, as human beings, are inherently incapable of imagining truly alien beings, meaning that all aliens in science fiction are nothing but disguised humans."

Various works of science fiction have described aliens disguised in human form.

The theme of alien infiltration in human form appeared commonly during the Cold War. Jack Finney's 1955 novel The Body Snatchers, and the films made from it, involve aliens not only looking generally human, but replacing specific human beings, an intensely frightening prospect because one's own neighbors, friends, and family must now be suspected. It has been suggested that this conveyed the paranoia of the McCarthy era.

The various incarnations of Star Trek had numerous aliens capable of impersonating humans, for example the Salt Vampire of "The Man Trap", Trelane in "the Squire of Gothos", the Organians in "Errand of Mercy", the re-created historical combatants in "The Savage Curtain", among others from the original series; the Changelings (Odo's people) in Deep Space Nine; and the Suliban in Enterprise.

David Buxton's From The Avengers to Miami Vice discusses the use of human disguise in The Invaders, suggesting that though it might at first glance appear to be an extraterrestrial representation of the communist threat the show also picks up on deeper doubts regarding the American value-system.

The theme of infiltration continued in popularity into the closing stages of the Cold War in the 1980s. In the science fiction series V, the reptilian aliens wear human suits to pass as humans, trying to make humans feel more comfortable around them. They Live deviated from the cold-war fear of communists by having its alien infiltrators be the capitalist elite, exploiting mindnumbed consumers while The Thing featured a more visceral biological horror, with an alien that would infect and duplicate hosts. In the 1982 British sci-fi film Xtro, an alien spaceship abducts a father and an alien returns disguised as him. The alien rapes a woman and she gives birth to a fully grown man in what author Barbara Creed describes as being a primal "phantasy" where man is born fully grown and completely independent of its mother.

In the CW television series Supernatural practically all the supernatural creatures the protagonistic Winchester brothers encounter can assume human form, although there are a few exceptions to this, such as the Shtriga and the Wendigo. Most noticeable with the "human disguises" in the show are that of angels and demons. The true forms of angels are brilliant, amazing and overwhelming, as well as being as high as New York skyscrapers, forcing angels to possess humans whenever they manifest on Earth. The true forms of demons are destructive and deadly, forcing demons to forcibly possess humans. Other creatures, such as shapeshifters and the Leviathans, need samples of humans to take on their form.

Recently DC: The New Frontier returned to the cold war theme, using the character of the Martian Manhunter, "a shape-changing alien who adopts human disguise because he knows his alien form would scare people", to look back at cold-war paranoia and fear of outsiders.

In Roald Dahl's novel The Witches the titular creatures, the Witches, are effectively evil demons which assume human form. In their human form, they do not really fit comfortably within their human disguises, and even when they disguise themselves as human, they have several giveaway clues which can only be identified by truly observant individuals. Such individuals have formed an organization called Witchophiles who are dedicated to hunting down and killing the evil demons. In their human forms, witches have unnatural eyes, which flash ice and fire, and also they have long felinstic claws which they disguise with gloves. Their most notable feature is their bald heads, which they disguise with first-class wigs.

In Pandemic's 1950s-themed Destroy All Humans! video game, the Furon character Crypto, a gray-skinned alien, uses a holographic human disguise to infiltrate suburban United States. "In human form he cannot use weapons but is still able to use his mental powers to hurl objects and hypnotize people into becoming obedient slaves."

Some authors portray the mannerisms of aliens using human disguises as awkward, indicating that the aliens may not feel comfortable in their false skins, for instance Vincent D'Onofrio's portrayal of an alien "Bug" wearing a human suit in Men In Black.

Aliens in human disguise do not always have sinister motives: in Meet Dave, a group of aliens arrive in a spaceship shaped like a human being, and pilot it, to interact with the humans without getting noticed. In Starman the alien appears in human form, explaining it was so "you not be a little bit jumpy." In the Men in Black movie and comic book, alien immigrants disguised as humans inhabit the Earth; the alien prince of the Arquillian Empire lives as a human being with a pet cat.

Galaxy Quest and 3rd Rock from the Sun also use the meme. 3rd Rock from the Sun features a group of aliens given human bodies to observe aspects of human society.

An episode of Buffy the Vampire Slayer incorporates a praying mantis in human disguise, posing as a substitute high-school teacher who seduces her students before eating them. The mantis in disguise serves as a metaphor to suggest to younger viewers that rushing unprepared into sexual activity can result in being "devoured".

In the film Mimic, insects native to Earth are genetically modified to stop a cockroach-borne disease, but as a side-effect later evolve in size and shape to mimic and prey upon human beings.

In the live action remake of the film, Lilo & Stitch, Jumba and Pleakley, the two aliens uses the cloning device guns of human disguises to capture Experiment 626.

In Marvel Comics the Skrull, a race of aliens, commonly disguise themselves as humans to move about unnoticed on Earth.

A particularly notable and riveting form of human disguise appears in Larry Niven's Ringworld, specifically in the minor religion practiced by the Kdaptists, a religious order of Kzin who believe that the pinnacle of creation is not Kzin but man, and adopt a mask of human skin during prayer to attempt to trick God into thinking they are His children.

=== Robots ===
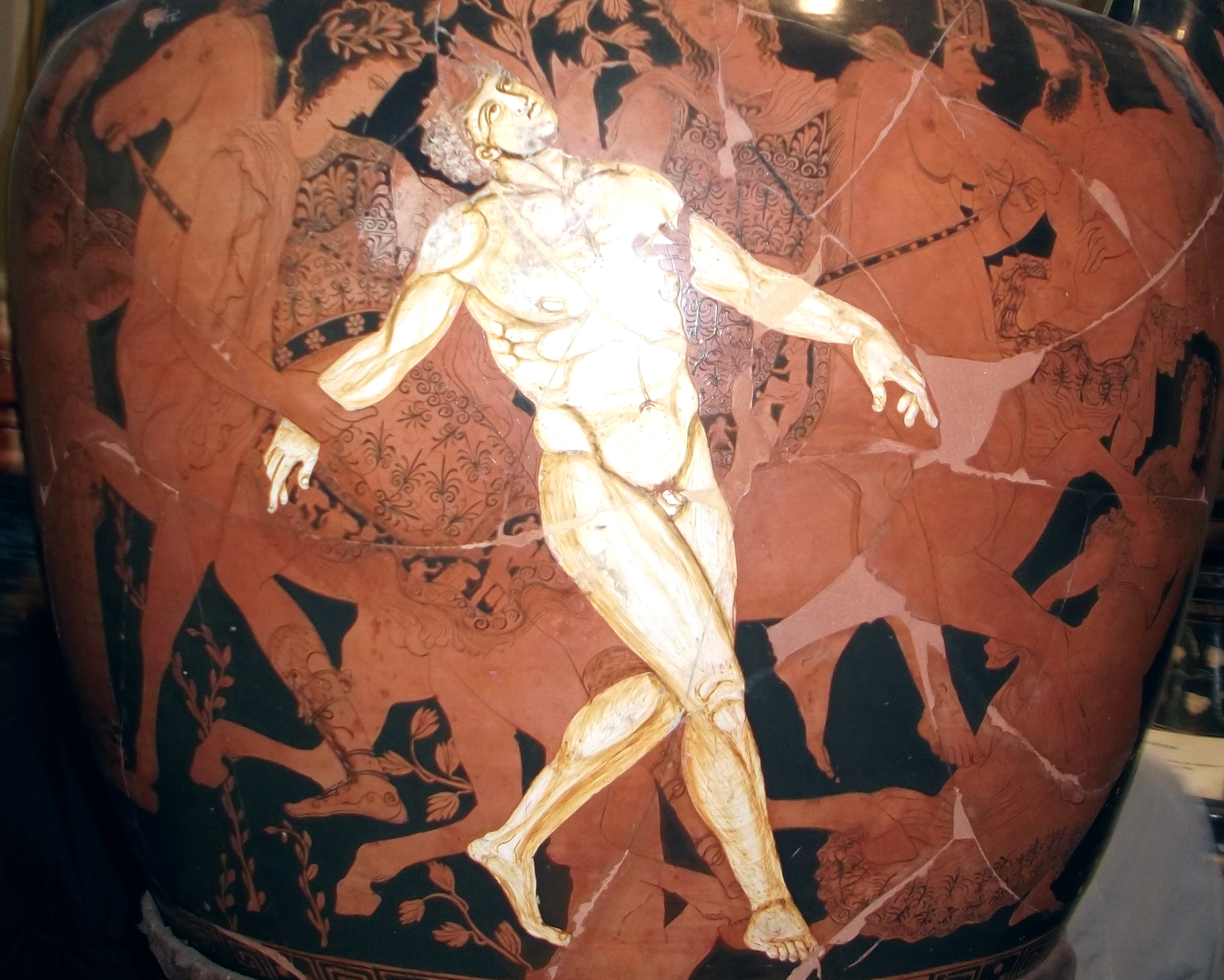
The death of Talos depicted on a Volute Krater circa 400 BCE (Jatta National Archaeological Museum in Ruvo di Puglia)

Possibly the first human automaton was Talos, a man made of bronze who defended the isle of Crete from invaders, with archaeological evidence dating from to c. 400 BCE at least. In some myths, the bronze man is defeated by the Argonauts by lancing the ichor-flowing vein in the ankle.

Isaac Asimov considered humanoid robots (androids) in the novel Robots and Empire and the short stories "Evidence" and "The Tercentenary Incident", in which robots are crafted to fool people into mistaking them as human. Some of Asimov's robots respond to human distrust and antipathy by passing as human and influencing human development for its own good. In Asimov's novella The Bicentennial Man, the robot Andrew gradually replaces his mechanical body with organic components, but only on the 200th anniversary of the start of his organic conversion, when he allows his positronic brain to "decay" and thus abandons his immortality, does he become accepted as "human".

In the movies A.I. Artificial Intelligence, and the Alien series, robots are made to look and act human. In The Terminator, Arnold Schwarzenegger played a cyborg that wore a human disguise.

In the 2010 Metroid game, the antagonist is a cyborg named Madeline Bergman who has been raised by the governing Galactic Federation and has effectively been kept in imprisonment on a derelict space vessel, thus making her gradually loathe humans. Madeline eventually plans to raid the Federation headquarters and destroy human civilization, but fortunately Samus Aran is called onto the scene by the Federation before this can occur.

The various Star Trek shows also had persuasive androids, for instance in the original series episodes "What Are Little Girls Made Of?", "Shore Leave", "I, Mudd", and "Requiem for Methuselah". In Star Trek: The Next Generation, the android Data's desire to become more human became an ongoing source of commentary on the human condition. (Data's positronic brain is a nod to Asimov's stories.) An earlier pilot-film by Star Trek's creator Gene Roddenberry, The Questor Tapes, had featured an android left on 20th-century Earth as the last of a series of advanced alien technology, with the same subtext. The three-season return of the USS Enterprise captain in Star Trek: Picard further explored the nature of androids and societal integration, especially throughout the first season as its main theme.

In Philip K. Dick's novel Do Androids Dream of Electric Sheep? and its film adaption Blade Runner, the replicants are biological robots indistinguishable from humans except by specialised testing of their empathic reactions. As those androids are manufactured exclusively for off-world colonies on Mars and are illegal on Earth they attempt to disguise as human to evade their killing by special police operatives.

Similarly in the remade series Battlestar Galactica, robots known as the Cylons have evolved the ability to make bodies that appear quite human. When killed, they transfer their consciousness from one body to an identical model elsewhere. This seeming immortality, the uncertainty of who is really human and who is Cylon, and the love between characters who are revealed to be human or Cylon, are used for discussion of what it means to be human.

Pretenders in Transformers are Autobots and Decepticons who encase their robotic bodies in organic-like outer shells. While most Decepticons use shells patterned after monsters, most Autobots use shells that appear human.

=== Cartoons ===
Human disguises sometimes occur in animation for cartoon characters. In a short story by Haitham Chehabi, Trix, a cartoon rabbit, wears a human disguise. Cartoons sometimes portray aliens drawn in human disguise. Note too the cartoon dragons passing as humans in Gnuff.

== Examples outside fiction ==
Commentators may use the concept of human disguise as a metaphor for a lack of humanity. For example, a Kenyan judge described the former Kenyan Prime Minister Jomo Kenyatta as a "monster in human disguise". Doug Parker, chairman of US Airways, was described as a "Klingon in a human disguise", after he "vaporized much of what was left of USAirways in Pittsburgh." [sic] The human disguise does not always carry negative connotations – in the US, a well regarded murder victim has been described as "an angel running round with a human suit on", while Manoel de S. Antonio, (Bishop of Malacca between 1701 and 1723) was referred to as an "angel in human disguise" for his conversion of 10,000 people to Christianity.

Some conspiracy theorists such as David Icke believe that aliens have assumed human form and control the world by masquerading as human leaders such as Queen Elizabeth II, George Bush and Tony Blair.

== Creatures ==
This table lists fictional creatures which pretend to pass as human.

Creature	Origin	Description
Changeling	European	A troll-, faerie- or elf-child, switched at birth for various reasons
The Devil	various	Believed to take on human forms in order to tempt people
Doppelgänger	Germanic	A ghostly double of a living person
Ghoul	Arabic	A malevolent jinn who likes human flesh. It can make all but its feet look human in order to lure the unwary.
Kitsune	Japanese	A fox which can take the form of a beautiful maiden, and which grows an extra tail every hundred years. A kitsune was said to be the mother of the legendary onmyoji Abe no Seimei.
Tanuki	Japanese	A Japanese raccoon dog which can take the form of a human, though without always achieving a perfect transformation. These are portrayed as the main characters of the Studio Ghibli 1994 animated film Pom Poko.
Noppera-bō	Japanese	Sometimes also called a mujina, At first appearing completely human, when approached it can wipe its face completely off, as though cleaning a chalkboard, leaving behind a featureless orb similar to an egg. Lafcadio Hearn introduced this entity to the West in his 1903 book Kwaidan: Stories and Studies of Strange Things.
Selkie	Scottish Celtic	A seal which can shed its skin to become a beautiful maiden. This is a leading character in the Cartoon Saloon 2014 animated film Song of the Sea.
Púca or pooka	Celtic and Norse	A creature of fortune and misfortune that shapeshifts across many forms and can be invisible; best known as the eponymous invisible six-foot rabbit Harvey in the 1950 film starring James Stewart.
Glaistig	Scottish Celtic	A spirit, a type of fuath, also known as maighdean uaine, the Green Maiden, and may appear as a woman of great beauty.
Beatha Greimach	Scottish Celtic	[lit. "the breath thief"] A Celtic shapeshifting undead wight, Sìthe, or demonic creature that can appear in many forms, including human, to take the living breath from passing travellers. The related baobhan sith adopts a seductive female form similar to a succubus.
Vampire	Pan-African, Asian mythologies, and European	An undead consumer of blood which, in some traditions, passes for human in order to attain blood. Originally, more associated with creatures in a female form – exemplified by Lilith of Semitic mythology and Lilim of Greek mythology – and in Joseph Sheridan Le Fanu's 1872 novel Carmilla, but is better known today as characterized in the saturnine male figure in Bram Stoker's 1897 novel Dracula, reproduced in a great many feature films.

== See also ==
- Anthropomorphism
- Anthropotheism
- Humanoid
- Incarnation
- Liminal being
- Plot device
- Reptilians
- Shapeshifting
- Stock character
