= Beyond the Horizon =

Beyond the Horizon may refer to:

- Beyond the Horizon (play), a play by Eugene O'Neill
- Beyond the Horizon (film), a 2005 Myanmar film
- Beyond This Horizon (novel), a 1942 science fiction novel by Robert A. Heinlein
- Beyond the Horizon, a 1960 Bulgarian film directed by Zahari Zhandov
- Beyond the Horizon, a 2009 docudrama film with a screenplay co-written by Leonard Mlodinow
- Beyond the Horizon (Más Allá del Horizonte), an Argentine telenovela
- Beyond the Horizon (novel), a 1995 novel by Amma Darko

In music:

- Beyond the Horizon (People in Planes album), an album by People in Planes
- Beyond the Horizon, an album by The Marshall Tucker Band
- "Beyond the Horizon", a song by Bob Dylan from Modern Times
- "Beyond the Horizon", a song by Dissection from Reinkaos
- Beyond the Horizon, a 25-minutes piece for brass band, written by Bertrand Moren for the Brass Band Treize Etoiles (Switzerland)
- Beyond the Horizon, an opera by American composer Nicolas Flagello
- Silk Road Journeys: Beyond the Horizon, a 2004 album by Yo-Yo Ma and the Silk Road Ensemble
