= Human form =

Human form may refer to:

- Human figure, the artistic study of human body shape
  - Figure drawing, a drawing of the human form
- Human guise, the concept in mythology and fiction for a being to take human appearance
