= Feitouman =

Chinese legendary creature

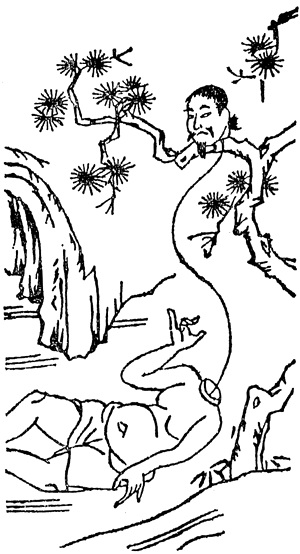
An example of the depiction in Japan. "Hitoban" (Feitouman) from the Wakan Sansai Zue.

The Feitouman (Chinese: 飛頭蠻; pinyin: Fēitóumán) or Hitoban (Japanese reading) is a yaoguai or legendary creature found in Chinese folklore. It is also known as the Luotoumin (Chinese: 落頭民; pinyin: Luòtóumín; lit. 'Drop-Head People') or Chongluo (Chinese: 虫落; pinyin: Chóngluò).

While they usually appear in the form of humans, their heads separate from their bodies at night and fly through the air, returning to the body by morning.

== Overview and Records ==
=== Luotoumin (The Drop-Head People) ===
In volume 12 of the Soushen Ji (In Search of the Supernatural), written by Gan Bao during the Jin Dynasty, there is a record of the "Luotoumin" (Drop-Head People). Legend has it that during the Three Kingdoms period, the Eastern Wu general Zhu Huan encountered one.

Zhu Huan had a maidservant whose head would automatically fly off every night after she fell asleep. It would enter and exit through the skylight, using its ears as wings, and return just before dawn. One night, the maid's head flew off again. Her female roommate, seeing her in a haze, noticed the quilt on her body had slipped off. With good intentions, she pulled the quilt up, unintentionally covering the opening on the maid's neck.

When the maid's head tried to fly back to its original position in the morning, it could not find the body because it was covered by the quilt. It fell to the ground, gasping for breath and on the verge of death. Zhu Huan entered the room and witnessed this shocking scene. The maid's head kept signaling toward the quilt with its eyes. Realizing what had happened, Zhu Huan immediately pulled back the quilt. The maid, retaining only a sliver of life, used all her strength to fly her head back onto her neck, thereby returning to normal. Although Zhu Huan saved the flying-head maid's life, he felt a lingering unease and viewed the "Luotoumin" as an ominous anomaly, eventually sending the maid away.

In the Soushen Ji account, observers noted the headless body became slightly cold and the breathing faint. In addition to the quilt story, there are versions where someone covered the torso with a copper basin; in that case, the head could not return to the torso and the maid eventually died.

=== Chongluo and Flying-Head Barbarians ===
The Ming dynasty scholar Lang Ying, citing the Luochong Ji (Record of Naked Creatures) in his work Qixiu Leigao, recorded that people in the country of Laos could drink liquids through their noses and their heads could fly off to eat fish. Huan Tan's Xinlun (New Discussions) contains similar records, mentioning "nose-drinking barbarians in Jingzhou" and "head-flying barbarians in Nancheng."

According to the encyclopedia Sancai Tuhui, there are people in "Great Java" (referring to the island of Java) whose heads fly. A defining characteristic is that their eyes lack pupils. Locally, they are called "Chongluo" or "Luomin" (meaning people whose heads fall off).

=== Shitouman (Corpse Head Barbarian) ===
The Yingya Shenglan (The Overall Survey of the Ocean's Shores) records the "Shitouman" (Corpse Head Barbarian) in the kingdom of Champa (modern-day Vietnam). Their eyes lack pupils, distinguishing them from ordinary humans. When they sleep at night, their heads fly away to eat the feces of other people's children. The children whose stomachs are invaded by this demonic qi (energy) will inevitably die.

The Xingcha Shenglan (The Overall Survey of the Star Raft) records that among the women of Champa, there are those whose heads fly. If someone knows of this and seals the neck (while the head is gone), and moves the body, the woman will die.

=== The Separating People ===
The Shiyi Ji (Record of Gleanings) records that during the reign of Emperor Wu of Han, to the east of the Yinchi country, there were people capable of separating their bodies. They could make their heads fly to the South Sea, their left hands fly to the East Sea, and their right hands fly to the West Sea. At dusk, the head would return to the shoulders, but the two hands could be blown overseas if they encountered strong winds.

=== Feitou Liao (Flying Head Liao) ===
According to the Tang dynasty text Nanfang Yiwu Zhi (Records of Strange Things in the South), the "Feitouman" living in the caves of Lingnan (the region from southern China to Vietnam) are characterized by a red scar on their necks. At night, they use their ears like wings to fly around and eat insects, returning to their original bodies when day breaks.

The Northern Song dynasty encyclopedia Taiping Guangji describes them under the name "Feitou Liao" (Flying Head Liao; Chinese: 飛頭獠; pinyin: Fēitóuliáo). The day before their head flies, a mark resembling a red streak appears on their neck. On the night of the event, they appear like sick people; the head separates from the torso, goes to the riverbank, and eats things like crabs and earthworms. In the morning, they return. They appear as if waking from a dream and understand nothing of what happened, yet their stomachs are full.

The Youyang Zazu (Miscellaneous Morsels from Youyang), Former Collection Volume 4, also records that during the Tang Dynasty, in the southwest of Longcheng in Lingnan, there were "Feitou Liaozi" (Flying Head Liao-ones) whose heads could fly back and forth.

== Connection with Similar Creatures ==
=== Rokurokubi (Japan) ===
The Rokurokubi is a yōkai in Japanese folklore. While some are depicted with necks that elongate—often seen in freak shows (misemono) or haunted houses—there is also a type where the head separates from the torso and flies around. This type is found in tales such as the Sorori Monogatari and Shokoku Hyaku Monogatari, as well as in the story "Rokurokubi" in Lafcadio Hearn's Kwaidan. This flying type is believed to be derived from the Chinese Feitouman.

In the Edo period yōkai art collection Gazu Hyakki Yagyō, the kanji for "Feitouman" (Hitoban) are used to write "Rokurokubi". Similarly, the Edo period ghost story collection Kokon Hyaku Monogatari Hyoban mentions that a characteristic of the Rokurokubi is a bruise on the neck, a description similar to that found in the Nanfang Yiwu Zhi and Taiping Guangji.

=== La uma or Chonchon (South America) ===
In Peru, South America, there is a legend of a being called the la uma whose head detaches and flies around. The flying head is said to eat other human heads to replace the person, or to suck blood. Additionally, in Chile, there is a legend of a flying head creature called the Chonchon (or Chonchonyi).

=== Penanggalan (Southeast Asia) ===
In the Malay Peninsula and surrounding regions, there are legends of beings such as the Penanggalan, where the head flies through the sky with the internal organs still attached.

== See also ==
- Flying Head (Iroquois legend)
- Rokurokubi
- Folklore studies
- Penanggalan
- List of supernatural beings in Chinese folklore
- Soushen Ji
- Dullahan
