= Nuppeppō =

Yōkai

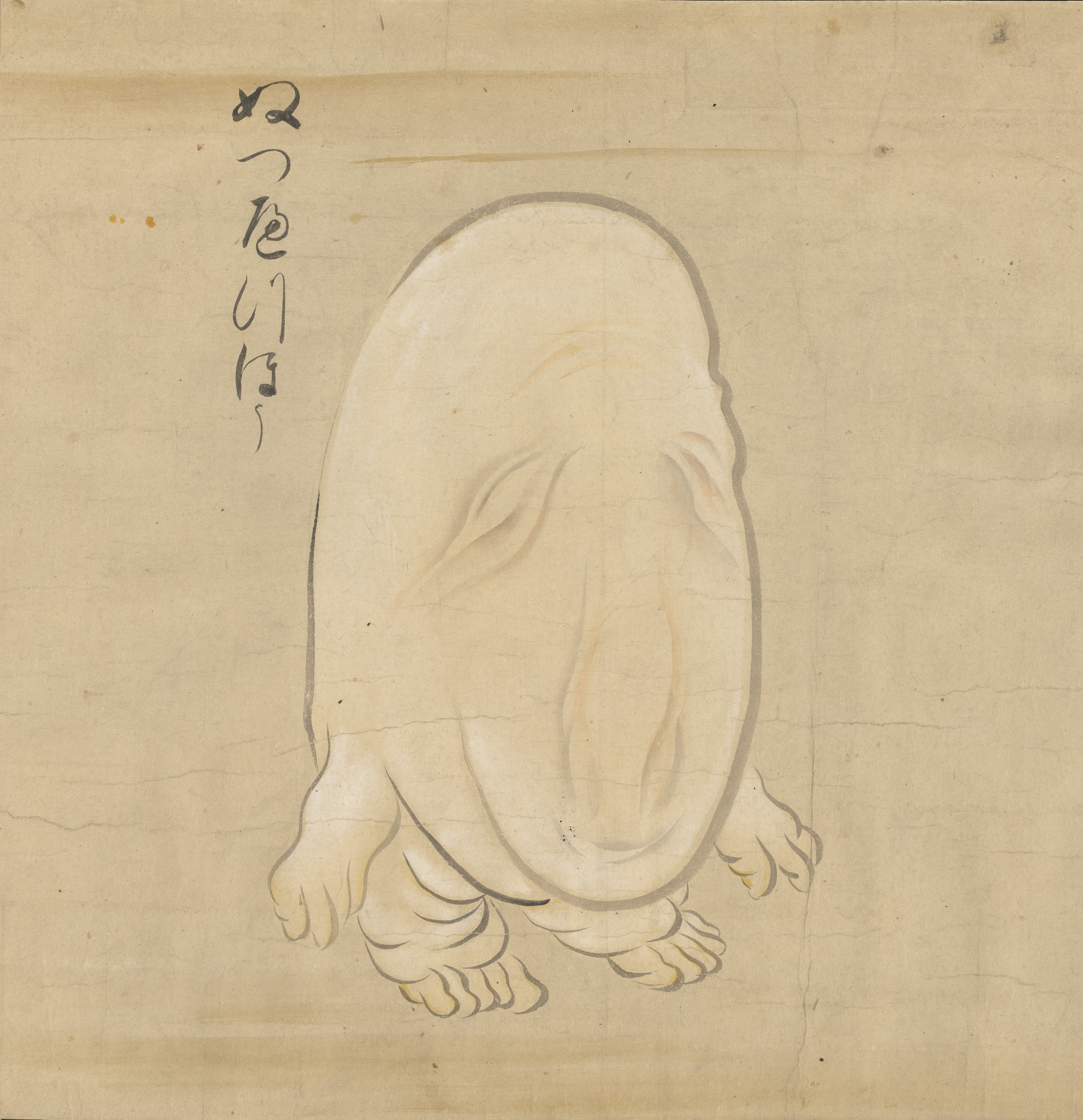
Nuppeppō (ぬつへつほう) from Bakemono no e (化物之繪, c. 1700), Harry F. Bruning Collection of Japanese Books and Manuscripts, L. Tom Perry Special Collections, Harold B. Lee Library, Brigham Young University.

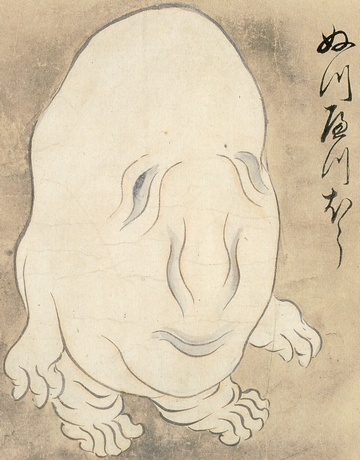
"Nuppepō" (ぬつへつほう) from the Hyakkai Zukan by Sawaki Suushi

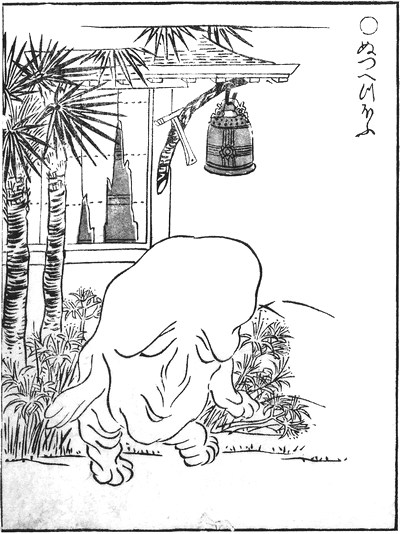
"Nuppepō" (ぬつへつほふ) from the Gazu Hyakki Yagyō by Toriyama Sekien

The nuppeppō (Japanese: ぬっぺふほふ or ぬっぺっぽう) is a yōkai that appears in Edo Period yōkai emaki such as the Gazu Hyakki Yagyō and the Hyakkai Zukan. It is depicted with indistinguishable wrinkles on its face and body as a one head blob of meat.

== Concept ==
In the emaki, it has nothing more than a name and picture, and there is almost no explanatory text, but from its name and the passage "there is a monster (bakemono) called nuppeppō. It has neither eye nor ear" (ぬっぺっぽうといふ化けもの有り。目もなく耳も無く) from the sharebon (silly tales book) Shingo Zade Hōdai Mōgyū ("Shingo Left All You Can Eat Blind Cow") (新吾左出放題盲牛) (1781), it is seen as a type of noppera-bō. In an old picture book manuscript (year unknown) held at the Shisui Library, Inui Yūhei portrayed a yōkai called "nubbehhō" (ぬっべっほう), and it is introduced with the words "it is called the disguised form of an old toad, similar to the fox or tanuki." This "nubbehhō" picture comes with the words, "a monster that's a very wrinkly sweet potato with four short limbs." The aforementioned Shingo Zade Hōdai Mōgyū also writes, "it sucks the fat of the dead and eats to the fullest with a needle. In the past, they'd come disguised as a doctor, but now they just come as is......" (死人の脂を吸い、針大こくを喰う。昔は医者に化けて出てきたが、今はそのまま出てくる……).

Also, the yōkai researcher Katsumi Tada notes that while in modern times, the nopperabō is known as the yōkai with no eyes or nose on its face, in older times it was shaped like this nuppeppō with no distinction between face and body. It is said that it smears ("nupperi") itself with white face powder, called "whitening" (白化), but this "whitening" has the meanings "pretending not to know, feigning ignorance," "deceive by pretending to speak frankly," "become open and unconcealed," "apply white facial powder," and "white monster," among others. It is said that as an embodiment of this "whitening," the nuppepō would first impersonate a human (pretending not to know), come to a pedestrian and talk as if friendly (speaking frankly), and as that person is letting their guard down, they'd show their true form (become open and unconcealed) and show their original appearance (a white monster, as if having applied white facial powder).

In the literature starting in the Shōwa and Heisei periods, it was written to be a yōkai that appears near abandoned temples, but this comes from the passage "on the eaves of old temples would appear the nuppepō, almost like a lump of trouble itself" from the book Yōkai Gadan Zenshū Nihonhen Jō (妖怪画談全集 日本篇 上) by the folklore scholar Morihiko Fujisawa, so it's been suggested that Fujisawa's statement of "appearing at temples" is nothing more than an original made-up creation imagined from the background in the Gazu Hyakki Yagyō. Also, some literature notes that it is a yōkai that is born as the changed form of dead meat, so when this yōkai passes through, it would leave the stench of rotten meat in its trail, but the original primary source for this is unknown.

== Similar tales ==
In the Bunka period writing Isshōwa (一宵話, "One Evening Story"), there is a story similar to the nuppepō.

In 1609 (Keichō 14), at the courtyard of Sunpu Castle, someone that looked like a blob of meat appeared. It had the form of a young child, and it had hands but no fingers, and it could even be called a nikujin (肉人; lit. "meat-person"). It was thought that someone like this who'd enter a high security castle would obviously be a yōkai, but when they tried to capture it, it moved so fast, it could not be captured. Tokugawa Ieyasu, who lived at Sunpu Castle at the time, ordered that person be driven out, so the servants gave up trying to capture it and instead just drove it from the castle into the mountains.

Someone who later heard this tale and was knowledgeable about pharmaceutics noted that this is the "Feng" (封) mentioned in old Chinese texts, and it was also written about in the Bái Zé Tú, and regretted a missed opportunity because eating its meat is a panacea that grants great power.

== Etymology ==
The name "nuppeppō" is a corruption of the derogatory slang nupperi (ぬっぺり), used to describe a woman who applies too much make-up. This is most likely a reference to the creature's saggy appearance, which is similar to the sagging of a face under heavy make-up.

== Description ==
The nuppeppō appears as a blob of flesh with a hint of a face in the folds of fat. Though largely amorphous, fingers, toes, and even rudimentary limbs may be attributed as features amidst the fold of skin. The origins of the nuppeppō are unknown. However, it is sometimes described as constructed of the flesh of dead humans in a manner similar to Frankenstein's monster.

=== Behaviors and powers ===
The nuppeppō is passive and almost entirely harmless, but it has a repulsive body odor is said to rival that smell of rotting flesh. Those who eat the flesh of a nuppeppō are described as being granted eternal youth.

The nuppeppō aimlessly wanders deserted streets of villages, towns and cities, often at night towards the year-end, or graveyards or abandoned temples. It is usually a solitary creature, but there have reportedly been sightings of them in groups. If encountered, the nuppeppō is unlikely to cause a human any harm. However, its lumbering stature and foul odor may cause shock and alarm.

== References in Japanese culture ==
Illustrations of the Nuppeppō can be found as early as 1737 Hyakkai Zukan by author Sawaki Suushi and the late seventeenth century Bakemono no e. Later illustrations can be found in the works of Toriyama Sekien, starting with his 1776 publication Gazu Hyakki Yagyō.

The 18th century scribe Makibokusen wrote a scroll describing the appearance of a creature matching the description of the nuppeppō at the castle of shōgun Tokugawa Ieyasu. According to the story, Tokugawa ordered that the creature be sent away to the mountains unharmed so that it could be kept safe and clear of human settlements. Tokugawa later learns that the creature is noted in Chinese literature as being a "sovereign specific", endowed with powers of restoration.

== See also ==
- Chinese mythology
- Japanese mythology
