= Noppera-bō =

Yokai

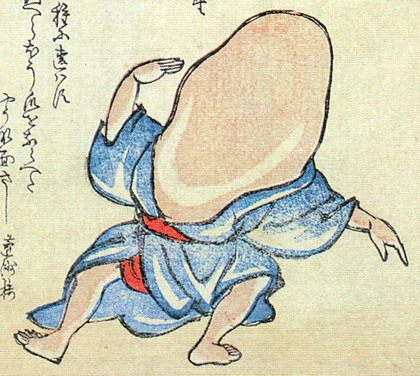
Nopperabō. —from Kyōka hyaku monogatari (1853), illustrated by Ryōsai Kanjin Masazumi (Note: Opposite page (fol. 8 verso) shows a variant humanoid type nozuchi, with a blank face but mouth atop its head.)

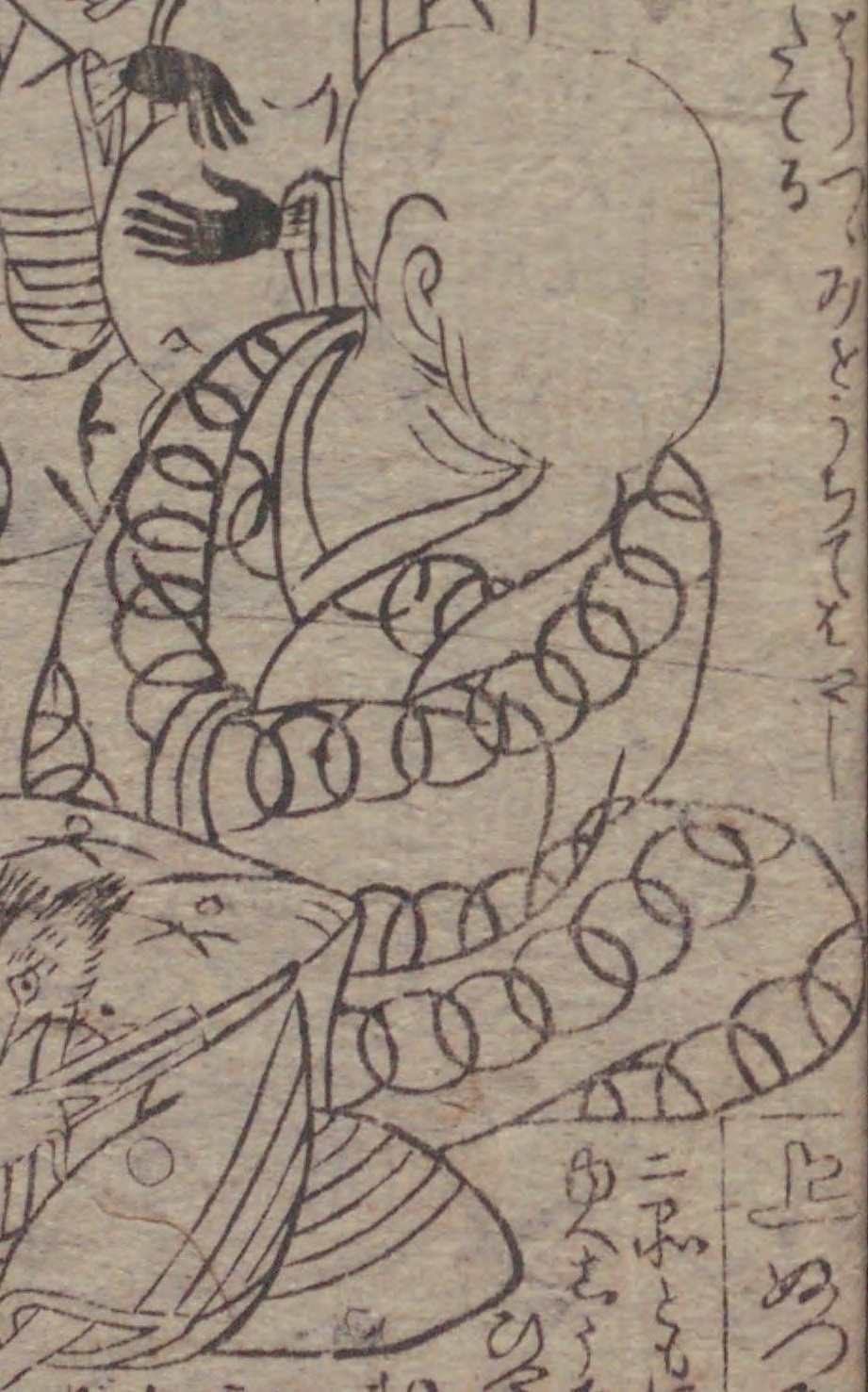
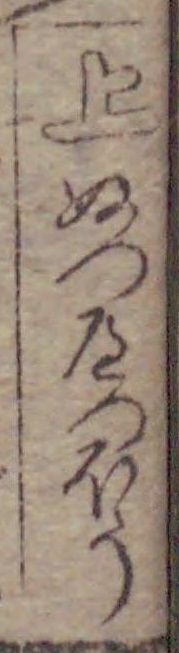
A noppera-bō (actually labeled nuppeppō (ぬつへつほう))
—from Bakemono Shiuchi Hyōbanki (妖怪仕内評判記; "Compilation of Monster Critiques", 1779) by Koikawa Harumachi. (Note: Opposite page features another faceless yōkai with an open mouth on top of the head, labeled nozuchi.)

The noppera-bō (のっぺらぼう/野箆坊; < nopperi "flat-faced"), in Japanese folklore, is a faceless yōkai that looks like a human but has no face.

An 18th-century version exists which calls the yōkai a nupperibō. Old versions may not name the yōkai explicitly as a nopperabō, and this also applies to Lafcadio Hearn's short story "Mujina" (1904), set in Edo (Tokyo). Here, a man witnesses a blank-faced noppera-bō woman, flees, and tries to tell his experience to a soba noodle shop proprietor, who also turns around with a blank face and asks if that was what the man saw.

This motif of double-scare has been dubbed saido no kai (再度の怪) (§ Recurrent spookings). Sometimes the blank-faced human is told or hinted to be a trick played by a shapeshifter beast such as the mujina, fox kitsune, or tanuki. Additional regional folktale examples have been printed also.

== Overview ==
In Lafcadio Hearn's story, the faceless being is not called a noppera-bō but a mujina, which usually refers to a badger or raccoon dog, ascribed an ability to shapeshift.

Noppera-bō are known primarily for frightening humans, but are usually otherwise harmless. (Note: Author Junya Kōno categorizes the similar creature nuppeppō as level 1, harmless, and nopperabō as level 2, eerie.) They appear at first as ordinary human beings, sometimes impersonating someone familiar to the victim, before causing their features to disappear, leaving a blank, smooth sheet of skin where their face should be.

As in Hearn's version, nopperabō tales often exhibit the motif of § Recurrent spookings (saido no kai (再度の怪)).

Often, a noppera-bō would not actually exist, but was the disguise of a mujina, a fox kitsune, or a tanuki, though it has been conjectured that this might be a case of folktale being contaminated by Hearn's literary publications.。

The yōkai nuppeppō bears a similar name and is probably related, though perhaps distinct since it is typically depicted as having a face on its huge head in lieu of any torso, from which the arms and legs stick out. Consequently, ukiyo-e artist and novelist Harumachi's woodblock illustration nuppeppō (fig. right) fails to fit this definition (cf. § Similar or sub-types).

== In literature and folktales ==
One tale that hints at some shapeshifting magic beast tricking humans into seeing faceless beings occurs in kaidan collection Shinsetsu Hyakumonogatari (Meiwa 4/1767). It records that the nupperibō (ぬっぺりほう) made spooky appearance in Nijōgawara, Kyoto (near Nijō-ōhashi bridge), and since the victims came away with thick hairs attached to their clothing, the events were blamed on the tricks of some furry beast.

However, sometimes their real identity is not known, and in the Kanbun 3 (1663) kaidan collection Sorori monogatari, it was written that in the Oike-chō of the capital (now Muromachi dōri Oike sagaru, Nakagyō-ku, Kyoto), there appeared a noppera-bō about 7 shaku (about 2.1 meters) in height, but nothing was written about what its true identity was.

They are also said to appear in folktales in the Osaka Prefecture and Kotonami, Nakatado District, Kagawa Prefecture among other places.

=== The Mujina of the Akasaka Road ===
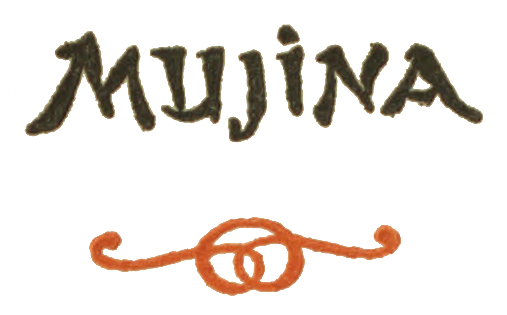
From Mujina (1904) by Lafcadio Hearn.

An iconic story about a noppera-bō (though this name does not appear in the story) is "Mujina" in Lafcadio Hearn's book Kwaidan (1904). The story tells of a man who, travelling along the Akasaka road to Edo, comes across a seemingly distressed and weeping young woman near Kii-no-Kunizaka (i.e., Kinokunizaka) hill, perhaps attempting suicide. He attempts to console her, when she turns around and drops the sleeve from her face, revealing she had "no eyes or nose or mouth". Frightened, he runs down and reaches a soba-noodle vendor. The man winds down and starts telling the vendor of his encounter, only to have the soba vendor turn around and ask if the lady's face was "anything like this?" stroking his egg-like smooth face, making him into a noppera-bō himself. Hearn's narrative does not clarify what the mujina is, merely stating it haunted the Kinokunizaka area, and was witnessed by the old merchant, but it could be inferred that this mujina was a shapeshifter that "transmogrified" into these humans to tease the old man, as has been commented.

Hearn's use of the name Mujina here is confusing, but an encounter with the noppera-bō is indeed often blamed on the trickery of the shapeshifting mujina, kitsune, or tanuki, in the folklore of many regions of Japan.

=== Aomori's zunberabō ===
In Sazanami Iwaya's anthology Daigoen (1935) is a story set in Hirosaki under the Tsugaru Domain (now in Aomori Prefecture), where the faceless yōkai was called zunberabō. A man named Yohei (與兵衛) who boasted of his singing voice took a mountain path towards home late in the day and encountered someone singing beautifully the same song as he. When Yohei approached and asked who he was, it turned out to be a faceless man who answered "Me!". Yohei sped back to the neighboring village whence he came, and awoke his acquaintance to recount his experience, when the listener turned around with a blank face and asked "Did the zunberabō look like this?"

=== Toki clan of Gifu ===
According to Sengoku period warlord Mori Nagayoshi (d. 1584)'s autobiographical Kaneyama-ki (兼山記), when Kukuri Castle's lord Toki Mikawa-no-kami (Kukuri Yorioki) was in his youth and went by the name Akutarō (悪五郎), he went into the wilderness to hunt and encountered a monstrous yamabushi about 1 jō (10 shaku, about 10 feet) tall. Akutarō wrestled him down, but the ascetic disappeared. He descended from the mountain and came to Chōhō-ji and began to tell about his encounter to the abbot, when the priest clapped his hand and asked, "was that phantasm something like this?" upon which fiends with white, eyeless and nose-less faces like white gourds began spawning endlessly, and finding himself unable to draw sword, had resigned himself to meeting his death, when a wind blew and the temple disappeared, and he found himself in an open field.

=== Jūbakobaba of Kumamoto ===
An anthology of Higo Province (Kumamoto Prefecture) folklore published in the Shōwa era (1940s) relates a story about the nopperapon [sic], as follows. A slope called Hoke-zaka (法華坂) in Kumamoto was where reputedly the Jūbakobaba ("lunchbox hag") appeared, which everyone feared without knowing what sort of monster it was. A traveler (seemingly a pilgrim of many temples) came to rest at a teahouse atop the slope, and asked the woman for some warm food. He asked whether the rumored creature really appeared, and she answered "yes it does come out", and "this is what a Jūbakobaba is like", (Note: 重箱婆ってこぎゃんとたい, in Kyushu dialect.) displaying her face without a nose, eyes, or a mouth. The traveler fled and reached a teahouse at the slope's bottom, and confessed to the woman there he'd just seen the dreaded hag, at which this woman repeated the same line as the first hag, and displayed her nopperapon face.

A variant of the tale also set in Higo Province refers to the faceless monster as nopperabon. (Note: Kimura, Yūshō 木村祐章 (1974). Higo mukashi-banashi shū 肥後昔話集《Zenkoku mukashi-banash shiryō shūsei 全国昔話資料集成 6》, Iwasaki Bijutsu-sha, p. 90 apud Foster (with short summary))

=== Ochobo of Hyōgo ===
A horror story from old Sasayama (now Tamba-Sasayama, Hyōgo) speaks of Dote-ura no Ochobo (土手裏のおちょぼ), that is, a bob-haired girl named "Ochobo behind the dyke". When one takes the narrow path through the bushes (where Behind-the-Dyke is located) at night, and happens to call on the girl, she will turn around and display her zunberabō (ヅンベラボウ) face without eyes or nose. (Note: ochobo could mean "small mouth" but the source does not clarify this.)

== Origin theories ==
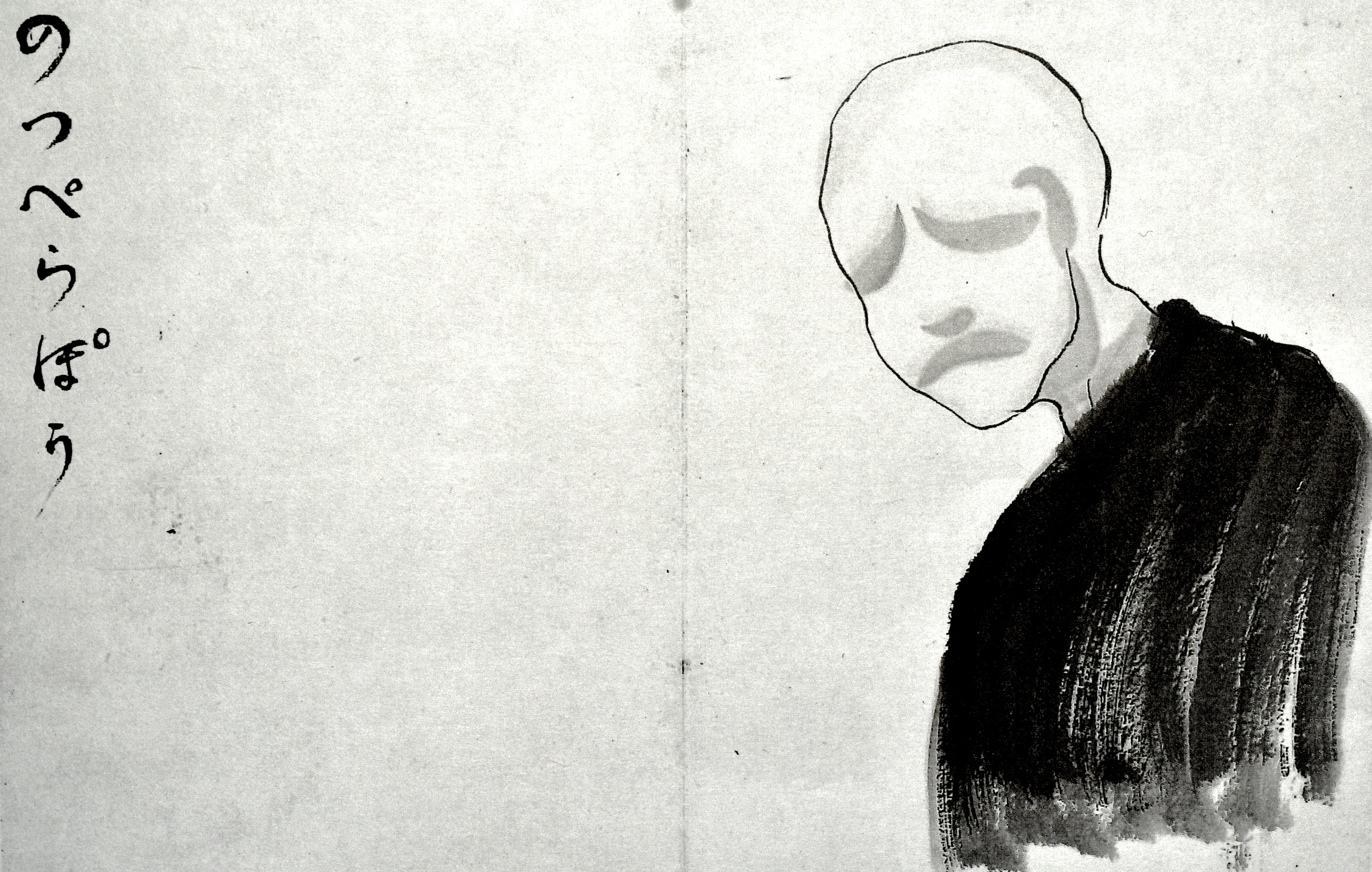
Nopperabō —By Ryūnosuke Akutagawa (d. 1927), ink drawings in Bakemonochō, first viewed publicly 1977.

=== Chinese parallels ===
Qing dynasty writer Ji Yun's Notes of the Thatched Abode of Close Observations was written in five parts, and Part 2, entitled So Have I Heard (如是我聞, 1791) contains a story that happened at the old residence of Cuizhuang, where a slave named Zhang Yunhui (張雲會) while fetching tea utensils for his master saw a young girl with long hair hidden in the tree shade. Thinking he caught a maidservant (slacking off) he grabbed her, when she showed her face, which was completely white without ears, eyes, mouth, or nose. Tattle talks ensued, and some said such things have been heard of, others suggested that the girl cleverly shrouded her face with a piece of fabric. (Note: Ji Yun. Yuewei caotan biji(閱微草堂筆記, "Notes of the Thatched Abode of Close Observations", e-text extract by Yabu-tyan.)

Yetan suilu (夜譚随録, "Jottings of nighttime talks", late 18th cent.) (Note: By Hebang'e 和邦額.) contains the episode of the "Lady in scarlet garment". (Note: 紅衣婦人.) There were guards drinking on night duty (Note: 値宿 equivalent to 宿直.) inside Xishiku, (Note: 西十庫.) at the Xian'an men west gate of the Imperial City, Beijing. One of them went off to urinate, and saw a woman in a scarlet dress crouching. When the man embraced her from behind, she revealed a face white as tofu and vague-looking. (Note: Yetan suilu: "無眉目口鼻但見白面糢糊如豆腐然".)

=== Recurrent spookings ===
External image
- Nopperabō bronze installed along Mizuki Shigeru Road

The motif of "recurrent spooking" in ghost stories has been dubbed saido no kai (再度の怪) and Lafcadio Hearn's Mujina story version of nopperabō (or a close cognate tale thereof (Note: Shibata's discussion on "recurrent spooking" brings up as example a nopperabō tale whose protagonist is identified as one Sakuma Sagoemon (佐久間左五右衛門) of the kojūnin-gumi (10-men squad of escort guards), rather than the old merchant, who has an encounter with an eerie woman followed by the faceless soba vendor.)) has been pointed out as an example exhibiting this double scare. Ghost stories featuring the yōkai known as Shu no bon (lit. "vermillion tray") also exhibit the "recurrent spooking" motif.

It has been proposed that at the root of all "recurrent spooking" ghost stories lies the examples in Chinese classical literature, namely the Soushenji. (Note: There are two tales that apply, collectively called by the tentative name yomichi no kai (夜道の怪; "spooks of the nocturnal journey") in Japanese sources.) There are two narratives that apply. One involving a boy and old man as passengers both carrying pipa lutes, whose faces turn ferocious, The other tale involves rabbit-like specters. (Note: These tales go by various titles such as Tale 389 Gu pipa 鼓琵琶 and Tale 406 Dunqui guimei 頓丘鬼魅 and occur in Volume 17 of the work.)

Minakata Kumagusu gave opinion that since the old narrative attested in the 16th century Kaneyama-ki (§ Toki clan of Gifu) already uses the expression "face like a white gourd, without nose or eyes", Hearn's phraseology "face―which therewith became like unto an Egg" was probably just a rehash.

Hearn scholar Masaru Tōda argues that it was probably improvisation on Hearn's part to transpose the "recurrent spooking" motif to the nopperabō tale. He argues that traditionally the motif had only been used with other monsters, like the oni or ogre types. (Note: The 18th century work Rōō sawa (老媼茶話) contains the Shu no bon type story with the recurring spooking, but the fright is caused by ogre-hags.) Although there are regional nopperabō tales with the double-spooking motif, Tōda notes they have been collected or published after Hearn, and cannot reliably be dated to the remote past, as some folklorists have been prone to doing. For example, the tale published by Iwaya (1935) above（§ Aomori's zunberabō contains the expression "like an egg", which suggests a vestige of someone who heard Hearn's tale. The tale published 1944 (§ Jūbakobaba of Kumamoto) had excited interest in some scholars in the past as possibly being Hearn's source, since the writer had spent time in the Kumamoto area, but Tōda is skeptical about backdating this tale specimen.

As for the tale attested centuries before Hearn (§ Toki clan of Gifu) it could have easily been created independently of Hearn, based on pieces of the older (Azuchi–Momoyama period or earlier) tales preserved in Sorori monogatari.

== Similar or sub-types ==
Though the nuppeppō is probably somehow related to the nopperabō, the typical nuppeppō has distinctively different features (as illustrated in Hyakkai zukan, Bakemono zukushi, Hyakki yagyō emaki, and Bakemono no e (Note: Foster here instead of Bakemono no egives Bakemono emaki, however 化もの絵巻 at the Tokushima Prefectural Museum)), being a sort of blobby-bodied being with sagging folds of flesh forming eyes, nose, and mouth on a giant face-head it carries instead of a torso, and thus it might be distinguished from the faceless nopperabō according to Foster (2015). However, it may just be that the nuppeppō wrinkled folds of skin merely simulates a face, and it does not actually have any eyes, nose, or mouth.

A shirobōzu is a subtype of a nuppeppō said to be a shapeshift of a kitsune fox according to some sources, but in the Izumi area of Osaka Prefecture, an elderly informant insisted the shirobōzu was the doing of the tanuki racoon dog and not a fox, this area being the renowned for the lore of the Shinoda vixen. As there is a shirobōzu ("white priest/baldie/boy") there is also a yōkai called kuroobōzu ("black priest") whose only facial feature is a mouth. Both the shirobōzu and kurobōzu are categorized as types of nopperabō in Shigeru Mizuki's essay.

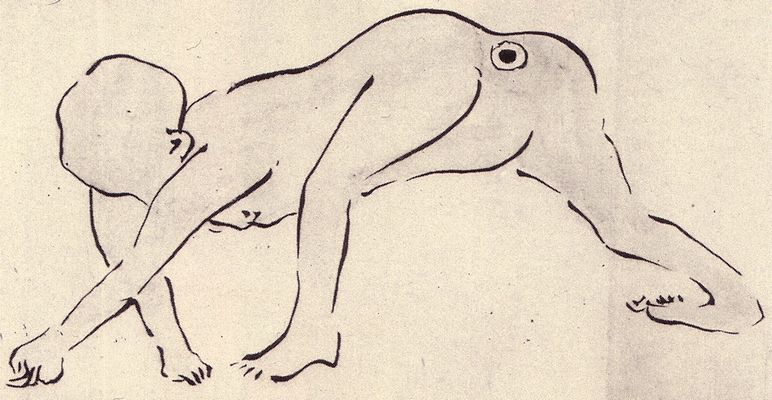
Nuppori-bōzu. — Yosa Buson's Buson yōkai emaki (c. 1754–1757)

The nupperibōzu in Yosa Buson's Buson yōkai emaki (c. 1754–1757) allegedly appeared in the Katabira-suji ("Chainmail alley") area of Kyoto City. Kōichi Yumoto considered it to be just a nopperabō after all. But the nupperibōzu is shown with the distinctive trait of an eyeball in the anus, glowing like lightning. This has prompted Mizuki to give it the name shirime (尻目; "butt-eye"). His embellished cartoon depicts his shirime as stripping naked while carrying its clothes in order to spook a samurai.

There is also the meoni (lit. "woman ogre") from the 11th century novel Genji monogatari, Book 53, Tenarai which describes it as an eye-less, nose-less being from long ago.

Yanagita Kunio's Tōno monogatari shūi ("supplement", 1935), Story #11, tells the legendary history of the Komagata-jinja shrine in the former Ayano village (now Ayaori-chō in Tōno city). According to locals, the shrine was founded after a certain traveler came by long ago, piggybacking a flat-faced child with no eyes nor nose, wearing a red hood on its head, (Note: Japanese: "旅人が目鼻もないのっぺりとした子供に赤頭巾をかぶせたのを背中におぶって通りかかった".) and rested on the spot, or had died there.

Ohaguro bettarii has been classed as a subtype of nopperabō, as this female yōkai is a "nopperabō with a grinning mouth", displaying her namesake blackened teeth (ohaguro) but having neither eyes nor nose.

== See also ==
- Faceless (disambiguation)
- Kiyomi Haunterly, a Japanese faceless ghost in Monster High
- Kuchisake-onna ("Slit Mouth Woman"), a Japanese urban legend about a disfigured woman
- Spirited Away, a 2001 Japanese animated film featuring a character known as "NoFace"
