= Rokurokubi (folktale) =

Rokurokubi (ろくろ首) is a tale from Lafcadio Hearn’s Kwaidan. It features a monster by the same name (actually a classification error took place; in reality it features a nukekubi, not a rokurokubi). It features a protagonist who exemplifies the values of the time and age. His name is Isogai Heidazaemon Taketsura and was a vassal in the service of the feudal lord Kikuji. When Isogai’s master was defeated, instead of finding another master to serve, he became an itinerant priest and assumed the name Kwairyō.

== Setting ==
It takes place, “nearly five hundred years ago”. Considering Kwaidan was first published in 1904, the story is most likely from the Muromachi Period in Japanese history (c.1336-1573). The protagonist is said in the tale to have served well in the Eikyō War, which took place in 1438, during the Muromachi period. At that time in Japan, regional warfare was rampant and feudal lords were constantly being uprooted, defeated, and having their houses thrown into disarray.

== Synopsis ==
Kwairyō finds himself traveling through the hills in a province called Kai when he realizes that he is far from any hamlet or village. Having resigned himself to sleeping outside (something which does not bother our stalwart hero in the least), he is warned of “Hairy Things” and offered a place to pass the night by a woodcutter. Kwairyō accepts the offer and follows the woodcutter to his warmly lit cottage. Kwairyō meets the other four members of the household and has a brief conversation with the woodcutter who admits that he used to be a warrior of rank but through his selfishness, he brought about the ruin of his house. Kwairyō offers to recite some Buddhist sutras for him then retires to his room. Sleep eludes him and he is getting a drink when he finds five bodies on the floor, without heads. He assumes they are rokurokubi, but they are more likely nukekubi (Hearn's mistake or Kwairyō's, we don't know for sure). A rokurokubi's head does not detach from the body but merely travels far from it on the end of an infinitely extendable neck. These were most likely nukekubi since their heads were completely detached from their bodies. Also, in Japanese, nuku (抜く), while having several meanings, means to detach or unplug while the word rokuro refers to a pulley as well as a potter's wheel. We can infer that these were indeed nukekubi. Whatever the case, Kwairyō moves the body of the woodcutter from its original position in order to prevent the head from finding its body ever again (an inherent weakness of the nukekubi) then finds the heads bobbing around outside discussing how best to go about eating him. Kwairyō, with a small element of surprise, manages to beat away four of them who later flee while the last one, the head of the woodcutter, bites onto the sleeve of his koromo (a garment worn by Buddhist priests) and remains clamped there even after death, impossible to remove. Kwairyō travels to a near village called Suwa and after being questioned by authorities about the severed head attached to his clothing, he explains about the night's events. A wise magistrate recognizes the character on the back of the neck, which signifies that it was indeed a nukekubi and not a murder victim. He is released and encounters a thief on the highway who after some discussion acquires the koromo from Kwairyō to play himself off as a hardened thug. He learns of the actual events of the night and brings the head back to the woodcutter's cabin and buries it.
