= Mujina =

Badger in Japanese folklore

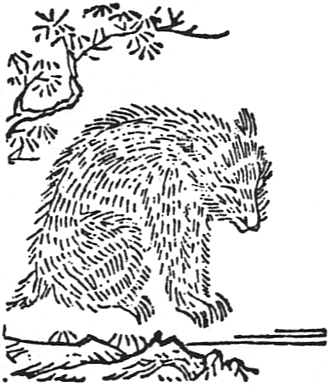
Depiction of a mujina (from the Wakan Sansai Zue, Edo period)

Mujina (Japanese: 貉) is an old Japanese term primarily referring to the Japanese badger, but traditionally to the Japanese raccoon dog (tanuki), causing confusion. Adding to the confusion, it may also refer to the introduced masked palm civet, and in some regions badger-like animals or Japanese raccoon dog are also called mami.

== Appearance ==
The mujina is said to be a raccoon-faced creature in its natural form, with the main body being that of a Japanese badger. In some parts of Japan, they are incorrectly referred to as the tanuki, to whom they are closely related in terms of appearance as well as actions- even though the tanuki are biologically related to the fox and dog. The mujina in specific are known to be able to inflate their bellies, creating music by drumming on it whilst singing. Some tales also describe the badger inflating their scrotum to cover "eight mats", referring to the size of a room. At times, the mujina will also create a "ghost-fire", also called tanuki-bi (狸火), which resembles will-o'-the-wisps. According to the beliefs of the Osaka-Kishû district, these fire-emitting badgers are normally found on rainy nights.

In transformation, it is said that the possibilities of what the mujina could turn into were endless. Sometimes, they are seen as a one-eyed hag, and sometimes a tax-collecting government official. Normally, these creatures take a female model in order to seduce its victims, most of whom are men. One of its favorite appearances is that of a black-garbed Buddhist priest, also called the tanuki-bôzu. When in this form, the mujina normally inhabits the underneath of a Buddhist temple, as well as carry an upside-down lotus leaf on its head. Of course, these badgers weren't limited to purely human forms- they have been able to transform into dazzling comets, fence posts, stones, trees, and so on.

Because the mujina is a supernatural creature, its transformations will also seem supernatural. It is believed that a "true hero" will always be able to tell apart the mujina from other humans, while a gullible man suffers the consequences of his naivety. The most obvious characteristic of a shapeshifted mujina is the slight luminescence that they will give off, like the kitsune. Another way to tell them apart is to look for dry outerwear while out in the rain. However, the latter method is situational, and therefore not always applicable. The appearance of a mujina's transformation isn't always stable; if the badger were to drift to sleep, their appearance can become wholly or even partially undone.

== Traits ==
Like the other yōkai, the mujina is a notorious trickster, and enjoys using their shapeshifting to play harmless pranks. One of the reasons behind this is to limit test their capabilities as a shapeshifter, and ability to imitate mannerisms. In the story "The Badger's Trick", a man stops at a lone hut during a trip, only to find out that it was a shapeshifting mujina who had disguised itself as a house. However, there are also numerous stories where the badger itself is sometimes even fatally, outwitted.

It is believed that although these creatures can be extremely chaotic, they have a gentle heart, and know how to be grateful. One story speaks of a Mr. Kitabayashi and his family, who feed a family of badgers for some time. Later, when a couple burglars break into their home, threatening Kibayashi, the adult badgers of the family come back in the form of gigantic wrestlers, to scare off the intruders and repay the Kitabayashi family for their generosity.

In general, it is extremely difficult to make the mujina angry, but if you ever do, then they can cause great tragedy. These fits of anger are often related to their living space, such as the destroying of their den or an attack on their families. Actions of the mujina can range from mere luring of the target to a location and disorienting them with constant shapeshifting, to baiting the victim into being killed. There will never, however, be a time when the mujina act viciously without reason.

== In law ==
The confusion over the term mujina has led to legal consequences in Japan. In Tochigi Prefecture in 1924, a hunter killed a raccoon dog, which he believed to be called a mujina. He believed badgers were a protected species as they were called tanuki in Tochigi Prefecture. However, the law banning the hunting of tanuki was referring to such raccoon dogs, as a raccoon dog is called tanuki in Tokyo. The Japanese Supreme Court ruled the hunter was legitimately confused (although the reason that he was judged not guilty was on the interpretation of "date of hunt", not the word confusion).

== In folklore ==
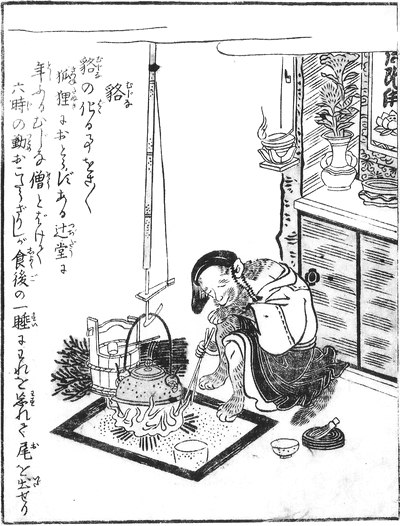
"Mujina" from the Konjaku Gazu Zoku Hyakki by Sekien Toriyama

In Japanese folklore, like the kitsune (fox) and the tanuki (typically a Japanese raccoon dog), mujina (which could be raccoon dog or badger) are frequently depicted as yōkai that shapeshift and deceive humans. They are first seen in literature in the Nihon Shoki in the part about Empress Suiko's 35th year (627), where it states, "[I]n two months of spring, there are mujina in the country of Mutsu (春2月、陸奥国に狢有り), they turn into humans and sing songs (人となりて歌う)" demonstrating that, in that era, there was the general idea that mujina shapeshift and deceive humans. In the Shimōsa region, they are called kabukiri-kozō (かぶきり小僧), and they would shapeshift into a kozō (little monk) wearing a strangely short kimono with a kappa-like bobbed head, and frequently appear on roads at night without many people and say, "Drink water, drink tea (水飲め、茶を飲め)." The story in Lafcadio Hearn's kaidan collections called "Mujina" about the witnessing of a faceless ghost (a noppera-bō) is also well-known.

=== The faceless ghost from Kwaidan ===
On May 19, 1959, Honolulu Advertiser reporter Bob Krauss reported a sighting of a mujina at the Waialae Drive-In Theatre in Kahala. Krauss reported the witness watched a woman combing her hair in the women's restroom, and when the witness came close enough, the mujina turned, revealing her featureless face.

The witness was reported to have been admitted to the hospital for a nervous breakdown. Noted Hawaiian historian, folklorist, and author Glen Grant, in a 1981 radio interview, dismissed the story as rumor, only to be called by the witness herself, who gave more details on the event, including the previously unreported detail that the mujina in question had red hair. The drive-in no longer exists, having been torn down to make room for Public Storage.

Grant has also reported on a number of other mujina sightings in Hawaii, from ‘Ewa Beach to Hilo.

== Other uses ==
The term can also refer to the following:

- "Mujina", a short story relating to the above legends, found in Lafcadio Hearn's book Kwaidan: Stories and Studies of Strange Things.
- Mujina-no-yu is an onsen facility in Nasu, Tochigi, Japan.

== See also ==
- Bake-danuki
- Folklore in Hawaii
- Japanese mythology
