= Beyond the Horizon (novel) =

1995 novel by Amma Darko

- Author: Amma Darko
- Original title: Der verkaufte Traum
- Language: English
- Subject: Feminism
- Genre: Literary fiction
- Set in: Ghana
- Publisher: Schmetterling-Verl, Heinemann
- Publication date: 1991
- Publication place: Ghana
- English publication date: 1 March 1995
- Media type: Print (paperback)
- Pages: 140
- ISBN: 0-435-90990-8 (first edition)
- OCLC: 32140941

Beyond the Horizon is the debut novel by Ghanaian author Amma Darko. The English version was first released on 1 March 1995.
