= Faceless (2016 film) =

- Directed by: Ali Akbar Kamal
- Written by: Ali Akbar Kamal
- Produced by: Christopher Inkoom Irfan Shams Khan Mariah MacDonald Mehran Shojaei Humayoon Sakhi
- Starring: Humayoon Shams Khan Rahmatullah Khostai Farahnaz Nawabi
- Cinematography: Ali Akbar Kamal
- Edited by: Ali Akbar Kamal
- Production companies: Joint Task Force Films; Makama Films; Shams Media Production
- Release date: December 2, 2016 (Toronto premiere)
- Running time: 90 minutes
- Countries: Afghanistan; Canada
- Language: Persian

Faceless is a 2016 Canadian-Afghan Persian-language action film.

== Plot ==
In 2015 Afghanistan, an aimless young man named Sameer does his best to take care of his younger brother, Nasir, as their parents are dead. Sameer has dyslexia and practices Asian martial arts with limited success. His neighborhood is controlled by gangsters led by Zabeer who want him and Nasir to sell drugs. Sameer longs to end the victimisation of ordinary people like himself at the hand of criminals protected by the state, but feels powerless. After hearing a mystical call, Sameer finds a necklace wrapped around the neck of a skeleton in the ruins of an old palace.

Sameer starts to wear the necklace. While picking up Nasir at his school, a suicide bomber arrives and Sameer discovers the necklace allows him to magically slow down time. Taking advantage of this power, he uses his martial art skills to kill the would-be bomber. Empowered by the necklace, Sameer dons a mask and works as a vigilante, killing the criminals of Afghanistan and becomes known to the public as the "Faceless Hero". Sameer finds Nasir is selling drugs for Zabeer and sends him away to his martial arts teacher, Coach Ahmadi. Ahmadi tells Sameer that it was his destiny to find the magical necklace and be a hero.

While the corrupt policeman Ali seeks to hunt him down, Sameer befriends a sympathetic newswoman, Nilofar, telling her that the Afghan state is so systematically corrupt that vigilantism is justified. When Sameer kills Zabeer, one of his men survives and tells Ali who the "Faceless Hero" is. Sameer rescues a 13-year-old girl, Maria, who ran away from an arranged marriage, causing her jilted would-be husband to falsely accuse her of burning the Koran. Sameer battles an enraged mob seeking to lynch Maria. After saving Maria, Sameer's house is attacked by Ali and his men. Sameer triumphs despite temporarily losing his magical necklace. After defeating Ali, Sameer spares his life, hoping that the state will bring him to justice for his crimes. Instead Ali is freed by his fellow policemen, but he is executed for his failure by his paymasters. Sameer resolves to continue his vigilante work until Afghanistan is cleansed of crime and corruption.

== Cast ==
- Humayoon Shams Khan-Sameer
- Rahmatullah Khostai-Ali
- Farahnaz Nawabi-Maria
- Abrar Shams Khan-Nasir
- Farzana Nawabi-Nilofar
- Nasima Nawabi-Maria's mother
- Shahwali Nawabi-Maria's father
- Asad Tajzal-Rahman

== Production ==
The film was scripted and directed by Ali Akbar Kamal, an Afghan-Canadian filmmaker who disliked the way his homeland was portrayed in the West and decided to make a film that told a story from an Afghan viewpoint. Kamal, a graduate of the Toronto Film School, decided to make the first Afghan superhero film as a way of rebutting Western stereotypes about Afghanistan. The film was shot on location in Kabul in June–July 2016.

== Reception ==
Through mostly ignored in the West, the film was described as a "great success" in Afghanistan.
