= Faceless (2025 film) =

Film by Fraser Pemberton and William Jaka

- Directed by: Fraser Pemberton; William Jaka
- Written by: Fraser Pemberton; William Jaka; Chris C.F.
- Produced by: Chris C.F.; Theo McMahon
- Starring: William Jaka; Stephen Hutchison; Lucille Bone; Aaron James Campbell
- Cinematography: Alexandra Walton
- Edited by: Chris C.F.
- Music by: Josh Peters
- Production company: Dogmilk Films
- Release date: 14 June 2025; (Sydney Film Festival)
- Running time: 28 minutes
- Country: Australia
- Language: English

Faceless is a 2025 Australian short psychological drama film marking the first collaboration between co-directors Fraser Pemberton and William Jaka as a directing duo, who also co-wrote the film together with Chris C.F. Produced by the Naarm/Melbourne-based collective Dogmilk Films, the film follows an Indigenous man moving through three parallel realities — as a rough sleeper, an aspiring actor, and a mining company employee — on the banks of the Birrarung-Ga (the Yarra River) in Naarm.

Faceless had its world premiere at the 2025 Sydney Film Festival, where it won the Dendy Award for Best Live Action Short Film and the AFTRS Craft Award for Best Practitioner (for Josh Peters' music and sound design). It went on to screen at the Melbourne International Film Festival, where Pemberton and Jaka received the Award for Emerging Australian Filmmaker, and Jaka was separately nominated for the Uncle Jack Charles Award. The film subsequently had its international premiere in the International Competition of the Tampere Film Festival in Finland — the only Australian film selected for that year's competition — and screened at the Adelaide Film Festival, Flickerfest (where it had its New South Wales premiere), the St Kilda Film Festival, and the ReelGood Film Festival.

== Synopsis ==
An Indigenous man (played by William Jaka) navigates three parallel lives along the Birrarung-Ga: as a rough sleeper who encounters a homeless war veteran; as an aspiring actor moving through the Naarm art world; and as an employee entangled with a mining corporation. Each strand explores whether the character will always be made to feel like an outsider in his own land, and interrogates ideas of class, perception, and belonging in contemporary Australia.

== Cast ==
- William Jaka
- Stephen Hutchison
- Lucille Bone
- Aaron James Campbell

== Production ==
Faceless was developed within Dogmilk Films, a Naarm/Melbourne-based filmmaking and screening collective founded in 2017. William Jaka joined Dogmilk in late 2022, and the project began as a co-writing collaboration between Jaka, Fraser Pemberton, and Jaka's brother, producer and editor Chris C.F., with Pemberton and Jaka co-directing together for the first time. According to the filmmakers, the project was substantially reframed following the "No" result of the 2023 Indigenous Voice to Parliament referendum, which shaped the final film's exploration of Australian identity and belonging.

The film was financed through a VCA50 Creative Development Grant and a subsequent Australian Cultural Fund crowdfunding campaign, and involved contributions from all fourteen members of the Dogmilk collective across departments including camera, sound, costume, and casting. Cinematographer Alexandra Walton, previously known for documentary work, made her narrative filmmaking debut on the project. The 28-minute runtime was a deliberate creative decision by the filmmakers, made in spite of concerns that the film's length might limit its eligibility for some short film festivals.

== Release ==
Faceless had its world premiere at the 2025 Sydney Film Festival on 14 June 2025, screening as part of the festival's Dendy Awards program for Australian short films. It subsequently screened in the Accelerator Shorts program at the 2025 Melbourne International Film Festival on 13 and 23 August 2025, and in the Australian Shorts program at the 2025 Adelaide Film Festival.

The film had its international premiere in the International Competition of the 2026 Tampere Film Festival in Finland, where it was the only Australian film selected for the competition. It also screened in the First Nations Spotlight Shorts program at Flickerfest 2026 (its New South Wales premiere), in the Australian Voices strand of the First Peoples Program at the 2026 St Kilda Film Festival, and as a finalist selection at the 2026 ReelGood Film Festival.

== Critical reception ==
Faceless received positive responses from festival juries. In awarding the film the Dendy Award for Best Live Action Short Film at the 2025 Sydney Film Festival, the jury said: "For its narrative fearlessness, strong point of view, and water to sky motifs, Faceless confronts the white, urban spaces of contemporary Australia." The same festival's jury for the AFTRS Craft Award, presented to Josh Peters for the film's music and sound design, described his work as "the invisible glue that brings all the elements together; deliberate and nuanced and expertly crafted, becoming the spine of a truly cinematic experience."

At the 2025 Melbourne International Film Festival, the jury for the Award for Emerging Australian Filmmaker called Faceless "a taut, thought-provoking exploration of belonging and assimilation," adding that Jaka's "captivating onscreen portrayal of an Indigenous man journeying through parallel lives invites us to consider notions of class, perception and belonging."

== Accolades ==
Year	Award / Festival	Category	Recipient(s)	Result	Ref.
2025	Sydney Film Festival (Dendy Awards)	Best Live Action Short Film	Faceless (Fraser Pemberton, William Jaka)	Won	
2025	Sydney Film Festival (Dendy Awards)	AFTRS Craft Award for Best Practitioner	Josh Peters (Music & Sound Design)	Won	
2025	Melbourne International Film Festival (MIFF Shorts Awards)	Award for Emerging Australian Filmmaker	Fraser Pemberton and William Jaka	Won	
2025	Melbourne International Film Festival	Uncle Jack Charles Award	William Jaka	Nominated	
2026	St Kilda Film Festival	Best Achievement in Indigenous Filmmaking	Faceless	Nominated	
2026	ReelGood Film Festival	Best Film / Best On-Screen Talent (William Jaka)	Faceless	Nominated	
