= Faceless (novel) =

2003 novel by Amma Darko

- Author: Amma Darko
- Language: English
- Genre: Literary fiction
- Publication date: 2003
- Publication place: Ghana
- Media type: Print (Paperback)
- Pages: 236
- ISBN: 9789988550509
- OCLC: 53250489

Faceless is a 2003 novel by Ghanaian writer Amma Darko. The novel highlights the abuse of the girl-child in Africa. The novel received critical reviews and has been read by people with inquisitive dispositions and others.

== Plot summary ==
The novel is set in Sodom and Gomorah, a suburban ghetto town in Ghana. It primarily follows the story of Fofo, a 14-year-old street girl, and the investigation into the mysterious circumstances surrounding her sister Baby T's death. Baby T was a victim of abuse by their neighbor, Onko, and was involved in child prostitution, a situation addressed by the NGO known as MUTE.

== Theme ==
The novel predominantly focuses on child abuse and received by both women and the girl-child in Africa.
