= Rokurokubi =

Japanese yōkai with elongating neck

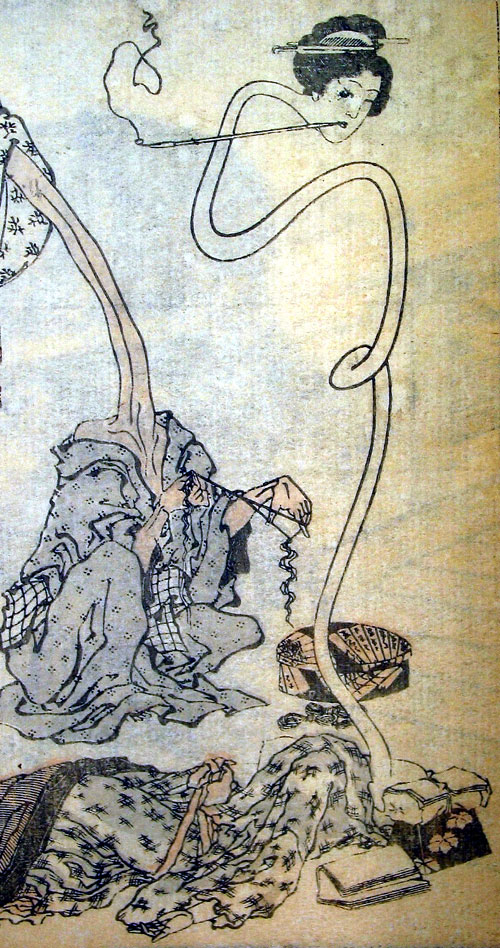
Rokurokubi from the Hokusai Manga by Katsushika Hokusai

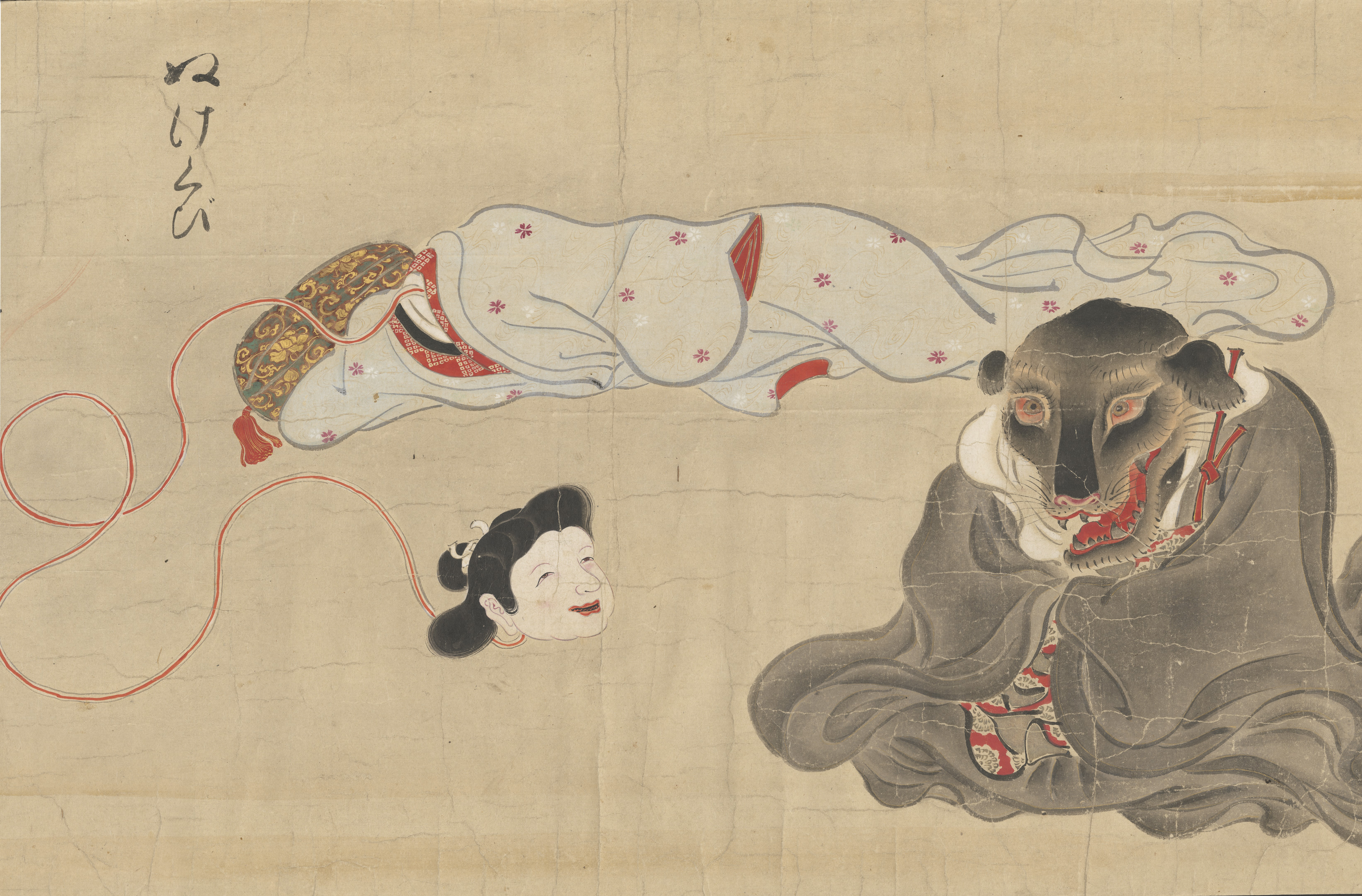
Nukekubi, from Bakemono no e scroll, Brigham Young University.

Rokurokubi (ろくろ首, 轆轤首) is a type of Japanese yōkai (apparition). They look almost completely like humans with some differences. There is a type whose neck stretches and another whose head detaches and flies around freely (nukekubi). The Rokurokubi appear in classical kaidan (spirit tales) and in yōkai works.

== Etymology ==
The word rokurokubi may have derived from the word rokuro which refers to a potter's wheel, a water well's pulley (since it elongates) or an umbrella handle (which also elongates).

== Head flight ==
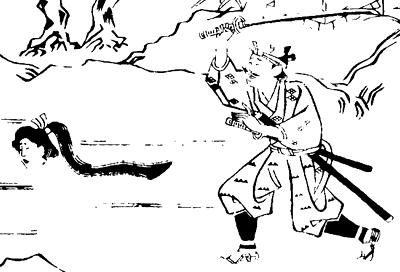
Onna no Mōnen Mayoiaruku Koto (女の妄念迷ひ歩く事) from the Sorori Monogatari (曾呂利物語)

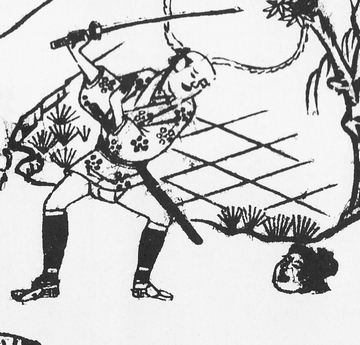
Wechizen no Kofuchuu Rokurokubi no Koto (ゑちぜんの国府中ろくろ首の事) from the Shokoku Hyaku Monogatari (諸国百物語)

The nukekubi are rokurokubi whose heads come off and float about. These were the last of the rokurokubi whereas the other kind came before. Nukekubi sometimes perform bad deeds such as attacking at night and drinking their victims' blood. It is theorized that the nukekubi has a weakness when it is sleeping and the head is floating around: if the body moves, then the head cannot be re-united to the body. Classical literature about rokurokubi describe tales of people witnessing and encountering floating heads at night time.

Sometimes, the action of the head separating from the body is seen as the soul wandering away from the body, i.e. somnambulism. For example, in the Sorori Monogatari (曾呂利物語, 1663 CE), in the chapter A Woman's Wild Thoughts Wandering Around (女の妄念迷ひ歩く事, Onna no Mōnen Mayoiaruku Koto) the head separating from the body interpreted to be the woman's soul wandering while asleep. In the same book, a man saw a nukekubi that changed into a chick and a woman's head, so he took his sword and chased the head. The head fled into a home and people said that they heard a voice from inside say, "I had a scary dream. I was chased by a man with a sword. I ran away all the way back home and then I woke up." (refer to picture).

A different story appears in Shokoku Hyaku Monogatari (諸国百物語, 1677 CE) which drew a lot of inspiration from the Sorori Monogatari. In About Rokurokubi in the Province of Echizen (ゑちぜんの国府中ろくろ首の事, Echizen no Kuni Fuchū Rokurokubi no Koto), there is a story of a man who chases a nukekubi (who was a woman's soul detached from her body) all the way home. The man who had pursued her realizes that she was human and remarks upon the extent of her sinful karma, describing it as ”あさましけれ” (dreadful, shameful, deplorable). The women who is astonished then asks her husband for release from their marriage, goes to Kyoto, shaves her head, establishes a hermitage in a place of repentance, and seeks spiritual enlightenment.

Hokusō Sadan (北窻瑣談, 1910 CE) is an Edo period essay by Tachibana Nankei (橘春暉). Here too, it was interpreted to be an illness resulting in a detaching soul. The story goes: in the first year of Kansei, in Echigo Province (now Fukui Prefecture), there was a house maidservant whose head rolled off the pillow while she was asleep, detached from the body. Later in the story, it was explained that it was not really the head, but rather the soul making the appearance of a head.

In Kokon Hyaku Monogatari Hyōban (古今百物語評判, 1686 CE), a book of ghost stories that explains yōkai tales by Yamaoka Genrin, there is a chapter called How Priest Zetsugan saw Rokurokubi in Higo (絶岸和尚肥後にて轆轤首を見給ふ事, Zetsugan Oshō Higo nite Rokurokubi wo Mitamou Koto). In Higo Province (now Kumamoto Prefecture), the head of an innkeeper's wife leaves her body and floats in the air. It returned to normal the next day, but there was a line around her neck. The author made references to examples from Chinese books and then commented "as these kinds of things were often seen in South-East Asia, not just limited to the creation of the heaven and earth, it is difficult to fathom them with ordinary common sense such as the idea that octopuses do not have eyes and as these things are unheard of in the capital, everything strange is in faraway lands." In the same book, there is a story which tells of a woman in the village of Tawa, Nagao, Ōkawa District, Kagawa Prefecture (now Sanuki) who is a rokurokubi and has a ring-like bruise around her neck.

In the Churyō Manroku (中陵漫録) is a tale which describes a "Rokurokubi Village" in the recesses of Mount Yoshino where all the residents, even children, wore scarves to cover a line around their necks.

In the Kasshi Yawa (甲子夜話, c. 1821 CE) by Matsura Seizan is a story which tells of a woman in Hitachi Province who has a terminal illness. A peddler has told her husband that the liver of a white dog will cure her. The husband kills the pet dog and gives his wife the dog's liver as a medicant. The woman is cured but her next-born daughter is a rokurokobi. When the rokurokubi's head detached and flew in the air, the white dog appeared, bit the head and killed the rokurokobi.

Although rokurokubi and nukekubi are usually female, in Shousai Hikki (蕉斎筆記), an Edo period tale, there is a nukekubi that is male. A priest is sleeping in his temple when a head appeared and approached his chest. He grabs it and throws it away and it left. In the morning, the manservant asks to take leave and when asked why, the manservant asks, "did a head come visit last night?" The priest answered yes, the manservant then explained that "I have the nukekubi illness and I fear it will interfere with my work too much from now on." The manservant went away to his home in Shimōsa Province where this "illness" was thought to be common.

In the essay Mimibukuro by Negishi Shizumori, a woman who was rumored to be a rokurokubi is married, but manages to live well since the rumor was nothing more than a rumor. She was not actually a rokurokubi, so she achieved a happy ending, which is unusual for tales about rokurokubi because bad fortune almost always results when the true identity of a rokurokubi is discovered.

In the Edo period encyclopedia, Wakan Sansai Zue Rokuokubi like creatures from Chinese lore are described. They are written as 飛頭蛮 meaning flying head barbarians. They use their ears like wings and they eat insects. The ones from China and Japan were believed to be foreigners. The foreigner nukekubi also appears in Rokurokubi by Lafcadio Hearn. In his story, the spirits masquerade as a family of woodcutters from the city who kill and eat travelers and mostly men.

== Neck extension ==
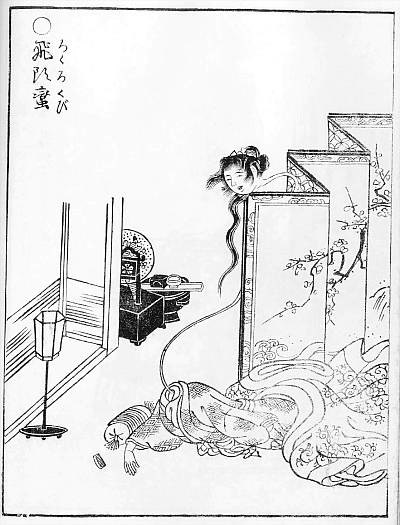
Rokurokubi (飛頭蛮) from the Gazu Hyakki Yagyō by Sekiyama Torien. What is depicted here is not a neck, but actually a string that connects the head to the body.

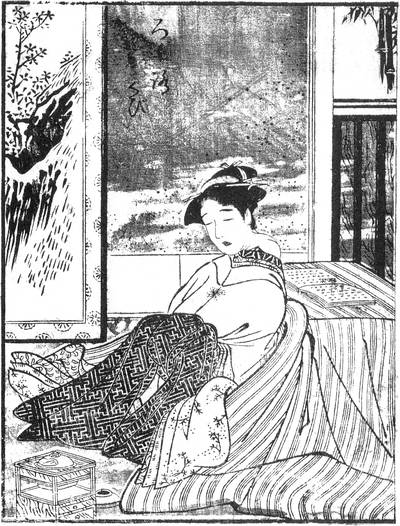
Rokuroubi from Rekkoku Kaidan Kikigaki Zōshi (列国怪談聞書帖) by Jippensha Ikku

Starting in the Edo period, tales were written about people's necks stretching when they were asleep. Examples of these tales are Buya Zokuda (武野俗談), Kanden Kōhitsu (閑田耕筆) and Yasō Kidan (夜窓鬼談).

It is thought that the idea of an extending neck originated from people misinterpreting visual depictions of nukekubi, the earlier kind of rokurokubi. There was the idea that nukekubi had a string attaching the head to the body and when this string was depicted in visual depictions, people misinterpreted this string as an elongated neck.

In the Kasshi Yawa (甲子夜話), there is a tale which tells of a female servant with a pale face who is suspected to be a rokurokubi. One night, her master checks on her while she is sleeping and sees something like steam gradually rise from her chest. The steam becomes thick and obscures her head and then suddenly it appears as though her neck has risen up and stretched. Perhaps due to being surprised from seeing her master, the girl stirs, turns over and her neck returned to normal. This servant had a pale face, but otherwise looked completely normal, but despite this, she was fired and in fact has had trouble staying in any job, always being fired shortly after being employed. For the soul to leave the body and create the shape of a neck, as seen in this story and the before mentioned Hokusō Sadan, is sometimes interpreted to be "ectoplasm" in parapsychology.

In the late Edo period yomihon (illustrated novel), Rekkoku Kaidan Kikigaki Zōshi (列国怪談聞書帖) by Jippensha Ikku the author suggests the elongated necks of rokurokubi originate in the spiritual principle, karma. In Ikku's work, Kaishin, a monk from Enshū and a woman called Oyotsu elope together. However, when Oyotsu collapsed from an illness, they ran out of money, so he killed her. When Kaishin eventually returned to secular life, he slept with a girl he met at an inn. When they sleep together, the girl's neck stretched and her face becomes that of Oyotsu, who then told him about her resentment. Kaishin felt regretful of his actions and proceeded to tell Oyotsu's father everything. The girl's father then told Kaishin that he has also killed a woman before. He stole her money and with it, he opened his inn. He had a daughter soon after who, due to karma, became a rokurokubi. Kaishin then reentered the priesthood. He built a grave for Oyotsu, said to be the Rokurokubi no Tsuka (Rokurokubi Mound), which told the story to future generations.

In some stories, rokurokubi are not a yōkai, but rather people who have an affliction that affects the body. For example, the Edo period author Ban Kōkei in his work "Kanden Kōhitsu" told a tale of a geisha at the Yoshiwara brothel whose neck would elongate in her sleep. It stated that her neck stretched due to her "heart becoming loose".

== Oral tradition ==
Rokurokobi also appear in the oral tradition of Japanese myths. For example, there is a myth about an old highway between the villages of Iwa and Akechi in Gifu Prefecture where it is said that a snake shapeshifted into a rokurokubi. Another example is a myth from the oral tradition of the Koikubo area of Iida, Nagano Prefecture where it is said a rokurokubi appeared in someone's home.

In the Bunka period, a kaidan story became popular, where there was a prostitute whose neck would smoothly stretch and would lick the oil of paper lanterns when she slept with guests, showing how rokurokubi were spoken of as things that women would transform into or an illness that they would be afflicted with. In this period, rokurokubi were also popular in freak shows. The Shohō Kenbunroku (諸方見聞録) records a freak show in 1810 (Bunka 7) in Edo, now Tokyo where a male rokurokubi with an elongated neck appeared.

Tales of rokurokubi appeared even in the early Meiji period. There was a tale of how a merchant and his wife from Shibaya town, Ibaraki, Osaka Prefecture who witnessed their daughter's neck stretch every night. Despite their supplications in Shinto and Buddhism, their daughter did not get better and eventually the whole town learned of it. The couple couldn't bear it anymore, so they left, leaving no clues as to where they went.

== Magic shows ==
The rokurokubi is also a kind of Japanese magic trick using curtains and life-sized dolls without heads. It's reported that a doll without a head wearing a kimono in seiza is put in front of the curtain. There's a rope behind the curtain and a female performer connected to it who shows only her face. As she stands and squats, the fake neck would stretch and contract, as if it were a rokurokubi.

Explanations and pictures about what's behind this trick were written in magazines of the Meiji period (1800s), giving a date for how early these shows first appeared. This was a time period when mystery phenomena were vigorously exposed by the scientifically-minded, so for magic tricks to be revealed is fitting with the zeitgeist.

In the Taishō period, there were businesses arranging rokurokubi to appear in show tents in festivals and fairs at temples and shrines and they were quite popular.

== Similar tales from other nations ==
The type of rokurokubi whose necks separate from the rest of the body is said to have derived from stories of the Chinese yōkai, the hitōban (飛頭蛮) a yōkai whose head separates from the body and floats about. Like the rokurokubi, the hitoban has a line around its neck. Chinese stories also tell of a yōkai called a rakutō (落頭) whose head comes off and floats about while the torso remains at rest on the futon. There is a tale that in the Three Kingdoms period, an Eastern Wu general, Zhu Huan employed a female servant who was a rakutō. It's said that she used its ears like wings. Another tale relates that in the Qin era, there was a clan from the south called rakutōmin (落頭民) who could fly around with only their heads.

There are legends of creatures including Palasik, Kuyang, and Leyak from Indonesia, Penanggalan in Malaysia, and Krasue in Thailand. The heads of these creatures would separate from the body and float about with the entrails attached.

The Chonchon is a mythical creature of South America which takes the form of a human head flying around in the air, sucking the life out of people.

The manananggal is a creature of Philippines mythology. This female monster is slightly different since its whole body from the waist up detaches and grows giant bat-like wings.

The yōkai researcher, Tada Katsumi states that these stories arrived in Japan in the Muromachi to Azuchi-Momoyama periods, when there was still trade with southern China and Southeast Asia. In the Edo period, when Japan adopted an isolationist policy an original Japanese yōkai, the rokurokubi evolved.

== In popular culture ==
- The rokurokubi was cited as an inspiration for the design of The Teacher in Little Nightmares 2.
- Jimmy Jupiter meets an old woman resembling a rokurokubi, albeit caucasian, in his first appearance in Marvel Mystery Comics #28 (February 1942).
- The Pokémon family of Misdreavus and Mismagius is based on the nukekubi.
- in Yo-kai Watch, Lady Longnek is based on the rokurokubi.
- In Hellboy: Sword of Storms, Hellboy has encounters with both nukekubi and rokurokubi. The nukekubi sequence was adapted from a short story from the Hellboy comics titled Heads.
- In the video game Tomodachi Collection, a Mii can have a dream where they are a rokurokubi, their neck extending when interacted with by the player.
- Sekibanki, the stage 2 boss of Touhou 14: Double Dealing Character is a rokurokubi. However, her attacks also show the ability of a nukekubi's head to fly freely.

== See also ==
- Dullahan
- Nure-onna
- Krasue
