= Kwaidan: Stories and Studies of Strange Things =

1904 book by Lafcadio Hearn

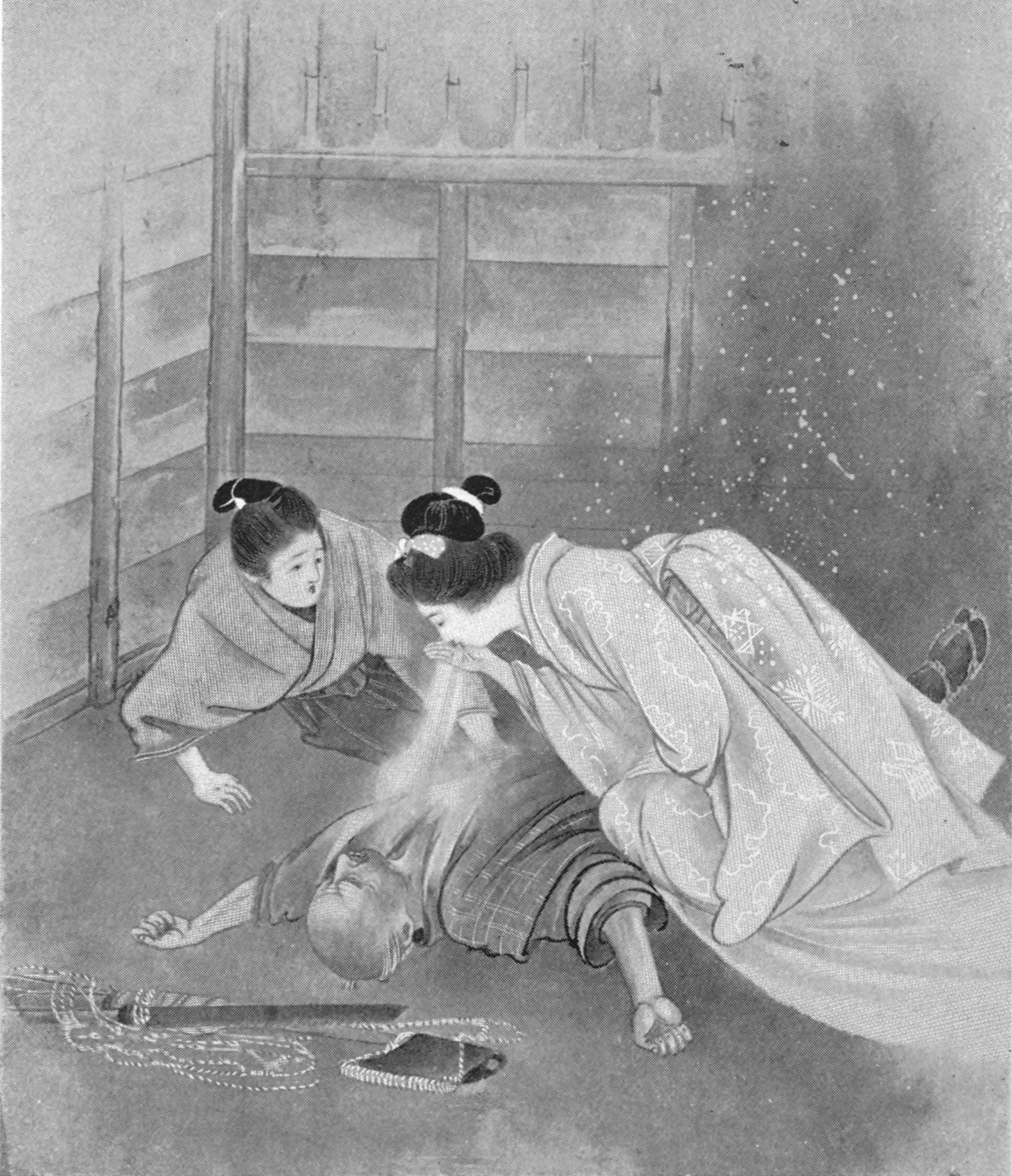
- Illustration by Keishū Takénouchi
- Author: Lafcadio Hearn
- Illustrator: Keishū Takénouchi
- Genre: Horror
- Publisher: Houghton Mifflin Company
- Publication date: April 2, 1904

Kwaidan: Stories and Studies of Strange Things (怪談, Kaidan; also archaic romanized Kwaidan), often shortened to Kwaidan ("ghost story"), is a 1904 book by Koizumi Yakumo (Lafcadio Hearn) that features several Japanese ghost stories and a brief non-fiction study on insects. It was later used as the basis for a 1964 film, Kwaidan, by Masaki Kobayashi.

== Stories ==
Hearn declares in his introduction to the first edition of the book, which he wrote on January 20, 1904, eight months before his death, that most of these stories were translated from old Japanese texts. However, a farmer in Musashi Province told him the tale of Yuki-Onna ("Snow Woman"). Legends of Yuki-Onna could be found throughout Japan and predate Kwaidan (including Glimpses of Unfamiliar Japan), though Hearn was unaware of them having previously been written and his version of a harmful Yuki-Onna is original. "Riki-Baka" is based on a personal experience of Hearn's. While he does not declare it in his introduction, "Hi-Mawari" – among the final narratives in the volume – seems to be a recollection of an experience in his childhood (it is, setting itself apart from almost all the others, written in the first person and set in rural Wales).

- "The Story of Mimi-nashi Hōichi"
- "Oshidori"
- "The Story of O-Tei"
- "Ubazakura"
- "Diplomacy"
- "Of a Mirror and a Bell"
- "Jikininki"
- "Mujina"
- "Rokurokubi" (description of folktale)
- "A Dead Secret"
- "Yuki-Onna"
- "The Story of Aoyagi"
- "Jiu-Roku-Zakura"
- "The Dream of Akinosuke"
- "Riki-Baka"
- "Hi-Mawari"
- "Hōrai"

== Insect studies ==
Hearn studied and wrote extensively on insects. The last section of Kwaidan contains three essays on insects and their connection to Chinese and Japanese beliefs.

- Butterflies: Personification of the human soul.
- Mosquitoes: Karmic reincarnation of jealous or greedy people in the form of Jiki-ketsu-gaki or "blood-drinking pretas".
- Ants: Mankind's superior in terms of chastity, ethics, social structure, longevity and evolution.

== See also ==
- Ghost stories
- Hoichi the Earless
