= Amma Darko =

Ghanaian writer (born 1956)

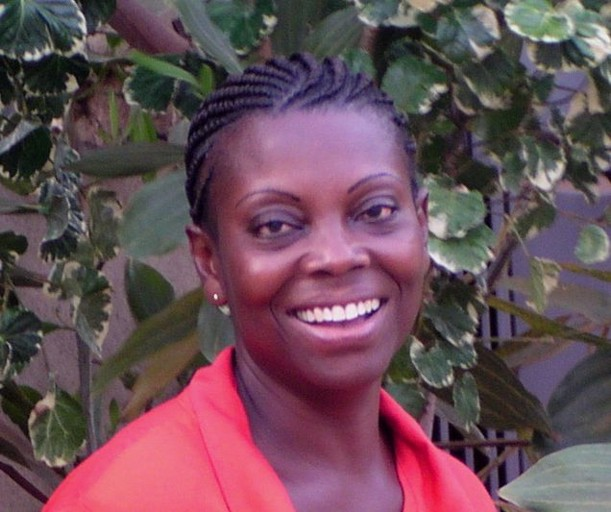
- Darko in 2004
- Born: 25 June 1956 (age 70); Koforidua, Ghana
- Citizenship: Ghanaian, German
- Occupation: Writer
- Years active: 1995–present
- Notable work: Faceless

Amma Darko (born 1956) is a Ghanaian novelist. She won The Golden Baobab Prize for one of her novels. She has published seven novels in total.

== Life and writing ==
She was born in Koforidua, Ghana, and grew up in Accra. She studied in Kumasi, where she received her diploma in 1980. Then she worked for the Science and Technology Center in Kumasi. During the 1980s, she lived and worked for some time in Germany. She has since returned to Accra.

Her novels illustrate everyday life in Ghana. She also paints clear pictures of the exploitation of women through her works. Her first novel, Beyond the Horizon, was originally published in Germany. Her most recent novels, Faceless and Not without flowers, were published in Ghana. She also wrote The Housemaid.

Her work has been discussed in Vincent O. Odamtten's book Broadening the Horizon: Critical Introductions to Amma Darko, in the 2001 doctoral thesis by Louise Allen Zak "Writing her way: a study of Ghanaian novelist Amma Darko", and in several academic journals.

== Bibliography ==
- [1991] 1995: Beyond the Horizon (Der verkaufte Traum). Heinemann/Schmetterling-Verl. ISBN 978-0-435-90990-1.

Darko's first novel is influenced by her impressions of Germany, observing the interaction between Germans and Ghanaian immigrants. The book is about a young woman, Mara, who follows her husband to Germany, not knowing that he has married a German in the meantime. Though the book deals with serious topics such as illegal immigration, illegitimate marriage and prostitution, there is never any bitter morality in it.

- 1996: Spinnweben ("Cobwebs"; no English edition). Schmetterling-Verl. ISBN 978-3-926369-17-8.

Her second novel is a reflection about roots. There are dialogues between a Ghanaian living in German and the German friends around her.

- 2000: Verirrtes Herz ("Stray heart"; no English edition). Schmetterling-Verlag. ISBN 978-3-89657-119-9.

This is the first book that is completely set in Ghana. The young protagonist, Kesewa, is illiterate. She has to work hard for her parents and brothers and is unable to attend school regularly. In her adult life, she becomes distrustful and envious and causes a lot of trouble.

- 2003: Faceless (Die Gesichtslosen). Sub-Saharan Publishers/Schmetterling-Verl. ISBN 978-9988-550-50-9.

A novel about a middle-class woman coming into contact with street children who are living in a part of Accra known as "Sodom and Gomorrhah".

- 2007: Not Without Flowers. Sub-Saharan Publishers. ISBN 978-9988-647-13-1.

In this book, the reader encounters some figures and institutions from the preceding novel. One of the central characters, Aggie, works for the NGO MUTE, which aims to create an archive and an alternative library. Aggie's mother has a mental disorder and is kept in a prayer camp. Idan, Aggie's husband, starts an affair with the very young Randa.

- 2015: Between Two Worlds. Sub-Saharan Publishers. ISBN 978-9988647933.

In this novel, two worlds converge: A Ghanaian man and a German woman fall in love in Germany, in the 1960s. Many years later, their grown-up twin daughters are confronted with information about the collapse of their parents' marriage. The reader sees the situation from both angles. He gets to know how the man grows up in the British colony Gold Coast and the woman in post-war Germany. The novel also has a spiritual dimension. The topic of twins is very important as well as the natural religion of the Akan people in Ghana with their fetish and clan priests, libations and drumming. As in her previous novels, Darko's humour shines through the serious topic.

- 2015: The Necklace of Tales. German translation: Das Halsband der Geschichten. Young readers' book. elbaol verlag hamburg, Meldorf 2019 ISBN 978-3-939771-74-6

This young readers' book brings the charm of the traditional Kweku Ananse stories into the context of our modern world. For centuries, the stories of this African folktale character were handed down orally through storytelling. The stories originated from the Ashantis, who form part of the Akan tribe of Ghana. Kweku is the day name of a Wednesday-born male and Ananse is Akan for spiders. In this story, which is the first of a series, the Kweku Ananse tales are recounted through the experiences of an orphan girl named Obiba and by virtue of a mysterious set of beads. "The Necklace of Tales", as the bead necklace is known, is as old as the universe. Inside it are captured the Kweku Ananse stories. It comes into the possession of the orphan Obiba, who is living a difficult life with her unkind aunt in Ghana's capital Accra.

The Kweku Ananse character is a spider with human characteristics. His eight limbs are often depicted as four arms and four legs. His special relationship with the Creator goes back to the time of creation. He is wise and cunning and a trickster. Every Kweku Ananse tale bears some subtle advice and words of wisdom. Told and retold by the captives from the Ashanti tribe during the trans-Atlantic slave trade, the Kweku Ananse stories spread to other parts of the world. They have evolved in places such as the southern parts of the US, the West Indies and the Caribbean.

== Scholarly works about Darko's writings ==
- Aiyetoro, Mary B. & Valentine Chimenem Owhorodu. "Causes, Effects, and Feminist Antidotes to Trafficking in Amma Darko's Beyond the Horizon. Ibadan Journal of English Studies 7 (2018): 185–196.
