= Yuki-onna =

Snow spirit in Japanese folklore

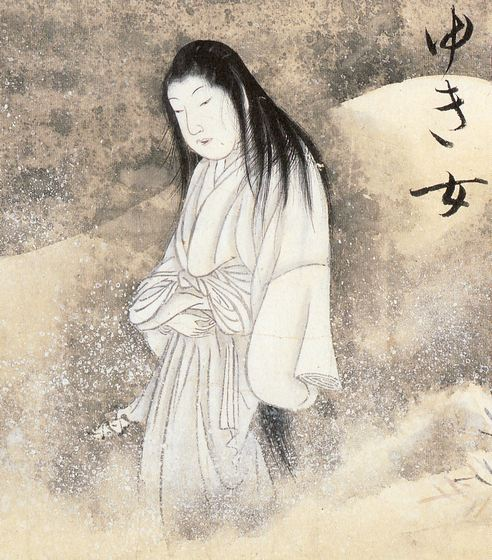
Yuki-onna (ゆき女) from the Hyakkai-Zukan by Sawaki Suushi

Yuki-onna (雪女; lit. 'snow woman') is a yūrei or yōkai in Japanese folklore that is often depicted in Japanese literature, films, or animation.

She may also go by such names as yuki-musume (雪娘, "snow daughter"), yukihime (雪姫, "snow princess"), yuki-onago (雪女子, "snow girl"), yukijorō (雪女郎, "snow woman"), yuki anesa (雪姉さ, "snow sis"), yuki-onba (雪乳母, "snow granny" or "snow nanny"), yukinba (雪婆, "snow hag") in Ehime, yukifuri-baba (雪降り婆々, "snowfall witch" or "snowfall hag") in Nagano. They are also called several names that are related to icicles, such as tsurara-onna, kanekori-musume, and shigama-nyōbō.

== Origins ==
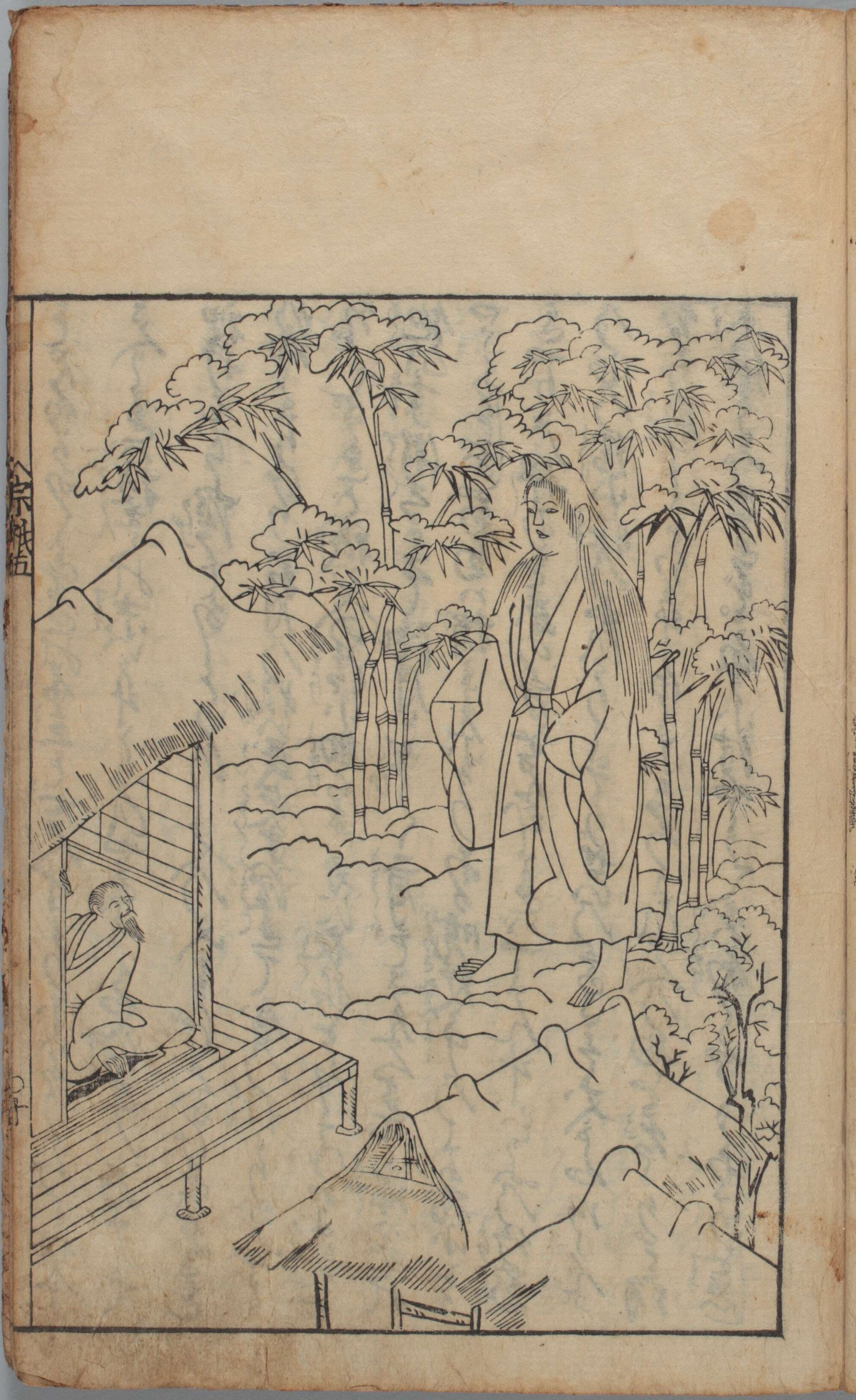
Yuki-onna illustration from Sogi Shokoku Monogatari

Yuki-onna originates from folklores of olden times; in the Muromachi period Sōgi Shokoku Monogatari by the renga poet Sōgi, there is a statement on how he saw a yuki-onna when he was staying in Echigo Province (now Niigata Prefecture), indicating that the legends already existed in the Muromachi period.

== Stories ==
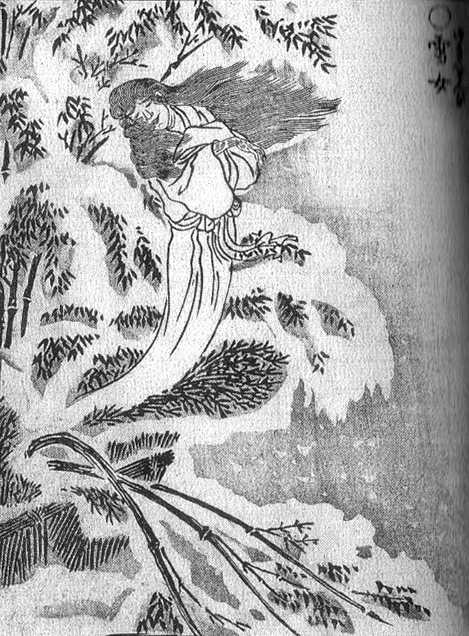
Yuki-onna (雪女) from the Gazu Hyakki Yakō by Toriyama Sekien

In legends from the Ojiya region of Niigata Prefecture, a beautiful woman came to visit a man and became his wife from the woman's own desire. This woman was reluctant to go into the bath and when she was made to go in anyway, she disappeared, leaving only thin, fragmented, floating icicles (see also tsurara-onna).

In the Aomori and Yamagata prefectures, there is a similar story about one called the "shigama-onna." In the Kaminoyama region of Yamagata, a yuki-onna would come visit an old couple on a snowy night to warm herself by the irori. When late at night the yuki-onna would again go out on a journey, the old man would attempt to take her hand to stop her, when he noticed that she was chillingly cold. Then, before his eyes, the girl turned into a whirl of snow that exited the house through the chimney. Also, it has some points of similarity with the kokakuchō; and on the night of a blizzard, as the yuki-onna would be standing there hugging a child (yukinko), it would ask people passing by to hug the child as well. When one hugs the child, the child would become heavier and heavier until one would become covered with snow and freeze to death. It has also been told that if one refuses, one would be shoved down into a snowy valley.

In Hirosaki in Aomori is a legend that there was a warrior (bushi) who was asked by a yuki-onna to hug a child similarly, but the warrior held a short sword (tantō) by the mouth and hugged the child while making the blade go close to the child's head, which allowed the warrior to avoid the aforementioned phenomenon. When the warrior handed the child back to the yuki-onna, the ghoul gave many treasures as thanks for hugging the child. It is also said that those who are able to withstand the ever-increasing weight of the yukinko and last all the way through would acquire great physical strength.

In the Ina region of Nagano Prefecture, the yuki-onna is called "yukionba", and it is believed that they would appear on a snowy night in the form of a yama-uba. Similarly, in Yoshida, Ehime Prefecture, on a night when snow is accumulating on the ground, a "yukinba" is said to appear, and people would make sure not to let their children outside. Also, in the Tōno region of Iwate Prefecture, and on Little New Year (koshōgatsu) or the 15th day of the first month, a yuki-onna would take many children along to a field to play, so children were warned against going outside. It can be thus seen that yuki-onna are often considered the same as the yama-uba, sharing the similarity that they are fecund and take many children along with them.

In the Ito region of Wakayama Prefecture, it is said that there would be a one-legged child jump-walking on a night when snow accumulates, and the next morning there would be round footprints remaining, and this would be called the "yukinbō" (snow child), but the one-legged snow kid is thought to be the servant of a mountain god.

In the village of Oshika, Tōhaku District, Tottori Prefecture (now Misasa), it has been said that a yuki-onna would come during light snow and say, "Koori gose yu gose" ("Give me ice, give me hot water")—"gose" being a dialect word for "give me"—while waving around a white wand, and she would bulge when splashed with water and disappear when splashed with hot water.

In the area around the Kumano River in Yoshino District, Nara Prefecture, the "Oshiroi baa-san" or "oshiroi babaa" is also thought to be a type of yuki-onna, and they are said to drag along mirrors, making clinking sounds while doing so. These characteristics, that of waving around a white wand (gohei) and possessing a mirror, are thought to be the characteristics of a miko who serves a mountain god that rules over birth and harvest.

In Aomori, it is said that a yuki-onna would come down to the village on the third day of Shōgatsu and return to the mountains on the first day of Rabbit, and it is thought that on years when the day of Rabbit is late in arriving, how well the harvest does will be different from before.

In the Iwate and the Miyagi prefectures, a yuki-onna is thought to steal people's vitality; and in Niigata Prefecture, they are said to take the livers out of children and freeze people to death. In Nishimonai, Akita Prefecture, looking at a yuki-onna's face and exchanging words with her would result in being eaten. In Ibaraki Prefecture and in Iwaki Province, Fukushima Prefecture, it is said that if one does not answer when called by a yuki-onna, one would be shoved down into the bottom of a valley. In the Fukui Prefecture, they are called "koshi-musume" (越娘, "passing girl") and it is said that those who turn their backs to a koshi-musume when being called by one would get pushed into a valley.

In Ibigawa, Ibi District, Gifu Prefecture, an invisible monster called the "yukinobō" is said to change its appearance and appear as a yuki-onna. It is said that this monster would appear at mountain huts and ask for water, but if one grants the request, one would be killed, so one should give hot tea instead. It is said that in order to make the yukinbō go away, one should chant "Saki kuromoji ni ato bōshi, shimetsuke haitara, ikanaru mono mo, kanō mai" (meaning "A kurujo in front and a bōshi behind, by wearing these tight, nothing is possible").

The Hirosaki, Aomori legend about a yuki-onna returning to the human world on New Year's Day (Shōgatsu) and the legend in Tōno, Iwate Prefecture about yuki-onna taking away many children to play on "Little New Year" — looking at the days on which they visit, both legends offer insight on how the yuki-onna has some characteristics of a toshigami. The story of how when one person treated a yuki-onna with kindness on a blizzard night, the yuki-onna turned into gold the next morning; illustrating how even in old tales such as the Ōtoshi no Kyaku, the yuki-onna has some relation to the characteristics of a toshigami.

Yuki-onna often appear while taking along children. This is in common with another yōkai that takes along children, the ubume. In the Mogami District, Yamagata Prefecture, ubume are said to be yuki-onna.

They often appear in stories about inter-species marriage, and stories similar to Lafcadio Hearn's Yuki-onna where a mountain hunter gets together with a woman who stays the night as a guest and eventually births a child. One day the man carelessly talks about the taboo of getting together with a yuki-onna, resulting in the woman revealing herself to be a yuki-onna, but not killing the man due to having a child between them and warning, "If anything happens to the child, you won't get away with it" before going away. These stories can be found in Niigata Prefecture, Toyama Prefecture, and the Nagano Prefecture, which came about as a result of many stories about mountain people where those who break the mountain taboos would be killed by mountain spirits. There is also the hypothesis that the yuki-onna legend was born from a mixture of paranormal stories of mountain people and the paranormal yuki-onna stories.

Old tales about yuki-onna are mostly stories of sorrow, and it is said that these tales started from when people who have lived gloomy lives, such as childless old couples or single men in mountain villages, would hear the sound of a blizzard knocking on their shutter door and fantasize that the thing that they longed for has come. It is said that after that, they would live in happiness with what they longed for in a fantasy as fleeting as snow. There is also a feeling of fear, and like as in the Tōno Monogatari, the sound of a blizzard knocking on an outer shōji is called the "shōji sasuri" (rubbing a shōji), and there is a custom of making children who stayed up late go to sleep quickly when a yuki-onna rubs a shōji. From real sayings such as the shōji sasuri, it is said that things that one longs for sit back-to-back with fear. Also, winter is the season when gods would come to visit, and if one does not pay respects, terrible things will happen, so even if it is said to be things that one longs for, one cannot put too much trust in that. In any case, it can be said to be related to the coming and going of seasons. Nobuyoshi Furuhashi, scholar of Japanese literature, stated that the novel Kaze no Matasaburō is also probably somehow related.

There are various legends about the yuki-onna's true identity, such as a snow spirit or the spirit of a woman who fell over in the snow. In a setsuwa of the Oguni region of Yamagata Prefecture, a yuki-jorō (yuki-onna) was originally a princess of the moon world, and in order to leave a boring lifestyle came down to Earth together with snow but was unable to go back to the moon and so appears on snowy moonlit nights.

Yamaoka Genrin, an intellectual from the Edo period, said that yuki-onna is born from snow. It was supposed that if there were a lot of something, a living thing would come forth from it, giving birth to fish if the water is deep enough and birds if the forest is thick enough. Since both snow and women are "yin", so in places like Echigo it is said that yuki-onna might be born from within deep snow.

Among Japan's traditional culture, yuki-onna can be seen in kōwaka such as the Fushimi Tokiwa (伏見常磐), which can also be checked in modern times. In Chikamatsu Monzaemon's Yuki-onna Gomai Hagoita, the story is about how a woman who was deceived and murdered became a yuki-onna and took revenge as a vengeful ghost. The bewitching and frightening aspects of a yuki-onna are often used in such depictions. Old tales and legends like these have been confirmed in Aomori, Yamagata, Iwate, Fukushima, Niigata, Nagano, Wakayama, Ehime, among other places.

== Appearance ==
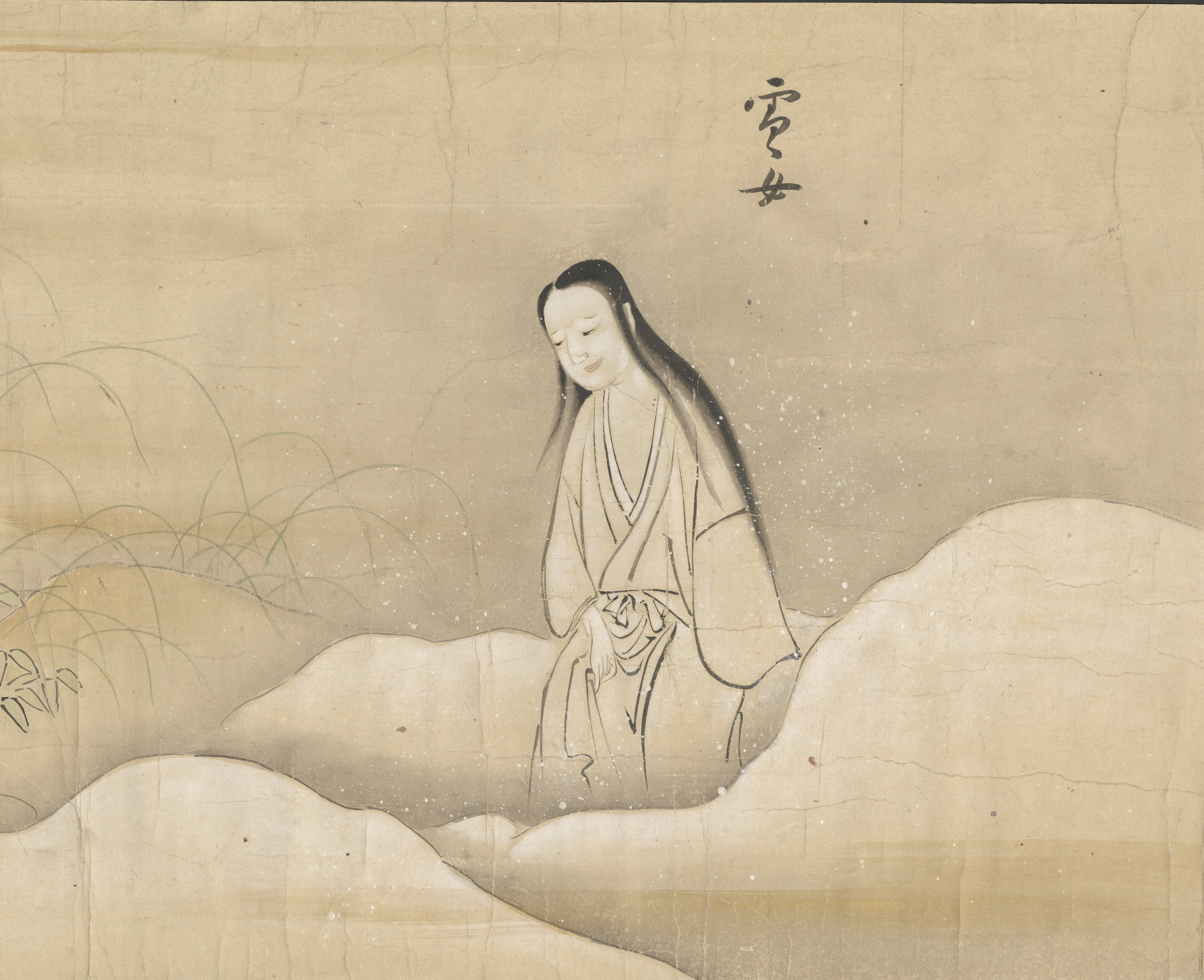
Yuki-onna (雪女) from Bakemono no e (化物之繪, c. 1700), Harry F. Bruning Collection of Japanese Books and Manuscripts, L. Tom Perry Special Collections, Harold B. Lee Library, Brigham Young University.

Yuki-onna appears on snowy nights as a tall, beautiful woman with long black hair and blue lips. Her inhumanly pale or even transparent skin makes her blend into the snowy landscape (as famously described in Lafcadio Hearn's Kwaidan: Stories and Studies of Strange Things). She often wears a white kimono, but other legends describe her as nude, with only her face and hair standing out against the snow. Despite her inhuman beauty, her eyes can strike terror into mortals. She floats across the snow, leaving no footprints (in fact, some tales say she has no feet, a feature of many Japanese ghosts), and she can transform into a cloud of mist or snow if threatened.

== Variations ==
There are several variations of Yuki-onna throughout Japan, through which one can fill a whole book only about this yokai. Some notable of them are described below:

- Water Beggars: This variation hails from Tottori Prefecture, where it is said that Yuki-onna travels on wind and appears on the days with a light snowfall. She walks swinging a white Gohei wand and shouts whoever she meets saying, "Please give me water-hot or cold." If anyone gives cold water, she swells in size but if anyone gives hot water she melts and disappears.
- The Moon Princess: This variations hails from Yamagata Prefecture where it is said that Yuki-onna is the princess of lunar world, living on the moon. Her life was filled with luxury, but it was extremely boring for her. She was fascinated to see the planet Earth below. So, she snuck out one night and fell down to Earth, travelling on snow. However, coming to Earth was easier for her than going back, and she got stuck on Earth. She used to appear on full moon snowy night, pining for her old home.
- The Snow Vampire: This version of Yuki-onna hails from four Japanese provinces; Aomori, Gunma, Niigata, and Miyagi. Here it is said that Yuki-onna is a dreadful snow vampire, haunting the snowy forests, looking to feed. She lives by sucking the vital energy of human body, which is mentioned as seiki. She is said to extract the seiki first by freezing victims to death and then sucking the seiki through the dead victim's mouth. Especially in Niigata prefecture, it is said that Yuki-onna likes the seiki of children, so the mothers are warned over there not to let their children play on snowy nights near a forest.
- The Talking Snow Women: This version hails from Ibaraki, Fukushima, Akita & Fukui prefectures. Here, the Yuki-onna engages her victims in conversation in order to attack. When she meets someone on a dark and snowy night, she calls out to them. If the person answers her greeting, she attacks. But in Fukushima and Ibaraki, it is said that Yuki-onna attacks those who ignore her, whom she grabs and throws into a nearby ravine.

== Behavior ==
Some legends say the Yuki-onna, being associated with winter and snowstorms, is the spirit of someone who perished in the snow. She is at the same time beautiful and serene, yet ruthless in killing unsuspecting mortals. Until the 18th century, she was almost uniformly portrayed as evil. Today, however, stories often color her as mere human, emphasizing her ghost-like nature and ephemeral beauty.

In many stories, Yuki-onna appears to travelers trapped in snowstorms and uses her icy breath to leave them as frost-coated corpses. Other legends say she leads them astray so they simply die of exposure. Other times, she manifests holding a child. When a well-intentioned soul takes the "child" from her, they are frozen in place. Parents searching for lost children are particularly susceptible to this tactic. Other legends make Yuki-onna much more aggressive. In these stories, she often invades homes, blowing in the door with a gust of wind to kill residents in their sleep (some legends require her to be invited inside first).

What Yuki-onna is after varies from tale to tale. Sometimes she is simply satisfied to see a victim die. Other times, she is more vampiric, draining her victims' blood or "life force." She occasionally takes on a succubus-like manner, preying on weak-willed men to drain or freeze them through sex or a kiss.

Like the snow and winter weather she represents, Yuki-onna has a softer side. She sometimes lets would-be victims go for various reasons. In one popular Yuki-onna legend, for example, she sets a young boy free because of his beauty and age. She makes him promise never to speak of her, but later in life, he tells the story to his wife who reveals herself to be Yuki-Onna. She reviles him for breaking his promise but spares him again, this time out of concern for their children (but if he dares mistreat their children, she will return with no mercy. Luckily for him, he is a loving father). In some versions, she chose not to kill him because he told her, which she did not treat as a broken promise (technically, Yuki-Onna herself is not a human and thus did not count). In a similar legend, Yuki-onna melts away once her husband discovers her true nature. However, she departs to the afterlife afterward the same way. In the same version of the story, the Yuki-Onna is seen with a stutter saying "It was I-I-I! Yuki it was!". In some versions, Yuki-onna doesn't leave and that she actually stays with her husband and their children, since it doesn't count as telling anyone else.

=== Lafcadio Hearn's version ===
A long time ago, there lived two woodcutters, Minokichi and Mosaku. Minokichi was young and Mosaku was very old.

One winter day, they could not come back home because of a snowstorm. They found a hut in the mountain and decided to sleep there. On this particular evening, Minokichi woke up and found a beautiful lady with white clothes. She breathed on old Mosaku and he was frozen to death.

She then approached Minokichi to breathe on him, but stared at him for a while and said, "I thought I was going to kill you, the same as that old man, but I will not because you are young and beautiful. You must not tell anyone about this incident. If you tell anyone about me, I will kill you."

Several years later, Minokichi met a beautiful young lady, named O-yuki (Yuki = "snow") and married her. She was a good wife. Minokichi and O-yuki had several children and lived happily for many years. Mysteriously, she did not age.

One night, after the children were asleep, Minokichi said to O-yuki: "Whenever I see you, I am reminded of a mysterious incident that happened to me. When I was young, I met a beautiful young lady like you. I do not know if it was a dream or if she was a Yuki-onna..."

After finishing his story, O-yuki suddenly stood up and said "That woman you met was me! I told you that I would kill you if you ever told anyone about that incident. However, I can't kill you because of our children. Take care of our children..." Then she melted and disappeared. No one saw her again.

=== In media ===
- This version was directly adapted into the 1965 anthology film Kwaidan as The Woman of the Snow and loosely adapted as the segment Lovers Vow in the 1990 film Tales from the Darkside: The Movie.
- The 1968 fantasy horror film The Snow Woman starring Shiho Fujimura is generally considered the most faithful adaptation of Lafcadio Hearn's telling; apart from altering the names of the sculptors and expanding side elements of the narrative, the film stays largely true to the source material.
- Akira Kurosawa's 1990 anthology film Dreams, a Yuki-onna appears in "The Blizzard" segment.
- Froslass of Generation IV in the Pokémon series is based on the Yuki-onna.
- Mizore Shirayuki in the manga/anime series Rosario + Vampire is based on the Yuki-onna.
- Setsura is a Yuki-Onna, who part of Nura: Rise of the Yokai Clan story summary.
- The Yuki-onna appears in the manga/anime series YuYu Hakusho as well as its anime adaptation, with one of the leads Hiei being born to one along with his twin sister Yukina.
- Yuki-onna (Frostina in the English versions) appears in the Yo-Kai Watch franchise.
- The promotional music video for Sasameyuki by Wagakki Band shows lead singer Yuko Suzuhana playing an awakening yuki-onna.
- Letty Whiterock from the Touhou Project franchise is a Yuki-onna.
- Yuki-onna served as the main lyrical inspiration behind the Symphony X song "Lady of the Snow", from their 1998 album Twilight in Olympus.
- In the 2004 role-playing game Yume Nikki, Yuki-onna (Snow Woman in the Steam version of the game) is one of the obtainable effects in the game. Upon use, it turns Madotsuki into a Yuki-Onna.
- The Magic: the Gathering set Saviors of Kamigawa includes a "Yuki-onna" card, and the novels Heretic: Betrayers of Kamigawa and Guardian: Saviors of Kamigawa by Scott McGough feature an unnamed yuki-onna character.
- "Yuki-onna, the Ice Mayakashi" from Yu-Gi-Oh! Trading Card Game and her evolved forms are based on the Yuki-onna.
- Singer Yoshiko Sai wrote and recorded a song about the Yuki-onna.
- The Yuki-onna appears in the manga/anime series In/Spectre season 2 episodes 2 and 3, where a Yuki-onna saves a man from death on a mountain.
- The character Noel Izumi from Studio Apartment, Good Lighting, Angel Included is a Yuki-onna.
- Yuki-onna appears in the novel The Causal Angel as a representation of the character the pelligrini when the Zoku put her servant Mieli into a realm designed to emulate a ronin's battle to defeat Yuki-onna.
- In the manga Monster Musume, the character Yukio is a Yuki-onna and the proprietess of the Sno Ball Hot Springs Resort.
- In The Ice Guy and His Cool Female Colleague, siblings Yukiya and Yukimi Himuro are descendants of a Yuki-onna
- In the classic Takahashi Rumiko manga and anime franchise Urusei Yatsura, The character of Miyuki is based on the Yuki-onna legends.

== See also ==
- Jack Frost
- Shirahime-Syo: Snow Goddess Tales
- Suzy Snowflake
- "The Snow Queen"
- Take no yuki
- Tsuru no Ongaeshi
- KalGa Jaad
- White Lady
- Yama-uba
- Yeti
- Yuki-onna Monogatari
