= Kekkai =

Kekkai may refer to:

- Kekkai (Buddhism) (結界), a Japanese Buddhist term, itself a translation of the Hindu term sīmābandha (सीमाबन्ध), commonly used in fiction to refer to a spiritual or magical force field
- Kekkai (血塊), a type of sankai, a yōkai that is born to a woman

== See also ==
- Glossary of Hinduism terms
- Glossary of Japanese Buddhism
- Glossary of Shinto
- Kekkai Sensen, a Japanese manga series
- Kekkaishi, a Japanese manga series
