= Aosaginohi =

Japanese mythological bird

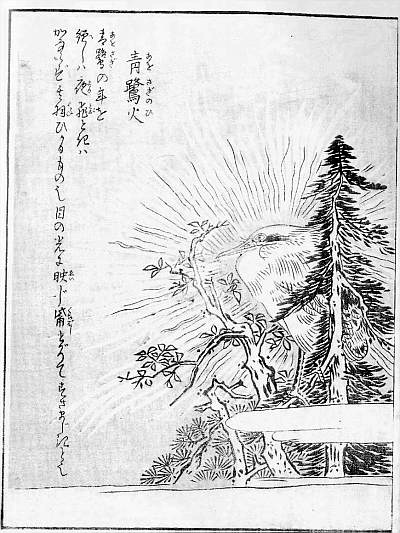
Aosaginohi from Toriyama Sekien's Konjaku Gazu Zoku Hyakki (1779)

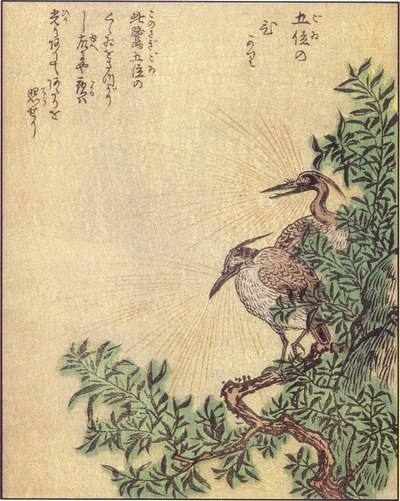
Goi no hikari from Tōsanjin's Ehon hyaku monogatari (1841) illustrated by Takehara Shunsen

Aosaginohi, or Aosagibi (青(あお)鷺(さぎ)火(び), "blue heron fire") is a will-o'-the-wisp type phenomenon in the night, a ball of flame or strange glowing light (hikarimono), explained as people mistaking the heron's glittering wings and glowing eyes. The ao sagi (青鷺; lit. "blue heron") in modern taxonomy refers to the Eurasian grey heron.

The strange light phenomenon is also called goi no hi (五位の火; "fifth rank fire") or goi no hikari (五位の光; "fifth rank light") where goi sagi (五位鷺; lit. "fifth rank heron") refers to a species of night heron.

The aosagi-no-hi appears in the illustrated yōkai compendium, Toriyama Sekien's Konjaku Gazu Zoku Hyakki (pub. 1779), whereas goi no hikari appears in Tōsanjin's Ehon hyaku monogatari (1841) illustrated by Takehara Shunsen].

Since the Edo Period, these mystery lights have been explained away as herons whose wings and eyes glowed in the dark as they flew. Tōsanjin and other writers have added this was merely an example of naturally occurring bioluminescence.

Rumor about a glowing heron being killed and eaten by a samurai occurs in Mimibukuro (1805), and other works into the modern period record instances where people claimed to have seen unusual glowing lights connected to herons, ducks, etc.

== Attestations ==
There is a mix of ao sagi fires and goi sagi lights attested in past literature and folkloric records, considered cognate phenomena.

=== Edo period ===
In the physician Nakayama Sanryū (中山三柳)'s Daigo zuhitsu (醍醐随筆; "Cream-of-the-crop essays", Kanbun 10/1670), a certain person thought he shot a hikarimono (光り物; "glowing object"), but it turned out to be an aosagi (鵊鶄, lit "blue heron"), i.e., a glowing bird. The leishu type Japanese encyclopedia Kōbunko which quotes this passage from this work files it under the goisagi subsection and not the aosagi subsection, (Note: Daigo zuhitsu 醍醐随筆, volume 2/下, 39.) and these same characters (鵊鶄) is typically read goisagi in other quotes from works, below.

Yamaoka Genrin's Kokon hyaku monogatari hyōban (pub. Jōkyō 3/1686]) describes a strange recurrent fire or light phenomenon (cf. aburabō), with the attached story as follows: an eastern Ōmi Province oil merchant who had supplied oil to the Main Hall (chūdō) of Enryaku-ji had been revoked its 10,000 koku (annual rice harvest volume) of land privilege (chigyō), and with the business floundering, died in misery. Afterwards, strange glowing objects were seen near the site of that oil merchant's business, and seemed to be drawn to oil-lit light, so the phantasm was dubbed "oil thief" (though it did not actually steal). Someone even claimed to have seen a shaven flying head blowing fire. The author Genrin weighs in on the events and concluded these were "blue heron" sightings. A heron of advanced aged, he writes, always gleams when flying by night, glowing its eyes in sync, with the beak is pointed ferociously. (Note: This is nearly verbatim repeated later by Toriyama Sekien (cf. below).) This is naturally often mistaken for a hikarimono (phantom light). (Note: Hyaku monogatari hyōban 百物語評判, Book 3, No. 7.)

A comparative cognate example is the story in Kikuoka Senryō's Shokoku rijindan (pub. Kyōhyō era/1741–1744) concerning the eerie "hag fire" story (cf. uba-ga-bi). The tale is set in Hiraoka, Kawachi Province (later Hiraoka, Osaka). An old woman who was stealing lamp oil was rumored to have turned into a uba-ga-bi (姥ヶ火; lit. "hag fire"). But there was a witness who saw it land nearby, and he lay flat to observe furtively, and discovered it to be a chicken-like bird, and heard beak-tapping sounds. It flew away after a short pause, but the man saw that in flight it looked like a round-shaped fire from a distance. The author concludes it must have been a night heron (goisagi). (Note: Shokoku rijindan 諸国里人談 3: 18.)

The encyclopedia Wakan sansai zue (pub. 1712 has an entry for goisagi (鵊鶄; "night heron"), which in its flight seemed like fire, looked especially bright on a moonlit-night, so that people were wont to mistaken it for a yōkai.

According to Noda Shigegata (野田成方)'s Urami kanwa (裏見寒話; "Reversal view cold tales") (preface dated Hōreki 2/1752), which was a Kai Province geographical treatise, there was a grass plain called Mikazuki-hara in Senzuka (now part of Kofu, Yamanashi) where fire appeared at night and looked like lanterns from afar. The geographer adds that whenever a fire about the size of a kemari (Japanese soccer) ball appeared in the pine and sugi forests, bobbing up and down, coastal folk called it "sagi-bi" or "heron light". It was explained by someone that when the "blue herons" perch on trees and get shaken in the wind, their wings will shimmer. (Note: Urami kanwa 裏見寒話 Book 5.) (Note: The author (Noda) compares the phenomenon to static electricity sparks visible when stroking a cat in the dark. Cf. § Explanations below.)

The bird-glow is also featured in the well-known illustrated compendia of yōkai from the period, namely Toriyama Sekien's Konjaku gazu zoku hyakki (pub. 1779)）and writer Tōsanjin and illustrator Takehara Shunsen's Ehon hyaku monogatari (1841).

Sekien's "Aosagi-no-hi" page (cf. fig, right) bears a caption which reads that an aged "blue heron" (translated as grey heron) has gleaming wings in night flight, with eyes aglow, and "their beaks are fiercely sharp", etc. (nearly the same description as given by Genrin discussed above). (Note: The English translators identify the bird as the Eurasian "grey heron", with "grey" spelt UK-style. North America has the great blue heron which is a similar large heron.)

In the Ehon hyaku monogatari, Shunsen's illustration (cf. fig, above right) of the "Goi-no-hikari" (lit. "fifth rank glow", i.e. "night heron's glow") explains in caption that the bird was bestowed the courtly fifth rank, and began to lighten up its surroundings with its luster. The book also contains prose text penned by Tōsanjin, which delves into the ying-yang theoretical consideration on flames, and states "when on sees the fifth-rank heron (night heron) resting in the pitch-dark night, it appears like fire glowing blue", adding that the phenomena of glow-in-the-dark abound in the natural world, etc.

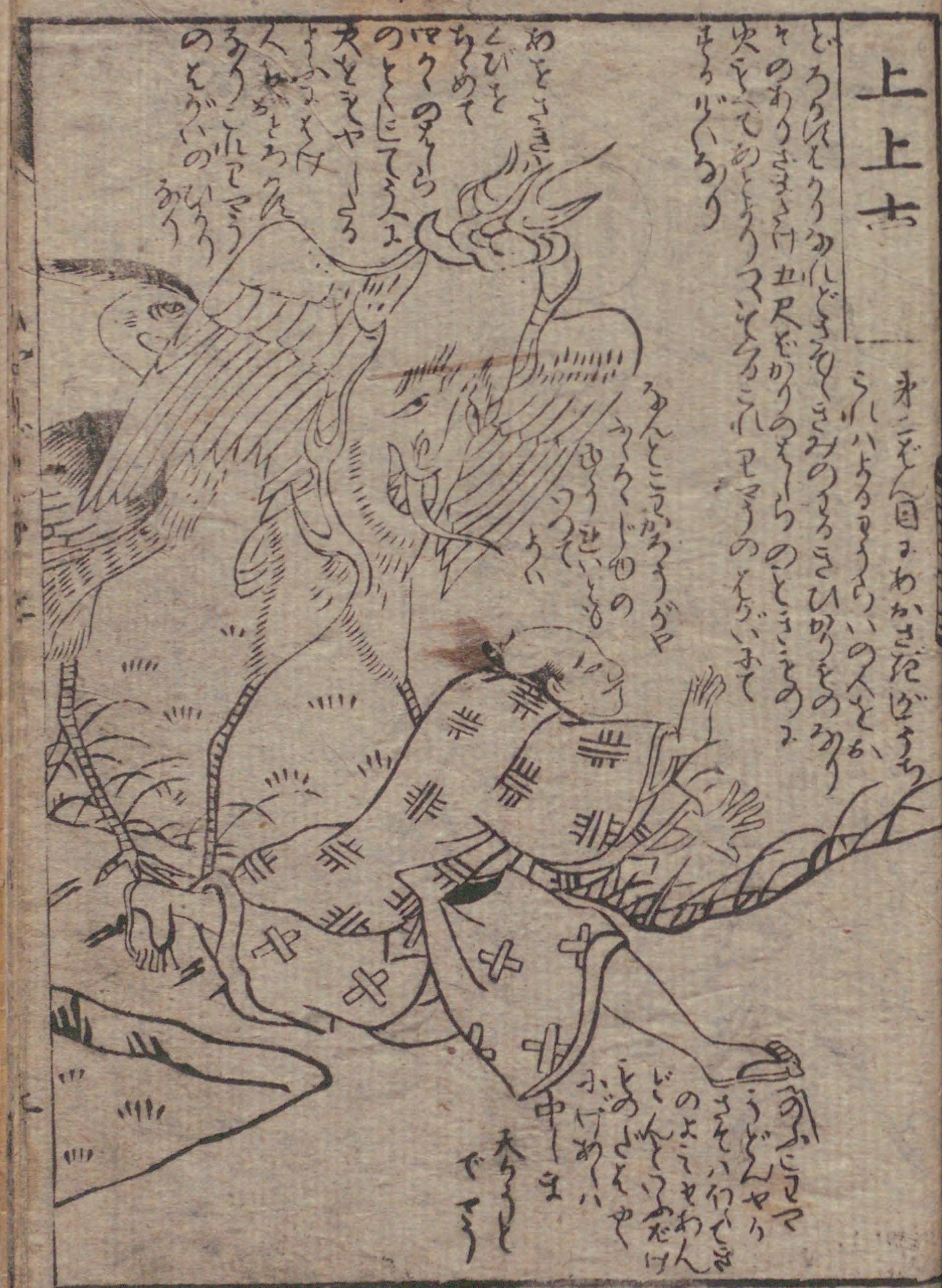
Aosagi. Bakemono Shiuchi Hyōbanki (1779) by Koikawa Harumachi.

The kibyoshi genre writer Koikawa Harumachi's Bakemono shiuchi hyōbanki (妖怪仕内評判記; "Compilation of Monster Critiques", pub. An'ei 8/1779) (cf. fig. right) is a book about the boss yōkai ōnyudō holding a contest of shiuchi or tricks to be played on humans, in order to rank them. The aosagi blue heron ranks second, for it turns into an eerie hikarimono glowing objects by night to frighten people, and according to Harumachi, transforms into a burning pillar about 5 feet (shaku) tall. The bird shrinks its neck thus mimicking the shape of a square pillar, and flaps its wings crossed over to simulate flickering flames, according to this writer.

Some years later, another gesaku (burlesque) writer Sakuragawa Jihinari's Bakemono haruasobi (変化物春遊; "monsters' spring trips/jests", pub. Kansei 5/1793) claims that in Yamato Province there stood a large willow tree from which blue flames could be seen on a nightly basis, and hence called bake yanagi ("freak willow"), and people avoided it. One rainy night, a man thought he was confident no fire will burn during a downpour, and approached, whereupon the willow grew bluer than ever and the man collapsed. The phantom light was caused by the "blue heron" according to the storyteller.

The miscellany Mimibukuro records an event around the autumn of (Bunka 2/1805), where a man from Yotsuya, met a person clad in white without a lower body in the streets during the night, and suspecting it to be a ghost, turned around to see a glowing single eye, so he abruptly slashed it with a sword. When the man stabbed the fallen creature for the final blow, it turned out to be a heron. He kept the heron and ate it, so the rumor spread that he ate ghost stew.

Katō Jun'an's Saezuri gusa (written during Tenpō era to Bunkyū 3, c. 1833–1863; published 1910) explains that a ying fire is blue light without a flame, and emitted by such animals as foxes, weasels, night herons, jellyfish, octopuses, and fireflies.

=== Modern examples ===
Some reports describe grey herons and blue herons as appearing blue-white, a phenomenon that has been compared with the legendary aosagi-no-hi.

there are also legends that the heron flies while carrying a burning piece of branch in its mouth, or that it spits fire. In the Metropolitan Tokyo area, there has been a reported sighting of the night heron spewing fire at the surface of the Tama River.

On Sado Island, Niigata Prefecture in what used to be Niibo village (now part of Sado city), legend has it that strange fire phenomena called "dragon lantern" (ryūtō) were seen flying almost nightly by the local ume tree at Konpon-ji temple. When someone shot it with an arrow, it turned out to be a heron.

Ibaraki Prefecture's local historian Kimimori Sarashina (更科公護) published an instance of him witnessing fuzzy blue-white light flying around May or June c. 1928, in the city of Chikusei, and remarks that night herons are often said to glow. In Ibaraki township, he saw a yoshigamo (falcated duck) and a karugamo (Eastern spot-billed duck) glowing. Another local historian Mitsuji Zama (Note: Zama's expertise is at Sagamihara, Kanagawa.) reported the folklore around Kasumigaura, Ibaraki that a heron supposedly turns into a fireball.

== Rational explanations ==
In the aforementioned 1712 encyclopedia Wakan sansai zue there is already the observation that the luminescence of a night heron flying at night has been taken to be a yōkai phenomenon by people at large. And Urami kanwa (1754) compares the "heron fire" phenomenon to seeing spark-lights from a cat stroked against the grain in the dark, and conjectures something similar can happen with birds' wings.

There are legends that night herons which attain a certain old age become enchanted like the kitsune fox or tanuki raccoon dog. Such legends may have emerged from the sheer creepiness of the nocturnal night heron crying loudly and flying in the night sky. There are fanciful tales of night herons developing pectoral scales, scattering yellowish powders, thus emitting blue-white light while flying in the clouded sky around autumn time.

One plausible scientific explanation is that certain bacteria may attach themselves to a waterfowl's body, and glow under moonlight. Or white tufts of feather on the night heron's breast may appear to glow when seen in the dark.

As for species identification, even if the story of the uba-ga-bi in Shokoku rijindan or the Mimibukuro rumor uses the bird name goisagi, this does not necessarily mean precisely that species (according to modern common name conventions) had been meant, observes Teiri Nakamura. And while the said uba-ga-bi was stated as being a chicken-like fowl, the beak-battering behavior suggests not night heron but a crane, in Minakata Kumagusu's opinion expressed in a letter.

== Azuma kagami ==
Azuma kagami's entry for 14th day of 6th month of Kenchō 8 (7 July 1256 in the Julian calendar）reports a hikarimono seen, more than 5 shaku (feet) in size that first look like a "white heron" (egret) then was like red fire, leaving a trail like white cloth being pulled. It was seen not only in Kamakura but from neighboring provinces as well. It states this was a type never seen in Japan. The Koji ruien classifies this as a celestial (astral) event, alongside the giant 44 shaku (feet) meteor of Shōka 2/1258. (Note: From around the second month of Kenchō 8 into Shōgen era (1256-1260) a series of natural omens and cataclysms occurred, such as violent storms, giant meteor/meteor showers, as well as eruptions of famine and epidemics.)

== Fictional works ==
The kaidan novelist Kyōka Izumi wrote two related short stories under the titles "Sagi no tomoshibi (鷺の灯)" and "Aosagi", collected in Kōya hijiri. Natsuhiko Kyogoku has written "Goi no hikari" collected inNochi kōsetsu hyakumonogatari.
