= Take no yuki =

Classical Japanese play by Zeami Motokiyo

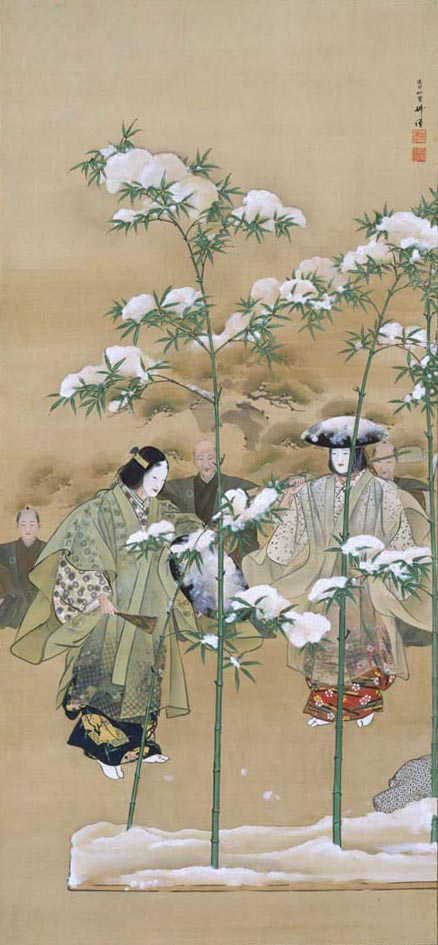
Painting depicting a scene from the play by Kōgyo Tsukioka, colour on silk (1906) (Tokyo National Museum)

Take no Yuki (竹雪, Snow on the Bamboos) is a Noh play by Zeami Motokiyo.

== Theme ==
A man separates from his first wife and his daughter, but keeps his son with his second wife, who is urged by him to look after both the boy and the bamboo grove while he is on pilgrimage. Suspecting the son has complained of her to his actual parents, the stepmother sends him out, coatless, to brush the winter snow off the bamboos.

After the boy dies of exposure in the bamboo grove, his sister and mother sing a song of despair, before the pious reconciliation of father and mother brings the dead boy back to life at the close.

== Later allusions ==
- In a haiku offered to a family who had lost their own child, Bashō alludes to the Noh play: “Withered and bending / Dejected world upside-down / Bamboo of the snow”
- Prints based on the play's story were not uncommon.

== See also ==
- Torioi(bune)
- Wicked stepmother
- Yuki-onna
