= Tsurara-onna =

Japanese folk tale

Tsurara-onna (つらら女, "icicle woman") is a Japanese folktale about an icicle that became a woman, so it is often confused with yuki-onna.

== Summary ==
A single man was looking at the icicles hanging under the eaves of his home and sighed saying "I'd like a wife as beautiful as these icicles," and just as he wished, a beautiful woman appeared who wanted to be his wife. This woman was an incarnation of an icicle, and there are variations on how this plays out.

Aomori Prefecture, Niigata Prefecture, and Tōhoku region
They are also called shigama-nyōbō or tsurara-nyōbō (氷柱女房). The woman and man became husband and wife, but for some reason the woman was reluctant to go in a bath. The man made the woman go into the bath, but the woman would not come out of the bath even after a while. Out of worry, the man peeked into the bathroom, but there was no sight of the woman, only fragments of ice floating in the bathtub.
Akita Prefecture
It has similarities to the above, but only the Akita version is not a story about a woman appearing to a man and wishing to marry.
On a night of great snow, a woman came to visit the house of a couple, and requested to have lodging. The couple kindly granted this.
Several days continued of snow that was too heavy for anyone to go outside, so the woman continued staying at that house. The couple tried to be considerate by warming the bath, but the woman did not want to go in at all. However, unable to completely refuse the couple's recommendation, the woman sorrowfully went into the bath. After that, the woman wouldn't come out of the bath even after a while.
The couple was worried, and when they peeked into the bath, there was no sight of the woman, only a single icicle hanging from the roof.
Other
The woman who suddenly appeared married the man, but when spring came, the woman disappeared. The man felt sad thinking that the woman ran away from him, but within a year married another woman.
Another winter came. The woman came to the man once again. The woman became so angry that the man married again, that the woman turned her appearance into that of an icicle and stabbed him to death.

== Similar folktales ==
In many places, there are similar folktales about how a single man charmed by the beauty of icicles would have a woman suddenly appear wishing to be his wife who in the end was actually an icicle, and how those stories play out in the end differ.

Echigo Province (now Niigata Prefecture)―"Kanekori-jorō"
The woman who suddenly appeared married the man, but when spring came, the woman disappeared. The man felt sad thinking that the woman ran away from him, but unable to bear the disadvantages of living alone, he married another woman.
Another winter came. There was a large icicle hanging under the eaves. The man said it was an obstruction to movement, so he went to break off the icicle. The wife that was in the house heard the man's scream. Out of surprise, she went outside and found the man impaled to death through the neck by an icicle.

Yamagata Prefecture―"Suga-jorō"
It was during a marriage ceremony. The woman went to the kitchen to warm some alcohol, but wouldn't return after a while. Unable to wait any longer, the man went to the kitchen but did not see a woman there, only a soaked kimono. The woman incarnation of an icicle was melted by the heat of the kitchen.
