= Torioi(bune) =

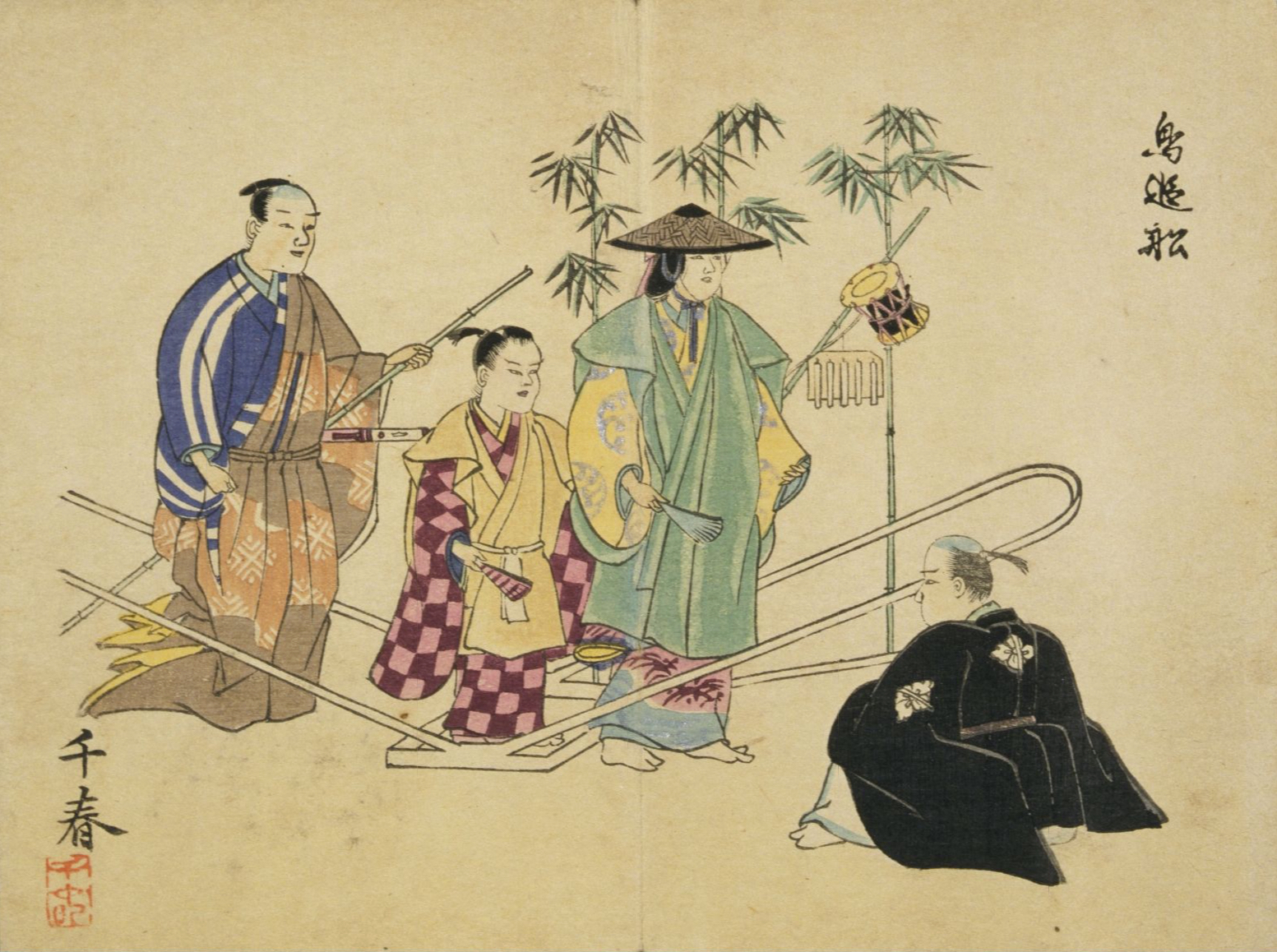
Scene from Torioi-bune by Takashima Chiharu

Torioi (鳥追, Bird-scaring) or Torioi-bune (鳥追舟, The Bird-scaring Boat) is a Noh play of the fourth category, probably from the 16th century, and possibly by Kongō Yagorō.

== Theme ==
An absentee husband and father sets in motion a chain of events whereby the steward left in charge of the family estate gradually exerts power over the mother and her son, Hanawaka.

Eventually the pair are forced into the demeaning activity of bird-scaring from a boat among the ricefields.

== See also ==
- Take no yuki
