= Ubume =

Japanese yōkai of pregnant women

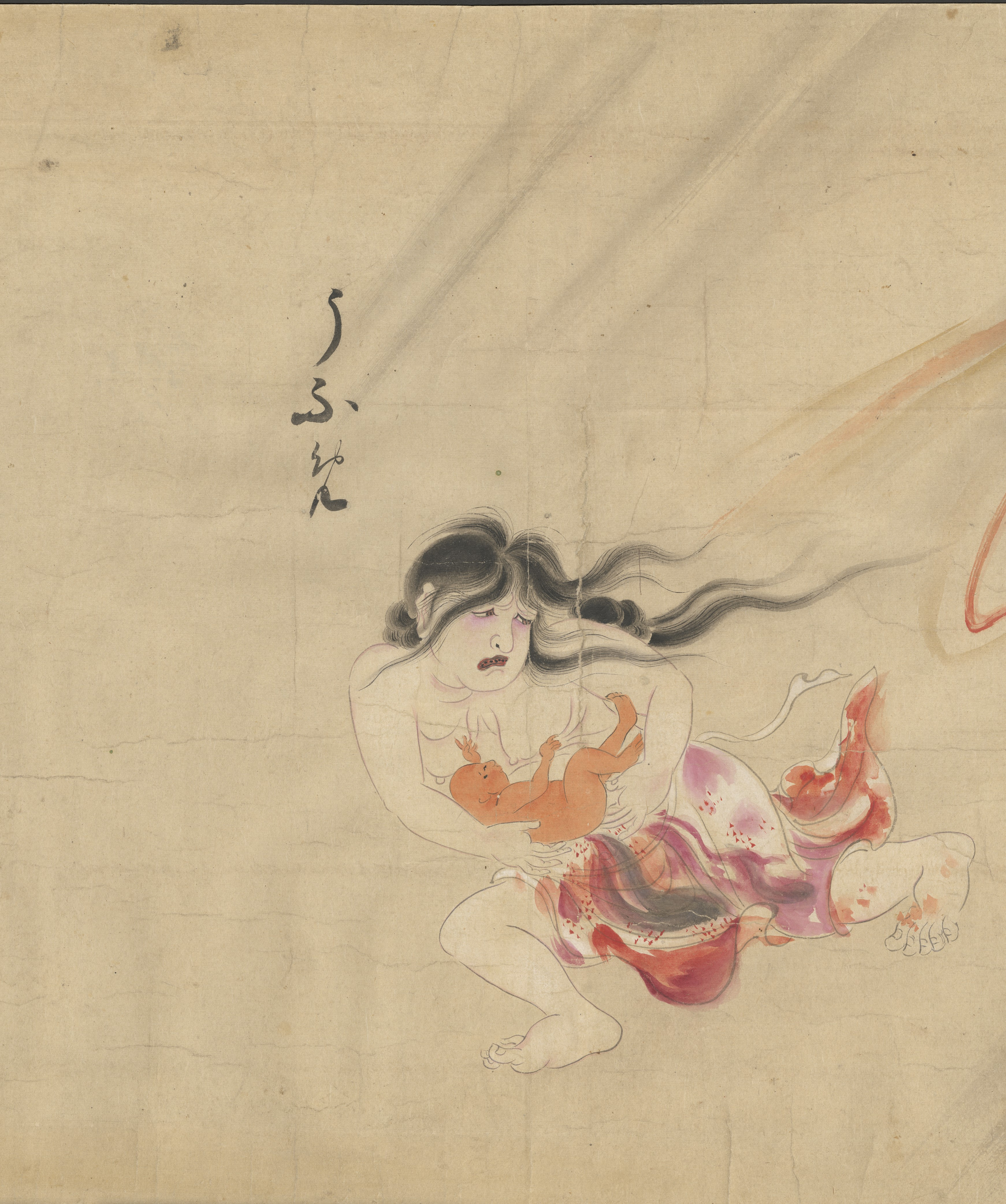
Ubume (うぶめ) from Bakemono no e picture scroll (c. 1660). —Harry F. Bruning Collection of Japanese Books and Manuscripts, L. Tom Perry Special Collections, Harold B. Lee Library, Brigham Young University.

Ubume (Japanese: 産女) (also ubumedori (姑獲鳥) or ubumetori (産女鳥)) are Japanese yōkai, ghosts of women who died in childbirth, but may have borne a child alive.

The creature is equivalent to the Chinese Guhuoniao (Chinese: 姑獲鳥, "wench bird") but local Japanese folklore has been blended into the legend.

Throughout folk stories and literature the identity and appearance of ubume varies. However, she is most commonly depicted as the spirit of a woman who has died during childbirth. Passersby will see her as a normal-looking woman carrying a baby. She will typically try to give the passerby her child then disappears. When the person examines the child in his arm, he discovers it to be a bundle of leaves or large rock.

== Nomenclature ==
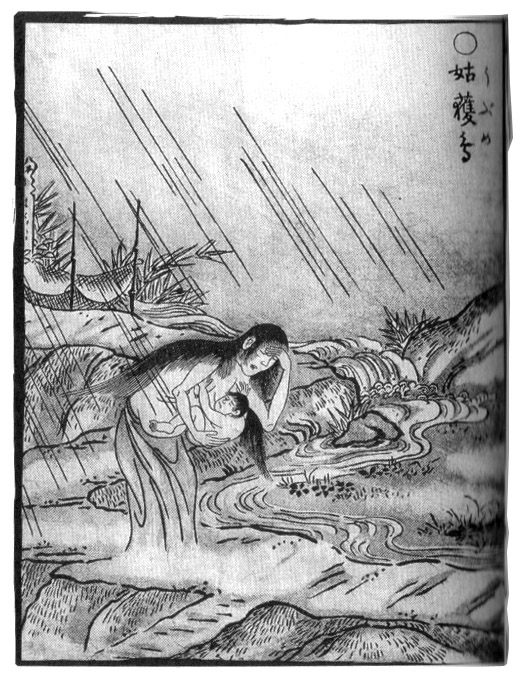
Ubume (姑獲鳥), wood-block print, by Toriyama Sekien, Gazu hyakki yagyō (first pub. 1776)

The ubume (産女, 姑獲) of Japanese lore was considered the equivalent of the Chinese guhuoniao (姑獲鳥; pinyin: gū huò niǎo, lit. "lady capturing-bird", translated as "wench bird") (Note: Chinese pronunciation transliterated tōfūniao (タウフウニャウ) (or rather correctly kūfūniao (クウフウニャウ)) in Wakan Sansai Zue. Cf. the Chinese borrowed term kūnyan (姑娘/クーニャン) for a 'Chinese girl' has been in use in Japan.), alias rumu niao (乳母鳥; 'mother's milk bird' (Note: Here 'mother's milk bird' is Unschuld's rendering from the Chinese. Note that 乳母 signifies "wetnurse" both in Chinese and Japanese, and the sense of 'wetnurse bird' is clear in the explanation of nyūbochō (from Kii zōdan shū) below.)) or yèxíng yóunǚ (夜行遊女; lit. 'nighttime travelling girl') (Note: The Bencao Gangmu, under the entry 49.28 for "Gu huo niao" lists Ru mu niao (乳母鳥) and Ye xing you nu as synonyms, attested in the Xuanzhong ji, edited by Guo Pu AD 276–324, Jin dynasty (266–420).) (Note: It is stated in the BCGM that "they [the wench birds] are transformations of women who died giving birth" which is also stated with slightly different phrasing (Chinese: 或言産死者所化) in the Miscellaneous Morsels from Youyang from the Tang dynasty.) —as well-explained in various pieces of Edo period scholarship.

Due to the ubume being equated with or conflated with the Chinese version, the Chinese written name 姑獲鳥 (Note: This can also be pronounced Chinese-style (read as on'yomi) as kōwakuchō (コウワクテウ).) has been coopted to be read as ubume or "ubumedori". (Note: It was Hayashi Razan (1631) who was first to do so) (Note: This sort of application, where it is not possible to read it as such phonetically, is called ateji. If it can be read phonetically Japanese-style, it is simply kunyomi.)

An alternate kanji representation gives it the meaning of 産女 (ubume, (Note: Although 産 is typically pronounced umu, it can also be ubu as in the compound ubu goe ("baby's cry at birth").) "birthing woman"). (Note: From Kii zōdan shū (『奇異雑談集』). Book 4, (4) "Ubume yurai no koto 産女の由来の事", fol. 7b–8a: "唐に姑獲（こくわく）といふは、日本の產女なり、姑獲は鳥なり..[quote from Bencao Gangmu].. 是は、人の子を、とつて、我子として、乳を、のませてやしなふ事、人の乳母（めのと）に似たるゆへに、乳母鳥[（にうほてう）]と、いふなり是ハ、婦人、子なふ（無く）して、子をほしがるもの、たま〳 〵くはいにん（懐妊）す、と、いへども、産することを、えず、難産に死するときんバ（時は）、その執心魂魄、変化して、鳥となりて、夜とびまはりて人の小子を、とる.." (in Japanese))

Supposedly also called nyūbochō (乳母鳥; "mother's milk bird"), (Note: The straight reading of the source is nyūhochō (乳母鳥/にうほてう) but in older literature, dakuten is routinely omitted, thus transcribed "ほ ho" instead of "ぼ bo"; therefore the corrected reading of nyūbochō (乳母鳥/にうぼてう) ahs been given, as per a more modern reference.) due to its resemblance to a wetnurse (menoto (乳母)). (Note: menoto (乳母/めのと) is obsolete, and the modern reading of 乳母 in Japanese is uba, synonymous with ubame (乳母女). However, Edo-period source here, the Kii zōdan shū, reads the bird as nyūbochō not ubame-dori.)

== General description ==
The ubume is explained to be the ghost of a mother who died giving childbirth, i.e., a "birthing woman ghost". When a pregnant woman dies without delivering her child, and is buried, but the child still comes out alive, her soul (konpaku (魂魄), i.e. hun and po) turns into this monstrous female, soaked in blood below the waist and frail-like, asking passersby to hold her baby, and if the person complies he gains some sort of a boon (e.g. extraordinary strength), according to a certain source (cf. § Kii zōdan shū of 1687 below). (Note: From Kii zōdan shū (『奇異雑談集』). Book 4, (4) "Ubume yurai no koto 産女の由来の事", fol. 7a–7b: "世俗にいわく、懐妊不産（はらみてうまず）して死せる者、そのまま野捨てにすれば胎内の子死せずして野にて生まるれば、母の魂魄、形に化して、子を抱き養うて夜行く。その赤子の泣くをうぶめ啼くというなり。その形腰より下は血に浸って力弱きなり。人もしこれに遭えば負うてたまわれと言うを、厭わずして負えば人を福祐になすと言い伝えたり、云々") (Note: Morihiko Fujisawa, even though he uses quotation marks, is actually paraphrasing the earlier portion of the chapter from this work (Kii zōdan shū): "産婦の分娩せずして胎児になほ生命あらば、母の妄執は為に残つて、変化のものとなり、子を抱きて夜行く。その赤子の泣くを、うぶめ啼くといふ ", but Fujisawa interjects the term mōshū (妄執; 'delusional obsession'), which matches the term shūshin (執心; ' obsession in the mind') in the passage quoted below.) If the passerby refuses and flees, he may be cursed and develop a fever, even unto death. (Note: Wakan sansai zue (in Sinetic kanbun), written out into Japanese by Munakata (close paraphrase).)

But typically in folk narratives, the ubume asks a passerby to hold her child for just a moment and disappears when her victim takes the swaddled baby. The baby then becomes steadily heavier, (even heavier than stone (Note: Or, in a Yamagata Prefecture variant, "as if being made to carry a 100-kan stone".)) until it is impossible to hold. It is then revealed not to be a human child at all, but a boulder or a stone image of Jizō, a stone tower (stupa), or tree leaves.

She has been depicted wearing blood-stained loincloth (koshimaki) by various Edo-period artists (Note: Sawaki Sūshi Hyakkai zukan, Toriyama Sekien Gazu hyakki yagyō, etc.) (cf. § In art), as according to folk tradition. (Note: Fujisawa (1925), p. 58 and (1955), p. 122)

She is also said to try to snatch other people's baby out of craving to have a child of her own. Or she may have borne the child alive, and the ghost mother seeks out nourishment for the bereft or orphaned child.

It also has the habit that of trying to breastfeed (Note: As per Chinese sources explaining the bird has "breasts/teats") the child it kidnaps, leading to its alias name nyūbochō (乳母鳥; "mother's milk bird"), as aforementioned.

Another piece of lore is that the ubume tends to leave droplets of blood on clothing when it intrudes into a household, and this should be taken as a sign of its presence (Note: From Kii zōdan shū (『奇異雑談集』). Book 4, (4) "Ubume yurai no koto 産女の由来の事", fol. 8a–8b: "姑獲鳥、夜、隱飛し、人の家に行きて、子をたづぬるに、小児の衣（きぬ）、夜、外に置くときは、その衣にふるゝゆえに、姑獲の血、その衣に点ずるなり。これをみて、姑獲のきたるしるしと、するなり...日本にも、小児の衣を、夜、外にほすことを、いむは、此儀なり". Also quoted secondhand via Matsuya hikki 松屋筆記 Book 1, 22.) (Cf. § Local lore from Ibaraki that the bird marks the child's clothing with its poison milk).

As for further details regarding the immense strength that can be obtained from the ubume, there are narratives where the newly gifted person washed his face and wrung dry the towel, it ruptured into two pieces, and even four pieces, making him realize he has been endowed with strength. The man later succeeded as a powerful sumo wrestler.

== Attestations ==
=== Konjaku monogatarishū ===
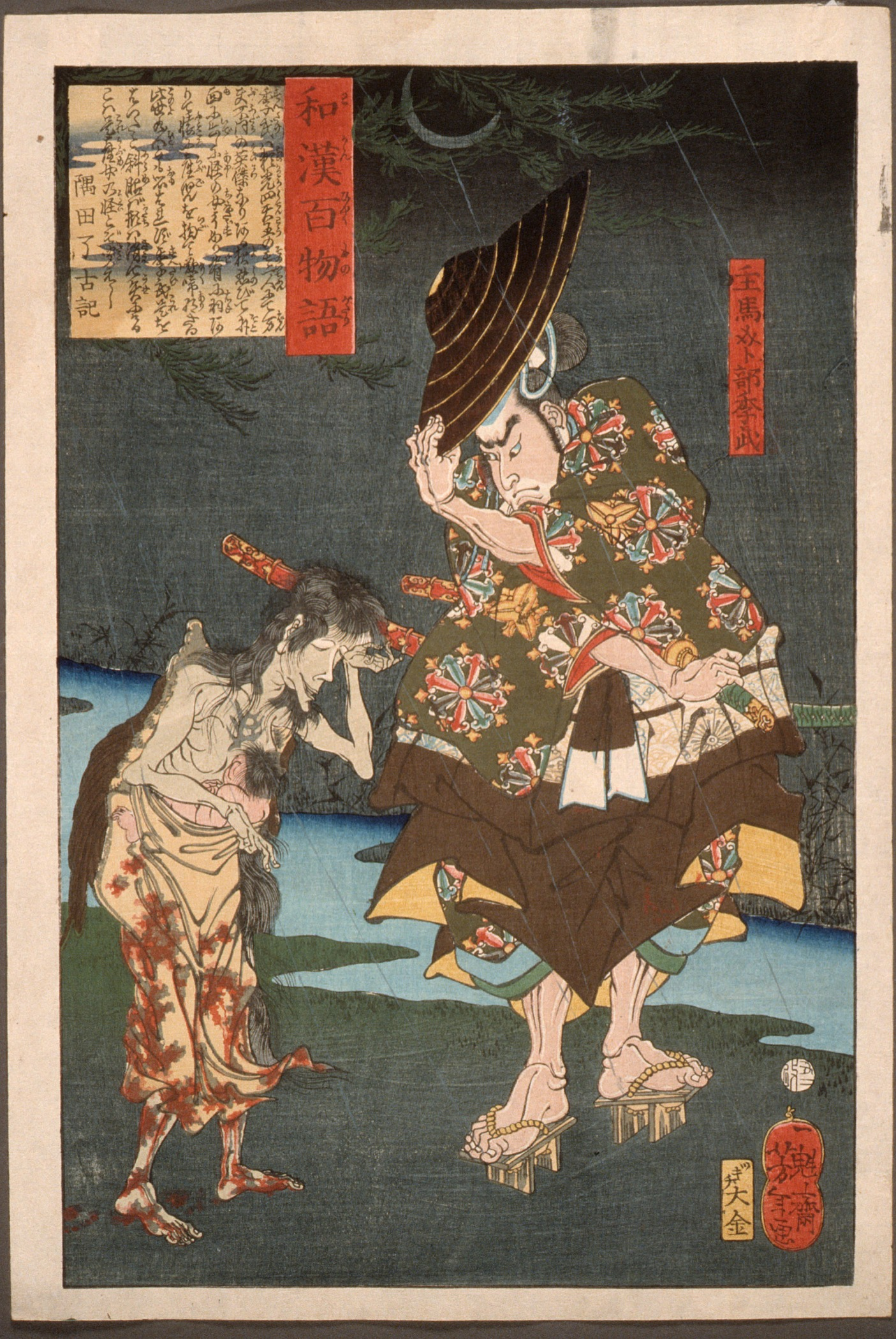
"Suma Urabe Suetake meeting a Ghost with a Child" — LACMA M.84.31.54

Stories about ubume have been told in Japan since at least the 12th century, in the Konjaku Monogatarishū, where a samurai (Urabe no Suetake (Note: Given as "Taira-no-Suetake" during the time when Minamoto no Raikō was lord governor of Mino Province, in the Japanese text.), cf. image right) encounters a woman (ubume (産女)) at the riverbank who asks him to hold her child. She demands her child back and when the samurai refused, it turned into a bundle of leaves.

=== Kokon hyakumonogatari hyōban ===
They are also mentioned in the Hyakumonogatari Hyōban: "When a woman loses her life in childbirth, her spiritual attachment (Note: Given as shūjaku, now normally 執着 is read shūchaku. Cf. "obsessed" in the quote from Kii Zōdan Shū below.) itself becomes this ghost. In form, it is soaked in blood from the waist down and wanders about crying, 'Be born! Be born!' (obareu, obareu; をばれう)".

=== Kii zōdan shū ===
The Kii zōdan shū ("Collected yarns of the uncanny"; pub. Jōkyō4/1687) was already drawn on above to provide the general description that if a woman who dies in labor but produces a live child after internment, her soul transmogrifies into the ubume. The same work returns somewhat later to explain that when "a woman wanting a child (for a long time) gets pregnant by chance, but dies in difficult labor or delivery, her obsession or double-soul (kon and haku) transforms into the shape of a bird, flies by night, and captures other people's children". It has been stressed that it is the obsession (obsessed soul) that transforms into this being, and that a similar description also occurs in the Kokon hyakumonogatari hyōban (above).

This work also provides the aforementioned lore about the breasted bird having cravings to breastfeed the child it abducts, and how the bird flies by at night and leaves blood stains on children's clothing, leading to the taboo against leaving clothes hung out to dry overnight.

=== Wakan sansai zue ===
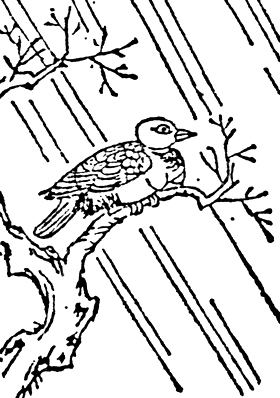
Kokakuchō/Kowakuchō (姑獲鳥) or yagyō yūjo (夜行遊女), "nighttime travelling girl" (Note: "nighttime travelling girl" as rendered by Unschuld from the Chinese (BCGM). The character "遊" denotes "travel" but usually means "play" in Japanese, and "遊女" is easily taken to mean "prostitue".)) from the Wakan Sansai Zue by Terajima Ryōan

The encyclopedia records that according to the local legend the ubumedori appears on the seashores of the westerly parts of Japan, and the people of Kyushu describe it as resembling a large gull in appearance and voice, appearing usually on a pitch-black night of light rain. The spot where the bird appears, there is usually "phosphor fire" (eerie flame, like a will-o'-the-wisp). It is said to shapeshift into a human woman with a baby, and whoever encounters this creature will ask a passerby to hold her child; (Note: Minakata assumingly renders this as "carry the infant on his back", i.e., onbu, but this is not clarified in the original text which only says she "begs to bear/carry (請負)" it. Commentary on the ubume usually describes her as trying to make strangers daku (抱く; 'hold') the child.) he should beware of fleeing from fright, lest the creature will cause chill-shivers and high fever, which can even be fatal. However, if a stalwart man accepts the favor and carries the child, he will come to no harm. (Note: Wakan sansai zue (in kanbun text), expanded into ordinary Japanese by Minakata, and also translated by him into English.)

=== Gazu hyakki yagyō ===
Toriyama Sekien's encyclopedia of ghosts, goblins, and ghouls, Gazu hyakki yagyō (An'ei5/1776) includes and illustrated entry for "ubume (姑獲鳥)".

This is perhaps the most famous depiction of ubume, but no text is provided beyond the title. The ubume stands by a river holding a child, topless, but clad in blood-stained sheet from the waist below (cf. image above right and § In art for further details including symbolisms).

=== Kaga sōdō jikki ===
An ominous shrieking creepy bird was dubbed ubumedori in Kanazawa, (now in Ishikawa prefecture), and connected with the so-called Kaga sōdō, the scandalous affairs of the Kaga Domain involving accusations of adultery and murder plots. After the death of the lady Shinnyo-in who was implicated in the affair, ominous bird-screeches were heard, and signs of some creature stirring in the mansion. An archer was sent to hunt it, and a heron-like but unfamiliar strange bird was caught. The omnious screeches were heard throughout the city, and the culprit dubbed Ubume-dori (憂婦女鳥). The bird no longer appeared after the city suffered the great fire. This item is recorded in the Kaga sōdō jikki or the "true chronicle" of the affair (of which there are variant copies with different titles).

=== Local lore ===
In Ibaraki Prefecture, there is a similar legend concerning a yōkai called the ubametori (Note: Whiles some sources only give ubametori phonetically in kana as "ウバメトリ", Aramata assigns the kanji "姑獲鳥 (ウバメトリ)") which flies by night, and when it spots children's clothing hung dry, it imagines would think of the child as their own, and mark the clothes with its milk, which is said to be poisonous.

This "ubametori" of Ibaraki bears close similarity with the kokakuchō i.e. guhuoniao the "wench bird" of China, and the folklore probably derives from Chinese scholarship, introduced by some Japanese person with learning.

=== By other names ===
Ubume in Hinoemata, Minamiaizu District and Kaneyama, Ōnuma District, Fukushima Prefecture were called "obo". It is said that when they encounter someone, they make that person hug a baby and then disappear in peace and the one hugging the baby will have their throat bitten by the baby. It is said that when one encounters an obo, one should throw a piece of cloth at it, such as a string with a billhook attached in the case of men, or an okōso [zukin] (御高祖[頭巾]; type of headdress or hood), tenugui, or a yumaki (waistcloth} in the case of women, thus diverting the obo's attention for a chance to escape. It is also said that if one does end up holding the baby, hugging the baby with its face turned the other way will prevent one from being bitten.

Also, the obo (like "ubu" in "ubume" ) was originally a dialect term referring to newborns. In Yanaizu, Kawanuma District in the same Fukushima Prefecture, there is a legend concerning the obo daki kannnon (おぼ抱き観音; "obo hugging Kannon") who asked a man to hold her child (obo) while she did her hair, and after he complied, he received a stack of mochi made of gold as reward.

In the Nishimatsuura District, Saga Prefecture and in Miyamachi Miyaji, Aso, Kumamoto Prefecture, they are called "ugume" and it is said that they appear at night and they would make people embrace a baby a night, but when dawn comes, they would generally be a rock, a stone tower, or a straw beater. (A type of funayūrei ("ship ghost") called "ugume" is known on Goshoura Island in Kumamoto Prefecture, as well as Ojika Island, one of the Gotō Islands, in Nagasaki Prefecture).

On Iki Island (Nagasaki Prefecture), they are called "unme" or "uume" and they occur when a young person dies or when a woman dies from difficult childbirth, and they would sway back and forth before disappearing, having the appearance of a creepy blue light.

In Iwaki Province, now Fukushima Prefecture and Miyagi Prefecture, it is said that the ryūtō ("dragon lantern"; an atmospheric ghost light said to be lit by a dragon spirit) would appear at beaches and try to come up to land, but it is said that this is because an ubume is carrying a ryūtō to the shore. In Kitaazumi District, Nagano Prefecture, ubume are called yagomedori, and they are said to stop at clothes drying at night, and it is said that putting on those clothes would result in dying before one's husband.

== Folkloristics ==
Many scholars have associated the ubume with the legend of the hitobashira ('human pillar'), where a sacrificial mother and child "are buried under one of the supporting pillars of a new bridge".

Minkata Kumagus (1915) draws comparison to the ubumedori of Kyushu accompanied by phosphorescent light, as described in the Wakan sansai zue, and the folkloric strange phenomenon of aosagi-no-hi ("heron's fire"). He remarks that Hayashi Ranzan (1583-1657) in Baison zaihitsu (梅村載筆) has recorded an anecdote of a man who spied on the alleged ubume that issued babylike cries in the night, but it turned out to be nothing more than a "blue heron" (aosagi).

The Shōshin'in Temple (正信院) in Shizuoka Prefecture, according to scholars, is where local women come to pray to conceive a child or to have a successful pregnancy. According to Stone and Walter (2008), the origins of the temple's legend, set in the mid-16th century, concern:

a modern statue of Ubume, displayed once a year in July. At this festival, candy that has been offered to the image is distributed, and women pray for safe delivery and for abundant milk. The statue, which is clothed in white robes, has only a head, torso, and arms; it has no lower half.

In narratives exhibiting the strength-gaining motif (cf. the man who becomes sumo wrestler, above), folklorist Noboru Miyata explains that the dead mother who becomes an ubume holds a powerful grudge, wishing to restore a strong child back into the world, and while she does have the extraordinary supernatural energy for trying to "deliver" a dead child back into the world, it only succeeds in a twisted way, and manifests itself instead as the endowment of great strength on a cooperator.

=== Superstitious customs ===
There are certain superstitions and rituals relating to the ubume. It was believed that when a pregnant woman dies prepartum, she and the fetus must be buried separately in order to prevent the ubume from materializing. The gruesome practice of slitting a dead pregnant woman's belly open to remove the fetus for mi futastu (身二つ; lit. 'bodies twain', 'separating the bodies') was practiced in wide areas in early modern Japan, and remained in practice into the 19th and even early 20th century in rural parts. In some parts of the Tohoku region, after the fetus is separated, the cremated bones would be buried together, but with three straw doll, or the

Sometimes, one or several straw dolls would have been crafted to be buried with the mother and child who had either undergone the postmortem separation, or the doll may be used in lieu of performing the mi futatsu. (Note: The mi futatsu is performed and the remains buried with a straw doll dressed in deceased's outfit (Enoshima, Oshika, Miyagi; a doll is placed with the burial without performing the mi futatsu Shizugawa, Miyagi. A straw doll would be added to make it nominally into a burial of three people (Niigata Prefecture). Three dolls crafted, and the cremated bones of mother and child with the dolls would be interred as 3 people (Minamimachi, Namamugi, Kanagawa).)

The idea that a pregnant woman who dies and get buried transforms into an ubume has existed since ancient times; which is why it has been said that , one ought to cut the fetus out the abdomen and put it on the mother in a hug as they are buried. In some regions, if the fetus cannot be cut out, a doll would be put beside her.

The ubume's blood-soaked appearance may also be connected with the Buddhist notion that women who died while pregnant were believed to fall into a hell with a pond of blood, and the stigma of uncleanliness was attached to this Therefore, there was even a certain cleansing ritual called nagare kanjō (流灌頂; 'flowing anointment') that takes place by a river after a mother died in childbirth. A small piece of cloth is stretched across four waist-high poles, and the bereaved as well as passersby cast water at the cloth scooped up with a ladle.

== In art ==
Tokugawa-era artists produced many images of ubume, usually represented as "naked from the waist up, wearing a red skirt and carrying a small baby", or rather, wearing a blood-soaked koshimaki loincloth.

Sawaki Sūshi Hyakkai zukan (Genbun] 2/1737) is a picture scroll featuring "Ubume" as one of its yōkai; the postscript to the scroll professes that it was copied from the original painted by Kanō Motonobu (1476–1559). Another illustration of ubume comes from Toriyama Sekien's Gazu hyakki yagyō (An'ei 5/1776). Sekien too admits he consulted Kanō Motonobu's Hyakki yagyō. (Note: It remains unclear if Kanō Motonobu actually created such a work entitled Hyakki yagyō.).

Joly offers as example the "Nissaka-shuku" by Kuniyoshi in Tōkaidō gojūsantsui, however, the inscription does not explicitly mention ubume. A woman is killed by a bandit, but she being devout in prayer, the Kwannon goddess assumes the guise of a monk and keeps the baby alive by feeding it ame (probably mizuame, or malt syrup), and the woman is able to appear before her husband to tell the story and entrust the baby at a yonaki ishi (somewhere near the Nissaka station).

=== Analysis of art ===
Sekien situates his ubume wrapped in a white sheet stained with blood from the waist below, standing on a narrow path next to a river. White symbolizes death in Japan (the deceased is dressed in white garb), while the blood may represent birth.

It is noted in connection with the ubume that water is symbolic of both miscarriages, called ryūzan (流産; lit. 'washed-away birth') and the stillborn child, called mizuko (水子; lit. 'water baby'). Another water symbolism in Sekien's use of river in the background is the allusion to the Buddhist concept of the Sanzu River, a river that must be crossed by the dead on the way to afterlife. (Note: Also, innocent children who died young are bound for a sort of purgatory called Sai no Kawara (賽の河原; "River-plain of the Dead"), conceived of being a pebbled riverbank by the Sanzu River of the underworld. Cf. Yasui (2020), Fig. 10.) (Note: Yasui also comments on the aforementioned nagare kanjō (流灌頂; 'flowing anointment') that takes place near the river in connection with Sekien's composition of the ubume by the river.)

== In popular literature ==
Natsuhiko Kyogoku's best-selling detective novel, The Summer of the Ubume, uses the ubume legend as its central motif, creating something of an ubume 'craze'. at the time of its publication and was made into a major motion picture in 2005.

== See also ==
- Harpy – Half-bird half-woman monsters associated with storm winds
- Kenas-unarpe – Ainu mountain hag or monstrous bird
- Konaki-jiji – A childlike yōkai that, like the ubume's bundled 'infant', grows heavier when carried and ultimately takes the form of a boulder.
- Momo Challenge hoax – Originating from a sculpture of a ubume
- Myling – An example of a similar motif in Scandinavian folklore.
- Pontianak – Mythological creature
- Sankai – Yōkai that emerge from pregnant women
- Strigoi – Etymologically related to strix
- Strix (mythology) – Roman mythical owl that drizzles milk on an infant's lip, or blood-sucks and devours it.

== Citations ==
=== References ===
- Fujisawa, Morihiko [in Japanese] (1925). "Yukionna densetsu kō" 雪女伝説考. Nihon densetsu kenkyū 日本伝説研究. Vol. 2. Daitokaku. pp. 49–66. ndljp:972232.
- Glassman, Hank (2001). The religious construction of motherhood in medieval Japan. Stanford University.
- Glassman, Hank (2008). "5. At the Crossroads of Birth and Death: The Blood Pool hell and Postmortem Fetal Extraction". In Stone, Jacqueline Ilyse; Walter, Mariko Namba (eds.). Death and the afterlife in Japanese Buddhism. University of Hawaii Press. pp. 175–206. ISBN 9780824832049.
- Joly, Henri L. (1908). Legend in Japanese art: a description of historical episodes, legendary characters, folklore, myths, religious symbolism, illustrated in the arts of old Japan. Vol. 2. J. Lane.
- Miyata, Noboru [in Japanese] (1990). Yōkai no minzokugaku: Nihon no mienai kūkan 妖怪の民俗学・日本の見えない空間. Iwanami Shoten. ISBN 9784002600529. (Reprint: 2002 Chikuma gakugei bunko edition ISBN 978-4-480-08699-0)
- Mozume, Takami [in Japanese], ed. (1922). "Ubumetdori" うぶめどり（姑獲鳥）. Kōbunko 広文庫 (in Japanese). Vol. 3. Kōbunko Kankōkai. pp. 645–648.
- Yasui, Manami [in Japanese] (April 2003). "Taiji bunri maisō no shūzoku to shussan wo meguru kaii no fōkuroa: sono seisei to shōmetsu ni kansuru kōsatsu" 「胎児分離」埋葬の習俗と出産をめぐる怪異のフォークロア: その生成と消滅に関する考察. In Komatsu, Kazuhiko [in Japanese] (ed.). Nihon yōkaigaku taizen 日本妖怪学大全 (in Japanese). Shogakukan. pp. 479–509. ISBN 978-4-09-626208-5.
- Yasui, Manami [in Japanese] (2020). "Imagining the Spirits of Deceased Pregnant Women : An Analysis of Illustrations of Ubume in Early Modern Japan" (PDF). Japan Review : Journal of the International Research Center for Japanese Studies. 35: 91–112. doi:10.15055/00007603.
