= Koji Ruien =

Japanese encyclopaedic work

The Koji Ruien (古事類苑) is a Japanese encyclopaedic work initiated by the Meiji government, and compiled from historical source documents. Over the period from 1896 to 1914, a total of 1,000 volumes were compiled, under various subject categories.
