= Sankai =

Yōkai

In Japanese mythology, a sankai (産怪, sankai; literally, "birth monster") is a yōkai (praeternatural creature) that is born to a woman. According to myth, when due care is not given during pregnancy, a sankai would emerge instead.

== Oketsu ==
The story of the oketsu (オケツ) comes from Okayama Prefecture. From outer appearance, it looks similar to a turtle, and it has hair growing on its back. As soon as it is born, it starts to crawl on the floor and attempts to escape underneath the house. If not captured and killed right away, it is said to crawl underneath the sleeping mother and kill her.

== Kekkai ==
The sankai is known as a kekkai (血塊, ケッカイ) in Saitama Prefecture and Kanagawa Prefecture, and kekke (ケッケ) in Nagano Prefecture. Legends about its outer appearance are sparse, however it is said to look like cattle and is said to be hairy. Kekkai is also said to bury under the house to kill its mother. In Urawa, a practice existed of surrounding the bottom of a house with byōbu during childbirth to prevent this maneuver. It is theorized that the etymology may derive from kekkai (結界), meaning an area restricted for religious reasons.

In the Ashigara region of Kanagawa Prefecture, the sankai is said to move immediately while still bloody, the jizaikagi of an irori, or hearth. If the kekkai successfully escapes, the woman was believed to die. In order to prevent this, someone would have to guard the irori, typically equipped with a shamoji.

Folklorist Iwao Hino recalls spotting a kekkai at a freak show during childhood. The show stated that it was given birth by a woman at a University hospital, however Hino later believed that it must have been a trained night monkey.

== See also ==
- Ubume, yōkai of a woman who died in childbirth
