= Ubagabi =

Legendary ghost

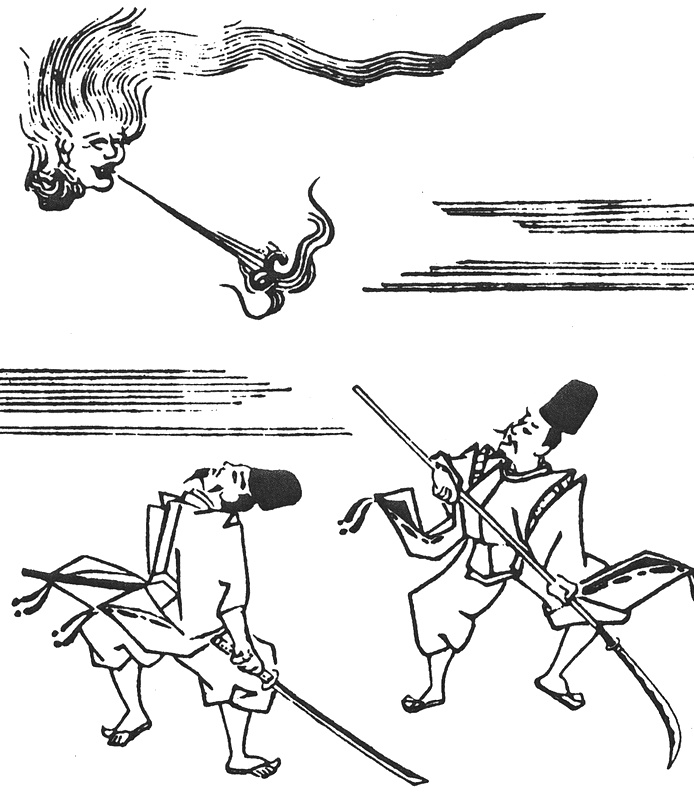
"Mi wo Sute Abura-tsubo" from the Saikaku Shokoku Banashi by Ihara Saikaku

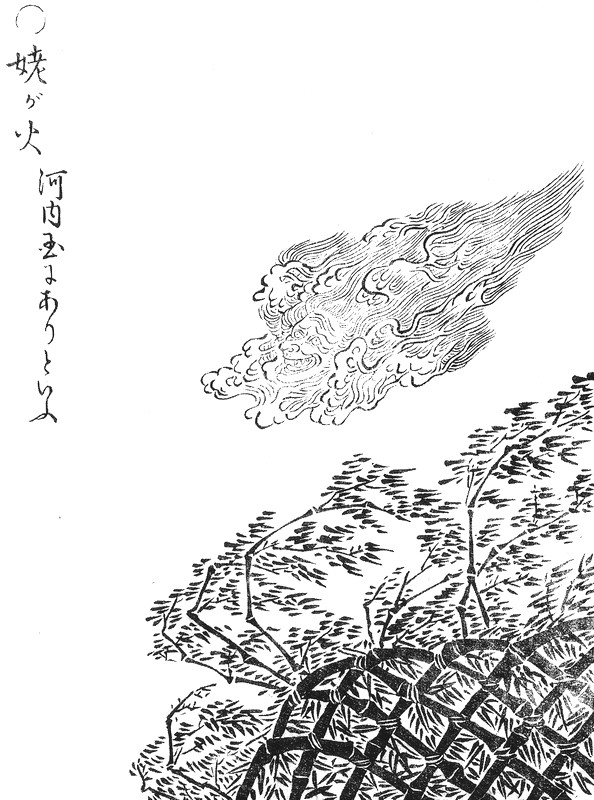
"Ubagabi" from the Gazu Hyakki Yagyō by Toriyama Sekien

The ubagabi (姥ヶ火 or 姥火, "old woman's fire") is an atmospheric ghost light in legends of Kawachi Province (now Osaka Prefecture) and Tanba Province (now northern Kyoto Prefecture). They are mentioned in old literature, such as the Tenpō period book the Shokoku Rijin Dan (諸国里人談) and Ihara Saikaku's collection of miscellaneous tales the Saikaku Shokoku Banashi (西鶴諸国ばなし) as well as Edo period kaidan books such as the Kokon Hyaku Monogatari Hyōban (古今百物語評判'), the Kawachi Kagami Meishōki (河内鑑名所記), and Toriyama Sekien's collection of yōkai depictions, the Gazu Hyakki Yagyō, among other mentions.

== Concept ==
According to the Shokoku Rijin Dan, on a rainy night, in Hiraoka, Kawachi (now Higashiōsaka, Osaka Prefecture), it would appear as a ball of fire with a length of one shaku (about 30 centimeters). It is said that in the past, an old woman stole oil from Hiraoka Shrine and became a mysterious fire from a resulting curse.

Once, when someone was walking along the road at night in Kawachi, the ubagabi suddenly appeared from nowhere and hit this person's face, and when this person looked closely, it took on the form of a chicken-like bird. It is said that when the ubagabi eventually flew away, it turned back into its original appearance as a ball of fire. From this, the yōkai manga artist Mizuki Shigeru suggested the possibility that the ubagabi was actually a bird.

In the tale where an old woman became an ubagabi, the Saikaku Shokoku Banashi, it is written about here as the "Mi wo Sute Abura-tsubo (the oil pot that threw away its body)." According to this, the ubagabi is said to fly a length of about one ri (about four kilometers) in a mere instant, and it is said when the ubagabi grazes around someone's shoulder, that person would die within three years. However, it is said that ubagabi would disappear if you say "abura-sashi" (meaning "oil pourer").

There is also a legend about an ubagabi appearing at the Hozu River in Kyoto Prefecture. In the Kokon Hyaku Monogatari Hyōban, there was once an old woman who lived near Kameyama (now Kameoka, Kyoto Prefecture) who would receive money from parents, telling them that she would take them to meet people they needed to see, and put the children into the Hozu River. Eventually, perhaps as divine punishment, the old woman experienced a flood and drowned. After that, it is said that a mysterious flame would appear near Hozu River, and people called this the ubagabi.

It is also titled "Ubagabi" (here written as 姥が火) in the Gazu Hyakki Yagyō, and it is depicted with an old woman's face within the mysterious flames, but since there is the statement "it's said to be in Kawachi Province" within accompanying description, this makes it a depiction of a Kawachi Province legend.

== See also ==
- List of legendary creatures from Japan
