= Guhuoniao =

Legendary bird from Chinese folklore

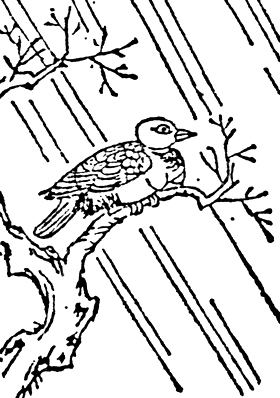
The ubumedori (姑獲鳥) or in Chinese transcription kūfū'nyau (クウ・フウ・ニャウ) ―Wakan sansai zue (Japanese encyclopedia completed 1712)

The Guhuo・niao (Chinese: 姑獲鳥, "wench bird") is a legendary bird from Chinese folklore.

It is described in such texts as the Western Jin natural history work Xuan Zhong Ji (玄中記, "Record of the Mysterious Center", 3-4th cent.), and consulted by the Ming period pharmacopoeia Bencao Gangmu (16th cent.) which collates information from various works.

== Nomenclature ==
The guhuoniao (姑獲鳥, "wench bird") (Note: [Ben Cao] Shi yi (739) of Chen Canqi (陳蔵器) apud Bencao Gangmu) has had several aliases, such as rumuniao (乳母鳥, "mother's milk bird", or in Japanese, ubadori "wetnurse bird"), yexing younu (夜行遊女; "nighttime traveling girl"), tiandi shaonu (天帝少女; "celestial emperor's young girl"), wuguniao (無辜鳥; "innocent bird"), yinfei (隠飛; "hidden flying"), Gou xing (鈎星; 鉤星; "hook star[?]"); (Note: All according to Xuan zhong ji (玄中記; "Record of the Mysterious Center"), cited by BCGM. BCGM actually lists Guo xing "hook star" citing Sui shi ji (荊楚歳時記), but this alias is also given by the "Record of the Mysterious Center".) gu niao (鬼鳥; "demon bird"), yi xi (譩譆). It later earned the additional name gu che (鬼車; "ghost cart").

== General description ==
The wench bird, according to the Bencao Gangmu, is a kind of demon-spirit (鬼神; guishen) that takes human lives, according to the "Record of the Mysterious Center". That is to say, it extracts the two types of human soul, the hun 魂 and po 魄, according to Chen Canqi (author of the [Ben Cao] Shi yi, 739). It can transform from bird to human woman by shedding its "hair" (or down, i.e., removing its feather garment). It is said to be the spirit of a woman who died giving birth to a child. Thus it has a pair of breasts (兩乳, i.e., mammaries or "teats") at the front of its chest (even while in bird form).

It has the habit of kidnapping infants to raise it as its own. It flies by night and marks the child with a drop of its blood. This will cause the child to fall ill and develop convulsions, in an illness condition called "innocent's gan" (無辜疳; wugugan, roughly translatable as "innocent's malnutrition" or "wasting-away" illness (Note: Note that Japanese dictionaries gloss 疳 (read kan) as "convulsion", and thus Japanese commentators interpret "innocent's gan" to be convulsion as well, which is of course redundant with xian (癇; "convulsion") already being mentioned. Thus for example the Tsūzoku bukkyō hyakkajiten (1892) states: Due to the ubumechō (姑獲鳥) the child develops kyōkan (驚癇; 'convulsion') which is called bukokan (無辜疳; 'innocent's kan').)). This infant casualty was purportedly frequent in Jingzhou, China.

The wench bird shares certain aspects with the bird maiden type women described in the Western Jin dynasty period work Sou shen ji (捜神記, In Search of the Supernatural, 4th cent.) who can transform back and forth from birds to women by donning or disrobing their "robe-hair" (衣毛, construed as "feather garment"). Added to this are aspects of the nuqi (女岐) of the Chu Ci (楚辭, "Songs of Chu") which steals other people's children. Thus the guhuoniao aka "wench bird" is thought to be a product of the fusion of several Chinese legends. The Tang period Youyang zazu (酉陽雜俎, Miscellaneous Morsels from Youyang) notes that the guhaoniao is a pregnant woman who died in childbirth and turned into a bird, (Note: "或言產死者所化") as also given in the Bencao Gangmu.

== Relation to Japanese folklore ==
The bird is also explained in the Edo Period Japan encyclopedia Wakan Sansai Zue as ubume dori (see top image). This entry (as many of its entries on other subjects) gives an extract from the Bencao gangmu account, followed by commentary on the ubume dori according to Japanese local legend and folklore. The encyclopedist's opinion is that there is no such thing as a woman turned bird, and this must be some bird species formed from the concentration of yin poison. In Japan, this ubume dori is supposedly a gull-like bird, with a similar bird-call, which frequents beaches in the West; it appears suddenly on a lightly raining dark night, and a strange phosphorescent fire will accompany wherever it shows, according to the residents of Kyūshū. It is said to transform into a woman with child, and beg humans to carry its child, but the timid who flee may incur its hatred and come down with shuddering chills and high fever that can be fatal. However a stalwart person who accepts the request to carry the child comes to no harm.

There is also a similar legend in Ibaraki Prefecture, where it is said that when a child's clothes is hung up to dry at night, a yokai called ubametori (ウバメトリ; or 姑獲鳥) would deem the child as her own, and mark its clothes with poison milk from the yokai's own breasts.

As for the borrowing of Chinese name guhaoniao for the equivalent Japanese lore of ubame or ubume, (Note: Conversely the Chinese version has been read as ubumechō (姑獲鳥)) one commentary is that the Chinese yaoguai and the Japanese yōkai got conflated in the early Edo period (17th century), while another commentator thinks the syncretism with Chinese lore was probably done deliberately by some intellectual privy to knowledge about the Chinese guhaoniao.

== Fauna identification ==
No ornithological identifications are given for this creature in Unschuld's translation proper for either "wench bird" or "demon chariot bird". and Li Shizhen insists these are different birds, (Note: Li Shizhen, under the entry for the "demon chariot bird" comments that the Jingchu Suishiji is wrong to equate the "demon chariot bird" with the "wench bird". Cf. also chapter 2, where there is an entry of "demon bird" as a word with two different meanings.) However, the companion dictionary to the Bencao Gangmu lists both guhuoniao and guicheniao (鬼車鳥, "demon chariot bird") as a "goatsucker" i.e nightjar. This concurs with the "goatsucker (nightjar)" identification previously given by Arthur Waley (1960). (Note: Waley, Arthur (1960) Ballads and stories from Tun-huang, p. 155 apud Hatto.)

The Japanese translation of the Bencao Gangmu has a marginal note offering ichthyologist Shigeru Kimura's conjecture that "wench bird" might be a bird of the owl family. It is not clear what this is based on. However, Bencao Gangmu on "demon chariot bird" may provide certain hints. The "demon chariot bird" is like a 鶬 cang (gray heron), but oddly different, thus called a "strange cang". The bird also looks like a xiuliu (鵂鹠) bird, which is a type of owl (鴟) and flies in the dark at night, gathering mosquitos. (Note: Liu Xun's Lingbiao luyi ("Record of Strange Things South of the Mountain Range" c. 900 CE). Note that the Bencao Gangmu consults the Lingbiao luyi and quotes from it saying the creature flies by night, but fails to say xiuliu is an owl.)

Minakata Kumagusu identified the xiuliu (鵂鹠) as a long-eared owl assigning the outdated Latin name Strix otus, and noted that the there is folklore about the strix in areas of Syria that they enter through open windows and kill infants (whereas Pliny has remarked on the Western myth that the strix leaves drops of milk on an infant's lips). (Note: Modern notes conjecture the strix in question may have been a vampire bat.) Minakata suggests that some nocturnal birds with mottled patterns on the chest may appear to have "paps" or lactating breasts, with the male and female often difficult to distinguish in certain species. And since an owl disgorges pellets (hairballs) that might be found in nests, this may have led to a legend in China that the owl fosters clumps of clay, which may have contributed as an element to the legend of the guhuo niao bird.

Edo Period thinker Hirata Atsutane reflected on the legend of the guhuoniao dripping blood on a house or a child at night, (Note: Hirata is analyzing the norito liturgy recorded in the Engishiki, where the text includes the phrase "天之血垂飛鳥の禍無く" ("[May] the heavenly blood-dripping flying bird lead to no misfortune")) and compared this to the actual habits of kites, crows, and owls carrying food which sometimes dribbled blood that leaked right through the grass-thatched roof, which was taken as a sign of ill omen in many parts of Japan.

== See also ==
- feather cloak#China – Type of cloak
- nine-headed bird - meaning "Devil Wagon" (also "devil chariot bird"), is the later name given to the feather cloak maidens of Chinese myth (swan maiden type tale). "Devil Wagon" by other accounts is a nine-headed bird
- Mae Nak Phra Khanong – Ghost of Thai folklore
- Caprimulgus - nightjar genus meaning "goat milker" from the myth that nightjars suckle on goats for milk
- strix (mythology) - in folklore squirted milk on the lips of infants
- ubume – Japanese yōkai of pregnant women
