= Kunibiki-shinwa =

The Kunibiki-shinwa (国引き神話, kunibiki-shinwa; "land-pulling myth") is a Japanese myth recorded in Izumo fudoki. It describes the pulling of different parts of neighbouring lands to the land of Izumo by the deity Yatsukamizu-Omizunu-no-mikoto.

According to the Izumo-fudoki annals, Yatsukamizu-omitsuno said: "The country Izumo, of the clouds rising, is a land like a pile of narrow cloth. First the land was made small. Therefore, it ought to be sewn larger". Using a hoe he pulled pieces of land from Shiragi (eastern Silla), Saki Country and other areas and connected them to Izumo to form the Shimane peninsula. The land pulled from Shiragi became Kidzuki Cape, beside which Izumo Taisha shrine is located. Its original name was Kidzuki-oyashiro and it was dedicated to Yatsukamizu-omitsuno. In another local myth the fight of Susanoo against Yamata no Orochi serpent may represent the flood control efforts of people living along Hii.

There is a theory this myth reflects ancient geographical transformation of the land of Izumo, when the alluvium of the Hii River connected the Shimane Peninsula to Izumo (on the Honshu island).
