= Yamata no Orochi =

Japanese dragon

- Eight-headed dragon
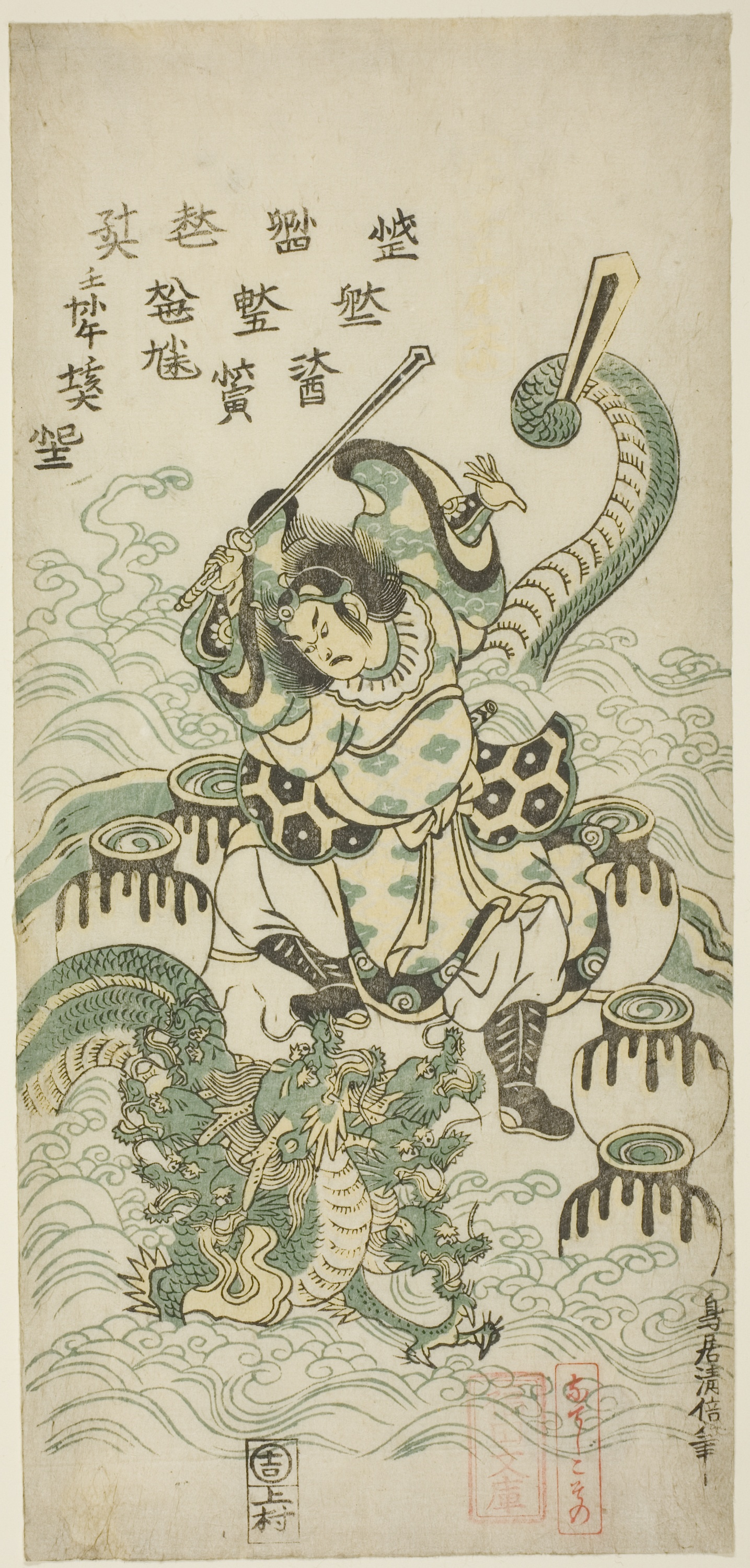
- An eighteenth century depiction of Susanoo no Mikoto slaying Yamata-no Orochi. Woodblock print by Torii Kiyomasu II.

Yamata no Orochi (八岐大蛇, 八俣遠呂智, 八俣遠呂知; ヤマタノオロチ) is a legendary eight-headed and eight-tailed serpent that appears in Japanese mythology. Both the Kojiki and Nihon Shoki record that the kami Susanoo no Mikoto, in order to rescue Kushinadahime, defeated the serpent and that the Kusanagi no Tsurugi, part of the Imperial Regalia of Japan, was found within the serpent's tail.

In local tradition, Yamata no Orochi was believed to have survived their encounter with Susanoo and fled to Mount Ibuki, where they were venerated as Ibuki Daimyōjin (伊吹大明神)). Additionally, figures such as Emperor Antoku and Longnü have been identified as incarnations of Yamato no Orochi.

== Name ==
The name Yamata no Orochi (八俣遠呂智 in the Kojiki, 八岐大蛇 in the Nihon Shoki) is variously translated as "Eight-Forked Serpent", "Eight-Headed-Serpent" and "Eight-Headed Dragon", with orochi (大蛇) being used in modern Japanese to refer to a large snake or dragon.

Orochi is derived from the Old Japanese woröti, but its etymology is enigmatic. While Western linguists have suggested that woröti is a loanword from Austronesian, Tungusic, and Indo-European languages, the more likely etymologies put forward by Japanese scholars argue that it comes from oro (尾ろ; "tail"), ō (大; "big/great"), or dialectal oro (峰ろ; "peak/summit"), in addition to chi (霊; "god/spirit"), possibly being a cognate with mizuchi, (蛟; "water spirit/dragon") and ikazuchi (雷; "[god of] thunder").

Yamata (八岐/八俣; "eight-forks/branches") on the other hand, may be related to other instances of "eight" (八, read as either yatsu or hachi) in Japanese literature, used to mean "many" or "several", for example: yata (八咫; "long/large"), yae (八重; "many-layered") and yashima (八洲; "many islands", i.e. Japan).

== Mythology ==
=== Kojiki ===
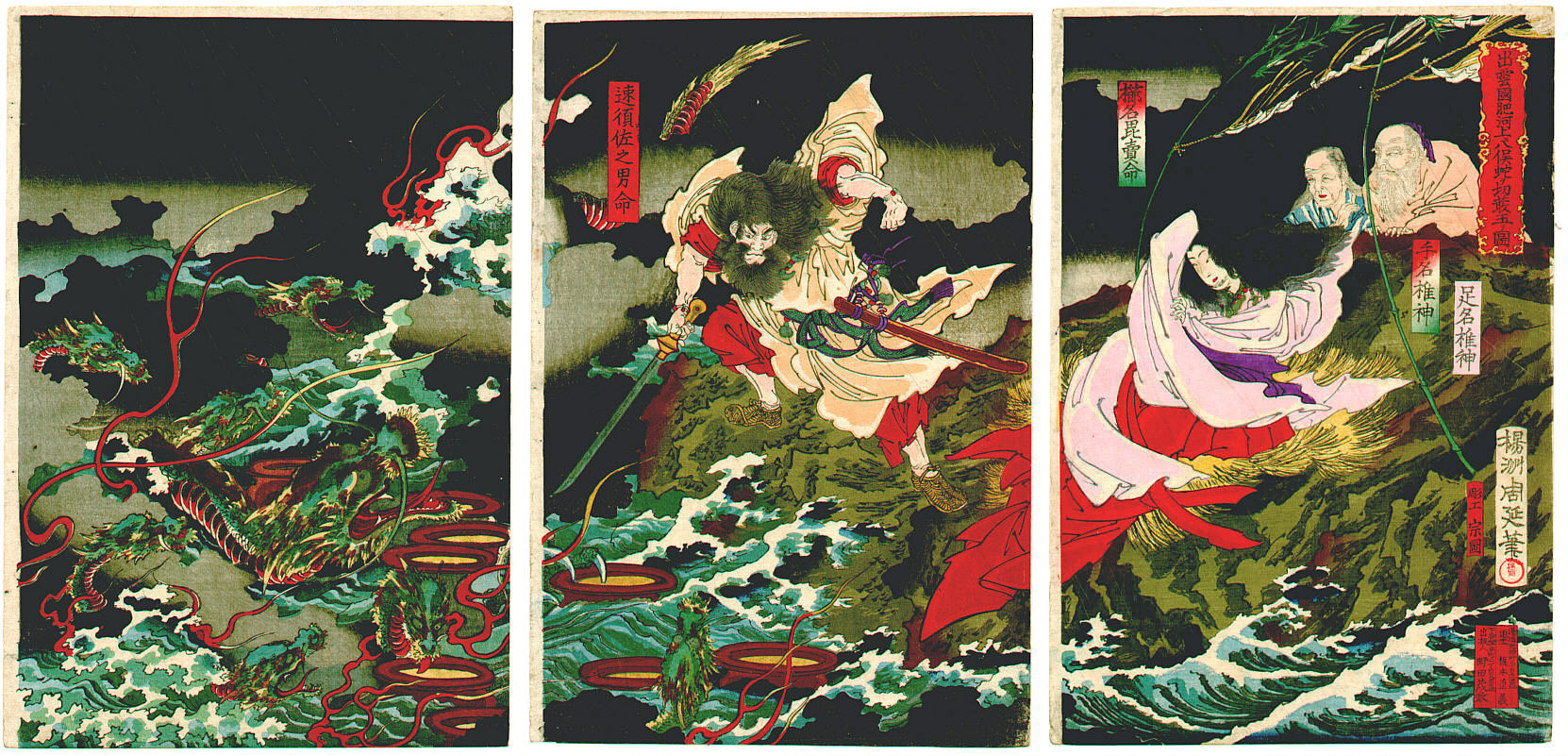
Susanoo rescuing Kushinada-hime from Yamata no Orochi, while Ashinazuchi and Tenazuchi look on from afar. Nineteenth century woodblock print by Toyohara Chikanobu.

The earliest record of the Yamata no Orochi myth comes from the Kojiki, the oldest extant source of Japanese mythology, completed in the year 712 by Ō no Yasumaro at the behest of Emperor Tenmu and Empress Genmei.

After being banished from Takamagahara, the god Susanoo (須佐之男) descended to a place called Torikami (鳥髪 (Note: Likely a phonetic rendering of 鳥上.)) in the land of Izumo, where he found a chopstick floating down the River Hi (簸川, known today as the Hii river). Taking this as a sign that there must be people living nearby, Susanoo traveled upstream and came across an elderly couple and a young girl, all of whom were weeping. The old man introduced himself as Ashinazuchi (足名椎), an earthly deity and child of the mountain god Ōyamatsumi. His wife was Tenazuchi (手名椎) and his daughter was Kushinada-hime (櫛名田比売). Originally the couple had eight daughters, but every year an eight-headed serpent from Koshi (高志之八俣遠呂智, Koshi no Yamata no Orochi) had appeared and devoured one of them. Now only Kushinada-hime remained and she was soon to be eaten too, for this reason the three of them wept. When questioned on the serpent's appearance, Ashinazuchi described it as such:

“Its eyes are like red cherries (赤酸醤, akakagachi (Note: An archaic name for the winter cherry.)) and it has eight heads and eight tails. Covered in moss, cypress and cedar, it spans eight valleys and eight peaks, and when you look at its belly you see blood oozing out everywhere.”

Revealing his identity as the younger brother of the goddess Amaterasu, Susanoo agreed to slay the serpent in exchange for Kushinada-hime's hand in marriage, to which Ashinazuchi gladly accepted. Thereafter, Susanoo transformed Kushinada-hime into a comb, which he stuck in the locks of his hair, and instructed Ashinazuchi and Tenazuchi to brew "eightfold-refined sake" (八塩折之酒, Yashiori-no-Sake). They were also told to build a fence with eight gates, and to place a vat of the sake at each gate. After which they were to await the serpent's arrival.

So they prepared everything as he told them to, whereupon the eight-headed serpent appeared, just as the old man had said it would. Straightaway it dipped a head in each cask and drank up the sake. Then it became drunk and fell asleep. And so the mighty Susanoo unsheathed the sword ten hand spans long (十拳剣, Totsuka-no-Tsurugi) that was girded by his side and hacked the serpent to pieces until the River Hi ran red with its blood. When he sliced off the middle tail, the blade of his mighty sword snapped off. And so, thinking this strange, he cut the tail open with the tip of the stub of his mighty blade and looked inside to find a keen-edged broadsword there. So he took the broadsword, marveling at it, and presented it to the Great August Deity Amaterasu with his account of what had happened. This is the broadsword Grass Cutter (草那藝之大刀, Kusanagi-no-Tachi).

The sword that Susanoo extracted from the serpent's tail, also called the Kusanagi-no-Tachi, is counted among the three imperial regalia of Japan. The other two treasures being the Yata-no-Kagami and Yasakani-no-Magatama.

=== Nihon Shoki ===
Following the Kojiki, the Nihon Shoki, compiled in the year 720 under the supervision of Prince Toneri, includes six different accounts of Susanoo's deeds following his exile from Takamagahara. Of these six variants, four make mention of Susanoo slaying the mythical serpent.

==== Version One ====
Having been banished from heaven, Susanoo (素戔嗚) descended to the headwaters of the River Hi, in the province of Izumo, where he heard the sound of weeping from upstream. Following this sound, Susanoo encountered an old man and woman caressing and lamenting over a young girl. When questioned by Susanoo, the elderly man introduced himself as an earthly deity named Ashinazuchi (脚摩乳), his wife was Tenazuchi (手摩乳), and their daughter was called Kushiinada-hime (奇稲田姫). The couple formerly had eight daughters, but they had been devoured year after year by an "eight-forked serpent" (八岐大蛇, Yamata no Orochi), and the two grieved that Kushiinada-hime was soon to be eaten too. In response, Susanoo asked for Kushiinada-hime's hand in marriage, which Ashinazuchi agreed to. He then turned Kushiinada-hime into a comb, which he hid in the knot of his hair, and made Ashinazuchi and Tenazuchi brew eight-fold sake (八醞酒, Yashiori-no-Sake). The two were further instructed to build eight cupboards, in each of which they set a tub of the sake, and to await the serpent's arrival.

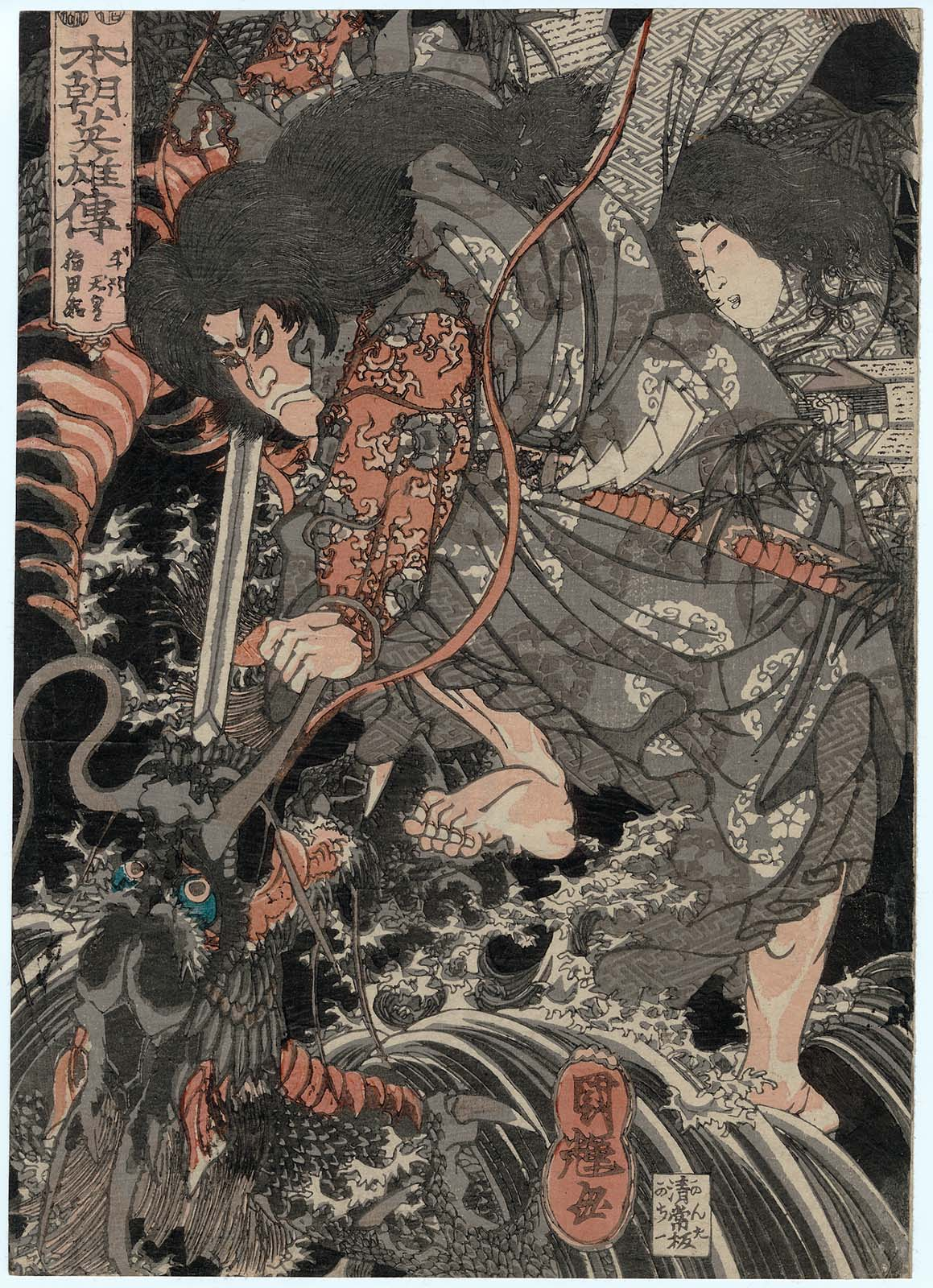
Gozu Tennō (Susanoo) slaying Yamata no Orochi. Nineteenth century woodblock print by Utagawa Kuniteru.

When the time came, the serpent actually appeared. It had an eight-forked head and an eight-forked tail; its eyes were red, like ground cherries (赤酸醤, akakagachi); and on its back, firs and cypresses were growing. As it crawled it extended over a space of eight hills and eight valleys. Now when it came and found the sake, each head drank up one tub, and it became drunken and fell asleep. Then Susanoo drew the Ten-Span Sword (十握剣, Totsuka-no-Tsurugi) which he wore, and chopped the serpent into small pieces. When he came to the tail, the edge of his sword was slightly notched, and he therefore split open the tail and examined it. Inside there was a sword. This is the sword which is called Kusanagi-no-Tsurugi (草薙剣; "Grass-Mowing Sword").

The Nihon Shoki also notes that, according to one account, the original name for the sword was Ama-no-Murakumo-no-Tsurugi (天叢雲剣; "Sword of Gathering Clouds of Heaven"):

It perhaps received this name from the clouds constantly gathering over the place where the serpent was. In the time of the Imperial Prince Yamato-dake its name was changed to Kusanagi-no-Tsurugi. Deciding not to appropriate the sword for himself, Susanoo submitted it as a gift to the gods of heaven.

==== Version Three ====
After his exile from Takamagahara, Susanoo came down to the headwaters of the River E (愛之川), in the province of Aki. There he encountered a god by the name of Ashinazu-Tenazu (脚摩手摩), and his wife, Inada-no-Miyanushi-Susano-Yatsumimi (稲田宮主簀狭之八箇耳), who was pregnant. The two deities lamented that, though they had borne many children, whenever one was born an eight-forked serpent came to devour it. Now that they were about to have another, they grieved that it would also be eaten. Hearing this, Susanoo proclaimed that he would slay the serpent for them, and instructed the two deities to take all manner of fruits and brew from them eight jars of sake.

The two gods, in accordance with his instructions, prepared sake. When the time came for the child to be born, the serpent came indeed to the door, and was about to devour the child. But Susanoo addressed the serpent, and said: “Thou art truly an awful god. How could I dare neglect to feast thee?” So he took the eight jars of sake, and poured one into each of its mouths. The serpent drank it up and fell asleep. Susanoo drew his sword and slew it. When he came to sever its tail, the edge of his sword was slightly notched. He split the tail open and examined it, when he found that inside it there was a sword. This sword is called Kusanagi-no-Tsurugi.

According to this passage, the Kusanagi-no-Tsurugi was held at the village of Ayuchi (吾湯) in Owari, where it was the god venerated by the Hafuribe (Note: Shinto priests.) of Atsuta (熱田祝部). Additionally, the sword that Susanoo used to slay the serpent, called the Orochi-no-Aramasa (蛇之麁正 (Note: A name possibly linked to Ara Kaya (阿羅伽耶), one of the five Kaya states in the south eastern part of the Korean peninsula.)), was held at Isonokami Shrine. The child that Inada-no-Miyanushi-no-Susano-Yatsumimi gave birth to, named Inagami-Furukushi-Nada-hime (真髪触奇稲田姫), returned to Izumo where she grew up at the head of the River Hi. Susanoo later took her as his wife and had by her a child, whose descendant was Ōnamuchi-no-Mikoto.

==== Version Four ====
Susanoo wished to favor Inada-hime, and so asked Ashinazuchi and Tenazuchi for her hand in marriage. However, the two requested that he first slay a great serpent (大蛇), which had stone firs growing on each of its heads, and mountains on each of its sides.

Susanoo thereupon devised a plan. He brewed a poisonous sake, which he gave it to drink. The serpent became drunk, and fell asleep. Susanoo forthwith took his sword, called Orochi-no-Karasabi (蛇韓鋤; "Serpent's Kara Blade" (Note: Kara (韓) being a term that loosely refers to Korea and/or China.)), and severed its head and severed its belly. When he severed its tail, the edge of the sword was slightly notched, so he split the tail open and made examination. He found there another sword, which he called Kusanagi-no-Tsurugi.

The passage likewise claims that the Kusanagi-no-Tsurugi was located within the province of Owari, though the Orochi-no-Karasabi is instead said to be held by the Kanbe (Note: Peasants charged with the care of a Shinto shrine.) of Kibi (吉備神部). The mountain at the upper reaches of the River Hi in Izumo is also noted as the location in which the serpent was slain.

==== Version Five ====
In response to Susanoo's unruly behavior, all the gods imposed on him a fine of a thousand tables [of offerings], leading to his banishment from heaven. Susanoo, accompanied by his son Isotakeru-no-Kami (五十猛神), therefore descended to the land of Silla where he dwelt at a place called Soshimori (曾尸茂梨). Wishing not to stay in this land however, he formed a boat out of clay and embarked eastwards across the sea, until he arrived at Mount Torikami (鳥上之峰, Torikami no Take) at the headwaters of the River Hi in Izumo.

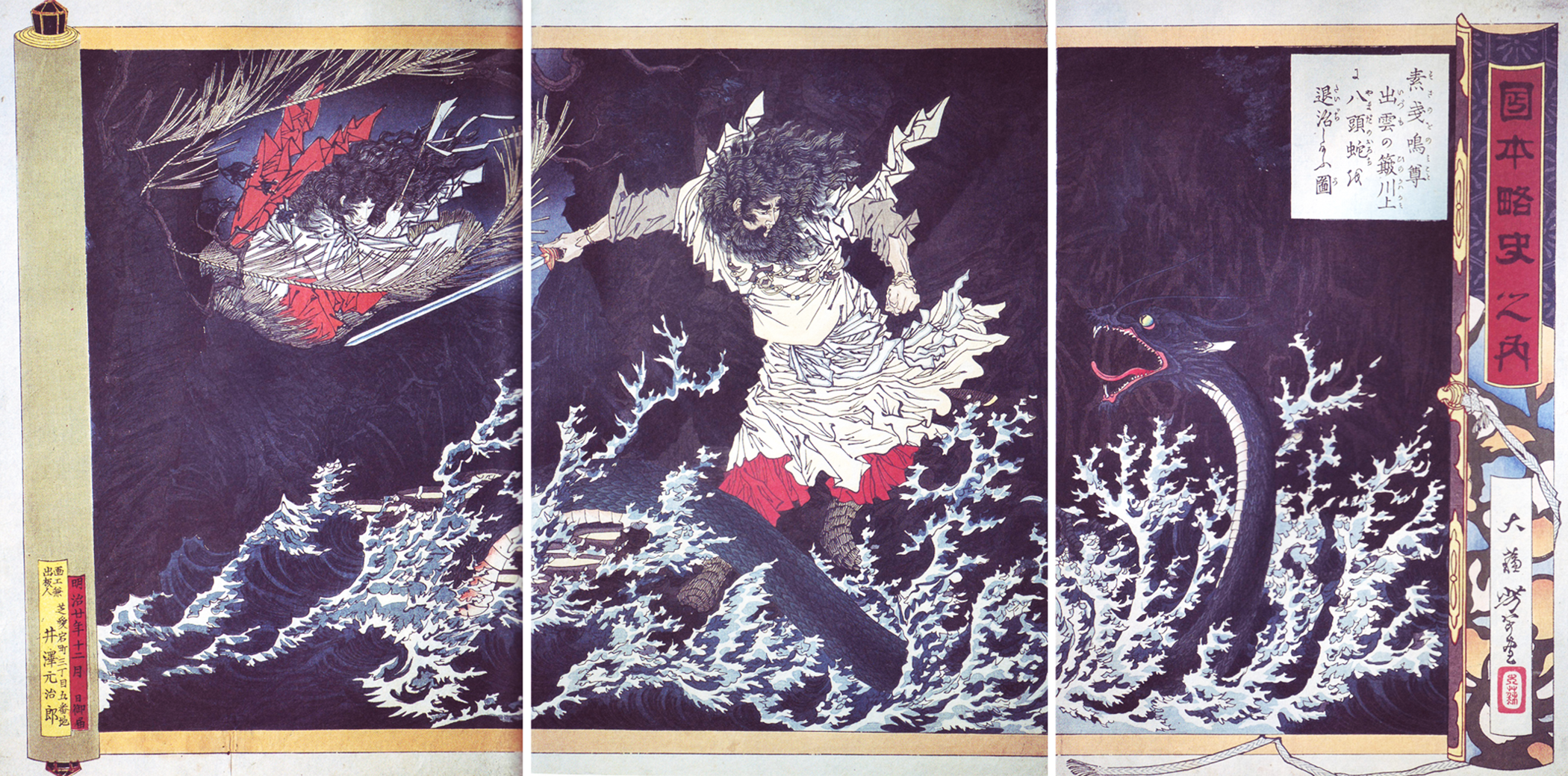
Susanoo slaying Yamata no Orochi, upstream of the River Hi in Izumo. Nineteenth century woodblock print by Tsukioka Yoshitoshi.

Now there was in this place a serpent which devoured men. Susanoo accordingly took his sword, called Ama-no-Hahakiri (天蠅斫; "Heavenly Fly-Cutter" (Note: According to the Kogo Shūi, snakes were formerly known as Haha (羽々), as such the name could also be interpreted as "Heavenly Serpent-Cutter".)), and slew this serpent. Now when he cut the serpent’s tail, the edge of his sword was notched. Thereupon he split open the tail, and on examination, found within it a divine sword.

Susanoo decided not to keep the blade for himself, and sent his descendant Ama-no-Fukine-no-Kami (天之葺根神) to offer it up to Heaven. Henceforth, the sword was known as Kusanagi-no-Tsurugi.

=== Sendai Kuji Hongi ===
The slaying of Yamata no Orochi is further recounted in the Sendai Kuji Hongi, a record of Japanese history supposedly written by the legendary Prince Shōtoku. The antiquity and authorship of the text were brought into question during the seventeenth century however, and the Kujiki instead appears to have been a later creation, incorporating elements of the Kojiki, Nihon Shoki and Kogo Shūi. Moreover, the elaborate mythical origins attributed to the Mononobe lineage suggest that the text was authored by a member of the clan.

Due to this composite nature, the text largely reiterates elements from the above-mentioned accounts of Yamata no Orochi, such as Susanoo's descent to the land of Soshimori in Silla alongside his son Isotakeru, his arrival at Mount Torikami at the headwaters of the River Hi in Izumo (though the text simultaneously states that he arrived at the headwaters of the River E in Aki), and his marriage to Kushiinada-hime. However, the Kujiki also notes that, when Susanoo tricked the eight-forked serpent from Koshi (高志八岐大蛇) into getting drunk on the sake brewed by Ashinazuchi and Tenazuchi, he chopped the serpent into eight pieces. From these eight pieces emerged eight thunder [gods] (八雷), who ascended to heaven.

=== Heike Monogatari ===
In book eleven of the Kakuichi-bon (覚一本) edition of the Heike Monogatari, compiled in the year 1371 by the blind monk Akashi Kakuichi, a retelling of the Yamata no Orochi myth is included in the chapter titled Tsurugi (剣; "The Sword"):

In that far-off time, Susano-o-no-Mikoto descended to the headwaters of the river Hi in the province of Izumo, and there he met a pair of earthly deities named Ashinazuchi, the husband, and Tenazuchi, the wife. They had a beautiful daughter called Inada-hime. All three were weeping.

“Why do you weep?” Susano-o-no-mikoto asked. To this question they replied: “Once we had eight daughters. The serpent swallowed all of them except the one that you see here, and soon it is to have her too. This serpent's eight heads and tails slither over eight peaks and valleys. On its back grow queer plants and trees. Its years number uncounted thousands, and its eyes are like the sun and moon. Every year it devours humans. Children mourn their parents, eaten; parents mourn their eaten children. Whether south or north of our village, cries of mourning never cease.”

Moved to pity, the god changed their daughter to a pristine comb and concealed it in his hair. He filled eight tubs with sake, made a likeness of her, and stood it up on a high place. The sake reflected her form. The serpent, thinking she was real, drained the tubs to the last drop and lay there drunk, dead to the world. The god drew the Totsuka sword from the scabbard at his waist and fiercely slashed the serpent to pieces. One tail, though, he could not cut. This struck him as strange. He slit the tail open lengthwise. peered inside, and discovered there a spirit sword, which he took and presented to the Sun Goddess.

“This,” she said, “is the sword that I dropped long ago on the High Plain of Heaven. While it was in the serpent's tail, thick cloud always covered the land, so it bore the name Ama-no-Murakumo-no-Tsurugi, 'Sword of Celestial Cloud'.”

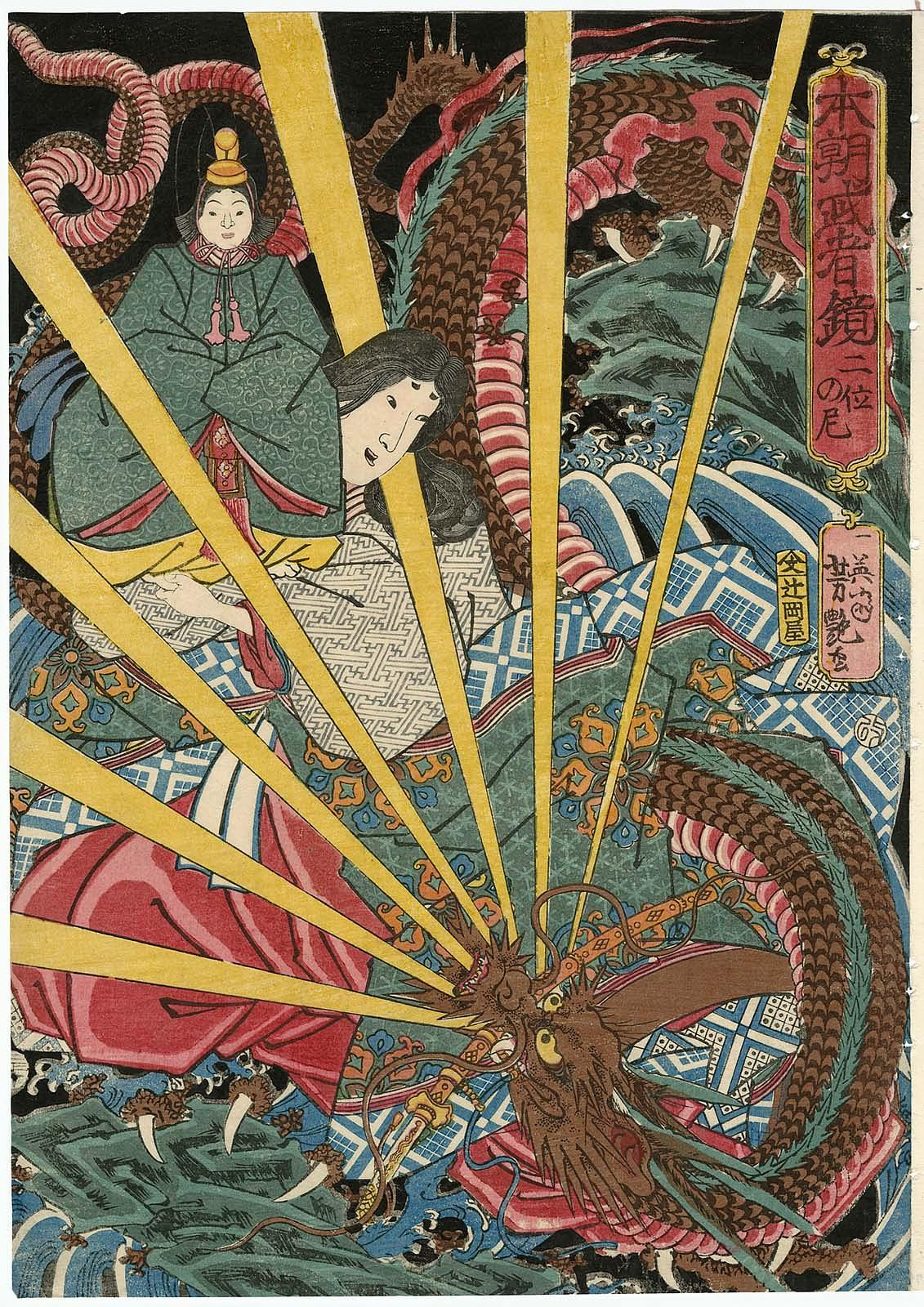
Nii no Ama plunging into the sea, alongside Emperor Antoku. Nineteenth century woodblock print by Yoshitsuya Ichieisai.

According to the epic, the Kusanagi-no-Tsurugi was lost during the Battle of Dan-no-Ura after Taira no Tokiko threw herself, and Emperor Antoku, overboard while carrying the blade. As such, it was believed that Yamata no Orochi had reincarnated as Emperor Antoku to retrieve their stolen sword:

So they pronounced themselves, and one learned doctor (Note: Yin-yang diviner.) added, “The great serpent slain of old by Susano-o-no-mikoto, at the headwaters of the river Hi in the province of Izumo, so profoundly desired the spirit sword he had lost that, in token of his eight heads and tails, he took the form of the eightieth human sovereign and, in the person of an emperor in his eighth year, took it back and dove with it to the bottom of the sea.” In the depths of the ocean abyss, the sword was now the Dragon God's prize. Naturally, no one could expect to see it again in the human realm.

The identification of Yamata no Orochi with Emperor Antoku may stem from the belief in which the latter was a reincarnation of the Taira clan's tutelary deity, Itsukushima Daimyōjin (Note: Also known as Ichikishima-hime, one of the three goddesses born as a result of the pledge between Amaterasu and Susanoo.) (厳島大明神), as noted in the Gukanshō, composed about a generation after the Battle of Dan-no-Ura by the Buddhist monk and poet Jien. Itsukushima Daimyōjin was herself understood to be the third daughter of the Dragon King Sagara, and the sister of both Empress Jingū and Toyohime (Note: A name that may refer to Toyotama-hime, one of the daughters of Watatsumi.) (淀姫).

Emperor Antoku is additionally acknowledged as the reincarnation of Yamata no Orochi in the noh play Kusanagi (草薙), in which the monk Genshin is told of how the serpent assumed the identity of Emperor Antoku to reclaim the Kusanagi-no-Tsurugi. Yamata no Orochi is then said to have reappeared to impede Yamato Takeru in his conquest of eastern Japan.

== Analysis ==
Due to the prominence of the River Hi (簸川, now called the River Hii) in the Yamata no Orochi myth, scholars have often interpreted the serpent as a personification of the river itself. Moreover, Miura Sukeyuki views the tale as a conflict between culture and nature, regarding Yamata no Orochi as a river god, symbolic of nature, and Susanoo as a representation of the "culture" that brings new order. Following this interpretation, the myth can be seen as dealing with agriculture, specifically wet-rice cultivation, with Kushiinada-hime (奇稲田姫; "Lady Wonderous Rice Paddy") symbolizing a rice field, and the annual sacrifice of Ashinazuchi and Tenazuchi's daughters serving as a contract with the river god to ensure good harvest. In a similar vein, the myth has also been interpreted as dealing with flooding, as the River Hi frequently burst its banks prior to its course being redirected during the Edo period. The Victorian anthropologist Edward Burnett Tylor for instance, stated that Yamata no Orochi was understood as an eight-mouthed river, adding that: “the story seems really that of the wind and the flood.” Though, by Tylor's own admission, no Japanese sources actually recognize Susanoo as a god of winds.

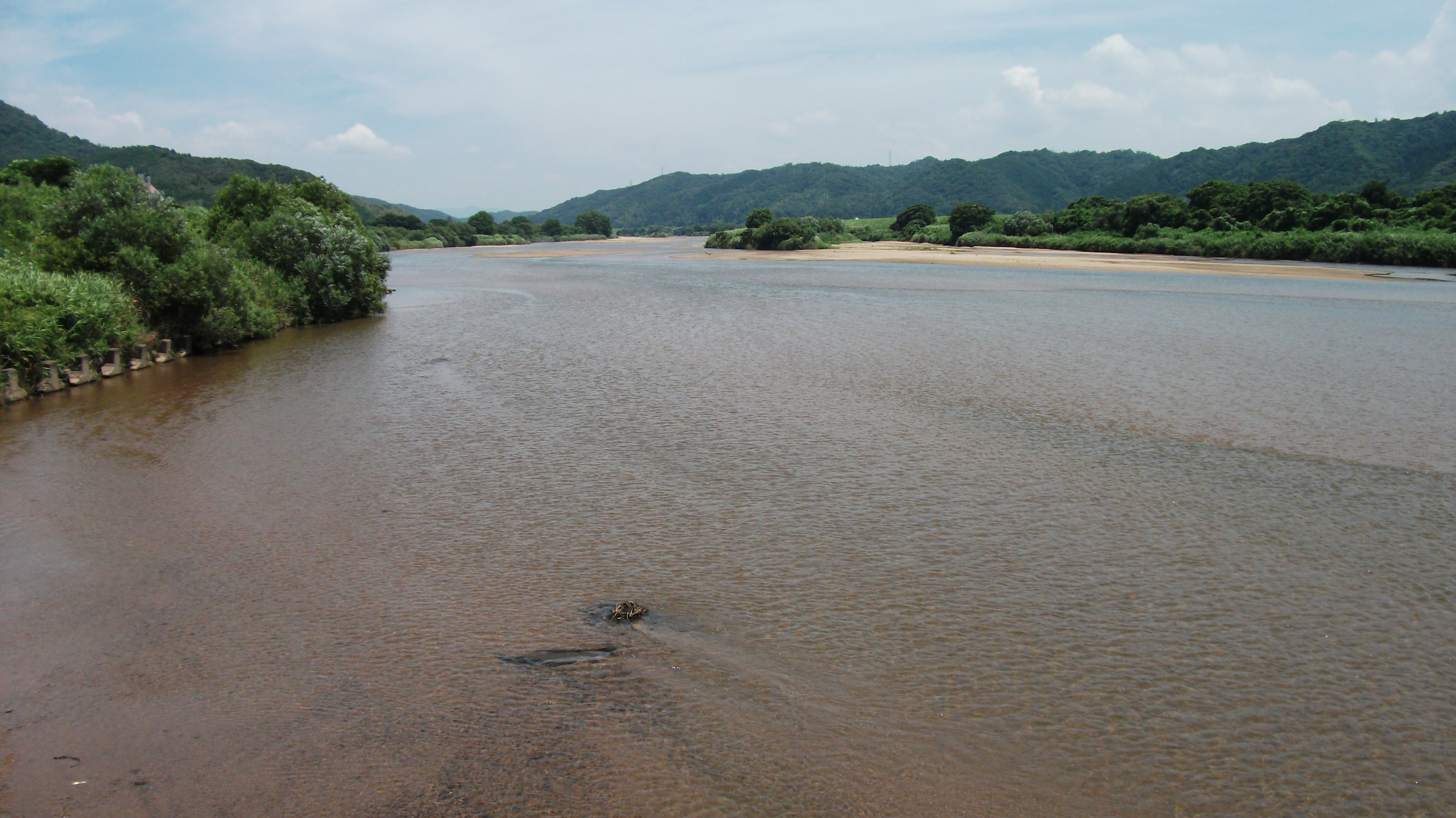
The Hii river in Shimane, formerly known as the Hi river (簸川).

Dragons are also frequently linked to bodies of water in Indian, Chinese and Japanese folklore, and were believed to serve as providers and withholders of rain. In particular, Yamata no Orochi has been compared to the Chinese jiaolong, a malevolent river-dwelling dragon, distinguished from the "real dragon" which was said to be benevolent and provided rain and fertility. Furthermore, the Jiaolong is noted for its ability to assume numerous forms, including that of a sword. The notion of the Kusanagi-no-Tsurugi being retrieved from Yamata no Orochi's tail may also reflect an ancient folk belief, that appears in oral traditions throughout Japan, in which potholes were drilled by dragons ascending to heaven with the sharp swords growing from their tails.

According to David Weiss, the conception of the dragon as a water god that must be propitiated to ensure sufficient water supply for agriculture, and to prevent floods, seems to form the oldest layer of the widespread "dragon-slayer" myth, classified as type 300 in the Aarne–Thompson–Uther Index, which he identifies the slaying of Yamata no Orochi as an articulation of.

Other scholars have instead associated the Yamata no Orochi myth with the arrival of advanced metalworking techniques from the Korean peninsula. In these more euhemeristic explanations, Susanoo is typically regarded as the ancestral deity, or leader, of a group of metalworkers, often of Korean descent, while Yamata no Orochi may be explained as a mountain spirit that was responsible for causing rainstorms and floods. According to this view, the landslides that resulted from such flooding would have brought rich deposits of iron sand to the surface that were, in turn, made into swords. As such, the swords made from this iron may have been viewed as parts of the mountain spirit's tail, in its serpent form. Though these interpretations have been criticized as regarding myths as nothing more than "the allegorical representation of actual historical events and persons," which miss the many layers of meaning that constitute myth. Instead, Weiss argues, it is more likely that the introduction of new metalworking techniques added an additional layer of meaning to a preexisting narrative.

An eighteenth century depiction of a Jiao (蛟) dragon, from the Gujin Tushu Jicheng.

Lending some credence to the metallurgical interpretations of the myth is the Izumo no Kuni Fudoki (出雲国風土記; "Topography of the Izumo Province"), which notes that the most significant center of iron production in Izumo was the Nita District. The same region that serves as the setting for the Yamata no Orochi myth in both the Kojiki and the Nihon shoki. The Izumo Fudoki also suggests a connection between Susanoo and metalworking, with the text attributing two sons to Susanoo, named Tsurugi-hiko (都留支日子; "Sword Prince") and Tsuki-hoko-tooyoru-hiko (衝杵等乎而留比古; "God of the Penetrating Halberd"). Moreover, the township of Susa, from which Susanoo is said to have received his name, is situated in Iishi District, which served as one of the centers of iron production in Izumo during the Nara period. As a result, it is not implausible that Susanoo may have been a deity venerated by metalworkers in the Izumo province.

Authors such as Ōbayashi Taryō have also drawn parallels between the Yamata no Orochi myth and similar tales from other cultures, e.g. the slaying of Cetus by Perseus, with Taryō concluding that the various dragon-slayer myths of Asia and Europe can be traced back to a common origin. He further suggests that the dragon-slayer myth was transmitted to Japan alongside metallurgical techniques from the area to the south of the lower reaches of the Yangzi River, possibly via southern Korea. However, the lack of documented Korean tales comparable to the Yamata no Orochi myth make it difficult to postulate a transmission of the narrative via the Korean peninsula.

A link between the Yamata no Orochi myth and Korea may be suggested by two of the names attributed to Susanoo's sword; Orochi-no-Aramasa (蛇之麁正) and Orochi-no-Karasabi (蛇韓鋤), which are both derived from the Korean peninsula. Additionally, a variant of the myth provided in the Nihon Shoki states that Susanoo crossed over to Izumo from the Korean kingdom of Silla. Roy Andrew Miller and Nelly Naumann have also drawn a connection between the word kusanagi and the Korean kurŏng'i (구렁이; "a large snake/serpent"), and further reconstructed the Old Korean form kusïnki, "which was then borrowed into Old Japanese to appear there as kusanagi."

The Yamata no Orochi myth places particular emphasis on the discovery of the Kusanagi-no-Tsurugi, which was revered as one of the three imperial regalia, perhaps reflecting its central importance to the narrative. Weiss has suggested the discovery of the sword may have been a late addition, made by the scribes writing down the imperial chronicles at the Yamato court, in order to explain the origin of one of the imperial regalia. The association of the myth with Izumo would therefore reflect the court's perception of Izumo as an important center of metallurgical expertise and metal production, which had to be linked to the ancestors of the imperial family in order to strengthen their claim to hegemony over the region. The fact that the Izumo Fudoki makes no mention of the slaying of Yamata no Orochi has additionally led many scholars to argue that the narrative was fabricated at the imperial court, and is not based on any local tradition.

== Worship ==
In local belief surrounding Mount Ibuki, Yamata no Orochi was thought to have survived their encounter with Susanoo and taken refuge on the mountain, where they came to be deified as Ibuki Daimyōjin (伊吹大明神). This same deity was also responsible for the death of Yamato Takeru, who succumbed to illness after his encounter with the mountain god:

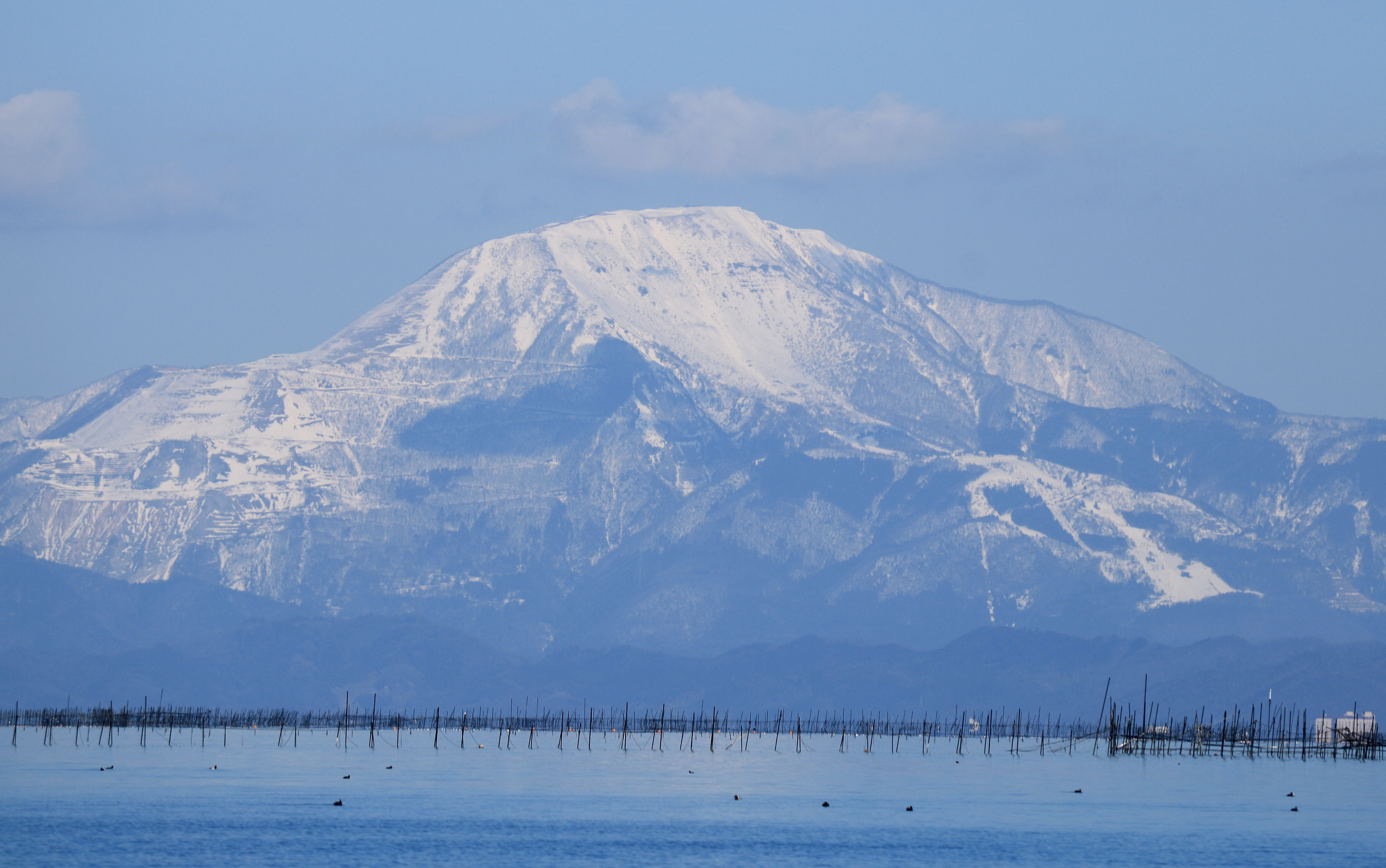
Mount Ibuki as viewed from Lake Biwa.

Yamato Takeru no Mikoto (日本武尊), having returned again to Owari, straightway took to wife a daughter of the Owari House, by name Miyazu-hime (宮簀媛), and tarried there until the next month. Here he heard that on Mount Ibuki in Ōmi there was a savage deity. So he took off his sword, and leaving it in the house of Miyazu-hime, went on afoot. When he arrived at Mount Ibuki, the god of the mountain took the shape of a great-serpent (大蛇), and posted himself on the road.

Hereupon Yamato Takeru no Mikoto, not knowing that it was the chief god who had become a serpent, said to himself: “This serpent must be the savage deity’s messenger. Having already slain a chief god, is a messenger worth hunting after?”

Accordingly he strode over the serpent and passed on. Then the God of the mountain raised up the clouds, and made an icy rain to fall. The tops of the hills became covered with mist, and the valleys enveloped in gloom. There was no path which he could follow. He was in a state of panic and knew not whither to turn his steps. However, braving the mist, he forced his way onwards, and barely succeeded in escaping.

Ibuki Daimyōjin is additionally noted as being the father of Shuten Dōji in the Nara picture book (奈良絵本, Nara Ehon) Ōeyama (大江山). According to Ōeyama, the god of Mount Ibuki, whose true identity was Yamata no Orochi, impregnated the daughter of Lord Sugawa (須川殿) due to his nightly visits. Upset by the news of his daughter's pregnancy, Lord Sugawa summoned various religious specialists to exorcize the spirit. This angered the mountain god, who in-turn caused Lord Sugawa to fall ill. Subsequently, in an effort to pacify the deity, Yamata no Orochi came to be worshiped as Ibuki Daimyōjin.

Owing to Buddhist reinterpretations of Susanoo's slaying of Yamata no Orochi, the latter also came to be identified with the Nāga Maiden of the Lotus Sutra. The Nihon Shoki Sanso (日本書紀纂疏), written in the fifteenth century by Ichijō Kaneyoshi, for instance, mentions the belief in which the Nāga Maiden served as an avatar of the eight-headed serpent. Though according to the Shaku Nihongi, it is instead Susanoo's wife, Kushinada-hime, who is identified with the daughter of the Dragon King. In his explanation of the deities enshrined at Gion-jinja (祇園神社), Kaneyoshi additionally speculates that Jadokkeshin (蛇毒気神; "Deity of the Poisoned Snake Breath"), alternatively read as Dadokuke-no-Kami, is an incarnation of Yamata no Orochi.

“Third is Dadokuke-no-Kami (蛇毒気神), which I suspect is an incarnation (化現, kegen) of the eight-forked serpent (八岐大蛇, Yamata no Orochi).”

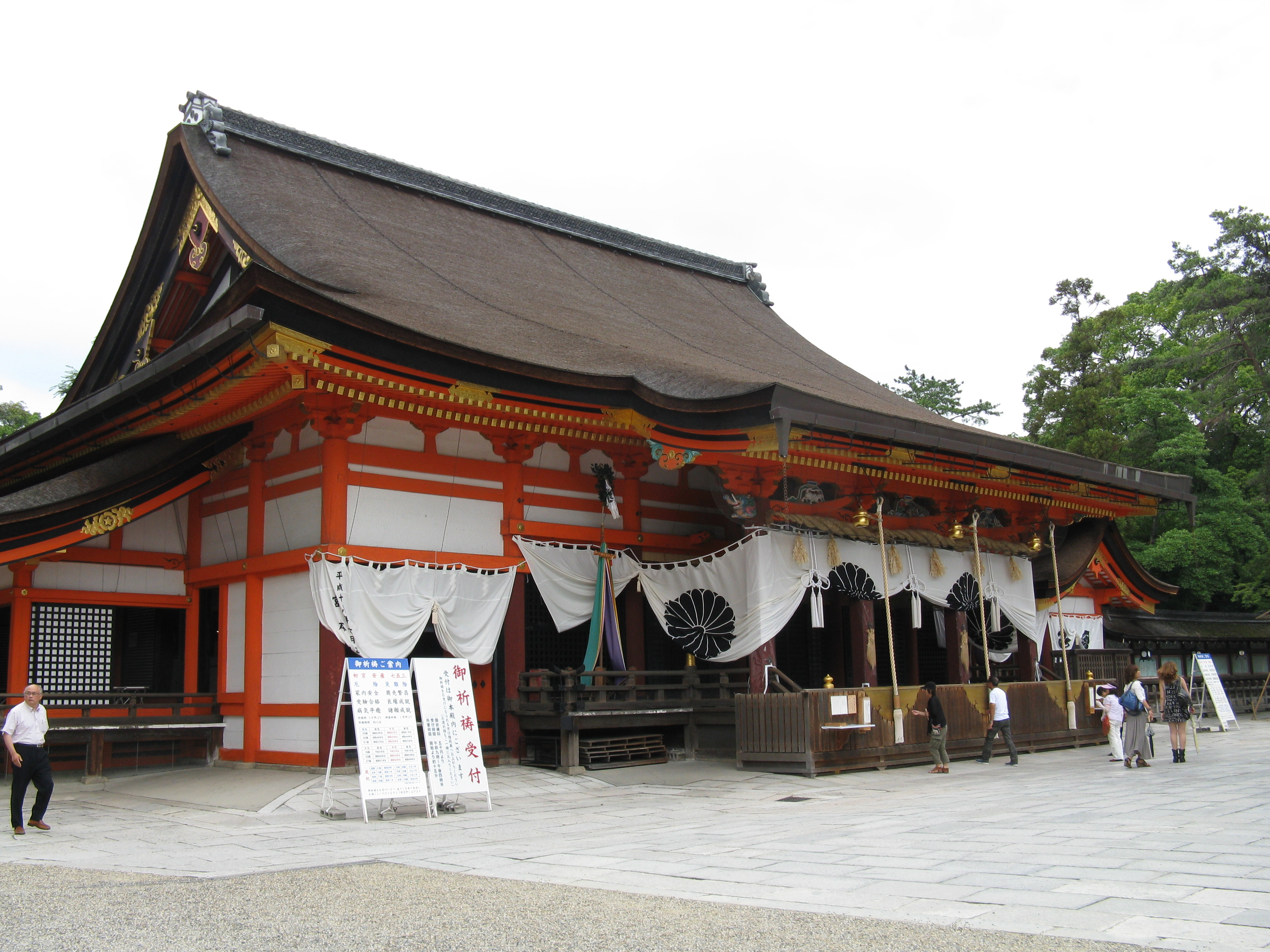
The honden of the Yasaka Shrine in Kyoto, formerly known as Gion Shrine (祇園神社, Gion-jinja) prior to the separation of Shinto from Buddhism.

Jadokkeshin is herself an obscure deity who is noted in the writings of Kujō Michiie as the consort of Gozu Tennō, a god of epidemics that was commonly conflated with Susanoo during the medieval period. In later works however, Jadokkeshin is typically included among the eight children of Gozu Tennō and Harisaijo, known as the Hachiōji (八王子; "Eight Princes"). The eight princes were collectively venerated as protective figures, identified at times with both the eight dragon kings (八大龍王) and the eight generals (八将神), the latter of whom served as directional deities in Onmyōdō. Among the eight generals, Jadokkeshin corresponded to the astral deity Hyōbi (豹尾), and was further identified as a manifestation of Sanbō Kōjin in the Hoki Naiden (簠簋内伝). Jadokkeshin also appears to have been worshiped separately, outside of the group formed by the eight princes, and is characterized as both a god of pestilence (行疫神, gyōyakujin) and a placenta deity (胞衣神, enagami).

Furthermore, Jadokkeshin features prominently in the narratives surrounding Gozu Tennō. In the Gozu Tennō Shimawatari Saimon (牛頭天王島渡り祭文), a ritual text recited during the Flower Festival (花祭り, Hana-matsuri) held at Okumikawa, after marrying Harisaijo and rearing seven children in the Dragon Palace, Gozu Tennō is said to have traveled to Japan with his family and eighty-four thousand retainers. Along the way they encountered a monstrous red snake, that claimed to be their abandoned daughter Jadokkeshin. The Hokishō (簠簋抄), a commentary on the Hoki Naiden written in the Edo period, elaborates on this further, stating that Jadokkeshin was born from the discarded placentas of her seven brothers.

Jadoku (蛇毒; "snake's poison") said: “I came into being from the gathering of placentas and menstrual blood that were thrown away in the Pond of Reverse Blood (血逆の池, Ketsugyaku no Ike).”

No extant depictions of Jadokkeshin are known. However, the Honchō Seiki makes mention of a statue of Jadokkeshin, which was destroyed by the fire that broke out at Kankei-ji (観慶時, a Buddhist temple overseeing the Gion Shrine) in 1070.

== In popular culture ==
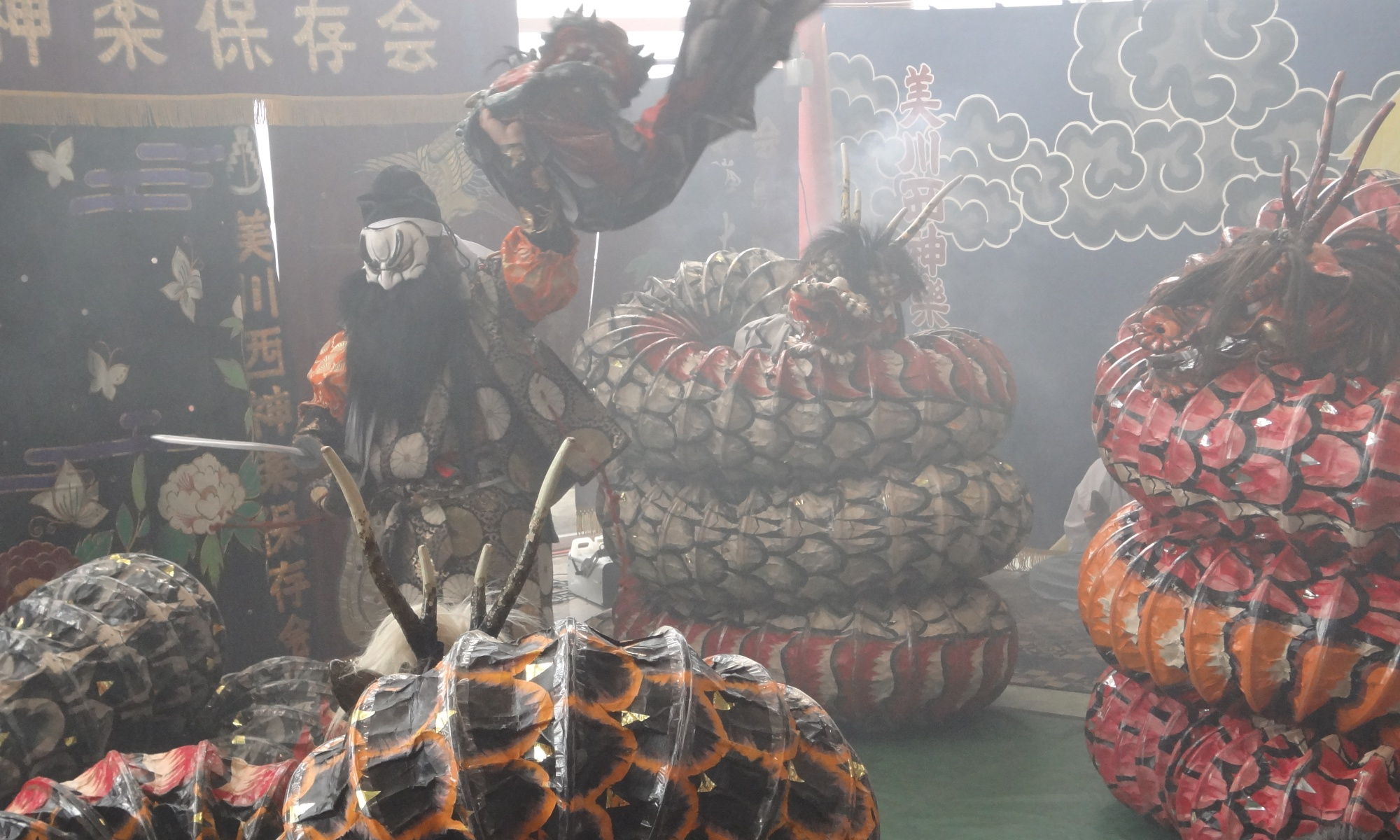
A reenactment of Susanoo slaying the eight-headed serpent in a performance of Orochi (大蛇), a play in Iwami Kagura.

To this day, the Yamata no Orochi myth still plays a significant role in the culture of the Shimane prefecture. Yamata no Orochi is depicted in the logo of Susanoo Kankō (スサノオ観光; "Susanoo Sightseeing"), a major bus company based in Izumo City, alongside the logo of Matsue's professional basketball team; Shimane Susanoo Magic. The biggest highway loop in the prefecture, Okuizumo Orochi Loop (奥出雲おろちループ), and a major street in Izumo City, Orochi Street (おろち通り), are also named after the serpent.

Susanoo's slaying of Yamata no Orochi is reenacted as part of Iwami Kagura (石見神楽), a kind of folk theater popular in the western part of Shimane (formerly the Iwami province), in which Orochi (大蛇) is the most popular and regularly performed play.

Yamata no Orochi also appears prominently in media. The 1963 film The Little Prince and the Eight-Headed Dragon (わんぱく王子の大蛇退治, Wanpaku Ōji no Orochi Taiji, lit. "The Naughty Prince's Slaying of Orochi") for instance, is based loosely on the mythology surrounding Susanoo, and features his fight with Yamata no Orochi during the film's climax. Additionally, the video game Ōkami features the eight-headed serpent Orochi as an antagonist. The game deviates from mythological accounts however, as the player character Amaterasu is the one tasked with defeating Orochi, while Susanoo plays a supporting role. In the fighting games The King of Fighters, Orochi is regarded as the "Will of Gaia" that will destroy the world upon its resurrection. The leads Kyo Kusanagi and his rival Iori Yagami inherited the powers of the Imperial Regalia of Japan needed to defeat the demon while the supporting character Chizuru Kagura remains as the guardian of the seal when the creature is defeated.

== Bibliography ==
- Aston, William George (1896). Nihongi : chronicles of Japan from the earliest times to A.D. 697. Vol. 1. Kegan Paul, Trench, Trübner & Co.
- Bialock, David T. (2002). "Outcasts, Emperorship, and Dragon Cults in The Tale of the Heike". Cahiers d'Extrême-Asie. 13: 227–310. doi:10.3406/asie.2002.1185. ISSN 0766-1177. JSTOR 44167361.
- Carr, Michael (1990). "Chinese dragon names". Linguistics of the Tibeto-Burman Area. 13 (2). doi:10.32655/LTBA.13.2.04. hdl:10356/179225. ISSN 0731-3500.
- Chamberlain, Basil H. (1932). Translation of "Ko-ji-ki" or "Records of Ancient Matters". J. L. Thompson & Co. doi:10.1017/S0035869X00083519.
- Faure, Bernard (2022). Rage and Ravage. Gods of Medieval Japan. Vol. 3. University of Hawaii Press. ISBN 978-0-8248-8938-8.
- Heldt, Gustav (2014). The Kojiki: An Account of Ancient Matters. Columbia University Press. ISBN 9780231163880.
- Lin, Irene H. (2002). "The Ideology of Imagination: The Tale of Shuten Dōji as a Kenmon Discourse". Cahiers d'Extrême-Asie. 13: 379–410. doi:10.3406/asie.2002.1188. ISSN 0766-1177. JSTOR 44167364.
- Saitō, Hideki (2012). "The Worship of Gozu Tennō and the Ritual World of the Izanagi-ryū". Cahiers d'Extrême-Asie. 21: 277–301. doi:10.3406/asie.2012.1403. ISSN 0766-1177. JSTOR 44167496.
- Tho, Nguyen Ngoc (2015). The Symbol of the Dragon and Ways to Shape Cultural Identities in Vietnam and Japan (Thesis). University of Social Sciences and Humanities, Vietnam National University. S2CID 147703121.
- Tyler, Royall (2012). The Tale of the Heike. Penguin Publishing Group. ISBN 9781101601099.
- Weiss, David (2018). "Slaying the Serpent: Comparative Mythological Perspectives on Susanoo's Dragon Fight". Journal of Asian Humanities at Kyushu University. 3: 1–20. doi:10.5109/1916286. hdl:2324/1916286. ISSN 2433-4855.
- Weiss, David (2022). The God Susanoo and Korea in Japan's Cultural Memory: Ancient Myths and Modern Empire. Bloomsbury Shinto Studies. Bloomsbury Academic. ISBN 9781350271180.
