= Ishiya Kofun =

Historic site in Matsue, Shimane, Japan

- 石屋古墳 (Japanese)
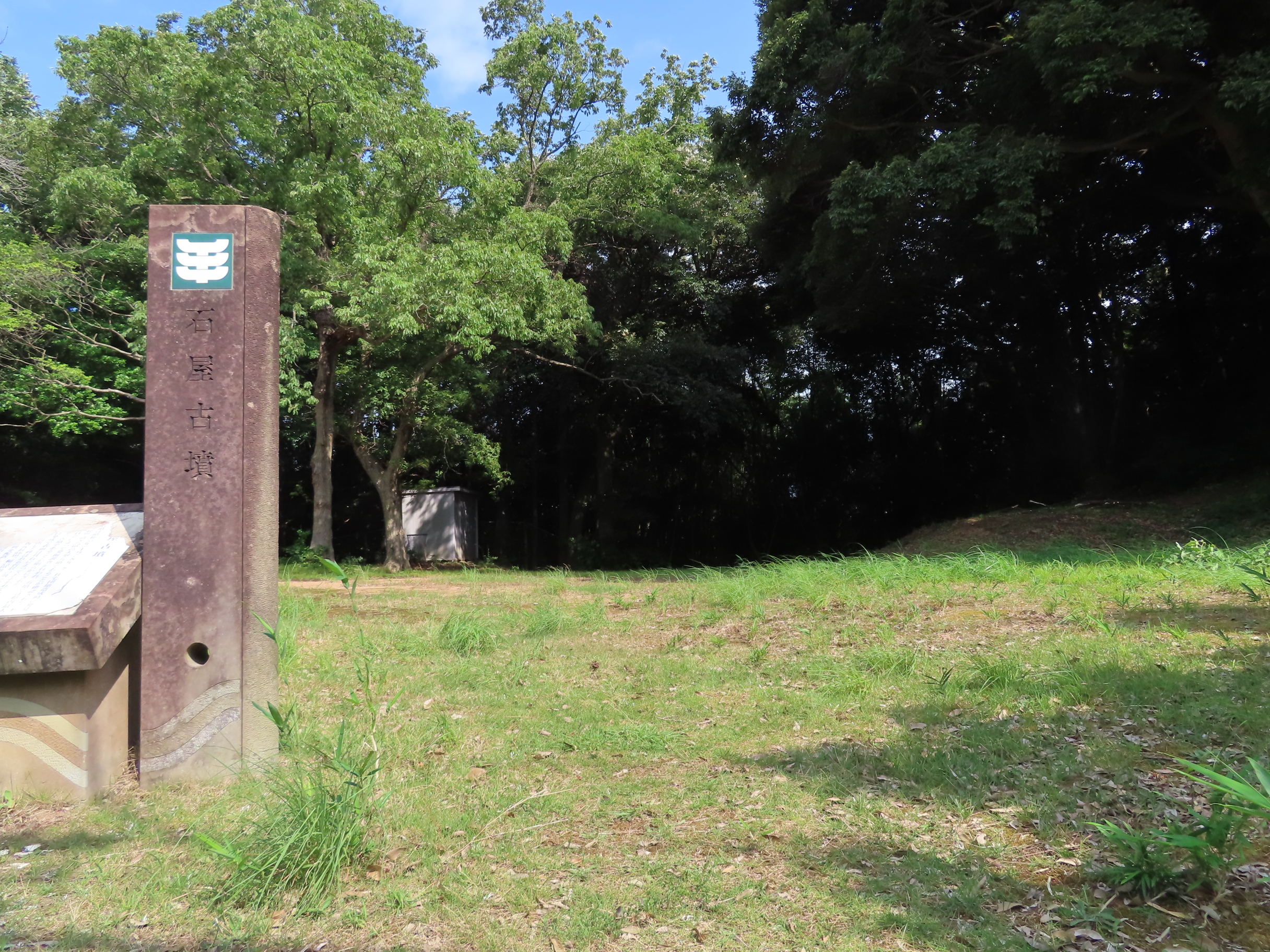
- Ishiya Kofun

- Ishiya Kofun Ishiya Kofun (Japan)
- Interactive map of Ishiya Kofun
- 35°27′03″N 133°06′07″E
- Type: Kofun
- Periods: Kofun period
- Location: Matsue, Shimane, Japan
- Region: San'in region

History
- Built: c.5th century

Site notes
- Public access: Yes (no facilities)

Ishiya Kofun (石屋古墳) is a Kofun period burial mound, located on the border of the Yata-chō and Higashitsuda-chō neighborhoods of the city of Matsue, Shimane in the San'in region of Japan. The tumulus was designated a National Historic Site of Japan in 1979. It is one of the largest rectangular tombs in the San'in region and is in good preservation.

== Overview ==
The Ishiya Kofun is located on the south bank of the Ōhashi River, which connects Lake Shinji and Nakaumi, on a hill about 30 meters above sea level, approximately 2.5 kilometers east-southeast of central Matsue. This area is a key point for water transportation, and an ancient ferry named the "Asakanwatari" that appears in the Izumo-no-kuni Fudoki was at this location.

This rectangular hōfun (方墳)-style burial mound, approximately 37.5 meters by 42 meters, and approximately 7.5 meters in height and is orientated to the southwest. It was discovered in 1978 during construction of a residential area. It has a dry moat over 10 meters wide on the north and south sides. and smaller raised rectangular structures overhanging the moat exist in the north and south. While the northern structure is located on the central axis, the southern structure is located on the west side of the foot of the mound. Such an asymmetry is unusual. Another unusual feature is on the north side: about 5.5 meters away from the foot of the burial mound, there is a row of stones extending in an east–west direction, the purpose of which is unknown. The structure of the burial chamber is uncertain as it has yet to be excavated, but it is a pit-type vertical stone chamber.

The mound was built in two stages, with fukiishi on the slope, and cylindrical haniwa and morning glory-shaped haniwa on the first stage. The fukiishi is andesite, the same stone which was used in the construction of the walls of Matsue Castle. Cylindrical haniwa were also lined up around the top of the structure, and inside these haniwa smaller figurative haniwa in the shapes of horses, people, shields, etc. were discovered, as well as Sue ware pots and utensil stands. Some figurative haniwa are coated with red or green pigments, and many are in a style unique to this site. From the haniwa and Sue ware items, it is believed that the tumulus was built in the he late 5th century, or the middle of the Kofun period. Traditionally, it was thought that haniwa with a variety of shapes appeared in large keyhole-shaped tombs in the Kinai region in the 5th century, but these haniwa have led the Shimane Prefectural Ancient Culture Center to state that the powerful clans of Izumo may have been involved in the construction of large burial mounds in the Kinai region, such as the Daisen Tumulus (the legendary tomb of Emperor Nintoku), where similar clay figures of the same period have been excavated.

The tumulus is located next to Japan National Route 9, about 4.2 kilometers (10 minutes by car) from Matsue Station on the JR West San'in Main Line.

== See also ==
- List of Historic Sites of Japan (Shimane)
