= Daikon Island =

Volcanic island in Shimane Prefecture, Japan

Native name: 大根島 Daikon-jima
- Interactive map of Daikon Island

Geography
- Location: Nakaumi
- Coordinates: 35°29′45.6″N 133°10′15.6″E
- Area: 4.89 km^{2} (1.89 sq mi)
- Length: 3.3 km (2.05 mi)
- Width: 2.2 km (1.37 mi)
- Coastline: 12 km (7.5 mi)
- Highest elevation: 42 m (138 ft)
- Highest point: Mount Ōzuka

Administration
- Japan
- Prefecture: Shimane Prefecture
- City: Matsue

Demographics
- Ethnic groups: Japanese

Daikon Island (大根島, Daikon-jima) is a volcanic island in the middle of Nakaumi, a brackish volcanic lake between Tottori and Shimane prefectures in Japan. Daikon Island is administered as part of Matsue, Shimane Prefecture. Daikon-jima takes its name from the daikon, the large, white East Asian radish. The island was, however, known throughout Japanese history as "Tako-shima", meaning "Octopus Island."

Daikon Island is a shield volcano, a type of volcano composed of fluid lava flows. The island's highest elevation is a small volcano, Mount Ōzuka (42 metres (138 ft)). The base of the island composed of basalt. The surface of the island undulates slightly, and consists of a lava plateau. The surface of the island consists of a 2-meter deep layer of clay composed of volcanic ash. On the eastern end of the Daikon Island in the Osoe district there are lava tubes of up 200 metres (660 ft)). The lava tubes were formed by lava flows over the island. Lava tubes composed of secondary lava flows in the Terazu district of the island. They are designated Natural Monuments of Japan.

Daikon Island was formerly used as a ranch to raise horses for the Emperor. Ginseng and peony cultivation have been active in Daikon Island since the Edo period. In 1981 a land bridge was built between Cape Ōmizaki in Matsue. The island is now connected to the city of Matsue by bus.

== See also ==
- List of Special Places of Scenic Beauty, Special Historic Sites and Special Natural Monuments
