= Hii River =

Hii River 斐伊川
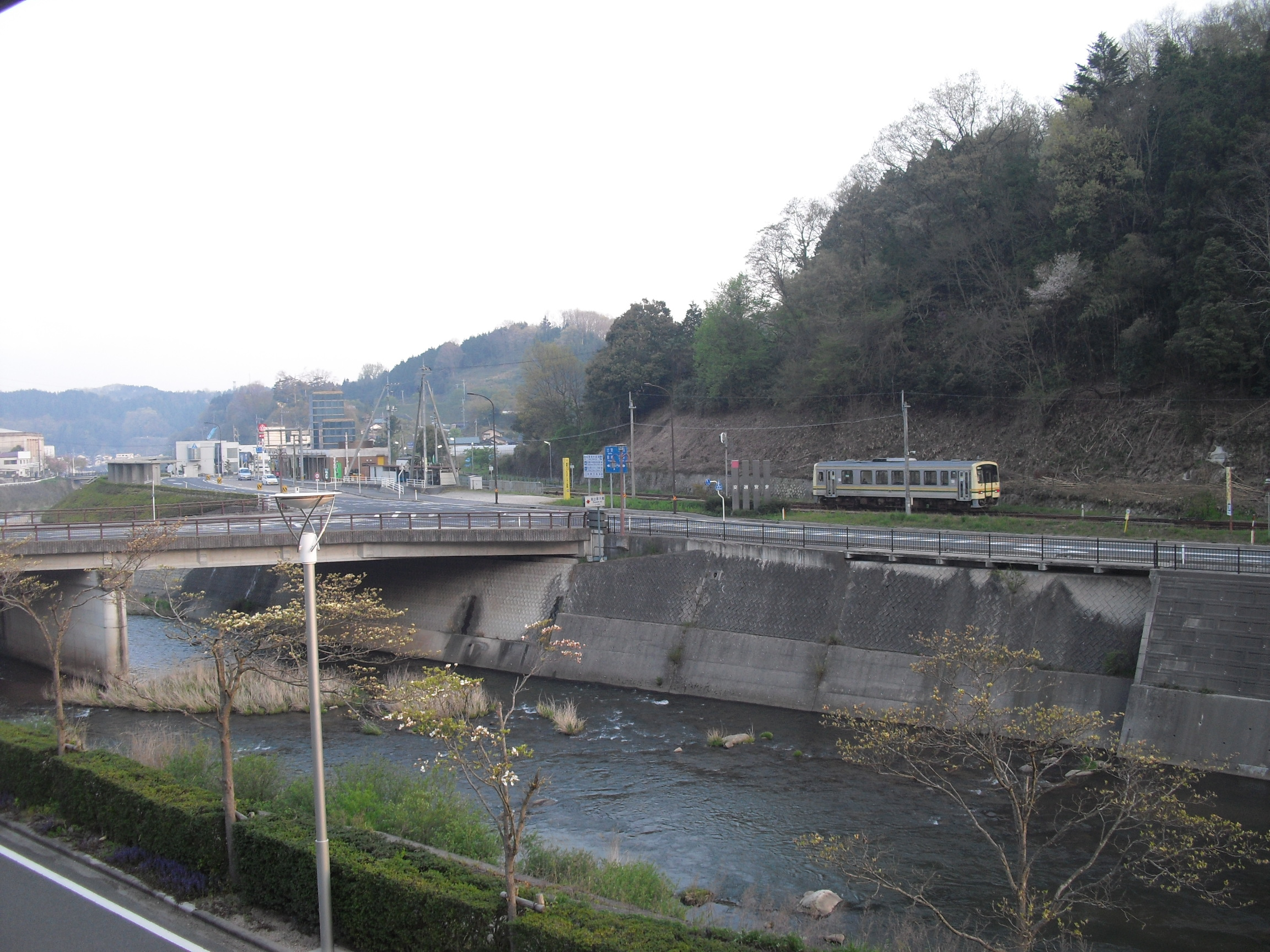
- Hii River in 2010

- Location within Japan

Location
- Country: Japan
- Prefecture: Shimane, Tottori

Physical characteristics
- Source: Mount Sentsū
  - coordinates: 35°09′50″N 133°11′09″E
- Mouth: Miho Bay
  - coordinates: 35°33′15″N 133°16′22″E
- Length: 153 km (95 mi)
- Basin size: 2,070 km^{2} (800 sq mi)
- Discharge
  - location: Ohtsu, Izumo
  - average: 1.4 bn m^{3}/year

The Hii River (斐伊川, Hii-kawa) is a river on the island of Honshu in Shimane Prefecture and Tottori Prefecture, Japan. With a length of 153 km (95 mi) and catchment of 2,540 km^{2} (980 sq mi), it is the largest river in the east of Shimane Prefecture. It flows through the cities of Izumo and Matsue and through the lakes Shinji and Nakaumi and discharges into the Sea of Japan.

In antiquity the river was known as "Izumo-no-okawa" (出雲大川, "The great Izumo river").

The River Hii significantly changed its course and transformed the land several times during last 7 millennia. Alluvial deposits carried by the river joined the Shimane peninsula to the mainland, which may have been represented in the "Kunibiki-shinwa" myth. Since the 17th century it flows into lake Shinji, and since the early 20th century continues to the Sea of Japan. Hii river frequently caused floods in its catchment. On the other hand, it was and currently is an important source of drinking and irrigation water. During the Edo period the upper Hii catchment was the largest iron-producing region in Japan. Nowadays the river is dammed for the production of hydropower. The largest dams are Obara and Hinobori.

== Geography ==
The river's source is located on the slopes of Mount Sentsū, in the town of Okuizumo. The river flows northwards through the Chūgoku Mountains and Yokota Basin (横田盆地). Below Kisuki it joins Mitoya river (三刀屋川). In Izumo city it enters the Izumo plain , where it is connected to Kando River by the Hiikawa River discharge channel. Then it turns eastwards and flows through Lake Shinji and then through lake Nakaumi, discharging through the Sakai channel into Miho-wan bay of Sea of Japan. The part of the river that connects two lakes and crosses Matsue city is called Ohashi River (大橋川).

The Hii river is 153 km (95 mi) long and the catchment area is 2,540 km^{2} (980 sq mi); the population of the catchment is about 500,000. It is 19th longest river in Japan, and 29th largest by its catchment area. It is designated as a Class A river system by the Ministry of Land, Infrastructure, Transport and Tourism (MLIT). The bottom gradient is about 1/160-1/700 in the upper reaches and 1/860-1/1500 in the lower part. The mean annual precipitation is about 2,300 mm (91 in) in the upper reaches and 1,700–1,845 mm (66.9–72.6 in) in the lower reaches, most of it occurring in the southwestern part of the basin. The annual discharge in the midstream (Otsu, Izumo city) is 1.4 bln m^{3}. The main tributaries of Hii are Ai, Ohmaki, Kuno, Mitoya and Akagawa. In addition, rivers Iinashi and Hakuta discharge into lake Nakaumi.

In the upper part of the catchment over 80% of the land is covered by forests and around 10% by rice paddies.

== History and mythology ==
Changes in the course of Hii river and the shorelines of Shimane peninsula and lakes Shinji and Nakaumi during the last 11.000 years. Grey stands for the current shoreline, Hii river is marked by dark blue

During the Last Glacial Maximum, the Shimane Peninsula was fully connected to Honshu. The Old Shinji river flowed in the place of modern lake Shinji and Izumo Plain. About 9000 BC the sea level began to rise and seawater intruded into the low-lying areas in the east and the west ends, between the hilly peninsula and Chūgoku Mountains. During the temperature peak of the warm Atlantic period (early Jomon) the sea probably separated the peninsula almost entirely from the mainland. At that point the Hii river flowed into the Old Shinji Bay, located at the place of modern lake Shinji and Izumo Plain.

Later the sea level receded again. In addition, sediments from Hii and other rivers accumulated in the bay, cutting it off the sea. The final step in this change may have happened as a result of an eruption of Mount Sanbe about 1600 BC and the obstruction of the bay by pyroclastic flow that connected it again to Honshu. Afterwards rivers Hii and Kando discharged into the Kandono-mizuumi lagune and deposited their sediment there.

According to some researchers, this change may have been reflected in the Kunibiki-shinwa ("Land-pulling myth"). It tells the story of the expansion of Izumo land by pulling to it pieces of "land in excess" from neighbouring areas. According to the Izumo-fudoki annals, the local deity Yatsukamizu-omitsuno(-no-mikoto) said: "The country Izumo, of the clouds rising, is a land like a pile of narrow cloth. First the land was made small. Therefore, it ought to be sewn larger". Using a hoe he pulled pieces of land from Shiragi (eastern Silla), Saki Country and other areas and connected them to Izumo to form the Shimane peninsula. The land pulled from Shiragi became Kidzuki Cape, beside which Izumo Taisha shrine is located. Its original name was Kidzuki-oyashiro and it was dedicated to Yatsukamizu-omitsuno. In another local myth the fight of Susanoo against Yamata no Orochi serpent may represent the flood control efforts of people living along Hii.

Till the mid-18th century, after reaching Izumo plain, the Hii turned west and discharged into Taisha Bay of the Sea of Japan. The sediments accumulated in the plain and after large floods in years 1635 and 1639 the river changed its course and it has discharged since then into lake Shinji.

In the 17th and 18th centuries, the mountains in the upper Hii basin became the most important source of iron production from ironsand in the tatara furnaces. For this process a technique called kanna-nagashi (鉄穴流し) was used: channels were built on the slopes, then filled with weathered granite earth. When they were washed with water the lighter earth was pulled away leaving concentrated iron ore (up to 80%) that was collected. In the late Edo era about 80% of iron in Japan was produced in Izumo region. The total amount of sediment resulting from this process that was discharged into the river up to 1950s is estimated at 200,000,000 m^{3} (7.1×10^{9} cu ft). Moreover, the felling of trees needed for the furnaces operation led to deforestation and erosion and increased the amount of sediment.

The accumulation of sediment in the riverbed increased the flood hazard, causing the locals to construct consequently elevated river banks. As a result today the river flows higher than the surrounding land, at some points the riverbed is elevated 3–4 m above the nearby plain. It is an example of a raised-bed river (天上川, tenjougawa), which are common in Japan. The accumulation of sediment in lake Shinji stopped the outflow into lake Nakaumi, transforming the former into a freshwater lake. In order to both prevent flooding and expand the agricultural land, in the 17th - 19th centuries the river was artificially diverted every 40–60 years; that was called the kawa-tagae (川違え) technique. The greatest change came in 1924 with the dredging of Ohashi River that connected again the lakes Shinji and Nakaumi. In addition, the dams built since the 1960s reduced the volume of sediment transported by the river.

== Ecology ==
Since the 1980s till 2010s there was an improvement in the BOD values of Hii water. Since 2003 it did not exceed the required value of 1 mg/L (except one instance in 2015). From 1980s until the early 2000s the total nitrogen concentration has risen while phosphorus concentration decreased.

Since the early 21st century efforts have been undertaken for restoration of wetlands along the river, since these are important for the local ecosystem.

== Floods ==
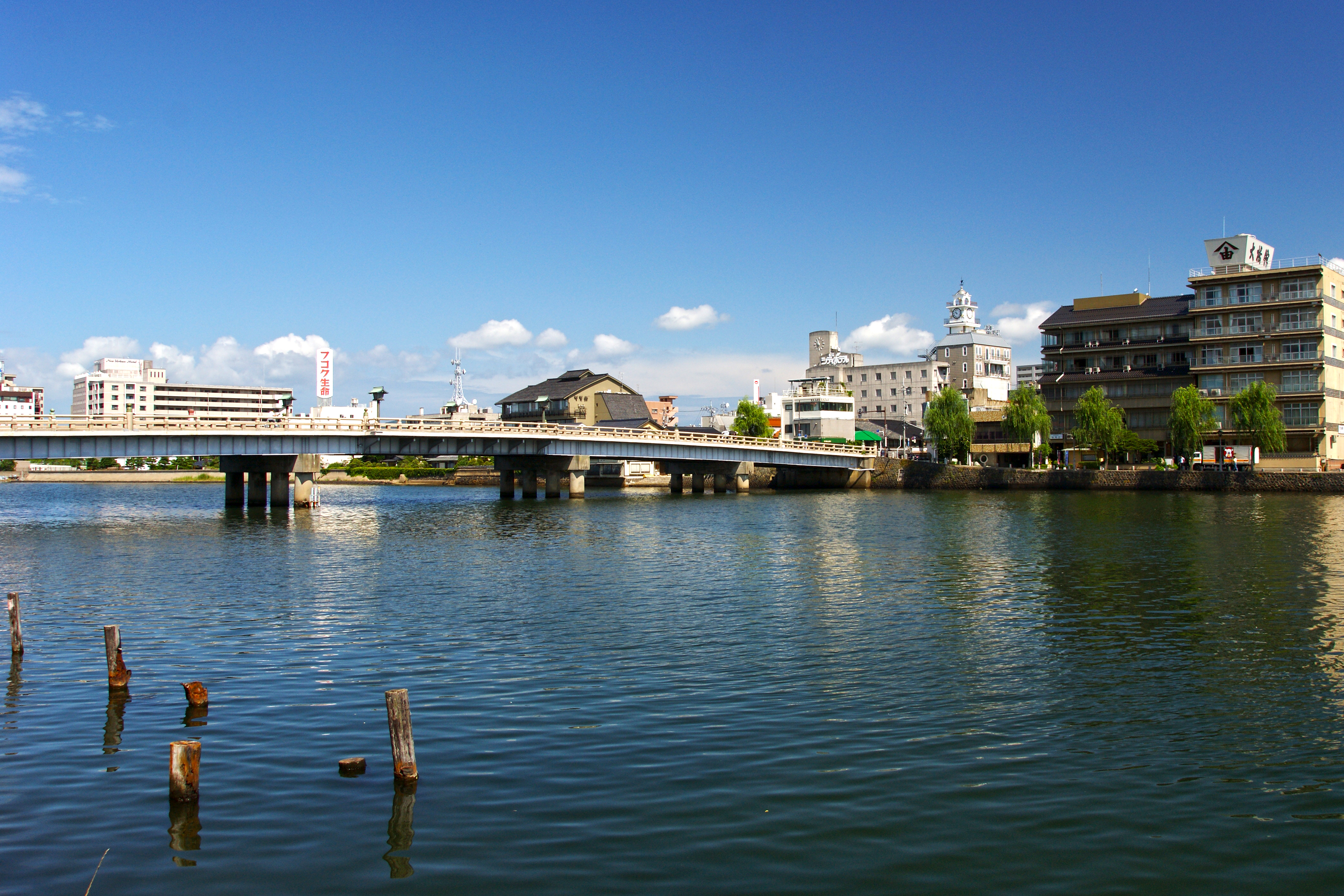
Ohashi river in Matsue city

The first reports of floods along Hii river are from Yoro period (717–723 AD). According to later reports, significant flooding occurred about every 4 years, frequently following typhoons. As an attempt to solve the problem, in 1689 the Tenjin-gawa channel connected lakes Shinji and Nakaumi, and in 1787 the Sada-gawa channel was constructed and linked lake Shinji directly to the sea. However, their outflow was not enough for flood control. In 1832 Hii was linked to lake Shinji by the Shin River, which was constructed to the south of its former course, but accumulation of sediment led to its closure in 1939.

In the 20th and 21st centuries devastating floods occurred in years 1943, 1945, 1972, 2003, and 2006. In 2003 the flood caused the death of 3; 1,460 homes were flooded. The catastrophic 1972 flood resulted in death of 12 and damaged 24,953 homes. Over 70 km^{2} (27 sq mi) was flooded and the area remained submerged for over a week.

In the 1990s works commenced on a vast flood control system, including the construction of a discharge channel connecting Hii and Kando rivers. It diverts the excess water through Kando river into the Taisha Bay Since then the Kando river is regarded as a part of Hii river system. The channel, completed in 2013, received the 2014 Outstanding Civil Engineering Achievement Award. Additional elements of the flood control system are the Obara dam on Hii river and the Shitsumi dam on Kando river, as well as renovation of the Ohashi river.

== Economics ==
In the Middle Ages the river comprised an important transport corridor, through which rice and iron were shipped downstream. Typically the goods were shipped using the takasebune boats up to Shoubara (on lake Shinji), where they could be loaded on larger sailing ships. An additional route was created in the late 17th century with the construction of a canal between Kurihara and Taisha Bay. It that case the goods were shipped to Uryu port at the west end of Shimane peninsula.

70% of rice paddies in Hii catchment are irrigated used its water. Most of the paddies are located in the east of Izumo plain. The river is used to supply drinking water to Matsue and Izumo cities.

The Obara and Hinobori dams are located on the river. They are the main obstacles for fish migration on Hii. The Obara dam impounds the 60 million m^{3} large Sakura-Orochi lake that is used for drinking water supply, irrigation, flood control and recreation. In total there 14 hydropower plants on the Hii river, which together generate up to 55000 kWh of electricity.

Downstream of the dams ayu (the main fishery resource) and carp are caught in the river. The catches are smaller compared to other rivers in the prefecture and to lakes Shinji and Nakaumi.

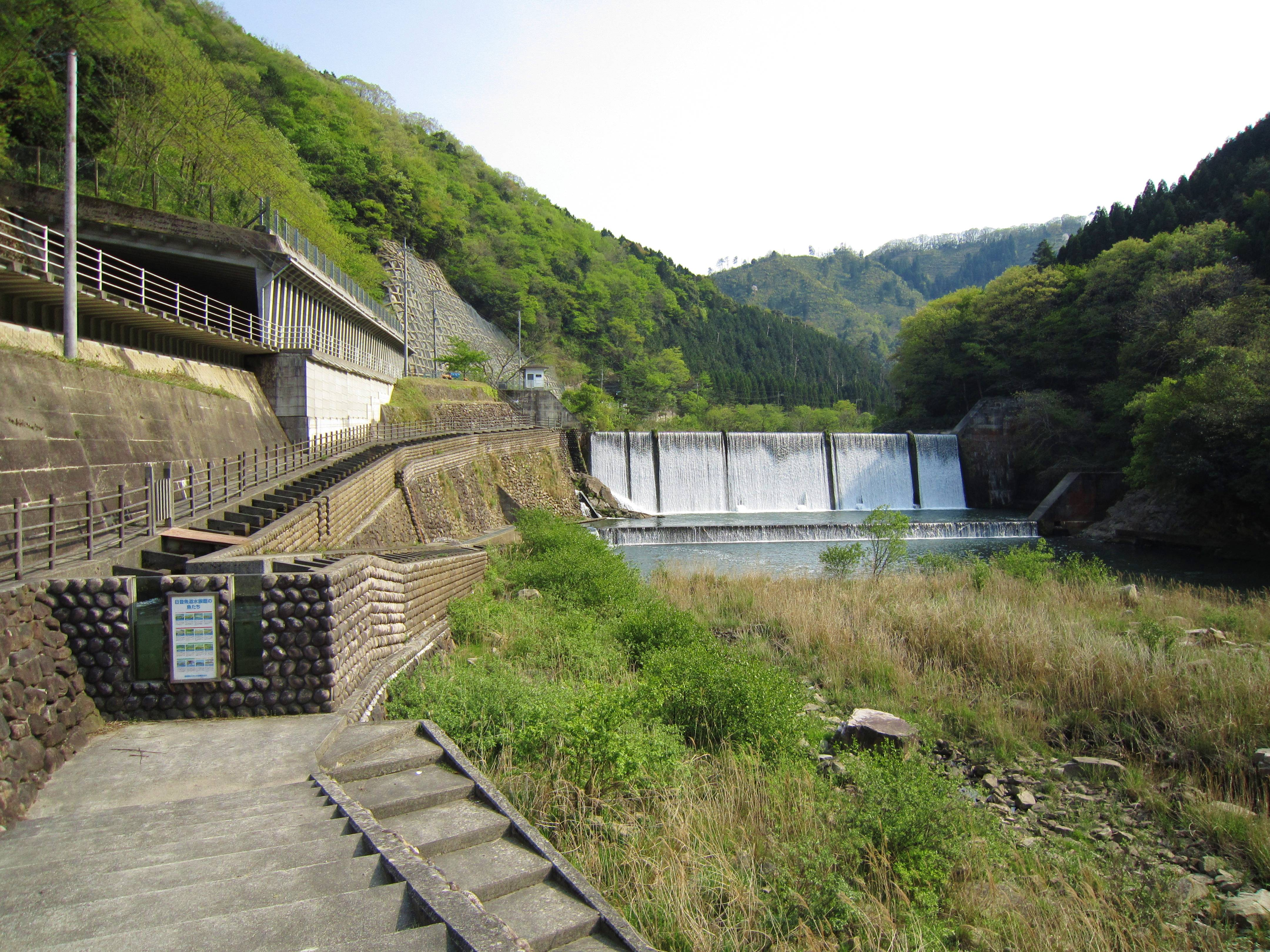
Hinobori dam

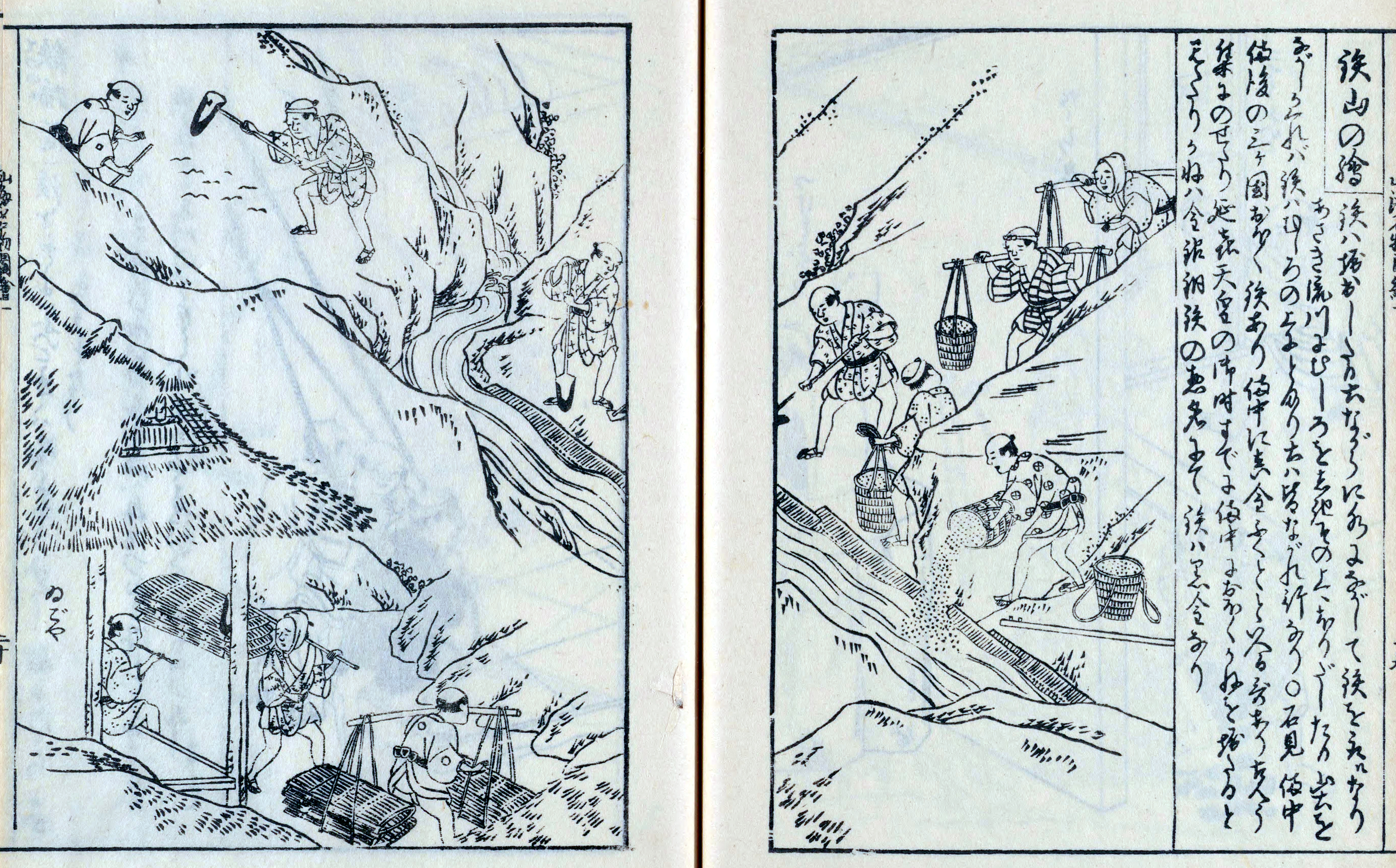
Iron production using the kanna-nagashi technique

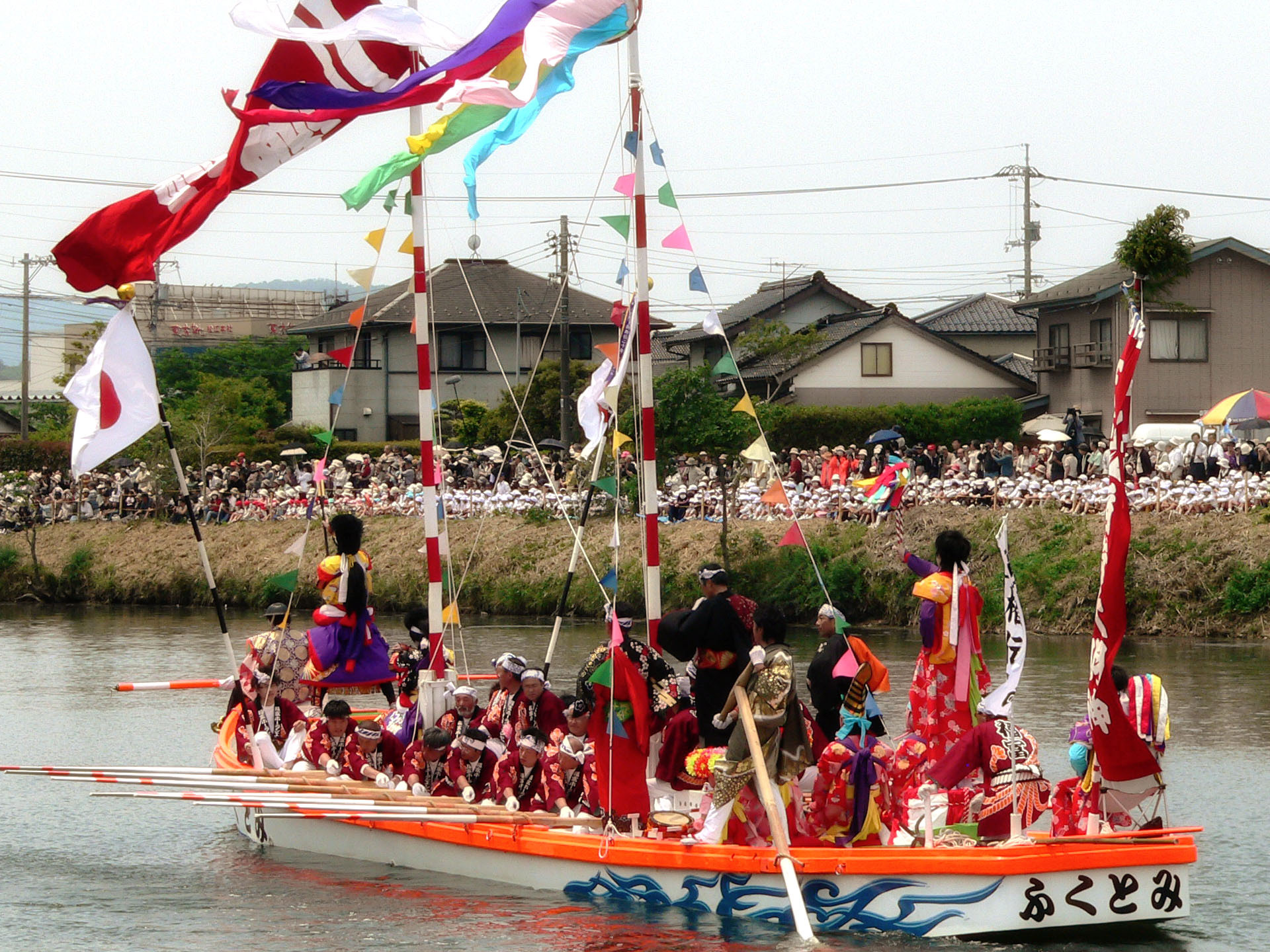
A shinto matsuri in Matsue city

Hii discharge channel

== Tourism ==
In many locations the riverbanks are a popular tourist destination. The riverbanks in Mitoya (Unnan) and Kisuki are famous for sakura blossoms. The Horanenya matsuri (shinto festival) is held every 10 years on the Ohashi river in Matsue. During the festival the shintai of Jozan-Inari shrine is shipped on a boat. It is one of three major ship festivals of Japan.
