= Eshima Ohashi Bridge =

Japanese rigid-frame bridge

Eshima Ohashi Bridge 江島大橋
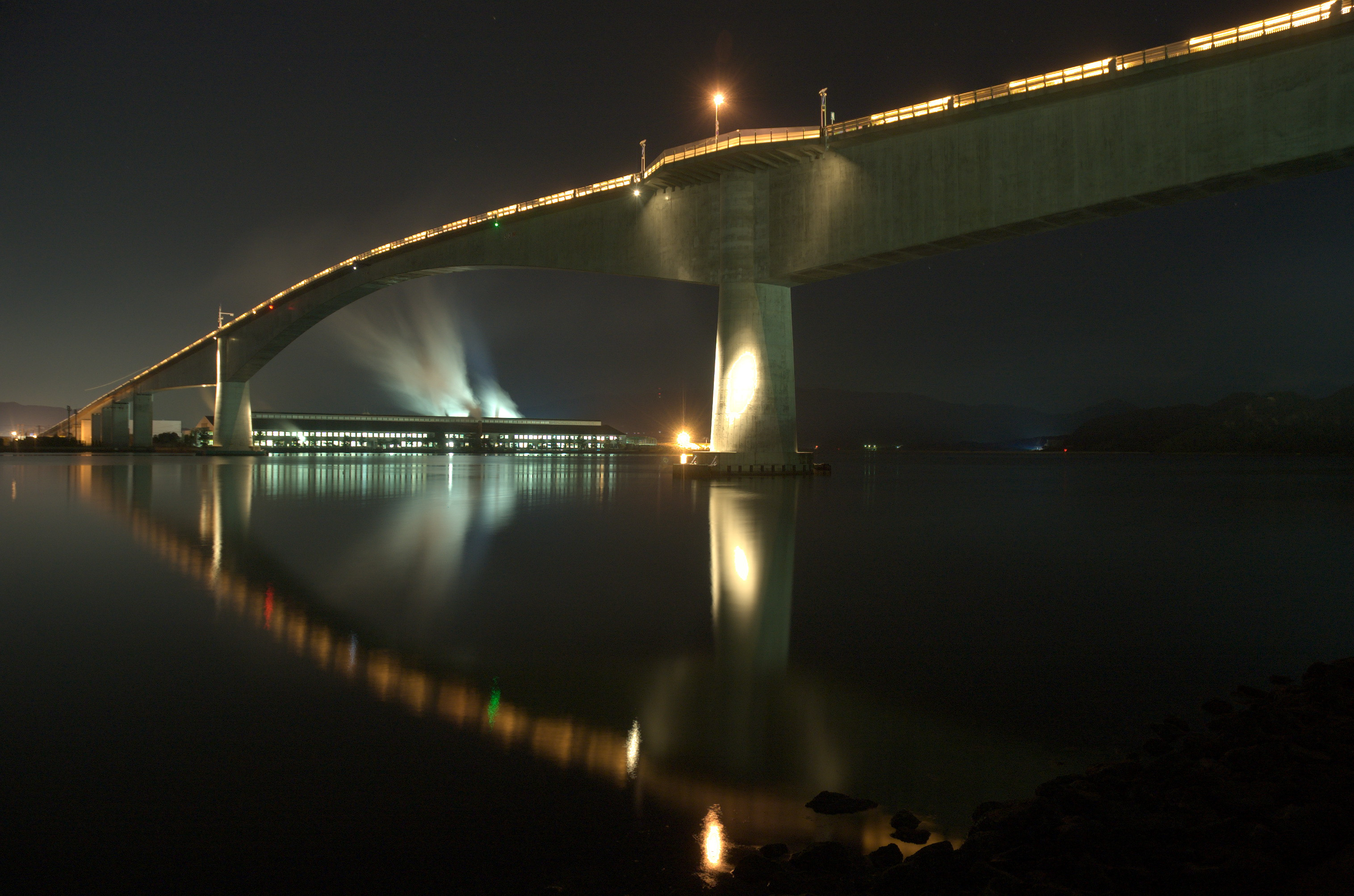
- The Eshima Ohashi Bridge from the side
- Coordinates: 35.519167°N 133.2°E
- Crosses: Nakaumi
- Locale: Shimane and Tottori prefectures
- Other name: "Roller Coaster Bridge"
- Maintained by: Sakaiminato management association

Characteristics
- Total length: 1.7 km (1.1 mi)
- Width: 11.3 m (37 ft)
- Height: 44.7 m (147 ft)
- Longest span: 250 m (820 ft)

History
- Construction start: 1997
- Construction end: 2004

Location
- Interactive map of Eshima Ohashi Bridge

The Eshima Ohashi Bridge (Japanese: 江島大橋, Hepburn: Eshima Ōhashi; "Great Bridge of Eshima [Island]") is a rigid-frame bridge in Japan that connects Matsue, Shimane Prefecture, and Sakaiminato, Tottori Prefecture, over Nakaumi lake. It was built from 1997 to 2004, and it is the largest rigid-frame bridge in Japan and the third largest in the world. Images of the bridge have been widely circulated on the internet, owing to its seemingly steep nature when photographed from a distance with a telephoto lens, but in actuality, it has a less pronounced, 6.1% gradient in the side of Shimane and a 5.1% gradient in the side of Tottori.

Eshima Ohashi Bridge replaced the previous drawbridge, since traffic was obstructed often by ships for about 7 to 8 minutes, only vehicles under 14 tons were allowed and only 4,000 vehicles could cross it per day.

== Overview ==
- Starting point: Wataricho, Sakaiminato City, Tottori Prefecture
- End point: Ejima, Yatsuka-cho, Matsue City, Shimane Prefecture
- Total length: 1.7 km (1.1 mi) (bridge section 1,446.2 m (4,745 ft))
- Width: 11.3 m (37 ft)
- Gradient: Shimane side 6.1%, Tottori side 5.1%
- Number of lanes: 2 lanes
- Speed limit: 40 km/h (25 mph)
- Total construction cost: 22.8 billion yen
- 24 hour traffic: 14,905 vehicles

== Structure ==
The structure is a prestressed concrete (PC) five-span continuous hinged rigid-frame box girder bridge. To ensure smooth passage of ships under the girder, and for construction and earthquake resistance reasons, the bridge has a gradient of 6.1% on the Shimane side and 5.1% on the Tottori side, rising to a height of 44.7 m (147 ft). With a central span of 250 m (820 ft), it is the second longest girder bridge in Japan as of 2014, the longest concrete bridge in Japan, and the third longest PC rigid-frame bridge in the world.

== History ==
Previously, a road bridge built over the Nakaura Water Gate, located just to the south, connected Sakaiminato with Eshima, which could only be reached by boat until then, and was used by approximately 14,000 vehicles daily. However, because the area over the lock was built as a drawbridge, traffic was cut off for about 7–8 minutes when ships passed, creating a traffic hurdle, and large vehicles over 14 tons could not pass through. Therefore, Eshima Ohashi Bridge was built to solve the traffic problems at Nakaura Water Gate. In conjunction with this, work to remove Nakaura Water Gate began around October 2005, and was nearly completed in March 2009.

== Remarks ==
- The Ohashi River upstream of Lake Nakaumi is a port area under the Port and Harbor Act of Matsue Port, and ships of up to 5,000 tons can pass through it, so many of the bridges in the area, including the Eshima Ohashi Bridge, have steep gradients. The Nakaumi Ohashi Bridge (Matsue City, Shimane Prefecture) at the mouth of the Ohashi River has a gradient of 7%, even steeper than the Eshima Ohashi Bridge, and the Sakaisuido Ohashi Bridge at the Sakaisuido Strait, which serves as an entrance to the open sea, has a maximum gradient of 7.25%.
- A commercial for Daihatsu Motor 's Tanto Custom (LA600S model) (starring Go Ayano and Etsushi Toyokawa ) that began airing on December 28, features the Ejima Bridge to demonstrate its driving performance, in order to disprove the common belief that " light cars (especially heavy super-height models ) are weak on slopes." In the commercial, the bridge's steepness makes it appear as if the driver is "pedaling on the slope." The use of CG was not considered when the commercial was made, powerful impact.
- The Road Structure Act has set a maximum gradient of 12% since 1971, and the gradient of 6.1% on the Shimane side is only half of the standard, or about 3 degrees. For this reason, even light vehicles do not need to press the accelerator deeply when driving on the road.
- The reason why the Eshima Bridge appears extremely steep, like the uphill slope of a roller coaster, is because of the compression effect that occurs when viewing it with a telephoto lens from Daikon Island on the opposite shore; the slope does not appear to be as steep from the foot of the bridge.

== Gallery ==
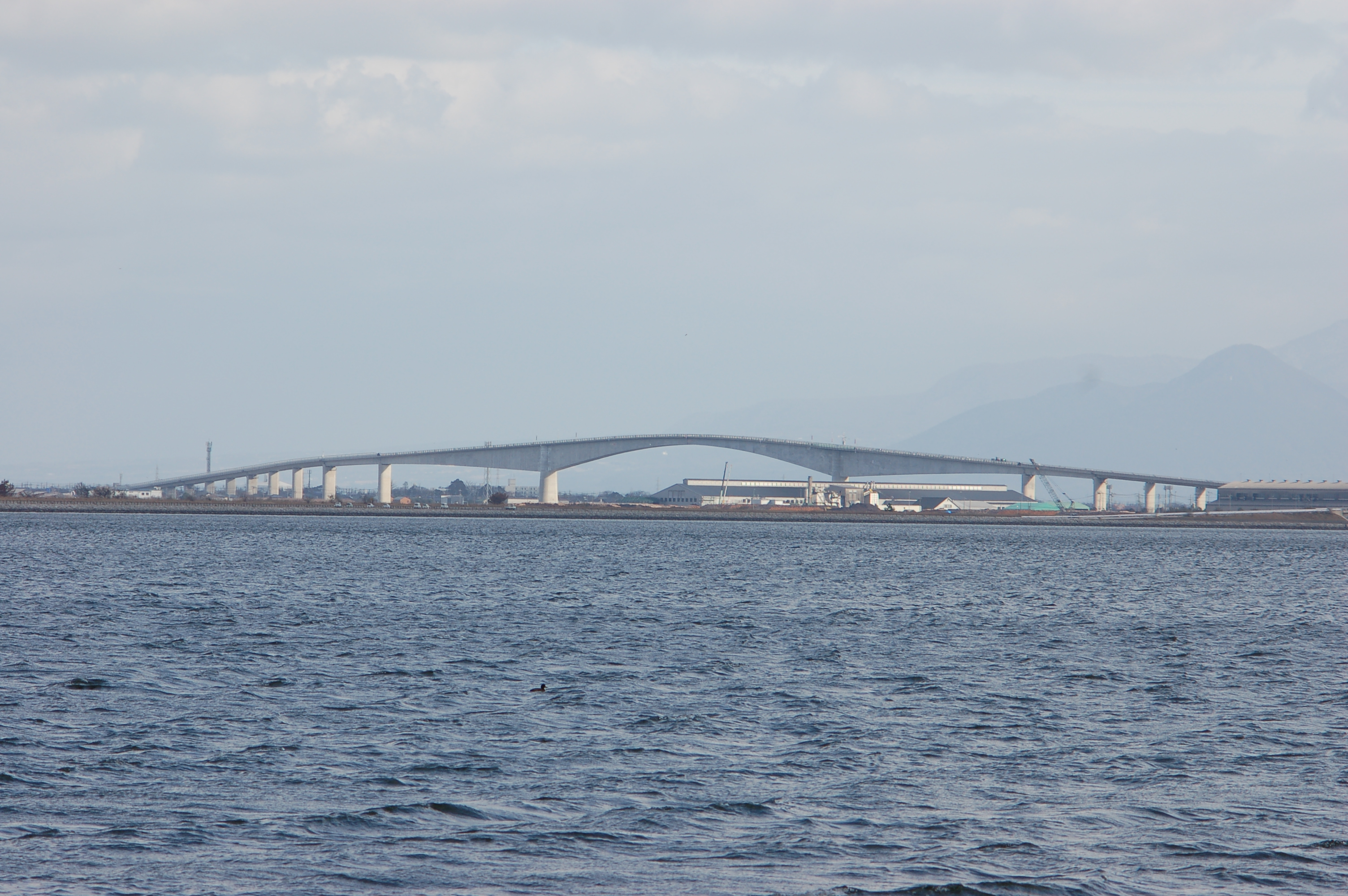
Bridge spans

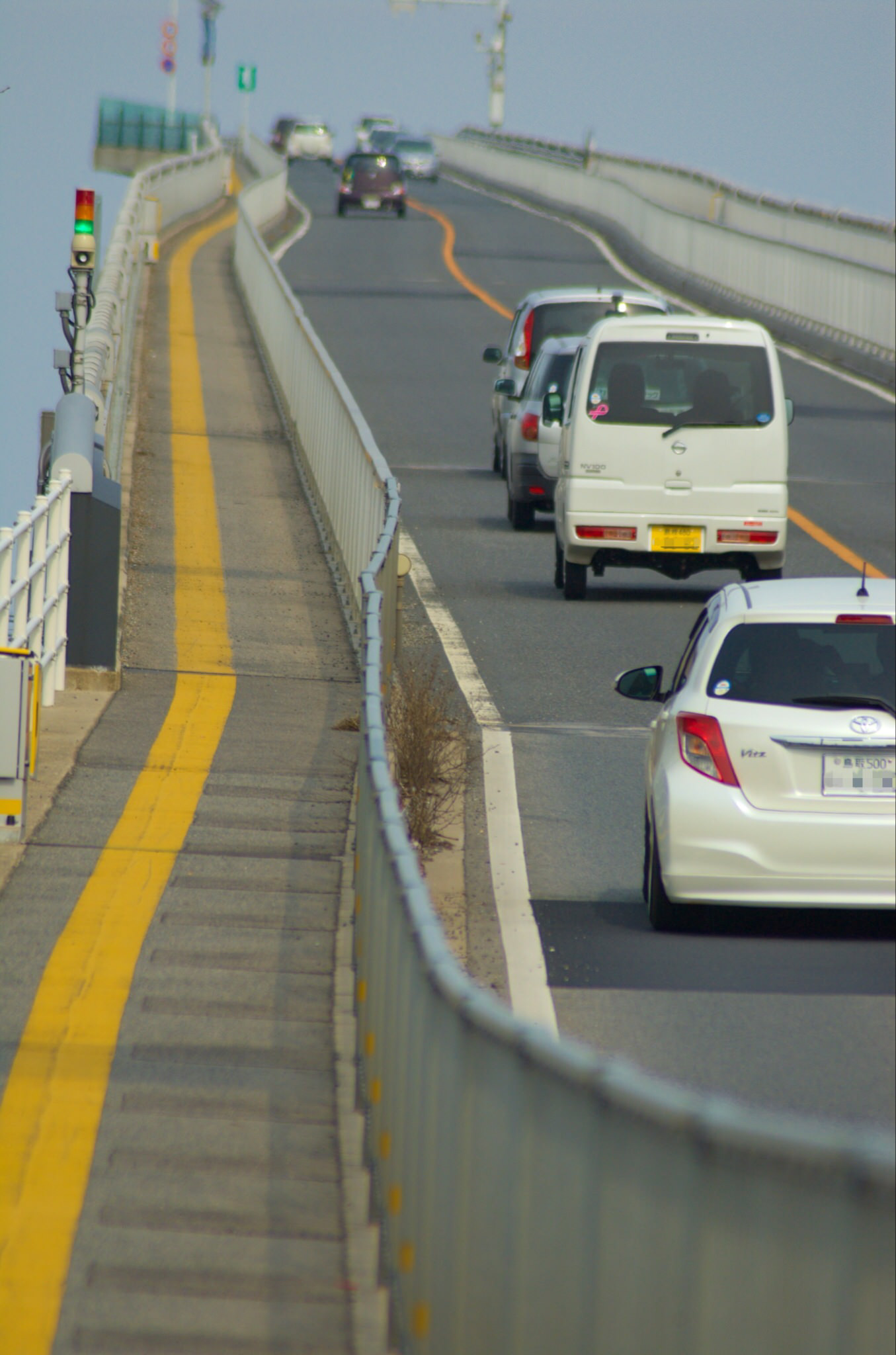
Incline

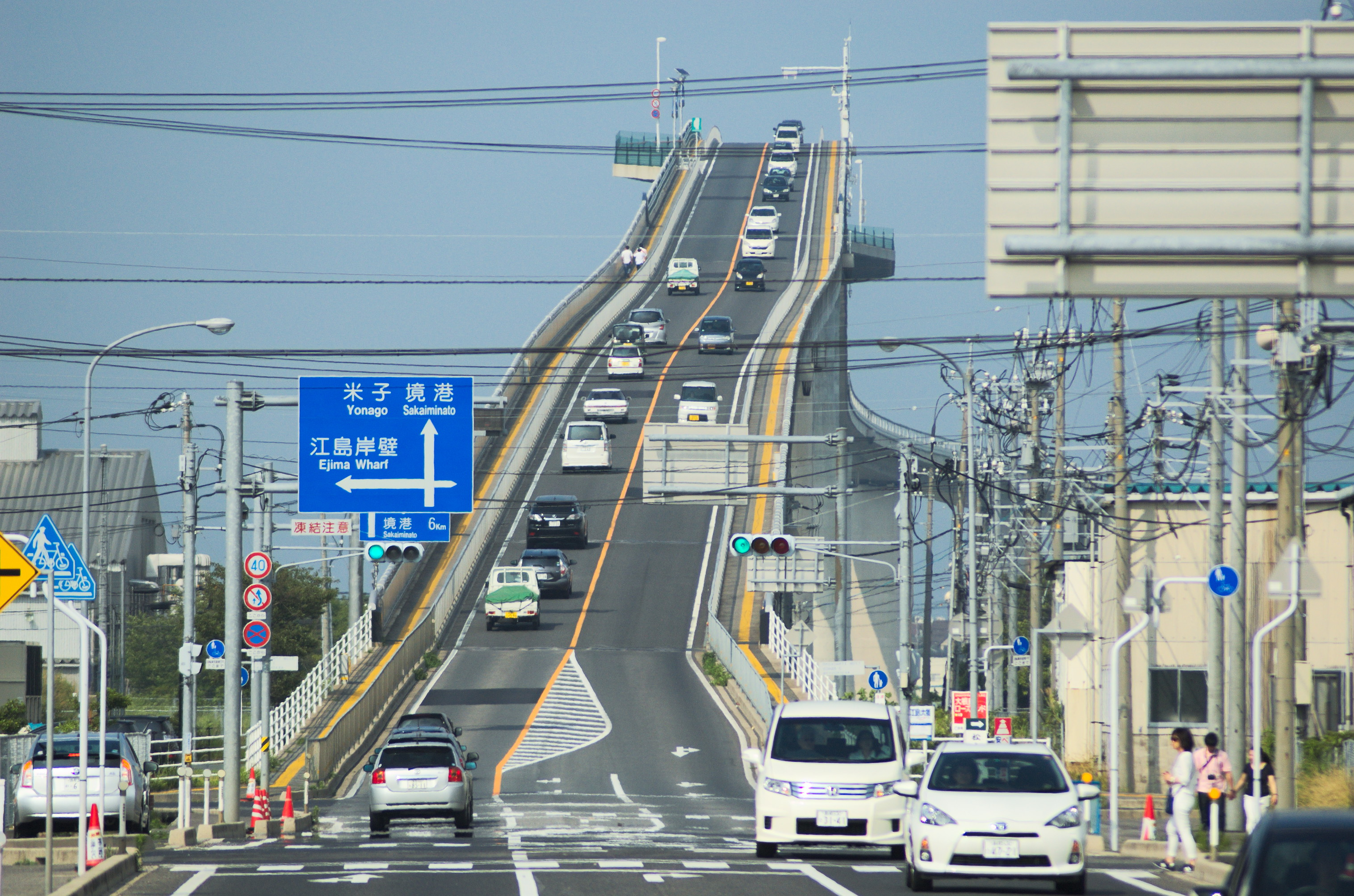
Looking towards the bridge entrance from the Shimane Prefecture side
