= Writing and Literacy in Chinese, Korean and Japanese =

1995 book by Insup Taylor and M. Martin Taylor

Writing and Literacy in Chinese, Korean and Japanese (Victor Mair uses the acronym WLCKJ) is a 1995 book by Insup Taylor and M. Martin Taylor, published by John Benjamins Publishing Company.

Kim Ainsworth-Darnell, in The Journal of the Association of Teachers of Japanese, wrote that the work "is intended as an introduction for the Western reader to the writing systems of East Asia." William C. Hannas of Georgetown University described it as "the first sustained treatment of writing in East Asia." Nobu Akamatsu of Kochi University stated that the book was intended for "novices from various backgrounds" rather than academics with extensive experience related to East Asia. Journal of Adolescent & Adult Literacy wrote that the book was not only intended for "the general public" but also for "academic readers". Kathryn Allen of the University of Reading wrote that the comparing of the writing systems of Chinese, Japanese, and Korean was the more important aspect than the overview of the languages.

In 2014 a revised version was published.

== Background ==
Insup Taylor, who was born in Korea, and employed by the University of Toronto, is in the psycholinguistic field. She studied East Asian languages and did the bulk of the work. She has fluency in both Korean and Japanese.

The co-author is her husband.

The book used primary sources written in each of the three languages as well as ones in English.

== Contents ==
The book has an introductory chapter about linguistics and writing systems. Beyond that, it has a section on each of the three languages: Chinese is in Part 1, Korean is in Part 2, and Japanese is in Part 3. Each section has an initial chapter with background information on the language, followed by one or more chapters about writing systems for that particular language and discussion on why each system still uses Chinese characters; each also has a bibliography for that section. The book does not have information on dialects. On Vietnam it mentions the country on a single page but has no further discussion.

The section on Korean also discusses the role of Hangul, and of Hanja (spelled "Hancha"), as well as attempts to completely discontinue the latter and why such never happened. The section on Japanese also discusses hiragana and katakana, as well as mora and its role in haiku.

The book has information from experiments in the psycholinguistic field. It also includes anecdotes and quotes.

The book argues that Koreans should again begin to use Chinese characters.

== Reception ==
The reviews below consider the original printings and not the revised version in 2014.

Mair stated that he was unclear on how much of a role each of the co-authors had in the work. He also criticized the "a sizable number of factual and interpretive errors" and "typographical and grammatical mistakes on almost every other page of the book," as well as a "sophomoric, preachy style and occasionally unidiomatic English".

William J. Poser of the University of Pennsylvania wrote that "Overall, this is a valuable book." Poster stated that the book "is not the best source" for people wanting details on phonology due to the book's "weakness" in that arena, and Poser stated the "technical" details are weak. He praised the content about "cultural, educational, and psychological aspects of writing".

Ainsworth-Darnell argued that the book is "poorly organized and difficult to follow" and that it is not "a truly useful introductory text." Ainsworth-Darnell argued some of the explanations the book uses "often[...]are more puzzling than the truth." She also criticized the "lack of objectivity and the Sinocentric bias that pervades the discussion of Japanese."

Roy Andrew Miller stated that the work uses "an eager, naïve, and doggedly enthusiastic first-person narrative style that at first amuses, but soon thereafter wearies, the reader." Miller concluded the book was "a point d'appui for interminable digressions" on obvious aspects of Asia.

Hannas stated that in regards to the book's concept that Chinese characters are advantageous in writing systems, each argument in favor "either is spurious or is beneficial only in the trivial sense that the characters solve problems that their own use has created."

Mary S. Erbaugh of City University of Hong Kong praised the "depth, scope" and "richness" of the underlying primary sourcing.

T. H. Barrett, in Bulletin of the School of Oriental and African Studies, stated that much of the content is not revelatory but "firmly potted", that the book is "a bibliographic equivalent...] of a fast-food outlet" which would be "wholesome" and that "cannot be judged by gourmet standards".

Jane Chu-mei Kuo and Suguru Akutsu, both of American Graduate School of International Management, stated that the work "is invaluable" for its information on "the impact written characters have had on the education systems and literacy in these countries". Kuo and Akutsu argued that the authors "went too far in trying to teach the languages to the readers." and that their information on language structure and phonetic systems is too detailed for a work that is supposed to be for the non-specialist reader. Kuo and Akutsu argued that the book should have had sections based on the elements common to the languages instead of sections by language, as such would be " a more direct comparison" that would "keep the reader engaged in the examination." The writing system being the first section, comparing and contrasting levels of literacy, styles of education, and phonetics, and then reasons why the writing style is advantageous.

Janet S. (Shibamoto) Smith of University of California Davis described the book as "a valiant first attempt" but that "organizational problems, excessive repetition, and more-than-occasional inaccuracies make the work hard to recommend."

Allen described the book as "a valuable contribution to understanding" Chinese, Japanese, and Korean, and which is "quite readable in its entirety yet could be used as a reference on specific points."

Toshio Ohori (大堀 壽夫, Ōhori Toshio) of the University of Tokyo described the book as "an excellent account of writing and literacy" that he "strongly recommended". Ohori argued that at times the book should have directly used Chinese, Japanese, and/or Korean text instead of romanized versions of such.

Christopher Seely of the University of Canterbury stated that overall, it is "a useful work" in its field despite stylistic errors. criticized the work for frequently having an "unacceptably loose or otherwise inappropriate" "mode of expression", and for having "contradictory, misguided, or confusing" statements as well as "inadequate correction of English expression."
