= Nelly Naumann =

German Japanologist (1922–2000)

Nelly Naumann (20 December 1922 – 29 September 2000) was a German scholar of Japanese studies with a specialisation in Japanese mythology and folklore and Shinto.

== Life and career ==
Naumann was born Thusnelda Joch in Lörrach, where she was educated at the Hebel Gymnasium, completing her Abitur in 1941. She studied Japanese and Chinese studies, ethnology and philosophy at the University of Vienna. World War II delayed the completion of her dissertation, "Das Pferd in Sage und Brauchtum Japans" (The Horse in Japan's Mythology and Traditions) until 1946, when she became the first woman to receive a doctorate in Japanese studies from that university.

After completing her doctorate, Naumann married a Chinese fellow student and moved to Shanghai until 1954. She then returned to Germany after her divorce and worked for the Bavarian State Library in Munich. From 1966 to 1977 she taught at the universities in Bochum, Münster and Freiburg. In 1970 she completed her Habilitation with a dissertation entitled "Das Umwandeln des Himmelspfeilers" (The Circumambulation of the Pillar of Heaven); she was Professor of Japanese Studies at Freiburg from 1973 until her retirement in 1985. She continued to publish; her comprehensive works Die einheimische Religion Japans (1988–94) and Die Mythen des alten Japan (1996) were both published after she retired. A Festschrift in her honour appeared in 1993.

She died in Freiburg in 2000.

== Research and publications ==
Naumann's approach was that of the Vienna School of Art History, in which cross-cultural comparisons are used to deepen insight into a particular culture, in contrast to the then prevailing Japanese school of interpretation which considered Japanese heritage in isolation. Miyata Noboru wrote in 1989 on the importance of her broad viewpoint to Japanese studies, and a committee of Japanese folklorists has been formed to publish her works in Japanese. She was also unusual in her ability to understand both Japanese and Chinese works, and in the breadth of her view of ancient Japanese religion and myth, which she saw as encompassing some 2,000 years. She drew on iconographic as well as textual evidence. She did not do fieldwork, but nonetheless was one of the most important non-Japanese contributors to her field.

Naumann's primary focus was the ancient, pre-Buddhist myths and religion of Japan, but she also published an anthology of classical Japanese literature in translation, Die Zauberschale (1973, with Wolfram Naumann) and in her last years was working on Japanese shamanism with the linguist Roy A. Miller.
