= Roy Andrew Miller =

American linguist (1924–2014)

- Miller in Kyōto in 1982; (Photograph by William Schoen)
- Born: September 5, 1924; Winona, Minnesota
- Died: August 22, 2014 (aged 89); Honolulu, Hawaii

Academic background
- Education: Gustavus Adolphus College (B.A.); Columbia University (M.A., Ph.D.)

Academic work
- Discipline: Linguist
- Institutions: International Christian University; Yale University; University of Washington

Roy Andrew Miller (September 5, 1924 – August 22, 2014) was an American linguist best known as the author of several books on Japanese language and linguistics, and for his advocacy of Korean and Japanese as members of the proposed Altaic language family.

== Biography ==
Miller was born in Winona, Minnesota, on September 5, 1924, to Andrew and Jessie (née Eickelberry) Miller. In 1953, he completed a Ph.D. in Chinese and Japanese at Columbia University in New York. Long a student of languages, his early work in the 1950s was largely with Chinese and Tibetan. For example, in 1969 he wrote the Encyclopædia Britannica entry on the Tibeto-Burman languages of South Asia.

He was Professor of Linguistics at the International Christian University in Tokyo from 1955 to 1963. Subsequently he taught at Yale University; between 1964 and 1970, he was chairman of the department of East and South Asian Languages and Literatures. From 1970 until 1989 he held a similar post at the University of Washington in Seattle. He then taught in Europe, mainly in Germany and Scandinavia.

He wrote extensively on the Japanese language, from A Japanese Reader (1963) and The Japanese Language (1967) to Japanese and the Other Altaic Languages (1971) and Nihongo: In Defense of Japanese (1986). He later broadened his scope by linking Korean both to Japanese and Altaic, most notably in Languages and History: Japanese, Korean, and Altaic (1996).

On the occasion of his 75th birthday, Professors Karl Menges and Nelly Naumann prepared a Festschrift highlighting his career and including articles on Altaic languages.

== Selected works ==
=== Books ===
- 1967a. The Japanese Language. Tokyo: Charles E. Tuttle.
- 1971. Japanese and the Other Altaic Languages. Chicago: University of Chicago Press. ISBN 0-226-52719-0.
- 1975. The Footprints of the Buddha: An Eighth-Century Old Japanese Poetic Sequence, New Haven (CT): American Oriental Society. ISBN 978-0-940-49058-1
- 1976. Studies in the Grammatical Tradition in Tibet. Amsterdam: John Benjamins.
- 1980. Origins of the Japanese Language: Lectures in Japan during the Academic Year 1977–78. Seattle: University of Washington Press. ISBN 0-295-95766-2.
- 1982. Japan's Modern Myth: The Language and Beyond. Tokyo: John Weatherhill Inc. ISBN 0-8348-0168-X.
- 1986. Nihongo: In Defence of Japanese. London: Athlone Press. ISBN 0-485-11251-5.
- 1993. Prolegomena to the First Two Tibetan Grammatical Treatises. (Wiener Studien zur Tibetologie und Buddhismuskunde 30.) Vienna: Arbeitskreis für Tibetische und Buddhistische Studien Universität Wien.
- 1996. Languages and History: Japanese, Korean and Altaic. Oslo: Institute for Comparative Research in Human Culture. ISBN 974-8299-69-4.

=== Articles ===
- 1955a. "Studies in spoken Tibetan I: Phonemics". Journal of the American Oriental Society 75: 46–51.
- 1955c. "Notes on the Lhasa dialect of the early ninth century". Oriens 8: 284–291.
- 1955d. "The significance for comparative grammar of some ablauts in the Tibetan number-system". T'oung-pao 43: 287–296.
- 1955e. "The Independent Status of Lhasa dialect within Central Tibetan". Orbis 4.1: 49–55.
- 1956. "Segmental diachronic phonology of a Ladakh (Tibetan) dialect". Zeitschrift der Deutschen Morganländischen Gesellschaft 106: 345–362.
- 1956. "The Tibeto-Burman ablaut system". Transactions of the International Conference of Orientalists in Japan / Kokusai Tōhō Gakusha Kaigi kiyō 1: 29–56.
- 1957. "The phonology of the Old Burmese vowel system as seen in the Myazedi inscription". Transactions of the International Conference of Orientalists in Japan / Kokusai Tōhō Gakusha Kaigi kiyō 2: 39–43.
- 1962. "The Si-tu Mahapandita on Tibetan phonology". 湯浅八郎博士古稀記念論文集 / Yuasa Hachirō hakushi koki kinen ronbunshu / To Dr. Hachiro Yuasa; A Collection of Papers Commemorating His Seventieth Anniversary, 921–933. Tokyo: 国際基督教大学 / Kokusai Kirisutokyō Daigaku.
- 1966. "Early evidence for vowel harmony in Tibetan". Language 42: 252–277.
- 1967b. "Old Japanese phonology and the Korean–Japanese relationship".
- 1967c. "Some problems in Tibetan transcription of Chinese from Tun-huang". Monumenta Serica 27: 123–148 (publ. 1969).
- 1976. "The Relevance of Historical Linguistics for Japanese Studies". The Journal of Japanese Studies 2.2: 335-388.
- 1977. "The 'Spirit' of the Japanese Language". The Journal of Japanese Studies 3.2: 251-298.
- 1978, "Is Tibetan genetically related to Japanese?", in: Proceedings of the Csoma de Körös memorial Symposium, ed. L. Ligeti, Budapest 1978, pp. 295–312.)
- 2002. "The Middle Mongolian vocalic hiatus". Acta Orientalia Academiae Scientiarum Hungaricae 55.1–3: 179–205.
- 2008 "The Altaic Aorist in *-Ra in Old Korean". Lubotsky, Alexander, ed. Evidence and counter-evidence : essays in honour of Frederik Kortlandt Amsterdam: Rodopi. (Studies in Slavic and general linguistics; 32–33) 267–282.

=== Reviews ===
- 1955b. Review of 稻葉正就 Inaba Shōju, チベット語古典文法学 / Chibettogo koten bunpōgaku [Classical Tibetan Language Grammatical Studies] Kyoto: 法藏館 Hōzōkan, 1954 (昭和 Shōwa 29). Language 31: 481–482.
- 1968. Review of András Róna-Tas, Tibeto-Mongolica: The Loanwords of Mongour and the Development of the Archaic Tibetan Dialects (Indo-Iranian Monographs 7), The Hague: Mouton, 1966. In Language 44.1: 147–168.
- 1970. Review of R. Burling’s Proto-Lolo-Burmese. Indo-Iranian Journal 12 (1970), 146–159.
- 1974. "Sino-Tibetan: Inspection of a Conspectus". Journal of the American Oriental Society 94.2: 195–209.
- 1982. "Linguistic issues in the study of Tibetan Grammar". Wiener Zeitschrift für die Kunde Südasiens und Archiv für indische Philosophie 26: 86–116.
- 1994. "A new grammar of written Tibetan". Review of Stephen Beyer, The Classical Tibetan Language, Albany: State University of New York Press, 1992. Journal of the American Oriental Society 114.1: 67–76.
- 1998, Miller, Roy Andrew; Taylor, Insup; Taylor, M. Martin (July–September 1998). "Reviewed Work: Writing and Literacy in China, Korea and Japan by Insup Taylor, M. Martin Taylor". Journal of the American Oriental Society. 118 (3): 431–433. doi:10.2307/606087. JSTOR 606087.
- 2001 Review of Philip Denwood, "Tibetan", (London Oriental and African Language Library, vol. 3). Philadelphia: John Benjamins, 1999. Journal of the American Oriental Society 121.1:125–128.
