= Nakaumi =

Lake in Japan

- 中海
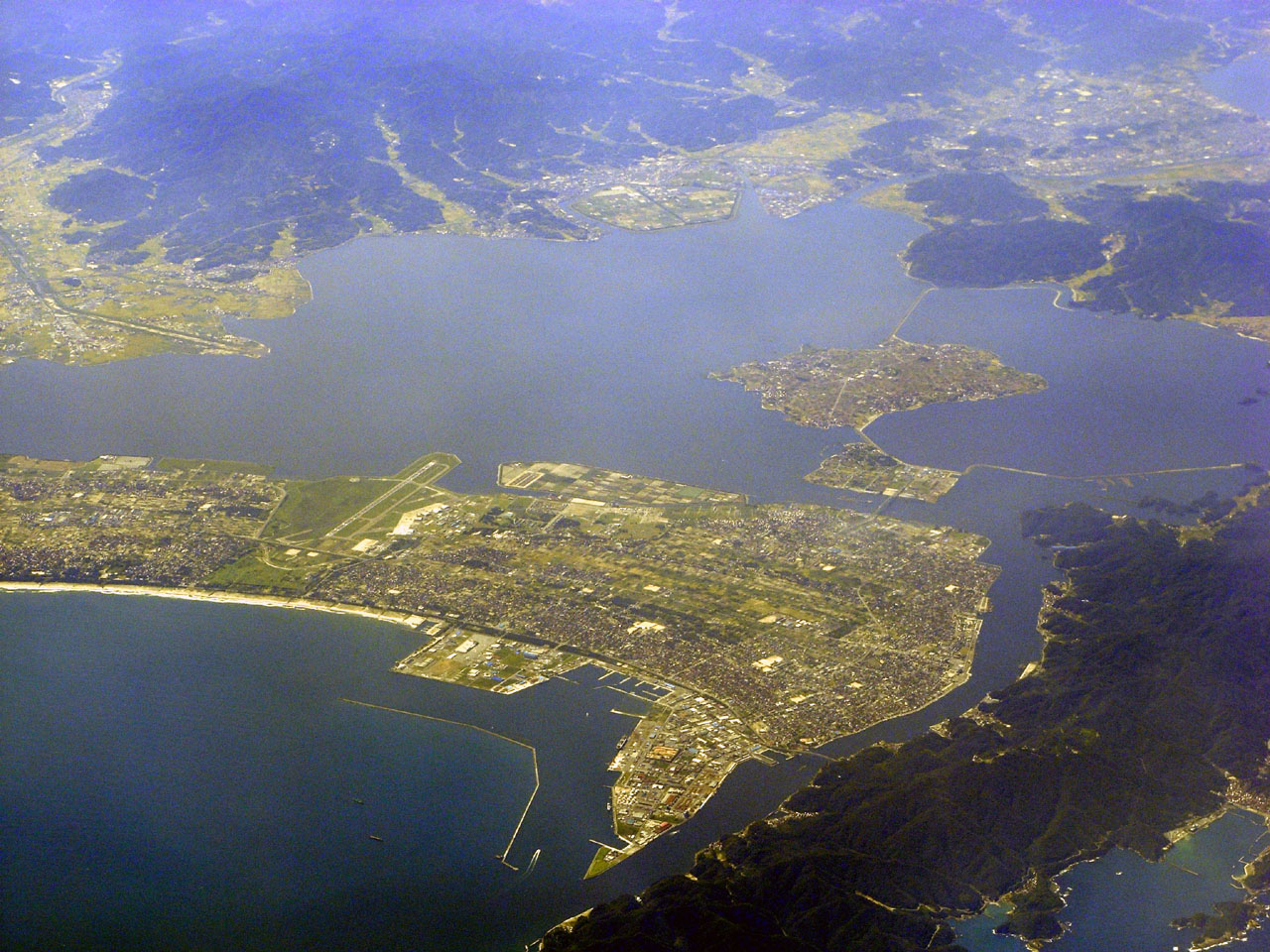

- Location within Japan
- Coordinates: 35°28′N 133°12′E
- Type: Brackish
- Primary inflows: Ōhashi River
- Primary outflows: Sakai Channel
- Basin countries: Japan
- Max. length: 63.49 km (39.45 mi)
- Max. width: 22.8 km (14.2 mi)
- Surface area: 86.2 km^{2} (33.3 sq mi)
- Max. depth: 17.1 m (56 ft)
- Water volume: 0.47 km^{3} (380,000 acre⋅ft)
- Shore length^{1}: 105 km (65 mi)
- Surface elevation: 0 m (0 ft)
- Islands: Daikonjima, Eshima

Ramsar Wetland
- Designated: 8 November 2005
- Reference no.: 1551
- ^{1} Shore length is not a well-defined measure.

Nakaumi (中海) is a brackish lake located between Tottori and Shimane prefectures in Japan. The lake is enclosed by the Shimane Peninsula to the north and Yumigahama Peninsula to the east. It is the fifth largest lake in surface area in Japan.

Nakaumi connects Lake Shinji and the Sea of Japan, and is surrounded by the municipalities Matsue, Yasugi, Yonago and Sakaiminato.

There are two large islands in the lake, Daikon Island (大根島, Daikonjima; literally "radish island") and Eshima Island (江島, Eshima; "inlet island"). There are bridges (inviting the Eshima Ohashi Bridge) and roads that connect the east and west shores of the lake through the two islands.

== Geography ==
The lake is located in the eastern part of Shimane Prefecture and the western part of Tottori Prefecture. It is surrounded by the Yumigahama Peninsula and the Shimane Peninsula, and is the fifth largest lake in Japan by area (see List of Japanese lakes by area). Its maximum depth was 17.1 meters, but was revised to 18.4 meters in 2024 (Reiwa 6) after a reinvestigation by the Geospatial Information Authority of Japan. This deepest point was widened during the land reclamation project (see below) in the 1960s and 1970s, and is believed to have been made deeper artificially.

In river improvement plans, the section upstream from the confluence with Lake Shinji is called the Hii River Main Stream, but there is almost no difference in water level from the downstream Hii River Main Stream to the Sakai Channel, and Lake Nakaumi is also affected by the tide. It is a brackish lake with an average salinity of about half that of seawater, and is home to species such as the Yamato Shijimi clam, with both saltwater and freshwater fish living in the same area.

The Hii River is a flood prevention warning river, and the Nakaumi Lake is designated as a water level notification river, and information on water levels at which evacuation decisions should be made is provided. Within the lake are Ejima and Daikonjima, which belong to Yatsuka Town in Matsue City, and Kamejima, which belongs to Yasugi City, and Ejima is connected to Sakaiminato City in Tottori Prefecture by the Eshima Ohashi Bridge. The inland ports of Yasugi and Yonago are located in the prefecture. Other ports along the coast include Sakitsu Fishing Port and Mado Fishing Port.

== Ecosystem ==
Lake Nakaumi is a brackish lake, making it a unique area where both freshwater and saltwater organisms can grow and live. In addition, many birds live and migrate to the lake to feed on these organisms. In particular, more than 75,000 geese and ducks, such as pochards, tufted ducks, and greater scaup, migrate there every year, and more than 1,000 whooper swans migrate there every year, making it the southernmost migration area in Japan. For this reason, on November 1, 1974, the lake was designated as a nationally designated Nakaumi Bird and Wildlife Protection Area (migration area) (8,724 ha, of which 8,043 ha is a special protection area ). In addition, on November 8, 2005, the lake was registered under the Ramsar Convention.

The area is also home to a diverse range of crustacean species, with at least 160 recorded species.

== Use ==
Like the neighboring Lake Shinji, fishing is practiced here, and in the 1950s, the catch was several times that of Lake Shinji, mainly of ark shells (Arcana). However, the catch has gradually decreased since then, and currently, the catch is around 300 to 400 tons, mainly of fish such as sea bass, in contrast to Lake Shinji, which is the largest producer of Japanese clams (Yamato corbicula ).

Additionally, Yonago Waterbird Park and Shiratori Beach are popular birdwatching spots, and from summer to autumn the area is used as a place for recreational activities such as fishing and sports such as windsurfing and waterskiing.

In addition, the Nakaumi/Shinjiko Regatta and the Yonago Citizens Regatta will be held.

== History ==
The formation of Lake Nakaumi

It is believed that the sea level rise during the Jomon period about 7,000 years ago led to the formation of Paleo-Nakaumi Bay, which formed the prototype of the current Lake Nakaumi. At this time, it was not yet connected to Paleo-Shinji Bay (present-day Lake Shinji), but when the entrance to Paleo- Shinji Bay was blocked by accumulated sand from the Hii River, the water from Lake Shinji began to flow into Paleo-Nakaumi Bay. Jomon settlements (such as the Hottakami ruins) appeared from the mountainous areas to the coast of Paleo-Nakaumi Bay. Jomon people appeared on the coast of Lake Shinji Bay (Hishine ruins).

About 2,400 years ago (in the Yayoi period), sand accumulation and a drop in sea level caused the Yumigahama sandbar to appear at the entrance to the Kochukai Bay, forming the Kochukai lagoon. Later, in the 8th century (Nara period), sea levels rose again and the sandbar was vsubmerged. Nakaumi returned to a bay, and is described in the Izumo no Kuni Fudoki as "Ouno Iriumi," while the port of Yasugi is described in the Manyoshu as "Oho no Ura." It was also sometimes called "Nishikigaura." At this time, Yumigahama had become an island called "Yomishima."

It is believed that after the Heian period, due to the accumulation of sediment and the fall in sea levels caused by the Little Ice Age, Yamishima once again became a sandbar connected to the mainland, forming Lake Nakaumi. In particular, the collection of iron sand through the tatara ironworks, known as iron hole nagashi, is thought to have influenced the accumulation of sediment in Yumigahama through the rivers, and reached its peak during the Edo period.

Meanwhile, in the Edo period, algae were harvested in Lake Nakaumi for use as fertilizer, but in the mid- Meiji era, when the technology for cultivating ark shells was established, ark shells became actively cultivated as a specialty product of Lake Nakaumi. However, the occurrence of red tides from around the early Showa period made ark shell cultivation gradually difficult, and by the 1980s ark shells could hardly be caught.

Meanwhile, reclamation and desalination projects had been planned for Lake Nakaumi and were being carried out, but the reclamation project was halted in 2000 and the desalination project was halted in 2002 (see below).

The 2000 Tottori earthquake caused damage to the lake shore embankment, resulting in the embankment subsidence.

Since 2002, the Nakaumi Regeneration Project has been underway, aiming to purify Lake Nakaumi and promote urban development. This project is led by the aforementioned Nakaumi Television.

=== Land reclamation and desalination projects ===
The large-scale reclamation and desalination of Lake Nakaumi is known as the "Showa era Land Draw ", and originated from the "National Lake Nakaumi Land Improvement Project", which was announced by Shimane Prefecture in June 1954 and started in April 1963. The plan was to create approximately 2,230 hectares of farmland through reclamation, and to desalinize Lake Nakaumi to secure agricultural water for the reclaimed land and approximately 7,300 hectares of farmland around the coast.

Construction began in earnest in 1968, but in 1971 the rice paddy reduction policy was fully implemented, and in 1984 the plans were forced to change from creating rice paddies to creating farmland.

Meanwhile, although the embankment (Moriyama embankment) of the Honjo section (which would later become a point of contention over the merits of reclamation) was completed in 1980, opposition movements arose due to concerns over water pollution and environmental destruction, and fishermen in Lake Shinji, which would be affected by the desalination, also began to oppose the project. As a result, in May 1988, Shimane Prefecture and Tottori Prefecture requested a postponement of the implementation of the desalination project from the Ministry of Agriculture, Forestry and Fisheries, and in September, the Nakaumi Reclamation Agreement was signed to allow for the postponement. The reclamation of the Honjo section was postponed.

After that, the Iya, Yasugi, and Yumihama sections were completed in 1989, and the Hikona section in 1993, but the Honjo section, which accounted for the majority of the reclamation plan (1,689 ha), continued to be postponed.

Finally, in 2000, amid a nationwide movement to "review public works," the Ministry of Agriculture, Forestry and Fisheries' Chugoku- Shikoku Agricultural Administration Office announced in April its intention to review the entire land reclamation project, citing "changes in social conditions." In July, Shimane Prefecture froze the project due to financial pressures, and in August the Ministry of Agriculture, Forestry and Fisheries decided to cancel reclamation of the Honjo section.

In 2002, the Ministry of Agriculture, Forestry and Fisheries decided to cancel the desalination project, which had been frozen for a long time. In 2005, the procedures for changing the project plan and canceling it were completed, and work began on securing water for agricultural use on the reclaimed land and disposing of facilities. Removal of the Nakaura Water Gate (constructed in 1974) and other structures began, and was completed in March 2009.

Currently, jumbo garlic and green onions are produced.

=== Storm surge damage ===
The September 2003 storm surge reached its highest water level ever recorded, causing flooding in the cities of Yonago and Matsue. Flooding damage was also caused by storm surges in September 2002, August 2004, and September 2004. As a result, flood control plans have been implemented, including the construction of the Obara Dam and Shizumi Dam, construction of the Hii River Floodway, which diverts the main Hii River into the Kobe River, repairs to the Ohashi River, and construction of the shorelines of Lake Shinji and Lake Nakaumi.

== See also ==
- List of lakes in Japan
