= Sekizan Myōjin =

Figure of Chinese origin in Japanese Buddhism

- God of destiny
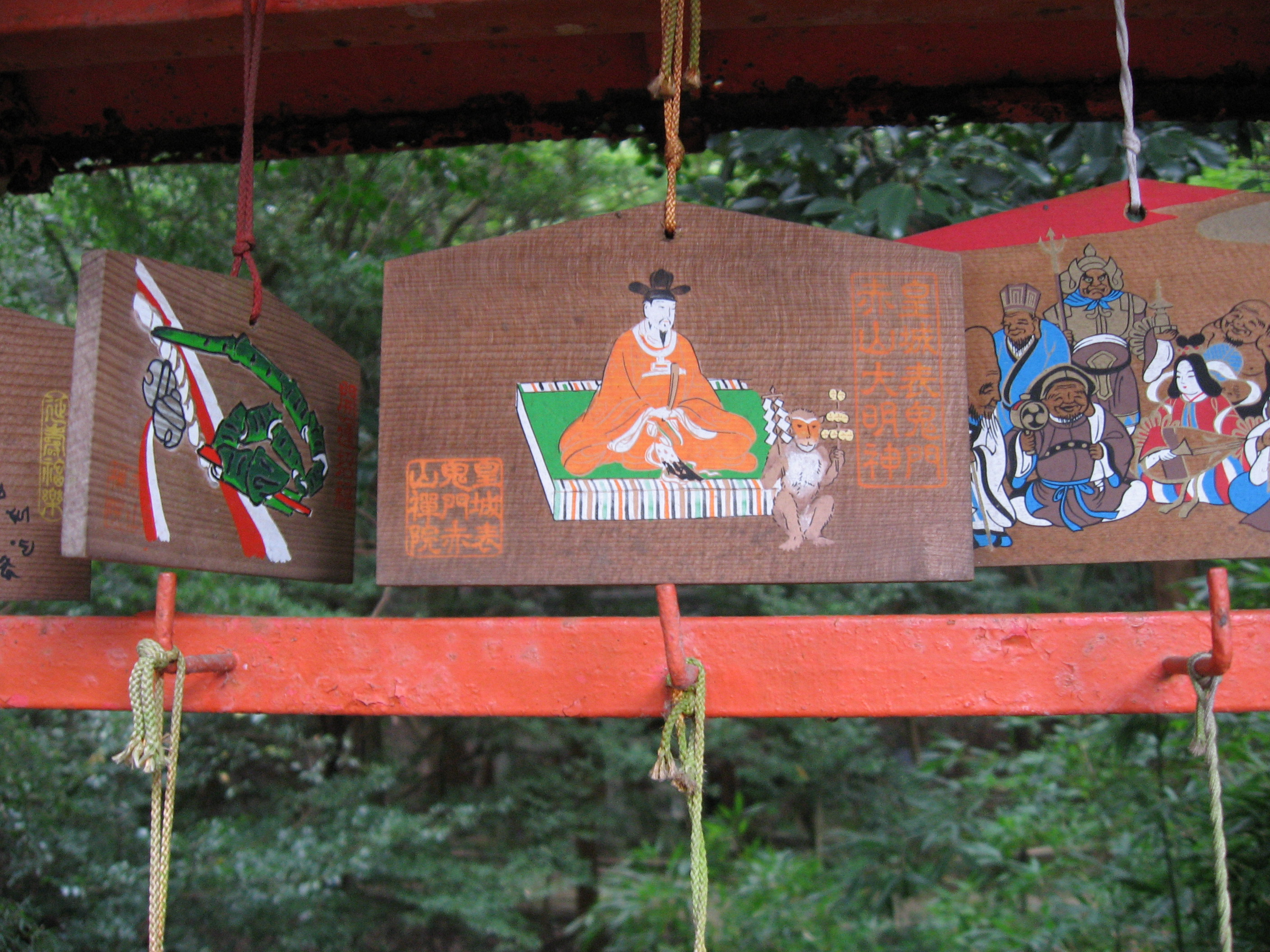
- A contemporary ema (votive tablet) with a depiction of Sekizan Myōjin.
- Kanji: 赤山明神
- Major cult center: Sekizan zen'in
- Weapon: bow and arrow

Sekizan Myōjin (赤山明神; also romanized as Sekisan Myōjin) is a Japanese Buddhist god venerated in the Tendai tradition. It is presumed that he is derived from a Chinese deity associated with Chishan, a mountain in Shandong who was incorporated into Buddhism and later brought to Japan by monks. Traditional narratives credit Ennin with his introduction, but this most likely does not reflect historical reality. Sekizan Myōjin is primarily considered a god of destiny, and in this capacity can be identified as a representation of the so-called "auxiliary star” of the Northern Dipper, Hosei (Alcor). He can also function as a protective god of Mount Hiei or as a deity associated with pestilence. In art he is depicted as an old man resembling the Ten Kings of Hell, sometimes armed with a bow and arrow. Oldest surviving depictions of him date to the Edo period. Through history, he acquired a number of associations with other deities, including Taishan Fujun, Shinra Myōjin or Matarajin. The Sekizan zen'in located on Mount Hiei is a temple dedicated to him, originally erected in the ninth century.

== Name and origin ==
According to Sekizan Myōjin engi (赤山明神縁起), Sekizan Myōjin was originally a Chinese deity associated with Chishan (赤山, read as Sekizan in Japanese; literally “Red Mountain”), a mountain in Shandong. It has been suggested that his name was initially a generic designation for any deities associated with this location. Supposedly Ennin came to pray at Chishan before embarking on the journey back to Japan. He promised the deity of the mountain that he will dedicate a shrine to him. When Ennin's ship was caught in a storm on the way back, Sekizan Myōjin appeared to him in the form of an old man and helped with securing safe passage. According to a variant of the tale, while Ennin was praying in Fahua yuan (法華院), a house of worship founded by Chang Pogo, Sekizan Myōjin appeared to him in the form of an old man and made a vow that he will protect him. Jikaku daishi den (慈覚大師伝) does not directly use the name Sekizan Myōjin, but it does state that in a dream Ennin met a local deity who took the form of an old merchant and sold him scales which let him acquire great knowledge. (Note: According to Sujung Kim, this description might indicate a connection between the deity encountered by Ennin and the local community of Silla merchants, or specifically Chang Pogo.)

Despite the content of the narratives about Ennin, the oldest references to the worship of Sekizan Myōjin in Japan postdate his death. The link between him and this deity was most likely invented by his disciples, and later acquired new importance due to the rivalry between Jimon and Sanmon branches of Tendai. However, the assumption that he originally developed as a Chinese deity who first came to be incorporated into Buddhism and later was introduced to Japan by traveling monks is still considered plausible by modern authors. Similar narratives focused on Shinra Myōjin and Matarajin are also known. Further similar episodes involve deities such as Sannō Gongen or Sumiyoshi. Furthermore, the portrayal of Sekizan Myōjin as a protective deity of Ennin has been compared to similar connections between Kūkai and Seiryū Gongen and Dōgen and Inari Myōjin.

== Character ==
Sekizan Myōjin is primarily considered a god of human destiny, and as an extension of this role functions as an official in the realm of the dead and as an astral deity associated with the so-called “auxiliary star” of the Northern Dipper. This astral body corresponds to Alcor (80 Ursae Majoris), traditionally known as Hosei (補星) or Tenposei (天輔星) in Japan, Fuxing in China and Arundhatī in India. (Note: Hosei could also be identified as Myōken, Matarajin (in Sannō Shintō), Taizan Fukun or the female deity Myōjō Tenshi (明星天子), the personification of Venus.) It was referred to as the "Star of Emoluments and Longevity" (福禄星, Fukuroku-sei). While in India being able to see it was traditionally seen simply as a test of acuity of vision, in China a belief that it can bring longevity developed, while in Japan instead being unable to see it could be interpreted as a sign of impending death.

Sekizan Myōjin is also considered a gohōjin, a deity regarded as the protector of dharma. He can be considered a protective deity of Mount Hiei and of the Sanmon lineage of Tendai. A further role which can be assigned to him is that of a deity of pestilence.

Sujung Kim compares the character of Sekizan Myōjin to figures such as Gozu Tennō, Matarajin, Shinra Myōjin and Ugajin, and notes he can be considered an example of a deity belonging to the modern scholarly category of ishin (異神, “eccentric gods”), deities associated with Japanese esoteric Buddhism.

== Iconography ==
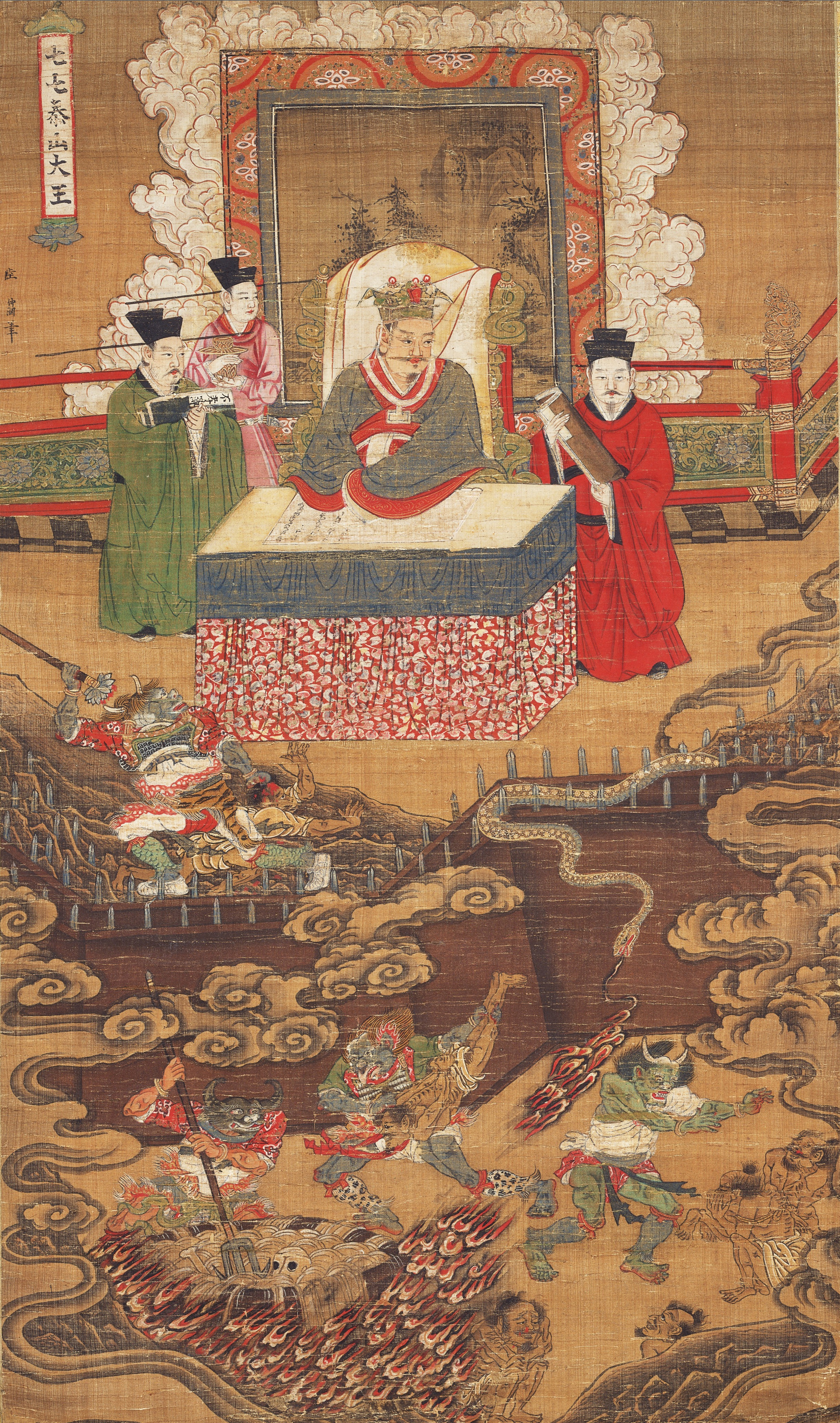
A depiction of one of the Ten Kings of Hell, Taizan Fukun. Nara National Museum.

Sekizan Myōjin is typically depicted as an old man dressed like a Chinese official and seated in a high chair. He is also wearing a crown and holds a wooden wand in his hands. His appearance most likely has been based on that of one of the Ten Kings of Hell. It has been noted that his iconography resembles that of Taizan Fukun in particular. Related imagery was only introduced in Japan in the Kamakura period through the import of paintings from the Chinese port city Ningbo. He can alternatively be depicted holding a bow and white-feathered arrows. He is described as armed with them in an account of a dream vision of emperor Go-Sanjō. According to Bernard Faure, these attributes are intended to give him a “threatening, martial” appearance, which might have originally developed during the conflict between Sanmon and Jimon which involved temporary occupation of his temple. Descriptions of Sekizan Myōjin as a figure clad in armor are also known. On ema (絵馬; votive tablets), he can be accompanied by a monkey holding a gohei, an animal symbol of Mount Hiei, regarded as a messenger of Sannō.

The oldest surviving depictions of Sekizan Myōjin only date back to the Edo period. One example is known from the Ichigami Shrine. The University Art Museum of the Kyoto City University of Arts also has an Edo period drawing of him in its collection (BZS 4061).

== Associations with other figures ==
Sekizan Myōjin is particularly strongly identified with Taizan Fukun (Taishan Fujun), a god associated with destiny. This connection might have already developed in China, possibly due to the proximity between Chishan, the mountain associated with Sekizan Myōjin, and Mount Tai, associated with Taizan. The two are described as two names of the same deity in Genpei Jōsuiki:

Sekizan is the name of a mountain in China. The god is called Sekizan Myōjin because he dwells on that mountain. He is also called Taizan Fukun.

Bernard Faure additionally suggests that it is possible the name of the temple of Sekizan Myōjin, Sekizan zen'in (赤山禅院), might be derived not from Zen meditation as often argued, but from a type of Chinese sacrifice known as shan (禅), a part of feng shan (封禅) rites, sacrifices to heaven and earth, which according to him might constitute a reference to Taizan Fukun. Faure also assumes the fact Sekizan Myōjin's honji is the bodhisattva Jizō might also be tied to his association with the god of mount Tai. This connection is documented both in Genpei Jōsuiki and in another text, Shintōshū.

Shinra Myōjin and Sekizan Myōjin have been described as similar deities. Faure refers to the latter as the “Hieizan counterpart” of the former. Sujung Kim outright argues that they were originally two names of the same deity. However, Faure maintains that despite the connection between them, they likely had distinct origins and ultimately developed into distinct deities. They were regarded as protectors of two rival branches of Tendai, Sanmon and Jimon. It is a matter of debate among researchers whether the worship of Sekizan Myōjin was initially promoted in response to the veneration of Shinra Myōjin (centered in Onjō-ji) or the other way around. According to texts contemporary with the early conflict between Jimon and Sanmon, both deities were believed to actively partake in it, and in mythological terms it was reinterpreted as a rivalry between them; monks from Mount Hiei also maintained that Shinra Myōjin was only a servant of Sekizan Myōjin, but this was not accepted by these from Onjō-ji. Detailed accounts of their involvement in the conflict are given in Sannō rishōki (日吉山王利生記) and Genpei jōsuiki. Reportedly emperor Go-Sanjō was visited by both of them in his dreams, with Shinra Myōjin urging him to let the Onjō-ji monks build their own ordination platform (the lack of which was the original cause of disagreement), and Sekizan Myōjin threatening to use his bow and arrows against anyone who will authorize its construction. Both Sekizan Myōjin and Shinra Myōjin are also considered related to Matarajin. Faure argues that they historically formed an “implicit triad”, with Matarajin enshrined on top of Mount Hiei as the protector of the three pagodas of Enryaku-ji, and Sekizan Myōjin and Shinra Myōjin respectively on its eastern and western feet. A degree of interchange of attributes and functions between them has also been noted. However, in contrast with the other two, Matarajin never came to be regarded as a myōjin.

Shintōshū, a fourteenth century Buddhist text, identifies Sekizan Myōjin with Gozu Tennō. It also states that Mutō Tenjin is his honji. Additionally, like Gozu Tennō, he could also be linked with Susanoo. Suwa engi, one of the three sections of Shintōshū focused on Suwa and its deity, refers to Sekizan Myōjin as the father of Kōga Saburō and his brothers.

== Worship ==
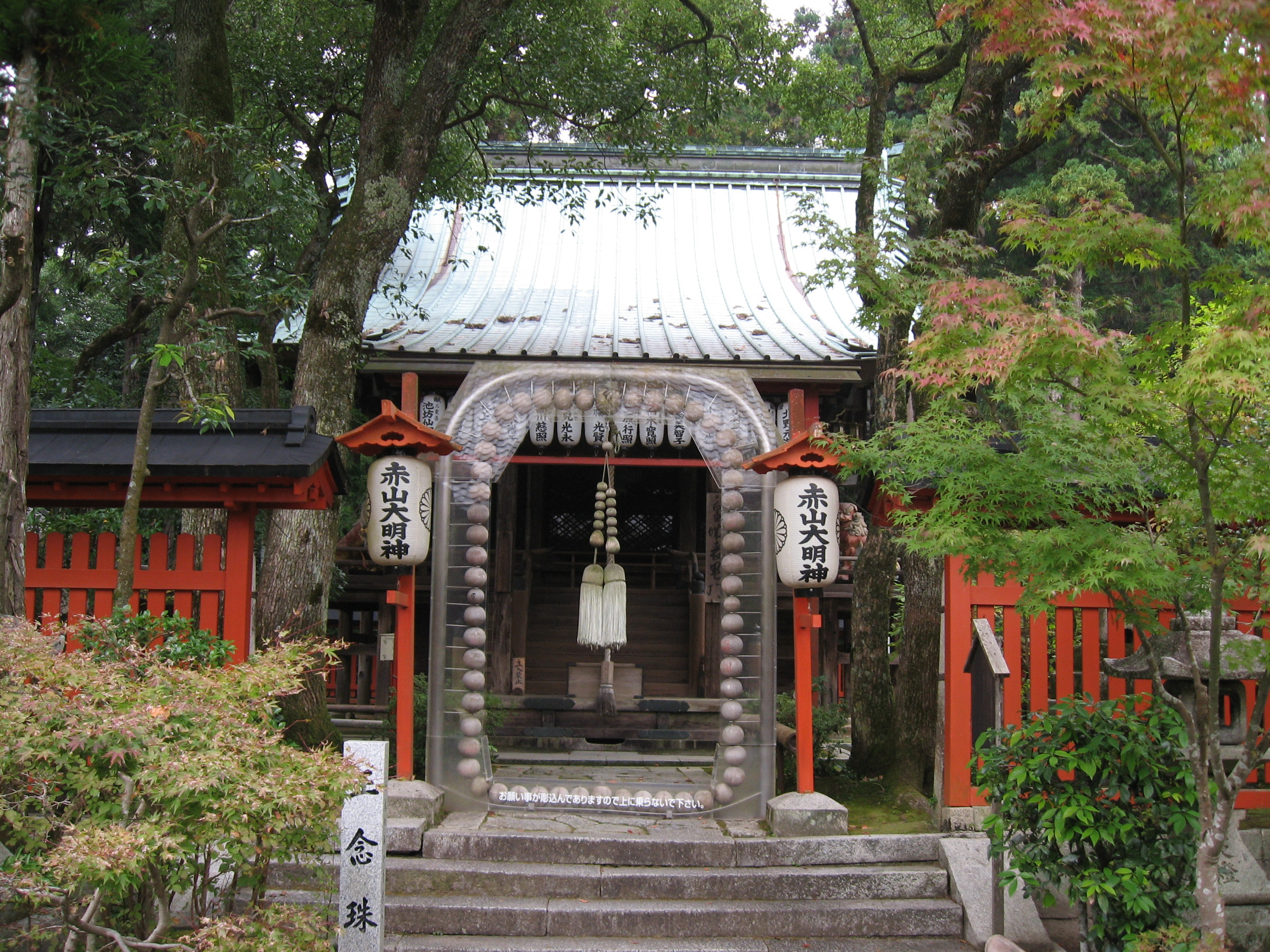
The main hall of Sekizan Zen'in.

Sekizan Myōjin is worshiped in the Tendai school of Japanese Buddhism. His temple is known as Sekizan zen'in (赤山禅院). It is located on the western foot of Mount Hiei, to the northeast of Kyoto. The location was selected based on the fact that the eastern side already was the site of a shrine dedicated to the deity Sannō (山王). It was originally erected in 864 by Anne (安慧; 795–868), one of the disciples of Ennin, but was destroyed after his death, only to be subsequently rebuilt in 884, after Sekizan Myōjin reportedly appeared in a dream of the priest Sōō (相応; 831–918). Shortly after that, he gained additional prestige due to emperor Uda and emperor Daigō promoting him. In 993, during the early confrontations between Sanmon and Jimon, monks affiliated with the former of these two branches of Tendai occupied Sekizan zen'in, which resulted in a complaint to the imperial court from their opponents residing at Mount Hiei. Today Ema depicting Sekizan Myōjin can be deposited in the temple as votives. He also appears on ofuda issued by it.
