= Gongen =

Incarnations of the buddha as kami in ancient Japanese shinto-buddhism

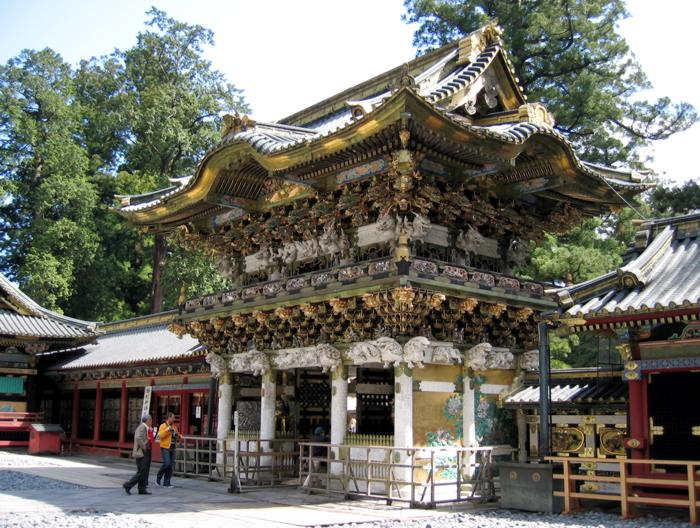
Nikkō Tōshō-gū enshrines Tokugawa Ieyasu under the posthumous name of Tōshō Daigongen.

A gongen (権現), literally "incarnation", was believed to be the manifestation of a buddha in the form of an indigenous kami, an entity who had come to guide the people to salvation, during the era of shinbutsu-shūgō in premodern Japan. The words gonge (権化) and kegen (化現) are synonyms for gongen. Gongen shinkō (権現信仰) is the term for belief in the existence of gongen.

The gongen concept is the cornerstone of the honji suijaku theory, according to which Buddhist deities choose to appear to the Japanese as native kami in order to save them, which is based on the Mahayana Buddhist notion of upaya, "expedient means".

== History ==
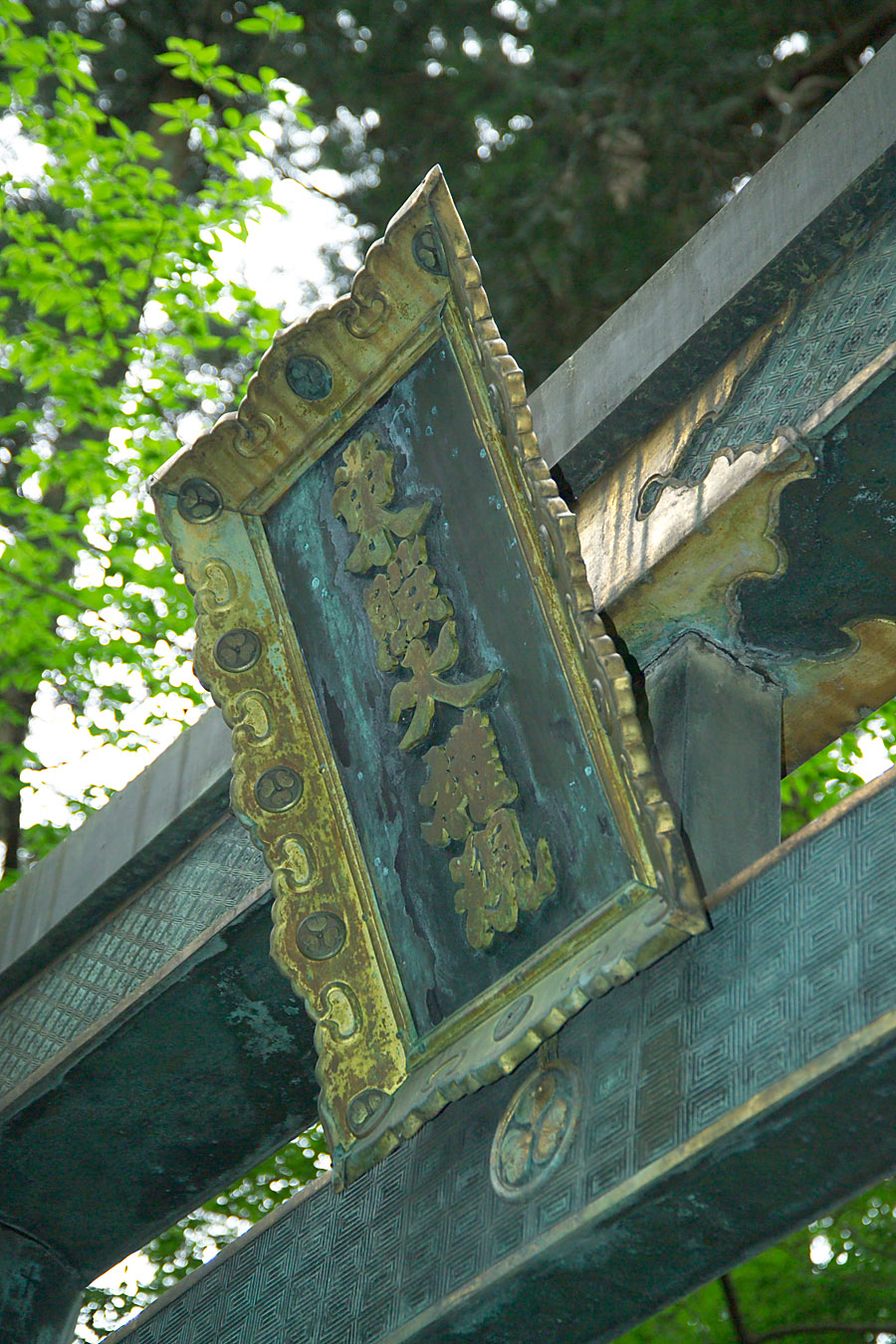
Tablet on torii at Nikkō Tōshō-gū reads "Tōshō Daigongen" (calligraphy by Emperor Go-Mizunoo).

It is sometimes assumed that the word gongen derives from Tokugawa Ieyasu's posthumous name (Tōshō Daigongen). However, the term was created and started being used in the middle of the Heian period in an effort to harmonize Buddhism and indigenous religious practice in what is called shinbutsu-shūgō or "syncretism of kami and buddhas". At that time, the assumption that Japanese kami and buddhas were essentially the same evolved into a theory called honji suijaku (本地垂迹), which held that native kami were manifestations or avatars of buddhas, bodhisattvas and other Buddhist deities. The theory gradually spread around the country and the concept of gongen, a dual entity composed of a buddha and a kami, evolved.

Under the influence of Tendai Buddhism and Shugendō, the gongen concept was adapted to religious beliefs tied to Mount Iwaki, a volcano, so that female kami Kuniyasutamahime became associated with Avalokiteśvara ekadaśamukha (Jūichimen Kannon Bosatsu, "Eleven-Faced Guanyin"), Ōkuninushi with Bhaisajyaguru (Yakushi Nyōrai) and Kuninotokotachi with Amitābha (Amida Nyōrai).

The title "gongen" started being attached to the names of kami and shrines were built within the premises of large Buddhist temples to enshrine their tutelary kami. During the Japanese Middle Ages, shrines started being called with the name gongen to underline their ties to Buddhism. For example, in Eastern Japan there are still many Mount Haku shrines where the shrine itself is called either gongen or jinja. Because it represents the application of Buddhist terminology to native kami, the use of the term was legally abolished in the Meiji Restoration with the Shinto and Buddhism Separation Order (神仏判然令, Shin-butsu Hanzenrei) and shrines began to be called jinja.

=== Gongen of Japan ===
- Amaterasu (天照大神) – Sun goddess, sometimes regarded in syncretic contexts as a gongen of Dainichi Nyorai (Great Sun Buddha).
- Atago Gongen (愛宕権現) – Tengu-associated protector of fire defense, particularly worshipped by warriors on Mount Atago.
- Akiba Gongen – Protector against fire disasters, worshipped at Akiba shrines.
- Chimyō Gongen – Protector deity in certain Shugendō lineages.
- Hachiman (八幡大菩薩 / 八幡権現) – Shinto god of war and protector of Japan, syncretised with the deity Bishamon.
- Gozu Tennō (牛頭天王) – Ox King of healing.
- Hachiōji Gongen – Associated with various mountain cults.
- Haguro Gongen – Guardian of Mount Haguro, central to Haguro Shugendō.
- Hakone Gongen – Mountain and lake deity of Hakone.
- Hakusan Gongen – Mountain worship deity of Hakusan; linked to Hakusan Shugendō.
- Hikosan Gongen – Guardian deity of Mount Hiko in Kyushu.
- Futarasan Gongen – Guardian of Nikkō, central to Nikkō Shugendō.
- Fūjin
- Ishizuchi Daigongen – Guardian of Mount Ishizuchi, also associated with Ishizuchi Kongō Zaō Dai Gongen.
- Izuna Gongen (飯網の権現), also called "Izuna Myōjin" and enshrined in Izuna Shrine in Nagano, is similar to a tengu and represents the kami of Mount Iizuna.
- Izusan Gongen (伊豆山権現) or Hashiri-yu Gongen (走湯権現) is the spirit of a hot spring on Izusan, a hill in Shizuoka Prefecture, enshrined in the Izusan Jinja
- Kumano Gongen (熊野権現), also known as Three Mountains of Kumano (熊野三山). The kami enshrined in the three Kumano Sanzan Grand Shrines and worshipped in Kumano shrines are the three Kumano mountains: Hongū, Shingū, and Nachi.
- Konpira Gongen (金毘羅権現) – Sea and maritime safety deity, associated with Kotohira-gū.
- Kōjin (荒神) – Hearth and fire kami, revered for protection in domestic traditions.
- Kuzuryū (九頭龍権現) – The nine-headed dragon kami tied to water and mountain worship.
- Ishizuchi Daigongen – Connected to Hakusan Shugendō tradition.
- Matarajin
- Myōken (妙見菩薩) – King of the North Star.
- Nezu Gongen – Historical form of Nezu Shrine's deity in Tokyo.
- Ōkuninushi (大国主神) is likewise associated with Daikokuten in Buddhist syncretism.
- Sanki Daigongen – A wrathful protective deity of certain Shugendō sects.
- Sannō Gongen (山王権現) or Hie (alternatively Hiyoshi) Sannō Daigongen (日吉山王大権現) is a guardian deity worshipped in Tendai Buddhism as spread from Mount Hiei. It is treated as a Buddhist title of Shinto Oyamakui no Kami.
- Sekizan Myōjin
- Seiryū Gongen (清滝権現) was enshrined in Jingo-ji in Takao as the tutelary kami of Shingon Buddhism by Kūkai.
- Suzuka Gongen – Linked to Katayama Shrine in Kameyama; associated with miko and kugutsu traditions.
- Shinra Myōjin
- Shiramine Daigongen – Enshrines spirits of prominent historical figures.
- Taki Gongen – Guardian deity of waterfalls in sacred mountains.
- Taishan Fujun
- Tengu
- Tōshō Daigongen is one of the most famous examples of gongen, representing Tokugawa Ieyasu posthumously enshrined in so-called Tōshō-gū shrines present all over Japan. The original one is Nikkō Tōshō-gū in Nikkō, Tochigi.
- Ugajin (宇賀神) – Snake-bodied harvest deity, syncretised with Benzaiten.
- Yuga Daigongen – Shugendō deity linked to esoteric yoga practices.
- Zaō Gongen (蔵王権現) or Kongō Zaō Bosatsu (金剛蔵王菩薩) one of two Zaō Gongen manifestations in Japan. The trio from the Omine mountain range is a manifestation of Shakyamuni Tathagata, Sahasrabhuja Avalokitesvara, and Maitreya. Ishizuchi Kongo Zaō Dai Gongen (石鎚金剛蔵王大権現) is the 2nd manifestation. The trio of Mount Ishizuchi is a manifestation of Amitābha, Avalokiteśvara, and Mahasthamaprapta.

== Gongen-zukuri ==
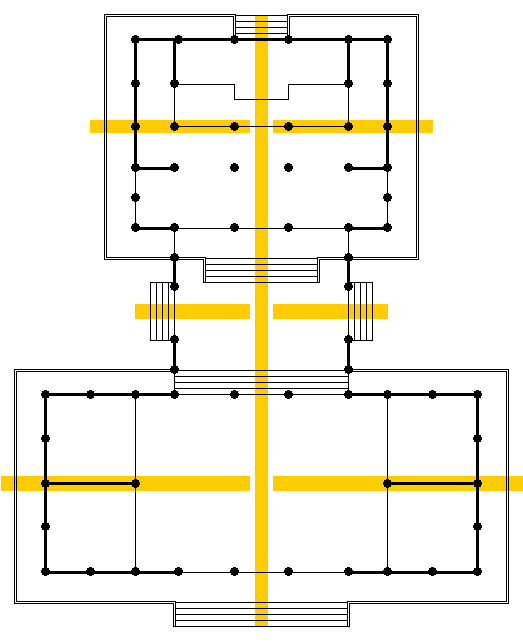
Plan of a gongen-zukuri shrine

Gongen-zukuri (権現造) is the name of a complex Shinto shrine structure in which the haiden, or worship hall, and the honden, or main sanctuary, are interconnected under the same roof in the shape of an H. One of the oldest examples of gongen-zukuri is Kitano Tenmangū in Kyoto. The name comes from Nikkō Tōshō-gū in Nikkō because it enshrines the Tōshō Daigongen and adopts this structure.

== See also ==
- Myōjin
- The Glossary of Shinto for an explanation of terms concerning Japanese Shinto, Shinto art, and Shinto shrine architecture
