= Shinra Myōjin =

Deity in Tendai Buddhism

- Protector of dharma, god of sea routes, waka and pestilence
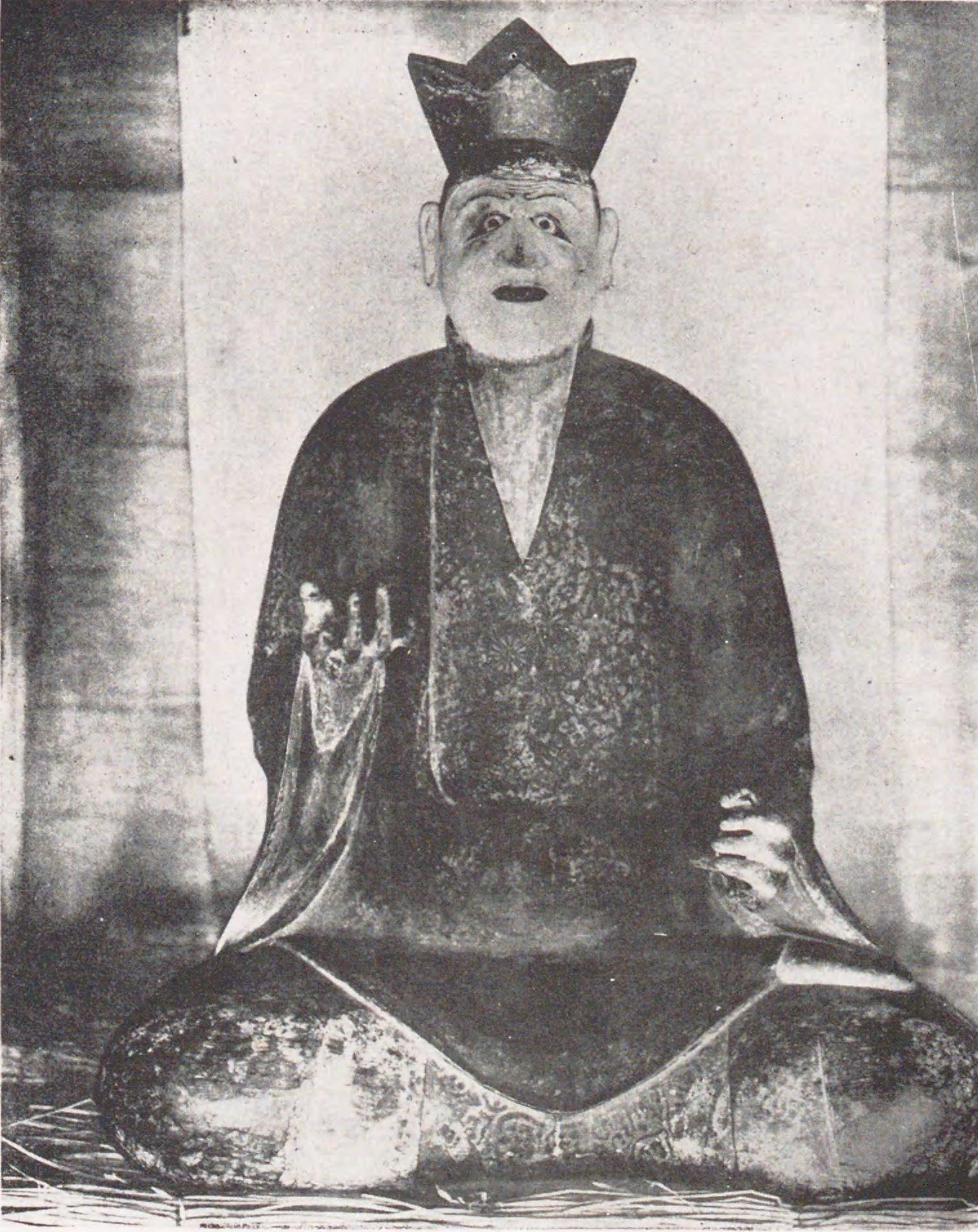
- A statue of Shinra Myōjin from Onjō-ji.
- Kanji: 新羅明神
- Affiliation: Japanese Buddhism
- Major cult center: Onjō-ji
- Gender: Male
- Region: Silla (supposedly); Japan
- Ethnic group: Korean

Shinra Myōjin (Japanese: 新羅明神; しんらみょうじん) is a Buddhist god associated with the Jimon branch of Tendai, a school of Japanese Buddhism that is chiefly worshiped in Onjō-ji. He is a god that was introduced to Japan from Korea (Silla) by incoming immigrants.

Historically, he was portrayed as a deity who arrived in Japan from Silla in order to protect Buddhist monks. He was later revised as a Japanese deity who went and subjugated Silla due to a negative shift in the perception of the kingdom within Japan. Domestically, he was regarded as a symbol of Jimon and its institutions, but also as a protector of sea routes and as a mountain deity. He also developed associations with waka poetry and with pestilence.

In art form, he is typically depicted as an elderly man dressed in the clothes in line with Tang-era officials with Buddhist elements, and historically, developed connections with a number of other figures, including Susanoo, Matarajin, and Mañjuśrī.

== Background ==
=== Narratives ===
Early sources portray Shinra Myōjin as a Korean deity who arrived in Japan to protect Tendai monks and their monasteries. According to Sujung Kim, the oldest reference to him in such context occurs in a narrative from Onjōji ryūge-e engi (園城寺龍華会縁起) from 1062. (Note: According to Edward R. Drott, the name was already attested earlier, in the tenth century, in an administrative text.) According to the story, during the Tendai patriarch and Buddhist monk, Enchin's travel back to Japan from his five-year stay in China in 858, he encountered a mighty storm in the Korea Strait, a sea passage infamous for strong currents and difficult maritime navigation. Sensing that he was in a life-threatening situation, Enchin began to pray for safety, which prompted Shinra Myōjin to appear in front of him as an old man on a boat. It is said that the Korean god introduced himself to Enchin as a deity from Silla who protects anyone of the Buddhist faith "until Buddha Maitreya returned to this world." After Enchin safely returned to Japan thanks to Shinra Myōjin's intervention, he began to worship the deity out of gratitude and reverence.

A later variant from the Taiheiki has him encounter both Shinra Myōjin and Fudō Myōō (Acala). Similar narratives regarding two other deities of similar character, Matarajin and Sekizan Myōjin, are also observed. The general consensus is that the initial story surrounding Shinra Myōjin and Enchin served as their foundation. In another instance, Enchin is said to have visited a shrine on Mount Song and during a massive storm, he encountered a supernatural being with a head of an old man and a snake's body, identified as a manifestation of Shinra Myōjin.

=== Name ===
The name "Shinra Myōjin" can be translated as the "Shining deity of Silla". Silla was a historical kingdom on the Korean Peninsula which existed between 57 BCE and 935. The kingdom of Silla (新羅) can be read as "Shiragi; Shiraki; Shinra" and the term myōjin, meaning "bright deity", designates the class of Japanese deities. It is possible that the name was originally a generic designation, "Silla deity", and only later developed into a proper name.

=== Origin ===
Based on his name and origin story, Shinra Myōjin is said to be of Korean origin, despite not appearing in any historical Korean sources.

Less popular theories include the possibility of Shinra Myōjin being the deification of Chang Pogo or a god originating from China rather than Korea, due to him being referred to as "king of Mount Song", though the story variant was added much later. Others include him being a Korean god that used China as an intermediary in his transmission to Japan or that the historical Ōmi Province in Japan was his actual "birthplace". However, scholars such as Sujung Kim state that it is difficult to strictly describe him as a Japanese god or a Korean god due to the lack of information in Korea, but shows clear Korean elements found in Japan. She posits that Shinra Myōjin may be something in between.

== Influence ==
Surviving sources from Enchin's times, including his fragmentary journal and an iconographic scroll he brought from China (Gobu shinkan), do not mention Shinra Myōjin. It is most likely that the narrative about their encounter only developed in the late 10th or 11th century. According to Sujung Kim, its precise origin and early development are difficult to study, but it might have reflected a pre-existing folkloric motif. Christine Guth suggests that it might have initially been a way to consecrate the role sailors from Silla played in Enchin's journey.

After the Mongol invasions of Japan, a belief that Shinra Myōjin was a Japanese kami who conquered Silla developed, as documented in Onjō-ji denki. It states that he "became a king of Silla in order to wield Japanese power all over the world", an argument that was commonly found in theories such as Nissen dōsoron. Bernard Faure argues that the change in the characterization of Shinra Myōjin in both Onjōji denki and another source documenting this tradition, Hachiman gudōkin, can be characterized as a display of "anti-Korean prejudice", comparable to hostile attitudes also present in the narrative of Empress Jingū. Sujung Kim connects the change to the development of the notion of transmission of Buddhism from India through China to Japan, originally developed in the Kamakura period, which marginalized the role of Korea in the process. She also notes that while anti-Korean, or specifically anti-Silla, such sentiment was already present in Japan in the ninth century as a result of the conquest of its traditional ally Paekche in 660, piracy, epidemics brought from the peninsula and other factors; it later encompassed the Mongol invasions, which utilized the Korean navy, as the Goryeo dynasty, while it did not initiate the conflict, was among the vassals of the Mongols that helped invade Japan. She suggests that due to the fear stemmed from these events, a need to redefine Shinra Myōjin as a naturalized deity dedicated to protecting Japan from foreign invaders emerged.

Shinra Myōjin is associated with the Jimon branch of Tendai. Historically he effectively functioned as a symbol of its institutions, in addition to being its paramount deity. He is regarded as a gohōjin, "protector of Buddhist dharma". Such figures function as protectors of Buddhist temples and teachings. He cannot be easily classified as a member of one of the two categories resulting from the distinction between kami and Buddhist figures made within honji suijaku. On occasion he was described as a Daoist immortal (神仙, shinsen). In modern scholarship, he is considered one of the examples of so-called "eccentric gods" (異神, ishin), deities associated with medieval form of Japanese esoteric Buddhism.

In engi (Note: A shortened form of the phrase innen shōki (因緣生起), an equivalent of Sanskrit pratītyasamutpāda, used to refer to narratives about the origins of temples, shrines and statues, miracles associated with them, lifes of famous monks or simply records of prayers or rituals.) stories, Shinra Myōjin's primary role is that of a protector of people partaking in sea journeys. Christine Guth suggests that his role as a protective deity of sailors might reflect his original character. However, despite being a protector of sea routes, he is chiefly worshiped inland. With time, he developed into a mountain god as well. He is the protective deity of Mount Nagara (長等), located close to Onjō-ji. He is considered the surrounding area's genius loci called jinushi. These two roles are closely connected: it has been noted that a close functional connection between sea and mountain deities is well attested through Japanese history, and prayers made to mountain deities to guarantee safe passage through the sea are well documented in Tendai tradition.

In the eleventh century, Shinra Myōjin developed the role of a deity of waka poetry in the Jimon tradition. (Note: Elsewhere it was typically associated with Sumiyoshi.) In this capacity, he was known as the "Poetic Immortal of Mii-dera" (三井の歌仙, Mii no Kasen). This development reflected a broader pattern of incorporating waka into esoteric Buddhism due to its growing role in courtly life. The poems were understood in this context as a Japanese counterpart of dharani. Jimon monks believed that Shinra Myōjin could bestow inspiration upon them, and some of them, for example Gyōson, were known for both their poetry and their devotion to this deity.

Shinra Myōjin is also regarded as a deity of pestilence. Historical sources indicate that he was believed to both cause epidemics and cure illnesses. In has been noted that in a number of accounts, he displays the traits of a tatarigami (祟り神), a deity capable of bestowing both blessings and curses. According to Jimon denki horoku, in 1184 during an epidemic prayers to Shinra Myōjin were performed in the imperial court. Bernard Faure argues that the aspect of his character related to pestilence developed early on. However, Sujung Kim concludes that it was derived from a link between Silla and epidemics in Japanese imagination, which is not yet documented in Heian sources, and only became a common view in the thirteenth century.

== Iconography ==
Shinra Myōjin is typically depicted as an old man dressed in three-pronged Chinese headwear and a red robe, holding a pilgrim's staff and a scroll. His hair is usually white. However, a scroll showing him with dark hair is known from the collection of the Ōtsu City Museum of History. According to Mark Teeuwen, despite his Korean origin, his appearance is "distinctly un-Korean", emphasizing on the Japanese contemporary view on Buddhism and its "alien" and "exotic" nature (coming from India) that was difficult for locals to relate at the time. Teeuwen posits that the Japanese way of depicting Buddhist gods as foreign was their way "to redefine the local in a roundabout manner". Similarly, Sujung Kim describes him as typically having the appearance of a Tang period official, and remarks his iconography shows less variety than those of other similar deities, such as Sekizan Myōjin. It may have been in part based on Taisho Rōnin (大聖老人; also Saishō Rōnin, 最勝老人), a figure belonging to the Mañjuśrī Pentad. (Note: In addition to him and Mañjuśri himself it includes the youth Sudhana (善財童子, Zenzai dōji), the Khotanese king Udayana (優填王, Utennō) traditionally credited with commissioning the first image of the Buddha, and the seventh century Northern Indian, possibly Kashmiri, monk Buddhapāli (仏陀波利, Butsudahari).) His name designates him as a manifestation of Mañjuśri as an old man, as it is a combination of two signs from the full Chinese name of Mañjuśri (大聖文殊師利, Dasheng Wenshu Shili) and the term laoren, "old man", pronounced in Japanese as rōnin; therefore, his iconography might have been adopted for Shinra Myōjin to give him more legitimacy as a Buddhist figure.

While depictions of Shinra Myōjin are relatively rare, a well known statue representing him is kept in Mii-dera, where it is enshrined in the Shinra Zenshindō (新羅善神捨堂). It is hidden due to it being one of the so-called "secret buddhas" (秘仏, hibutsu), statues which cannot be in public view by the powers attributed to them. It is generally agreed upon that it was originally carved no later than in the 12th century, but the precise date is a still debated with the year 1052 been also proposed. It is the oldest surviving depiction of a gohōjin, and has been designated as one of the National Treasures. It can be considered a typical example of a Heian statue utilizing the single wood block technique (ichiboku-zukuri). The face is exaggerated, with the eyes in particular being disproportionately large and slanted in a manner meant to mimic the Chinese numeral 八 (8). However, at the same time with the exception of unnaturally big headwear, the clothing is portrayed in a naturalistic manner, and follows the style typical for the eighth and ninth centuries. Christine Guth notes that the facial features of the statue might be comical to modern audiences, but most likely originally were a way to designate the "otherness" of the depicted deity and his transcendent powers. This artistic convention was widespread in East Asia especially in the late first millennium, and the individual elements of the statue's face and clothing can be compared to Chinese depictions of foreign disciples of the historical Buddha meant to highlight the universality of his teachings and masks used in Bugaku drama. A depiction of a Daoist sage in the Sangoku soshi ei scroll dated to 1150 is considered another close parallel.

While the statue enshrined within Mii-dera is more slender, a painting portraying Shinra Myōjin as more corpulent is observed in Shōgo-in in Kyoto. Yet another depiction of Shinra Myōjin is a painting from the reign of Ashikaga Takauji from Onjō-ji, which portrays him in the garb of a Chinese literatus and shows influence from Chan portraits. The similarities between them might have resulted from the influence of Jimon tradition of Tendai on Shugendō in the Kumano area.

== Associations with other figures ==
Historically Shinra Myōjin was worshiped in Onjō-ji alongside Mio Myōjin (三尾明神), who according to Konjaku Monogatarishū was a deity who appeared to Enchin in the form of an old man eating fish when he first arrived in this area. Furthermore, Shinra Myōjin's two servants, Hannya Dōji (般若童子; depicted with red skin) and Shukuō Dōji (宿王童子; depicted with blue skin), who were venerated as the protectors of children entrusted by their parents to the temple, had small shrines (祠, hokora) in the proximity of their master's own. According to Shinra ryakki (新羅略記), they were born from two parts of a halberd which was originally given by Amaterasu to Susanoo. However, other origin stories are recorded too: they could be alternatively believed to be manifestations of Shinra Myōjin, or servants who came with him from Silla.

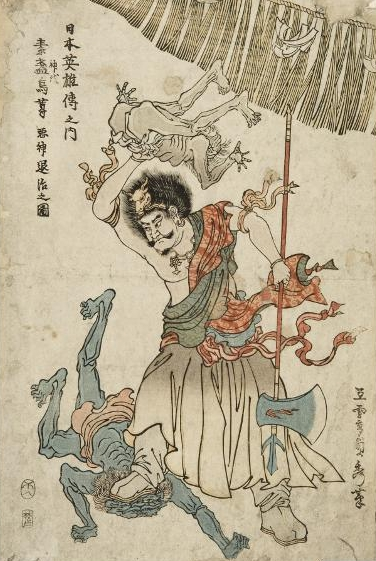
A depiction of Susanoo-Gozu Tennō by Sadahide. It is possible these two deities came to be associated with each other due to their shared connection with Shinra Myōjin.

Shinra Myōjin at some point came to be identified with Susanoo. This connection was already well established among the monks from Onjō-ji in 1210. It is an example of the phenomenon of shinbutsu-shūgō (神仏習合). It developed through the theological speculation of Tendai monks and Shinto scholars from the Urabe clan. However, while the connection is well documented in sources related to the Jimon tradition, it is absent from texts pertaining to Saimon, and Susanoo was instead linked with Matarajin in a similar capacity in the latter context. Most likely identification between Shinra Myōjin and Susanoo was facilitated by the existence of a tradition according to which the latter at some point traveled through the Korean Peninsula. A shared connection with waka was likely another factor. The fact that Shinra Myōjin received swords as offerings during festivals likely was related to the connection between him and Susanoo too, though it is possible this custom was initially derived from a tradition from Silla. The connection between him and Susanoo was promoted during festivals held in Onjō-ji. Multiple variant names of Shinra Myōjin enumerated in the Onjōji denki (園城寺伝記) are phonetic variants of Susanoo. They include Sūgoku (崧嶽), Sūshisu (菘崧), Shusan’ō (朱山王), Shitenfujin (四天夫人 or 天夫人), and Suhatsu Hoshikashi (素髮ホシカシ; according to Sujung Kim "possibly a misspelling of hoshikami 星神, meaning ‘star deity’"). Jimon denki horoku (寺門伝記補録), a fifteenth century supplement to the earlier Onjōji denki, affirms that Shinra Myōjin is identical with Susanoo, describes Izanami as his mother, and states that he traveled through Silla with his son Isotakeru. It also identifies both Shinra Myōjin and Susanoo as Somin Shōrai. Shinra Myōjin also belonged to the network of deities associated with Gozu Tennō. The fact that both Gozu Tennō and Susanoo could be identified with him was also one of the factors leading to the identification between the former two of these deities.

Bernard Faure argues that Sekizan Myōjin can be considered Shinra Myōjin’s "Hieizan counterpart". Sujung Kim outright suggests the two might have originally been the same deity. They were regarded as the protective deities of two rival branches of Tendai, respectively Jimon and Sanmon. The rivalry between the schools was also transferred to corresponding deities: disagreements existed over whether one of them was a servant on the other, while in a narrative about emperor Go-Sanjō both of them appear in his dreams and give contradictory instructions regarding whether an ordination platform should be built in Mii-dera. A number of connections also existed between Shinra Myōjin and Matarajin (摩多羅神), including similar symbolism of their portrayal as old men (okina) in art and shared association with Mañjuśrī. However, despite the links between both of them and Sekizan Myōjin, Matarajin was never referred to as a myōjin himself.

The bodhisattva Mañjuśrī (般若, Hannya) is regarded as the honji of Shinra Myōjin. This connection is mentioned in Onjōji denki, which also states that he was a son of Sāgara. In the Shinra Myōjin ki, he is specifically described as his third son. However, no other deities are ever attributed to Sāgara as sons. In Ryōhen's Nihon shoki maki daiichi kikigaki, Shinra Myōjin is instead described as female and as the second daughter of the same deity.

Shinra Myōjin could also be identified with astral figures, such as Kokuzo or Myōken. He was closely associated with Sonjōō (尊星王). According to Keiran shūyōshū, Shinra Myōjin was the "trace" of Sonjōō, in this context identified with Dakiniten, and as a result "divine foxes" (shinko) were his messengers. Elsewhere Sonjōō was instead closely associated with Myōken, and according to Keihan (慶範; 1155–1221) the two names referred to the same deity respectively in heaven and on earth.

The spirit of Raigō, a historical priest from Onjō-ji, traditionally regarded as an onryō, could also be identified with Shinra Myōjin. A connection between them is mentioned in Onjōji denki, according to which Raigō implored Shinra Myōjin to punish emperor Go-Sanjō for deciding not to authorize the construction of a new ordination platform, to which the god responded by killing the latter. This tradition about Go-Sanjō's death is also documented in the Jimon denki horoku. Another emperor whose death was attributed to Shinra Myōjin was Nijō, who reportedly supported the monks of Mount Hiei over Mii-dera, which prompted the god associated with the latter location to send two acolytes to inflict him with smallpox. (Note: In a variant account, the two deities responsible are Hannya Dōji and Kuroo Myōjin (黒尾明神), a manifestation of Mio Myōjin (三尾明神), an earlier protective deity of Mii-dera.)

== Worship ==
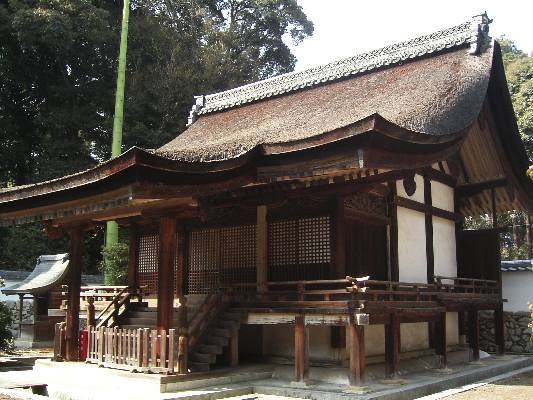
Shinra Zenshindō, a shrine dedicated to Shinra Myōjin.

Shinra Myōjin is regarded as the protective deity of Onjō-ji (Mii-dera). It has been pointed out that the historical Ōmi Province, where the temple is located, had a close connection with Silla, and therefore the presence of Shinra Myōjin might be related to the settlement of Korean immigrants. The Ōtomo clan (not to be confused with the other clans [Ōtomo clan/Ōtomo clan (ancient)] of the same name) in particular was involved in promoting the veneration of this deity early on. The clan is said to have come from multiple origins depending on the source, but a clear relations with Shinra Myōjin can be observed.

Reconstruction of the early history of Shinra Myōjin is complicated by the small number of surviving records from Onjō-ji predating the Muromachi and Edo periods. While according to the temple's tradition a statue representing Shinra Myōjin was already made by Enchin in the ninth century, there is no other evidence supporting this notion. The oldest reference to him occurs in a document from 971. The first known priest of his shrine was a certain Kiyomura (淸村) from the Ōtomo clan, who lived in the tenth century. Various rituals were held in his honor regularly between the eleventh and thirteenth centuries. One of them was known simply as the "Shinra Myōjin festival" (新羅明神祭礼, Shinra Myōjin sairei), and was first held by Myōson in 1052. Shinra Myōjin reportedly revealed to this monk through an oracle that he will act as the protector of the local clergy. While initially only monks took part in his festival, it eventually became one of the largest public celebrations held in Onjō-ji, with a particularly well documented parade involving eleven portable shrines (神輿, mikoshi) taking place in 1210. Other examples of rituals focused on Shinra Myōjin include the Thirty Lectures of the Shinra (新羅三十講, Shinra sanjūkō), possibly a series of lectures focused on the Lotus Sutra, first held in 1202; the Shinra nenbutsu (新羅念仏), first held in 1109 and most likely focused on the recitation of Shinra Myōjin's name to invoke him for the sake of healing and securing longevity, as well as a variety of ennen (延年) celebrations, similarly focused on guaranteeing longevity.

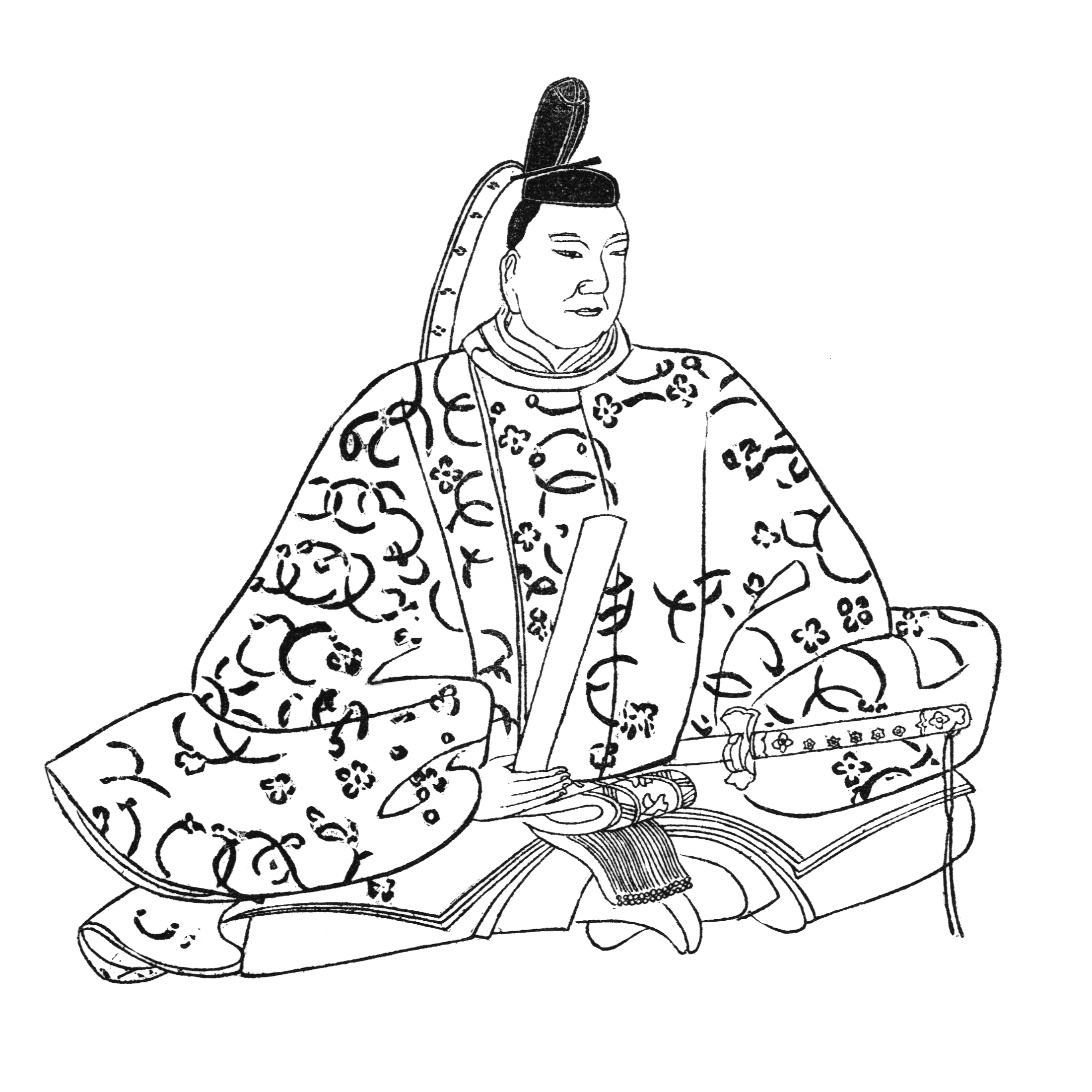
Minamoto no Yoshimitsu, also known as Shinra Saburō due to his connection to the Shinra Myōjin shrine.

Up to the 15th century, members of the Ōtomo clan were the only people maintaining the shrine of Shinra Myōjin, and Shinra Myōjin ki (新羅明神記) credits them with the continuous transmission of his secret rites. However, from the 11th century onward, their power declined, and the Seiwa Genji (清和源氏) branch of the Minamoto clan came to be associated with the Jimon tradition of Tendai as well. Shinra Myōjin came to be regarded as their tutelary deity following the Former Nine Years' War within Minamoto no Yoriyoshi's lifetime (988-1075). Reportedly, he swore that if victorious in this conflict, he would dedicate one of his sons to Onjō-ji. Subsequently, the shrine of Shinra Myōjin served as the site of the coming of age ceremony of Minamoto no Yoshimitsu, his third son. As a result, the sobriquet Shinra Saburō (新羅三郎) was often used to refer to him. Thanks to the influence of their family, the worship of Shinra Myōjin spread outside Ōmi, as far as Hokkaido. A further factor which made it possible to introduce him to new areas was the involvement of the Jimon tradition in the Kumano pilgrimages. Due to being transmitted through this route, he came to be incorporated into the practices of various religious groups in the Kii Peninsula, including pilgrims from the imperial court, Shugendō practitioners, and others.

The veneration of Shinra Myōjin continued in the Edo period, but its scope declined. The Matsumae clan, who from the 17th century onward resided in Matsumae on Hokkaido, considered Minamoto no Yoshimitsu their ancestor, and as attested in Matsumae Kagehiro's Shinra no Kiroku (1646) similarly viewed Shinra Myōjin as their protective deity. He is still worshiped today, and while due to rearrangements made after World War II, the shrine dedicated to him is now separate from the rest of the Onjō-ji complex, services dedicated to him still follow the Instructions for the Buddhist Ritual of the Three Shrines (三社法会法則, Sansha hōe hōsoku), originally compiled in 1367 and subsequently copied by the monk Enshin (圓親) in 1615. They start with "a recitation of the Heart Sutra as an offering to the deity" and additionally focus on "the deity’s connection with Enchin; reciting the title of the Lotus Sutra; a vow to attain enlightenment; Shinra Myōjin’s acolytes;" a prayer for "various kinds of blessings from the deity" serves as the ending.

== See also ==
- Silla
- Buddhism
  - Buddhist art
  - Buddhism in Silla
  - Korean Buddhism
  - Buddhism in Japan
- Kami
  - Susanoo-no-Mikoto
  - Gozu Tennō
