= Ishin =

Ishin may refer to:

== People ==
Given name "Ishin"

- Ishin Iihashi (飯橋 偉進; born 1997), Japanese professional wrestler
- Ishin Nishio (西尾 維新, born 1981, stylized as NisiOisiN), Japanese author
- Ishin Yoshimoto (吉本伊信, 1916–1988), Japanese businessman and Buddhist priest

Surnamed "Ishin"

- Ivan Ishin (Иван Егорович Ишин, 1875–1921), a Tambov Rebellion leader
- Sūden Ishin (以心 崇伝, 1569–1633), Japanese Zen Buddhist monk and Sengoku-era diarist and Shogun advisor
- Vladislav Ishin, a Russian figure skater at the 2013 Russian Figure Skating Championships

=== Fictional characters ===
- Tano Ishin (田野 いしん), the mascot for Tano Station (Kōchi), a train station in Tano, Aki, Kochi, Japan (given named Ishin)

== Places ==
- Ishin Tree, Idofa, Imeko/Afon, Ogun, Nigeria; see List of villages in Ogun State
- Kagoshima, Kagoshima, Japan (nicknamed: Ishin City, City of Ishin); see List of city nicknames in Japan
- Ishin Memorial Park Stadium, Yamaguchi, Yamaguchi, Japan; a sports stadium

== Events ==
- Meiji Restoration (明治維新, Meiji Ishin, 1868), the Japanese revolution that ousted the Shogun and restored the Emperor; also known as the Ishin (the Restoration)

== Groups, organizations, companies ==
Ishin Party

- Japan Restoration Party (日本維新の会, Nippon Ishin no Kai; 2012–2014), a political party in Japan; also called Ishin
- Japan Innovation Party (維新の党, Ishin no Tō; 2014–2016), a political party in Japan; also called Ishin
- Nippon Ishin no Kai (日本維新の会, Japanese Innovation Party; since 2016), a political party in Japan; also called Ishin
- Osaka Restoration Association (大阪維新の会, Ōsaka Ishin no Kai), a political party in Osaka, Japan; also called Ishin

== Other uses ==
- Ishin (異神, eccentric gods), a category of deities found in Japan; see Sekizan Myōjin and Shinra Myōjin
- Like a Dragon: Ishin! (videogame, aka "Ishin!"), a 2014 videogame in the Like a Dragon videogame series
- "Ishin" (song), a song by Sharon, Lois, & Bram, from the 1984 album Mainly Mother Goose
- JDF Ishin, a fictional ship from Innocent Venus; see List of fictional ships

== See also ==
- The dictionary definition of いしん at Wiktionary
- Isin (disambiguation)
- Isshin
