= Matarajin =

Buddhist deity from Japan

- God of obstacles, pestilence, performing arts and destiny
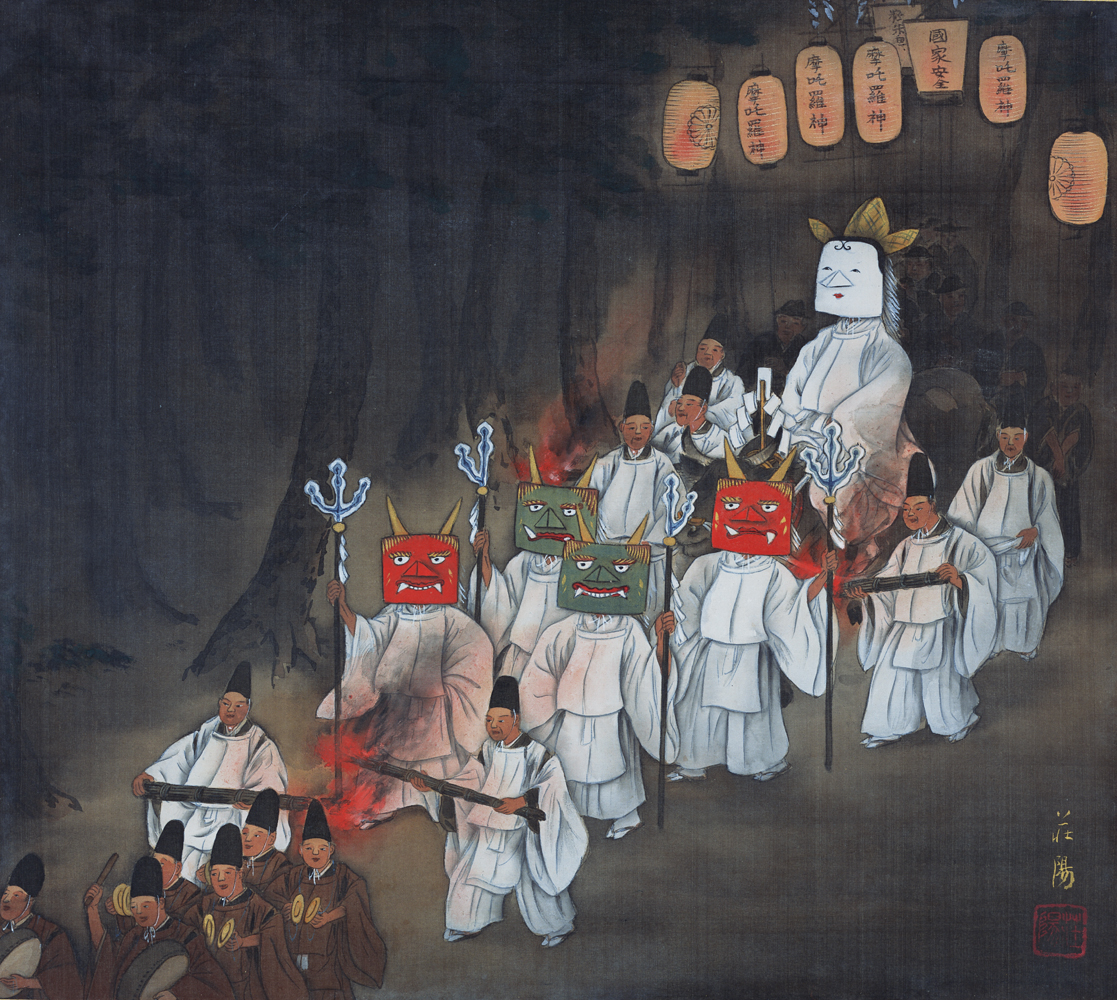
- A depiction of the "ox festival" of Matarajin celebrated in Kōryū-ji in Kyoto.
- Kanji: 摩多羅神
- Major cult center: Mount Hiei
- Symbol: okina mask, drum

Matarajin (摩多羅神) or Madarajin (摩怛哩神) is a Buddhist god chiefly venerated in the Tendai school of Japanese Buddhism. While originally regarded as a wrathful deity obstructing rebirth in the pure land, and thus a "god of obstacles", with time he also came to be seen as a protector of adherents of Tendai doctrine, capable of warding off demons, especially tengu, as well as epidemics. He also acquired other roles, including these of a protector of performing arts (for example noh and sarugaku) and of an astral god of destiny. He additionally came to be identified with a large number of other figures, such as Mahakala, Shinra Myōjin and Susanoo, as a result acquiring some of their characteristics. He could be identified as the wrathful aspect of Amida Buddha as well. Multiple traditions regarding his iconography are documented. Initially he was depicted as a multi-armed and multi-headed deity, but with time he came to be portrayed as a smiling old man dressed like a Japanese aristocrat. He could also be symbolically represented by the okina mask.

Little evidence exists for temples, shrines or mandalas dedicated to Matarajin. It is known that he came to be enshrined in a number of historical Tendai sanctuaries, including Enryaku-ji on Mount Hiei. He was also the central figure in the Genshi Kimyōdan rites. They came under criticism in the Edo period due to efforts to reform Tendai, leading to decline in the worship of Matarajin. He nonetheless continues to be celebrated in the "ox festival" of Kōryū-ji. A hidden statue representing him is also located in Mōtsū-ji, though it can only be seen once every thirty three years.

== Origin ==
The origin of Matarajin has been a subject of scholarly inquiry for a long time. Hayashi Razan (1583-1657) assumed that he developed as a result of conflation between Konpira and a deity associated with Mount Miwa. In the Edo period the Tendai priest Kakujin in his Personal Reflections on Matarajin (摩多羅神私考; Matarajin Shikō), published in 1738, wondered if this deity originated in India, China or Japan. Art historian Kageyama Haruki proposed in 1954 that he originally developed in China, and was introduced to Japan by Buddhist monks. He suggested he might have originally developed through the confusion of Taishan Fujun and Mahakala in the context of esoteric Buddhist mandalas. Today it is assumed that Matarajin's name was derived from the terms mata and matara, Japanese transcriptions of Sanskrit mātṛkā. In the context of historical Japanese Buddhism, these labels refer to deities associated with pestilence. It could also be a designation for stones or tumuli believed to be places where tengu or foxes manifested. Bernard Faure suggests that initially the name Matarajin referred to either the collective of so-called "Seven Mothers", known from the Enmaten mandala, or to the god or gods ruling over them, namely Mahakala, Yama and Vinayaka, though he emphasizes the entities designated by it were at first "ill-defined". Hasuike Toshitaka attempts to instead etymologically connect Matarajin to Zoroastrian Mithra, but this proposal found no support among other researchers.

=== Narratives ===
A tale dealing with the origin of Matarajin's veneration in Japan is preserved in Keiran shūyōshū (溪嵐拾葉集; composed ca. 1311–1347).

When the great teacher Jikaku (Ennin) returned from China to transmit the ritual for the extended vocalized nenbutsu, on his ship he heard a voice in the empty sky, which told him: “My name is Matarajin, and I am a god of obstacles (shōgejin). Those who do not worship me will not be able to attain rebirth.” Consequently, Matarajin was enshrined in the Constantly Walking Samadhi Hall (Jōgyōzanmai-dō).

According to Sujung Kim, most likely the narrative was modeled after an earlier similar tale about Enchin encountering Shinra Myōjin (新羅明神) or another deity or deities, variants of which are known for example from Konjaku Monogatarishū (今昔物語集), Kokon Chomonjū (古今著聞集) and Taiheiki (太平記). Variants of the Matarajin narrative instead state that the first Japanese monk to encounter him was Ennin's master Saichō instead, and place the event in Qinglongsi on Mount Tiantai in China, or on Mount Hiei.

== Character ==
Matarajin has variously been described as a yasha, tengu, fox spirit and god. In modern scholarship, he is considered a member of a class of deities referred to as ijin (異神), translated as "heteromorphic gods" by Bernard Faure and as "eccentric gods" by Sujung Kim. This term has been coined by Yamamoto Hiroko to refer to a variety of figures worshiped in medieval Japan who cannot be classified as either kami or buddhas and bodhisattvas. Veneration of them was typical for esoteric Buddhism but they declined with the rise of more orthodox currents within both Buddhism and Shinto in later periods.

Through history Matarajin morphed from a typical wrathful deity into a god associated with destiny and performing arts. Faure has argued that the change reflected “the transition from a medieval Buddhist ideology still largely indebted to India to an early modern religiosity where the discourse of Mikkyō informs - and is gradually superseded by - other cultural forms, particularly the performing arts.”

Matarajin is primarily considered a "god of obstacles". Initially he was portrayed as a demonic figure obstructing rebirth in Pure Land if not placated. This aspect of his character played a role in a ritual known as "Placating the Tengu" (天狗怖し, tengu odoshi), where he was seemingly treated as a kind of tengu and had to be pacified by engaging in frantic behavior presumably patterned on his own, such as dancing, shouting and reading randomly selected scriptures. At the same time, his presence was apparently believed to ward off other tengu and various other types of demons. Despite his initial role, with time he came to be viewed as a protector of followers of Tendai. Similar inversions of individual figures' roles are common in the history of Japanese esoteric Buddhism.

In addition to symbolically representing spiritual obstacles to enlightenment, Matarajin can also be linked to material calamities, specifically epidemics. Traditions pertaining to the ox festival celebrated in Kōryū-ji indicate he can function as a deity linked to pestilence. This role is also highlighted in Matarajin ku (摩多羅神供) from Senmyō-ji, known from a copy prepared by a certain Ryōchō, where it is stated that he possesses “the numinous power of countering epidemic deities”. As a deity connected with epidemics, Matarajin is sometimes linked to oxen, similarly to Gozu Tennō and Susanoo (celebrated during the Ushinori matsuri, literally "festival of ox riding", in the Yasaka Shrine in Tennō-machi).

It has been suggested that Matarajin's role in the tengu pacification ritual might have led to his association with noh and sarugaku. His related function as a protector of performing arts is the most well known aspect of his character today according to William M. Bodiford. In the tradition of the sarugaku performers from between the eleventh and fourteenth century, he was regarded as the protective deity of the backstage.

Matarajin was also considered a shukujin, a deity considered to have astral character and responsible for the determination of fate. The stars forming the Northern Dipper were believed to be connected to him. The term shukujin could also refer to deities of outcast groups or settlements (shuku), for example sarugaku actors and biwa hōshi. The role of a protector of such social groups is attested for Matarajin.

Matarajin was also considered the god of Buddhist dream techniques, a form of meditation meant to cultivate dream visions, already documented in the writings of the Tiantai monk Zhiyi (538-597). In this context, Matarajin was referred to as a dream king (夢王, muō). Information pertaining to this aspect of his character is known from documents from the Togakushi Shrine, first published in 2001, but originating in the eighteenth century, when it was managed by Buddhist clergy. However, there is no indication that this role was already assigned to Matarajin in earlier periods, and it most likely represents a late development.

In Tōshō-gū in Nikkō, Matarajin came to be worshiped as a tutelary deity of the Tokugawa clan, an attendant of the deified Tokugawa Ieyasu, whose mausoleum is located in the same area. Tenkai enshrined him there in 1617. As a result, in Tōshō-gū he is situated to the right of the main figure, Tōshō Daigongen (a form of Yakushi-nyorai), with Sannō Gongen placed to the left.

== Identification with other figures ==
Through his history, Matarajin was identified with a large number of other figures.

Identification between him and Mahakala, most likely based on the similarity between their names, is known from multiple sources. The process of Hindu devas acquiring new identities first in Indian Buddhism and subsequently in East Asian Buddhism is well documented. A deity worshiped near the Eastern Pagoda on Mount Hiei, Ina Tenjin (移那天神), was historically identified as Matarajin and as a manifestation of Mahakala. According to the writings of the Tendai monk Kōshū (1276-1350), Matarajin was regarded as either identical with Mahakala or as one of the demonic dakinis accompanying him, and was believed to devour livers. This was considered to be a way to help those negatively impacted by heavy karma with reaching a pure land faster, similarly as in the case of analogous beliefs about other dakinis. Most likely this tradition depended on the Chinese monk Yi Xing's description of dakinis, known from his commentary on the Mahavairocana Sutra from 725. Dakiniten and Matarajin could be associated with each other, though their conflation is better attested in Shingon than Tendai, and in the latter the two were only linked by the Kurodani branch. A text dated to 1361 identifies Matarajin with Dakiniten as a deity fulfilling wishes. A stone said to resemble a white fox located near the main hall of Enryaku-ji is referred to as Matara Tenjin in various documents, despite being associated with Dakiniten. The Edo period work Reflections on Inari Shrine (稲荷神社考, Inari jinja kō) lists both Matarajin and Dakiniten among names which could be assigned to fox spirits, alongside Izuna Gongen, Yashajin and Fuku daijin. It states that "a three-faced and six armed deity is the true form of these Matarajin and wild foxes".

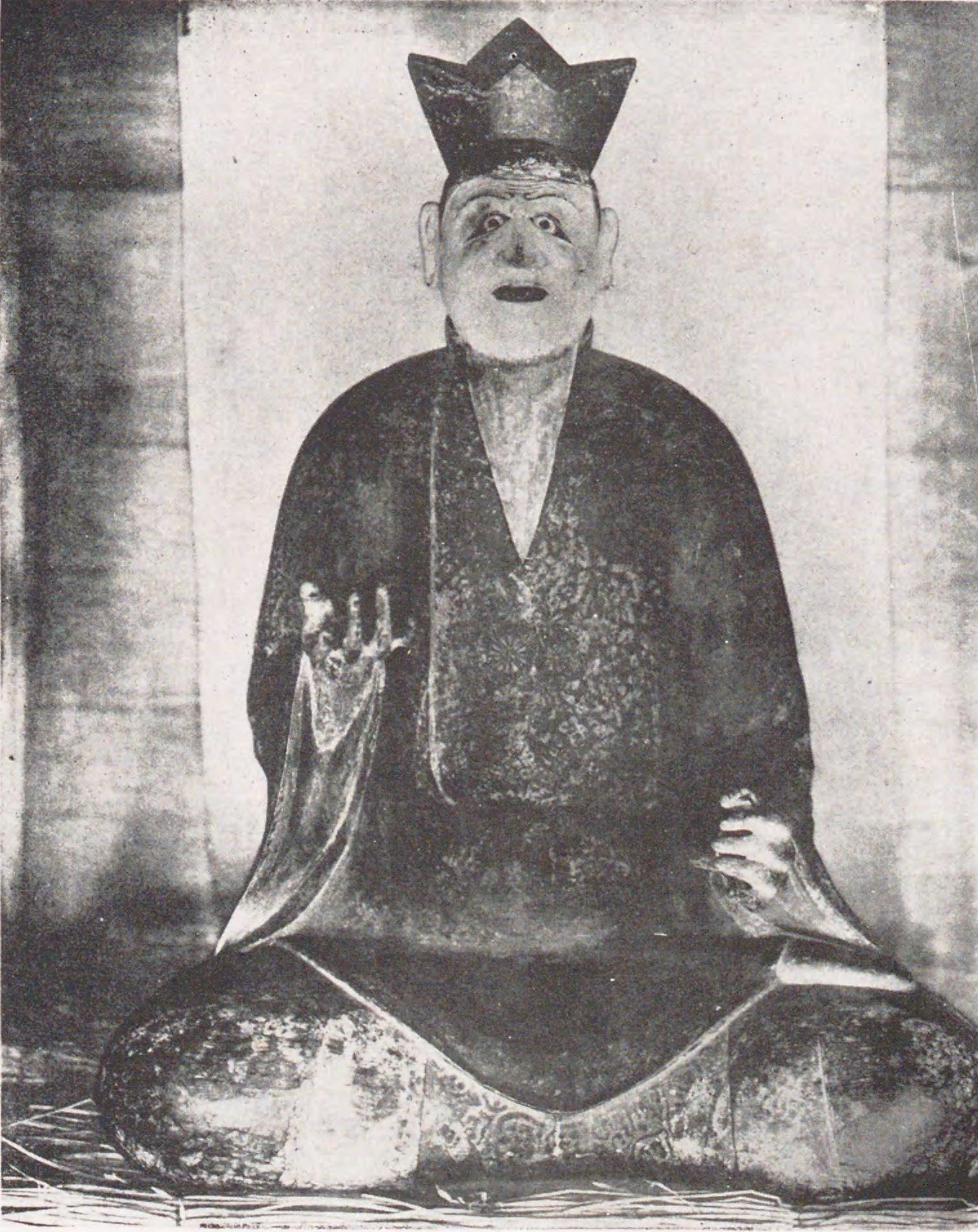
A statue of Shinra Myōjin from Mii-dera

A network of connections leading to exchange of attributes existed between Matarajin, Shinra Myōjin (新羅明神) and Sekizan Myōjin (赤山明神) The latter two were originally regarded as protectors of two rival branches of Tendai. Shinra Myōjin was associated with the Jimon tradition, while Sekizan Myōjin with Sanmon, with the former centered on Mii-dera and the latter on Mount Hiei. Despite the connection between them, Matarajin never acquired the title of myōjin (明神; "bright deity") himself. Through his association with Sekizan Myōjin, Matarajin also developed a connection to Taizan Fukun. The latter was conflated to him as a god of destiny, though in origin he was a Daoist figure comparable to Buddhist Enma. As Sekizan Myōjin's name was derived from the name of a mountain, Sekizan (Chishan in Shandong), the link might have originally relied on both of them being Chinese mountain gods of similar character.

A further deity who could be identified with Matarajin was Susanoo, possibly due to analogies between the latter and Shinra Myōjin. This tradition is documented in a text from Gakuen-ji, which states that after being buried there Susanoo came to be worshiped under the name Matarajin, as well as in sources compiled by adherents of the Sanmon tradition on Mount Hiei and from Hinomisaki, a branch shrine of Izumo-taisha. Additionally, Jimon denki horoku, dated to the Muromachi period, states that "Susanoo has many traces, among them Matarajin and Gozu Tennō in India, the god of Mount Song in China, and the great Silla deity (Shinra Taijin) in Japan". Sange yōryakki explains that "Susanoo, who is also called Matarajin" enabled Saichō to return safely from his journey to China because he prayed to this deity. In Nihon Shoki kikigaki, a commentary on the Nihon Shoki, Yoshida Kanemigi listed Matarajin, but also Shinra Myōjin, Banko, Yama, and Kōjin as figures identified with Susanoo. Matarajin and Kōjin could be identified with each other as well, for example as deities associated with causing obstacles. In the Kōjin saimon, the eponymous deity is said to be "fundamentally existing, born-at-the-same-time Matarajin". As an extension of his link with Susanoo, Matarajin also developed a similar connection with the epidemic deity Gozu Tennō. In addition to the conflation of the two, in one of the reinterpretations of the cycle of myths focused on Susanoo, Matarajin and a horde of demons under his command assist him when he attacks Amaterasu.

During the Muromachi period, Matarajin came to be merged with Okina (翁), a figure originating in sarugaku and noh performances. The word okina means old man, but in the context of these performing arts it designates a specific mask, play and deity. Okina might be identical with Shukujin understood as a singular deity rather than a category, as indicated by Konparu Zenchiku in his work Meishuku shū (明宿集), in which he envisioned a complex network of connections between various shukujin, regarding all of them as manifestations of a single figure. He does not directly mention Matarajin among them, though it is nonetheless sometimes assumed that he might be implicitly referenced in a cited tale about the origin of sarugaku. It has also been pointed out that both Matarajin and another figure linked to shukujin, Hata no Kawakatsu, are associated with the Kōryū-ji temple in Kyoto.

Matarajin could also be regarded as a manifestation of Amida Buddha, specifically of his "wheel-commanding body" ( 教令輪身, kyōryōrinshin), a term which in the nomenclature of esoteric Buddhism designates the wrathful aspect of a buddha. This idea might have initially developed because the latter was the central object of worship in the so-called "constantly walking samādhi", while the former was enshrined as the protector of the halls it was practiced in.

According to Eison, the founder of the Shingon Ritsu, Matarajin had the face of Mañjuśrī; in later tradition influenced by his teachings the two deities could outright be identified with each other. As an extension of the link between Matarajin and Mañjuśrī, the okina mask could serve as the symbol of the latter from the middle of the Kamakura period onward.

== Iconography ==
Shukaku Hōshinō's Shūyōshū contains a description of a statue of Matarajin, characterized as a "strange deity" (奇神, kishin), and a "yaksha deity" (夜叉神, yashajin) with six arms and three faces: white face of Dakiniten on the left, golden face of Shoten in the center, and red face of Benzaiten on the left. The three faces might have represented the concept of three poisons (hatred, concupiscence and anger). However, it is not clear why the images of these three specific deities were combined to form a depiction of Matarajin. While it is assumed that the portrayal of Matarajin as a typical wrathful deity in art was the oldest iconographic tradition, no known works of art depicting him this way survive, with the only exception being an image of Mahakala labeled as "Matarajin" in Bukkyō zuzō shūsei.

A different image of Matarajin developed with time, that of an old man deity comparable to Japanese jinushi. The change has been compared to the better documented development of the iconography of Daikokuten from that of Mahakala. Matarajin is commonly portrayed wearing an eboshi and kariginu (a type of robe worn in informal contexts), both of which were historically associated with Japanese aristocracy. He strikes a drum and is typically depicted smiling. Many such images of Matarajin show two acolytes accompanying him, Chōreita Dōji (丁令多童子), who holds ginger leaves and also strikes a drum, and Nishita Dōji (爾子多童子) who holds bamboo leaves and dances. They could correspond to bodhisattvas Fugen and Monju. Together with Matarajin they could represent both the three truths and "the oneness of the three truths and the three poisons". In some cases, the big dipper was represented above this group of deities. A famous example of such a depiction of Matarajin is Tenkai's painting from Rinnō-ji, dated to 1617. The oldest preserved depiction of Matarajin comes from Kiyomizu-dera. Gakuen-ji also possesses a representation of Matarajin, which has been displayed during the Izumo-taisha exhibition at the Kyoto National Museum in 2012.

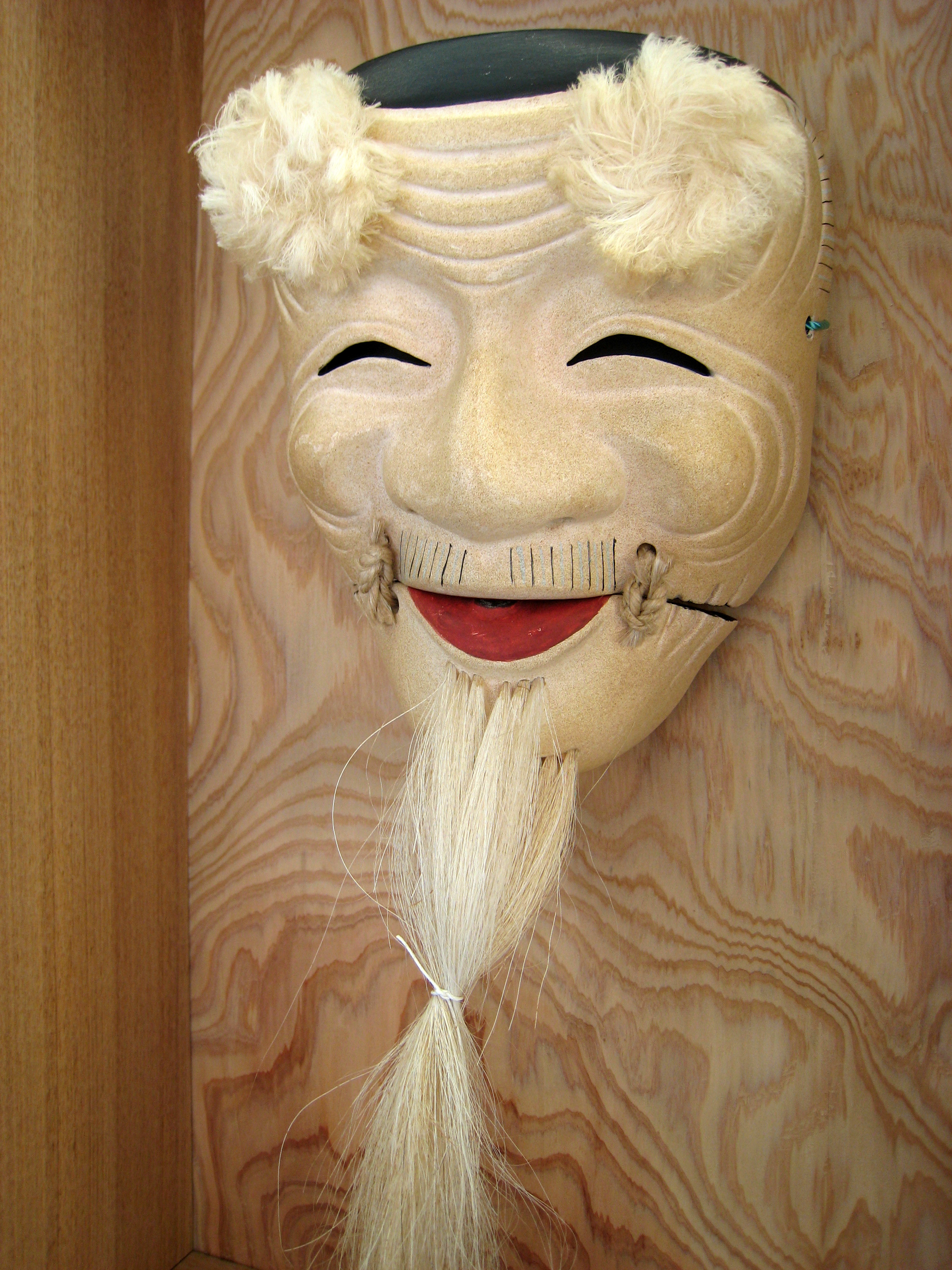
An okina mask

A sixteenth century document from the Kanze Shinkurō house identifies the okina mask as a representation of Matarajin. It is assumed that between the eleventh and fourteenth century, sarugaku performers customarily performed dances in front of statues of Matarajin during which they wore the okina mask to represent the venerated deity. Danzan Jinja, a contemporary Shinto shrine which replaced Tōnomine, a Tendai temple associated with the Fujiwara clan, is in possession of an okina mask kept in a box labeled as "Matara".

== Worship ==
There is little evidence for shrines, temples or mandalas dedicated to Matarajin. However, he was nonetheless commonly worshiped through the medieval and early modern periods. It has been argued was typically venerated in the backdoor area of temples (後戸; ushirodo). However, William M. Bodiford has argued that little direct evidence exists for this assumption, and most primary sources instead state that Matarajin was enshrined to the left of images of Amida. At Enryakuji Matarajin was venerated as the guardian of the Jōgyō Zanmai-dō (常行三味堂), the "Hall of Constant Perambulation". He was also venerated in other similar meditation halls, for example in Tōnomine, in Mōtsuji in Hiraizumi and in Gakuenji in Izumo. Near the end of the Heian period, a shrine dedicated to him has been established in one of the branch temples (matsuji) of Enryakuji, Gakuenji, a monastery located near the Izumo shrine. According to the accounts of the monks Shukaku Hōshinō (1150-1202) and Gōhō (1306-1362), a protective figure of Matarajin was also housed in Tō-ji, at the time the main temple of the Shingon school. The former is the oldest presently known reference to this deity. Reportedly Kūkai was credited with introducing him to this temple. In Kumano Shugendō practitioners, who saw Matarajin as a tengu-like deity, worshiped him at sites known for their numinous stones, some of which could be inscribed with his name. Bernard Faure has proposed that he was likely also worshiped by Korean immigrants who settled in Japan, for example by the Hata clan.

=== Genshi Kimyōdan ===
Matarajin was an important figure, following Kageyama Haruki's interpretation possibly even the honzon, in Genshi Kimyōdan (元旨歸命壇), a Tendai ritual which originated on Mount Hiei. Few primary sources pertaining to it survive. Texts related to it often mention the dance of Matarajin and his entourage known from art, and explain it as a representation of twelve nidānas. It has been argued that some of the performances might have contained sexual allusions. Specifically, a song associated with Matarajin's two underlings, consisting of the alternating nonsensical phrases shishirishi ni shishiri alternating with sosoroso ni sosoro has historically been interpreted as allusion to sex organs or to sounds of pleasure, though this notion is based on only on texts presumed to be polemical, and finds no direct support in Genshi Kimyōdan itself. According to Bernard Faure, the rituals might have originally been apotropaic, as indicated by references to their performance during New Year celebrations.

=== Decline ===
The worship of Matarajin, especially Genshi Kimyōdan, came under criticism in Reikū Kōken's Repudiation of Heresies (Hekija hen), published in 1698. It was a part of a broader effort to reform Tendai, patterned on Siming Zhili's campaign of purifying Tiantai from perceived negative influence of Chan and Huayan traditions. Genshi Kimyōdan rites were compared to Tachikawa-ryū, a current in the Shingon school similarly condemned as heretical. Eventually, the veneration of Matarajin was prohibited on Mount Hiei, though he continued to be worshiped in peripheral Tendai centers, such as Hiraizumi. By the 1720s, he became a deity obscure even for Tendai clergy, as evidenced by handwritten notes left on the margins of a number of known manuscripts, many of which highlight his absence from texts from outside Japan. In the following decades, he came to be perceived negatively. The Shingon monk Tainin Myōryū, relying on Reikū Kōken's work, in 1782 declared him to be a "false icon created by the stupidest of stupid folks". The nativist scholar Amano Sadakage, relying on the same source, condemned the worship of Matarajin as a "deviant" form of Buddhism.

=== Recent history ===
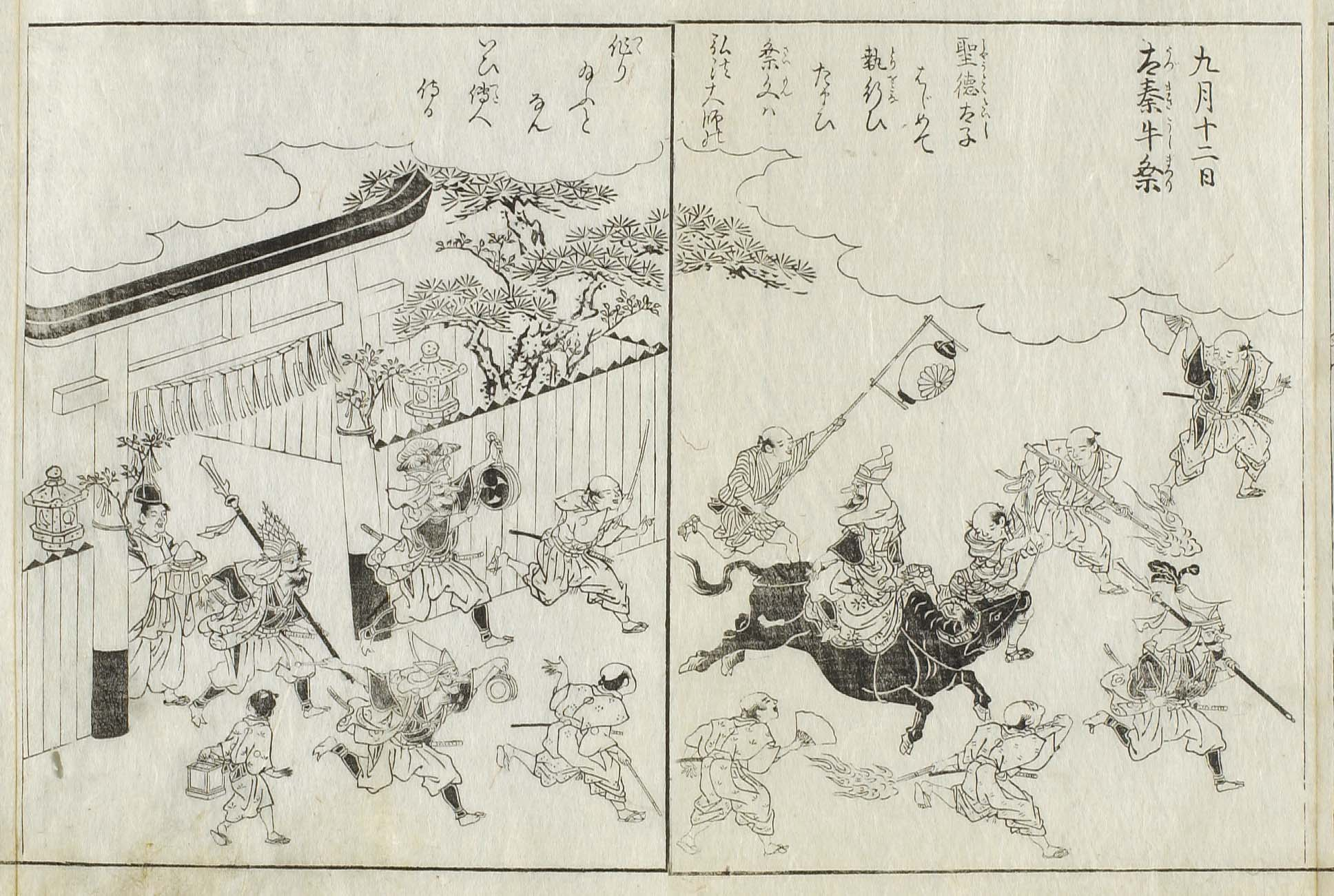
An Edo period illustration showing the ox festival

Due to his marginal importance in the nineteenth century, Matarajin was not targeted during the early Meiji shinbutsu bunri policies, though for a few years the ox festival (ushi matsuri) dedicated to him in Kōryū-ji in Kyoto was not performed. Examples of texts documenting this celebration are known from copies as early as 1402 and 1549. After the break it started to be celebrated again in 1887. It takes place at night on the 12th of October. During the ceremony a priest rides on a black ox. He recites a formula meant to eliminate all calamities and bring happiness, wears a mask representing Matarajin, and is accompanied by four monks dressed as red and green demons, symbolically representing the Four Devas. It is said that the mask still used today was originally prepared by Tomioka Tessai for the 1887 restoration of the festival. The festival has historically enjoyed a degree of popularity due to its carnival-like atmosphere.

In Mōtsū-ji a hidden figure of Matarajin can be seen once every thirty three years. It was last put on display between the 15th of September and 15 November in 2000.
