= Isshin =

Isshin (いっしん) is a Japanese word which may refer to:

== Places ==
- Isshin-ji, a Pure Land Buddhist temple in Osaka, Japan

== Martial arts ==
- Isshin-ryū, a modern style of karate
- Isshin-ryu kusarigamajutsu, Japanese martial art using the chain and scythe weapon called kusarigama

== Individuals ==
- Isshin Chiba (千葉 一伸; born 1968), Japanese voice actor who currently works for Arts Vision
- Isshin Hishikawa (菱川 一心; born 2005), better known B-boy Issin, Japanese bboy
- Isshin Inudo (犬童 一心; born 1960), Japanese film director

== Characters ==
- Isshin Ashina, a boss from Sekiro: Shadows Die Twice created by FromSoftware
- Isshin Kurosaki, a fictional character in the popular anime and manga series Bleach created by Tite Kubo
- Isshin Matoi, a fictional character in the anime series Kill la Kill
- Isshin Tasuke, a fictional Japanese person

== See also ==
- Ishin
