= Kōga Saburō =

Japanese folklore character

Kōga Saburō (甲賀三郎) is a character in Japanese folklore associated with the Suwa region.

== Summary ==
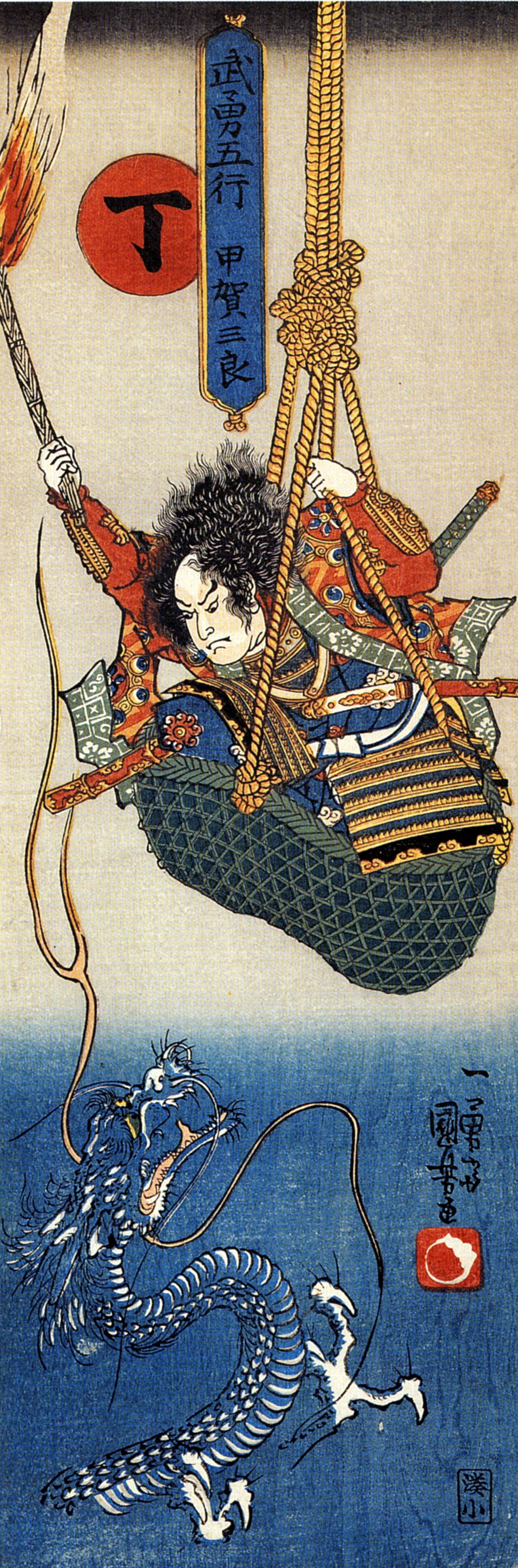

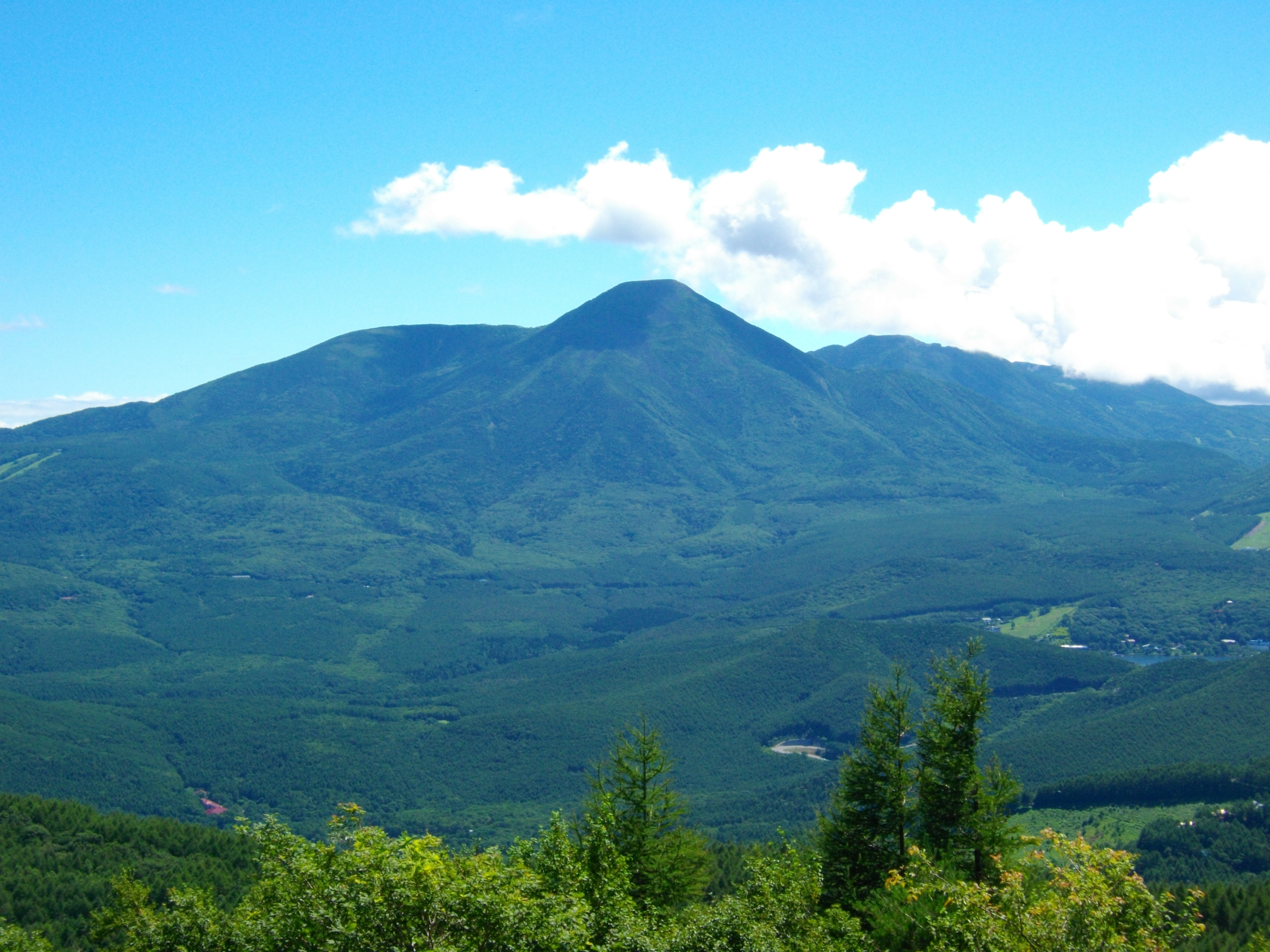
Mount Tateshina on the border of the municipalities of Chino and Tateshina in Nagano Prefecture.

Many variants on the basic story exist; the following summary is based on the earliest literary version of the tale found in the Shintōshū.

The third son of a local landlord of Kōka District in Ōmi Province, a distinguished warrior named Kōga Saburō Yorikata (甲賀三郎諏方) was searching for his lost wife, Princess Kasuga (春日姫 Kasuga-hime) in a cave in Mount Tateshina in Shinano, with his two elder brothers. The second brother, who was jealous of Saburō's prowess and fame and who coveted Kasuga, traps the latter inside the cave after they had rescued the princess.

With no way out, Saburō has no choice but to go deeper into the cave, which was actually an entrance to various underground realms filled with many wonders. After travelling through these subterranean lands for a long period of time, he finally finds his way back to the surface, only to find himself transformed into a giant snake or dragon. With the help of Buddhist monks (who turn out to be gods in disguise), Saburō regains his human form and is finally reunited with his wife. Saburō eventually becomes Suwa Myōjin, the god of the Upper Shrine of Suwa, while his wife becomes the goddess of the Lower Shrine.

This version of the legend explains the origin of the name 'Suwa' (諏訪 or 諏方) via folk etymology as being derived from Saburō's personal name, Yorikata (諏方).

== Origins ==
It has been proposed that the Kōga Saburō legend arose as a result of the collapse of the Kamakura shogunate and the downfall of the Hōjō clan, which the Suwa clan, the high priestly house of the Upper Suwa Shrine, had faithfully served as retainers. The status and prestige of the clan and the shrine's high priest, the Ōhōri (大祝), revered as a living god, having been diminished in the aftermath of these events, localized stories about the shrine's deity such as that of Kōga Saburō began to be favored and circulate in various areas.

== Variants ==
Japanese scholar Hiroko Ikeda classified the tale, in the Japanese tale index, as type 301A, "Kooga Saburoo's Journey" (Kooga Saburoo).

There are a number of variants on the basic tale; some see Kōga reunited with his wife (and suggest that they had a son together in the underworld), some involve his two brothers joining him on the search, others include him fighting against a resident serpent god before becoming one himself.

The story of Kōga Saburō was adapted into a kabuki play, Kōga Saburō in the Cave in around 1808.

== Bibliography ==
- Fukuda, Akira; Nihonmatsu, Yasuhiro; Tokuda, Kazuo, eds. (2015). 諏訪信仰の中世―神話・伝承・歴史 (Suwa shinkō no chūsei: shinwa, denshō, rekishi). Miyai Shoten. ISBN 978-4838232888. (in Japanese)
- Kanai, Tenbi (1982). 諏訪信仰史 (Suwa shinkōshi). Meicho Shuppan. ISBN 978-4626001245. (in Japanese)
