= Shintōshū =

Japanese religious book

The Shintōshū (神道集) is a Japanese setsuwa collection in ten volumes, believed to date from the Nanboku-chō period (1336–1392). It illustrates with tales about various shrines the Buddhist honji suijaku theory, according to which Japanese kami were simply local manifestations of the Indian gods of Buddhism. This theory, created and developed mostly by Tendai monks, was never systematized but was nonetheless very pervasive and influential. The book had thereafter great influence over literature and the arts.

== History ==
The book is believed to have been written during the late Nanboku-chō period, either during the Bunna or the Enbun era. It carries the note Agui-saku (安居院作; made by Agui) but who exactly wrote it is unclear. Divided into ten volumes and 50 chapters, it supports the Tendai and Ise Shinto honji suijaku theory according to which Japanese kami were simply local manifestations of the Indian gods of Buddhism. This theory was never systematized but became nonetheless the most important tool through which foreign Buddhism was reconciled with local kami beliefs. The book illustrates it through tales dedicated to various shrines and to the Buddhist gods which are the true nature of the kami they enshrine. It deals mostly with shrines located west of Tonegawa in Kōzuke province (like Akagi Daimyōjin, Ikaho Daimyōjin and Komochiyama Daimyōjin), the Kumano Sanzan and other Kantō shrines, explaining the reason for their kami's rebirths, and telling tales about their previous lives.

The common point of the tales is that before being reborn as a tutelary kami of an area, a person must first be born and suffer there as a human being. The suffering is mostly caused by relationships with relatives, especially wives or husbands.

The book had a great impact on the literature and arts of the following centuries.
