= Myōjin =

Japanese Shinto deities

Myōjin (明神 'shining deity', 'illuminating deity', or 'apparent deity') or Daimyōjin (大明神 'great shining/apparent deity') was a title historically applied to kami ('Japanese deities') and, by metonymy, their shrines.

The term is thought to have been derived from 'notable deity' (名神, myōjin), a title once granted by the Imperial Court to kami deemed to have particularly impressive power and virtue and/or have eminent, well-established shrines and cults. This term is first attested in the Shoku Nihongi, where offerings from the kingdom of Balhae are stated to have been offered to "the eminent shrines (名神社, myōjin-sha)) in each province" in the year 730 (Tenpyō II). (Note: 「庚戌。遣使奉渤海信物於諸國名神社。」)

An epithet homophonous with this imperially bestowed title, "shining/apparent kami" (written with different Chinese characters), was in popular usage from around the Heian period up until the end of the Edo period, coexisting with titles with more explicit Buddhist overtones such as 'incarnation' (権現, gongen) or daibosatsu (大菩薩 'great bodhisattva').

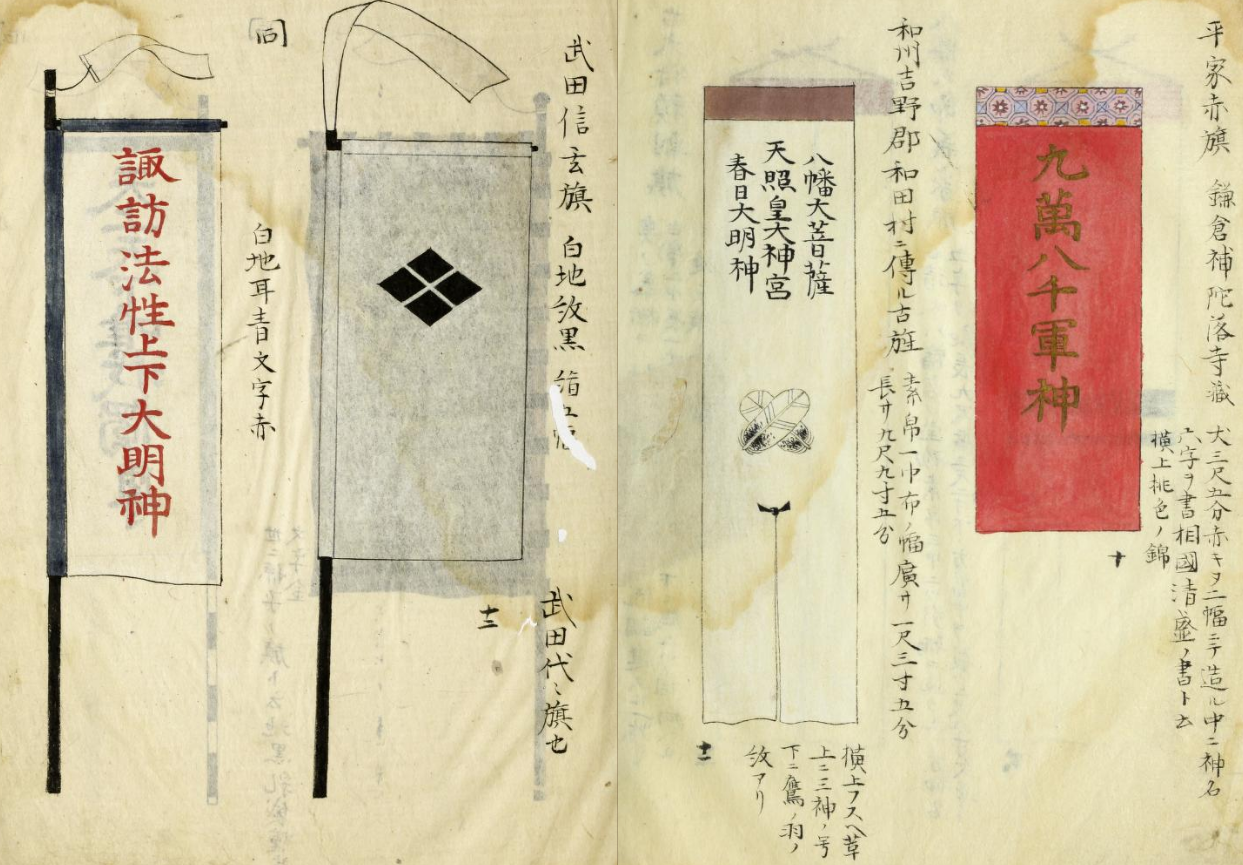
A depiction of war banners used by the Taira clan (right) and Takeda Shingen (left). The leftmost banner (white with blue border and red lettering) carries the inscription Suwa Hosshō Kamishimo Daimyōjin (諏訪法性上下大明神), while on the second banner from right (white with black lettering), flanking the legend Tenshō Kōtaijingū (天照皇大神宮) are inscribed Hachiman daibosatsu (八幡大菩薩) and Kasuga Daimyōjin (春日大明神).

The earliest recorded usages of 'shining/apparent deity' are found in sources such as in the Sumiyoshi-taisha Jindaiki "Sumiyoshi taisha's Records of the Age of the Gods" (住吉大社神代記), supposedly compiled in the year 731 but thought to actually be of a much later date, which refers to the Sumiyoshi sanjin as Sumiyoshi Daimyōjin (住吉大明神)), and the Nihon Sandai Jitsuroku (completed in 901), which refers to the 'Matsuo Daimyōjin' (松尾大明神).

While at first this title did not yet seem to have the Buddhist connotations that would later be associated with it, the connection between daimyōjin with the concept of honji suijaku, i.e. that native kami are actually manifestations of Buddhist deities, was reinforced by an apocryphal utterance of the Buddha often claimed to be derived from the Karuṇāpuṇḍarīka-sūtra (悲華經)) quoted and alluded to in various medieval works, but which is not in the actual sutra's text: "After I have passed into nirvana, during the Latter Day of the Law, I shall appear as a great shining/apparent deity (大明神) and save all sentient beings." (Note: 「我滅度後、於末法中、現大明神、広度衆生。」)

Up until the early modern period, use of titles such as myōjin or gongen for many deities and their shrines were so widespread that these gods were rarely referred to by their proper names. For instance, both Takemikazuchi, the kami of Kashima Shrine and the shrine itself were known as Kashima Daimyōjin (鹿島大明神); Takeminakata, enshrined in Suwa taisha, was called Suwa Daimyōjin (諏訪(大)明神), and so on. (cf. Hachiman-daibosatsu, 八幡大菩薩, or Kumano Gongen, 熊野権現). After his death, Toyotomi Hideyoshi was deified under the name 'Toyokuni Daimyōjin' (豊国大明神).

Under Yoshida Shintō, the conferral of ranks and titles like myōjin was institutionalized, with the sect issuing out authorization certificates to shrines for a fee. The sect considered the title to be higher than the overtly Buddhist gongen as part of the sect's inversion of honji suijaku, an issue which became a point of contention with the Sannō Ichijitsu Shintō (山王一実神道) sect spearheaded by the Tendai monk Tenkai.

When the Meiji government officially separated Shinto from Buddhism, official use of titles and terminology perceived as having Buddhist connotations such as (dai)myōjin, (dai)gongen or daibosatsu by shrines were legally abolished and discouraged. However, a few deities/shrines are still often referred to as (dai)myōjin in popular usage even today. (E.g. Kanda Myōjin in Chiyoda, Tokyo, enshrining the deified onryō 'vengeful spirit' of Taira no Masakado).

== See also ==
- Category:Myōjin Taisha, shrines
- Honji suijaku
- Shinbutsu bunri, the official separation of Shinto from Buddhism during the Meiji period
- Shinbutsu-shūgō, the syncretism of Buddhism and native kami worship
