= Mikkyō =

Japanese form of Esoteric Buddhism

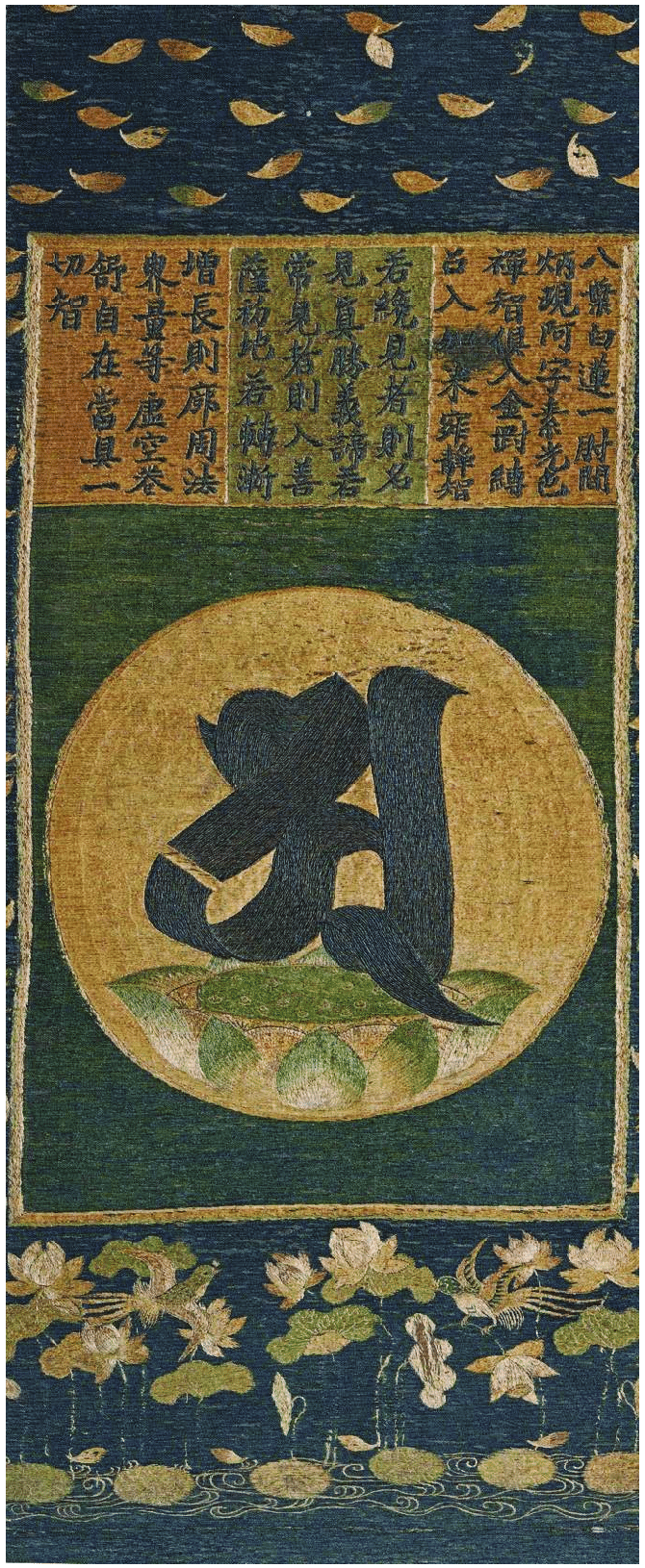
- The Siddham syllable "A" as used in the iconography of Ajikan (阿字觀, "meditating on the letter A")

Chinese name
- Traditional Chinese: 密教
Transcriptions
Standard Mandarin
- Hanyu Pinyin: mì jiào

Japanese name
- Kanji: 密教
- Kana: みっきょう
Transcriptions
- Romanization: mikkyō

Mikkyō (Japanese: 密教, romanized: mikkyō, from Japanese: 秘密仏教, romanized: himitsu bukkyō, lit. 'secret Buddhism'), or Japanese Esoteric Buddhism, is the lineage of Vajrayana Buddhism transmitted to Japan, primarily in the early Heian by Kūkai, and to a later extent by Saichō and his successors such as Ennin. It consists of complex systems of icons, meditative rituals, and ritual languages distinct from the exoteric (kengyō, 顕経) schools.

Mikkyō is descended most recently from Tangmi, especially the dual mandala system taught by Huiguo, itself derived from Indo-Chinese tantric masters such as Amoghavajra. Shingon focuses almost exclusively on esotericism, while Tendai views exoteric and esoteric doctrines as complementary. Shugendō is a syncretic tradition which integrates mikkyō with Shintō and Taoist practices. Esoteric practices are diffused throughout the Japanese Buddhist tradition in various forms outside of these schools.

Mikkyō has been influential in Japanese culture and history, shifting aristocratic court culture away from the Confucian ritsuryō political structure, and contributing to the development of Japanese literature through waka and the development of the kana syllabary.

== History ==
In older Chinese literature, the term esoteric is used rhetorically to "designate what this or that writer feels is superior or best in the tradition." Aaron Proffitt argues that "'Esoteric Buddhism' can be taken as a synonym for Mahayana Buddhism itself" in particular contexts, where it takes a polemical rather than descriptive function. The "esoteric" appellation was applied Mahayana to distinguish it from other vehicles as early as the 5th century. The Dà zhìdù lùn (Treatise on the Great Perfection of Wisdom) distinguishes between esoteric (mimi, 祕密) and exoteric (xianshi, 顯示) Buddhadharma:

In the exoteric [form], the Buddha, pratyekabuddha, and arhat are all fields of merit since their defilements have been exhausted without residue. In the esoteric [form], it is explained that bodhisattvas attain the acquiescence to the nonproduction of the dharmas...

In the 9th century Kūkai introduced his own esoteric-exoteric taxonomy, theorizing the esoteric as always-already present in the exoteric teachings, while simultaneously the consummation and highest form of those teachings. He similarly presents Shingon as "vajrayana of secrecy", separate from both the Mahayana and Hinayana teachings. Kūkai used a number of other terms for his lineage, such as the "mantra treasury" and kongōjō (金剛乗), literally "vajra vehicle". Taimitsu (台密) and Tōmitsu refer to the esoteric lineages of Tendai and Shingon respectively. Historically, shingon was largely interchangeable with mikkyō; sources often refer to Tendai esotericism as "the shingon of the Tendai lineages."

Elements such as mantra, dharani, and various esoteric texts were already present in Japan before Kūkai. Dōshō, Dōji, Simsang, Kaimei, and other clerics introduced esoteric sutras to Japan before the Heian era. Ōya Tokujō used the term nanmitsu (南密) to refer to this Nara-period esotericism.In the 17th century, sectarian scholars began distinguishing between zomitsu and junmitsu, or "miscellaneous esotericism" and "pure esotericism" respectively, to describe the disparate, diffused esoteric elements versus the highly structured approach of the Shingon and Tendai schools. This distinction was introduced by the Tokugawa priest Ekō (1666-1734). Ryūichi Abe is critical of this taxonomy, noting that Kūkai himself imported various zomitsu scriptures, while the junmistu Vairocanābhisaṃbodhi Sūtra, understood as the primary source of Kūkai's school, was already circulating in Japan before Kūkai's first travels to China.

== Theory and practice ==
Scholarly approaches to mikkyō often stress the attainment of Buddhahood "in this very body" (sokushin jōbutsu, 即身成佛), or within one's lifetime. This is achieved through the practice of the "Three Mysteries" (sanmi, 三密) of mudra, mantra, and mandala. These correspond to body, speech, and mind respectively. The Three Mysteries "awaken beings to the true nature of reality" which is constituted by the identity of all things with Mahāvairocana. This is a "process of mutual interpenetration" referred to as nyū ga gan yū (入我我入, "entering me, me entering").

=== Dual-mandala system ===
Kūkai introduced the integrated practice of the "Womb realm mandala" (Sanskrit: Mahākaruṇā-garbhodbhava-maṇḍala, 胎藏界曼荼羅) and the "Vajra realm mandala" (Sanskrit: Vajradhātu-maṇḍala, 金剛界曼荼羅) to Japan from Huiguo. These mandalas correspond, respectively, to the Mahāvairocana and the Vajraśekhara sutras.

=== Abhiṣeka ===
Abhiṣeka (kanjō) is a "ritual of passage," based on classical and medieval coronation rites, that initiates a student into esoteric practice.

=== Ajikan ===
Ajikan (阿字觀) is a form of ritual meditation on the Siddham syllable "A", the seed syllable (Skt. bīja mantra) for Vairocana. Kukai's Precious Key to the Secret Treasury gives a brief overview of the practice:

Visualize: a white lotus flower with eight petals, [above which is a full moon disc] the size of a forearm in diameter, [in which is] a radiant silvery letter A. Unite your dhyāna with prajñā in an adamantine binding; Draw the quiescent prajñā of the tathāgata [into your mind].

== Influence ==
Mikkyō "functioned as a practical technology that had a direct bearing on medieval politics and economy". Fabio Rambelli interprets mikkyō "as an ensemble of knowledge [...] implemented through interpretive strategies, repertoires of metaphors, and a general structuring of knowledge."

Buddhism justified writing in the Japanese language, whereas earlier periods favored Classical Chinese. Medieval Mikkyō understood native Japanese waka poetry as sacred literature analogous to mantras, and many prominent waka poets, such as Henjō and Saigyō, were Esoteric Buddhist clergy. Kūkai is traditionally attributed with the invention of the kana syllabary and composing the Iroha. Ton'a relates a legend (among many circulating in medieval Japan) that Kūkai developed the kana to facilitate the work of carpenters who were building the stupa at Mount Koya. While certainly apocryphal, "the systematic importation of Sanskrit...encouraged the emergence of the native script of kana characters", the derivation of the gojūon from siddhaṃ "point[s] to the reason underlying the belief widespread in the medieval period that Kūkai was the inventor of the kana syllabary."

== Bibliography ==
- Abe, Ryūichi (2000). The Weaving of Mantra. New York: Columbia University Press. ISBN 0-231-11287-4.
- Hakeda, Yoshito (1972). Kūkai: Major Works. New York: Columbia University Press. ISBN 978-0231059336.
- Knutsen, Roald (2011-08-15). Tengu. Folkestone: Global Oriental. ISBN 978-90-04-21802-4.
- Orzech, Charles D. (2006). "The "Great Teaching of Yoga," the Chinese Appropriation of the Tantras, and the Question of Esoteric Buddhism". Journal of Chinese Religions. 34 (1). Informa UK Limited: 29–78. doi:10.1179/073776906803525165. ISSN 0737-769X.
- Payne, Richard K. (1998-05-01). Re-Visioning 'Kamakura' Buddhism. Honolulu: University of Hawaii Press. ISBN 978-0-8248-2078-7.
- Payne, Richard K. (1999). "The Shingon Ajikan : Diagrammatic Analysis of Ritual Syntax". Religion. 29 (3): 215–229. doi:10.1006/reli.1998.0179. ISSN 0048-721X.
- Rambelli, Fabio (1994). "True Words, Silence, and the Adamantine Dance: On Japanese Mikkyō and the Formation of the Shingon Discourse". Japanese Journal of Religious Studies. 21 (4). Nanzan University: 373–405. ISSN 0304-1042. JSTOR 30234141.
- Proffitt, Aaron P. (2023-04-30). Esoteric Pure Land Buddhism. University of Hawaii Press. ISBN 978-0-8248-9380-4.
- Orzech, Charles; Sørensen, Henrik; Payne, Richard (2011). Esoteric Buddhism and the Tantras in East Asia. Leiden: BRILL. ISBN 978-90-04-18491-6.
