= Bernard Faure =

Asian religion scholar

Bernard Faure (born 1948) is a Franco-American author and scholar of Asian religions, who focuses on Chan/Zen and Japanese esoteric Buddhism. His work draws on cultural theory, anthropology, and gender studies. He is currently a Kao Professor of Japanese Religion at Columbia University and an Emeritus Professor of Religious Studies (and formerly Professor of Chinese Religions) at Stanford University. He also previously taught at Cornell University, and has been a visiting a professor at the University of Tokyo, the University of Sydney, and the École Pratique des Hautes Études in Paris. He co-founded the Center for Buddhist Studies at Stanford University and the ARC: Asian Religions and Cultures Series within Stanford University Press. He is also the founder and co-director of the Columbia Center for Buddhism and East Asian Religions (C-BEAR). His work has been translated into several Asian and European languages.

== Education ==
Faure graduated from the Institut d’Études Politiques as well as the École Nationale des Langues Orientales Vivantes in Paris and received a Doctorat d’État from the Université de Paris-VII in 1984. He also conducted research at Kyoto University for many years.

== Bibliography ==
Faure has written a number of books in French and English, including:

- Les Mille et Une Vies du Bouddha, Editions du Seuil (2018)
- The Fluid Pantheon, University of Hawaii Press (2015)
- Protectors and Predators, University of Hawaii Press (2015)
- Le Traité de Bodhidharma: Première Anthologie du Chan, Le Seuil (2012)
- L’imaginaire Zen: L’Univers Mental d’un Moine Bouddhiste Japonais, Les Belles Lettres (2010)
- Unmasking Buddhism, Wiley-Blackwell (2008)
- Bouddhisme et Violence, Le Cavalier Bleu (2008)
- The Power of Denial: Buddhism, Purity and Gender, Princeton University Press (2003)
- Double Exposure: Cutting against Western and Buddhist Discourses, Stanford University Press (2003)
- The Red Thread: Buddhist Approaches to Sexuality, Princeton University Press (1998)
- The Will to Orthodoxy: A Critical Genealogy of Northern Chan Buddhism, Stanford University Press (1997)
- Chan Insights and Oversights: an Epistemological Critique of the Chan Tradition, Princeton University Press (1996)
- Visions of Power: Imagining Medieval Japanese Buddhism, Princeton University Press (1996)
- Bouddhisme, Liana Levi (1996), translated into English, German, Dutch, and Italian
- Le Bouddhisme, Flammarion (1996)
- The Rhetoric of Immediacy: A Cultural Critique of Chan/Zen Buddhism, Princeton University Press (1994)
- La Mort Dans les Religions d’Asie, Flammarion (1994)
- Le Bouddhisme Chan en Mal d’Histoire, EFEO (1989)

He has edited or co-edited the following works:

- “The Way of Yin and Yang (Onmyōdō)," special issue of the Cahiers d’Extrême-Asie (2014)
- "Japanese Buddhism and the Performing Arts (geinō)," special issue of Journal of Religion in Japan (2013)
- “Shugendō," special issue of the Cahiers d’Extrême-Asie (2011)
- "Medieval Shinto," special issue of the Cahiers d’Extrême-Asie (2008)
- Chinese Poetry and Prophecy by Michel Strickmann, Stanford University Press (2005)
- Chan Buddhism in Ritual Context, RoutledgeCurzon (2003)
- “Buddhist Priests, Kings, and Marginals: Studies on Medieval Japanese Buddhism," special issue of the Cahiers d’Extrême-Asie (2002-2003)
- Chinese Magical Medicine by Michel Strickmann, Stanford University Press (2002)

He has also published a large number of articles, including most recently:

- "Buddhism’s Black Holes: From Ontology to Hauntology”, International Journal of Buddhist Thought & Culture 27 (2) (2017)
- "Can (and Should) Neuroscience Naturalize Buddhism?”, International Journal of Buddhist Thought & Culture 27, 1 (2017)
- “Buddhism Ab Ovo: Aspects of Embryological Discourse in Medieval Japanese Buddhism”, in Anna Andreeva and Dominic Steavu, eds., Transforming the Void: Embryological Discourse and Reproductive Imagery in East Asian Buddhism, Brill (2015).
- “Indic Influences on Chinese Mythology: King Yama and his Acolytes as Gods of Destiny” in Meir Shahar and John Kieschnick, India in the Chinese Imagination (2013)
- “The Impact of Tantrism on Japanese Religious Traditions: The Cult of the Three Devas” in Ivstan Keul, ed., Transformations and Transfer of Tantra in Asia and Beyond, Walter de Gruyter (2012)
- “A Gray Matter: Another Look at Buddhism and Neuroscience” in Tricycle (2012)
- “Buddhism and Symbolic Violence” in Andrew Murphy, ed. The Blackwell Companion to Religion and Violence, Blackwell (2011)
- “From Bodhidharma to Daruma: The Hidden Life of a Zen Patriarch” in Japan Review 23 (2011)
- “In the Quiet of the Monastery: Buddhist Controversies over Quietism” in Common Knowledge 16 (2010)
