= Honji suijaku =

Japanese Buddhist theory incorporating kami into the Buddhist pantheon

The term honji suijaku or honchi suijaku (本地垂迹) in Japanese religious terminology refers to a theory widely accepted until the Meiji period according to which Indian Buddhist deities choose to appear in Japan as native kami to more easily convert and save the Japanese. The theory states that some kami (but not all) are local manifestations (the suijaku (垂迹), literally, a "trace") of Buddhist deities (the honji (本地), literally, "original ground"). Thus, for example, the deity Amaterasu was considered a trace of Dainichi Nyorai (Great Sun Buddha).

According to the theory, the two elements form an indivisible whole called gongen, and in theory should have equal standing, but this was not always the case. In the early Nara period, for example, the original ground (honji) was considered more important and only later did the two come to be regarded as equals. During the late Kamakura period some theories proposed that the kami were the original deities and the buddhas their manifestations (see the Inverted honji suijaku section below).

Honji suijaku theory was never systematized but it was nonetheless very pervasive and very influential on Japanese religions. It is considered the keystone of the shinbutsu-shūgō (syncretism of Buddhist deities and Japanese kami) edifice. Honji suijaku has often been seen as similar to interpretatio Romana, a mode of comparison promoted in antiquity by scholars such as Tacitus who argued that barbarian gods were just the foreign manifestations of Roman or Greek deities.

== History ==
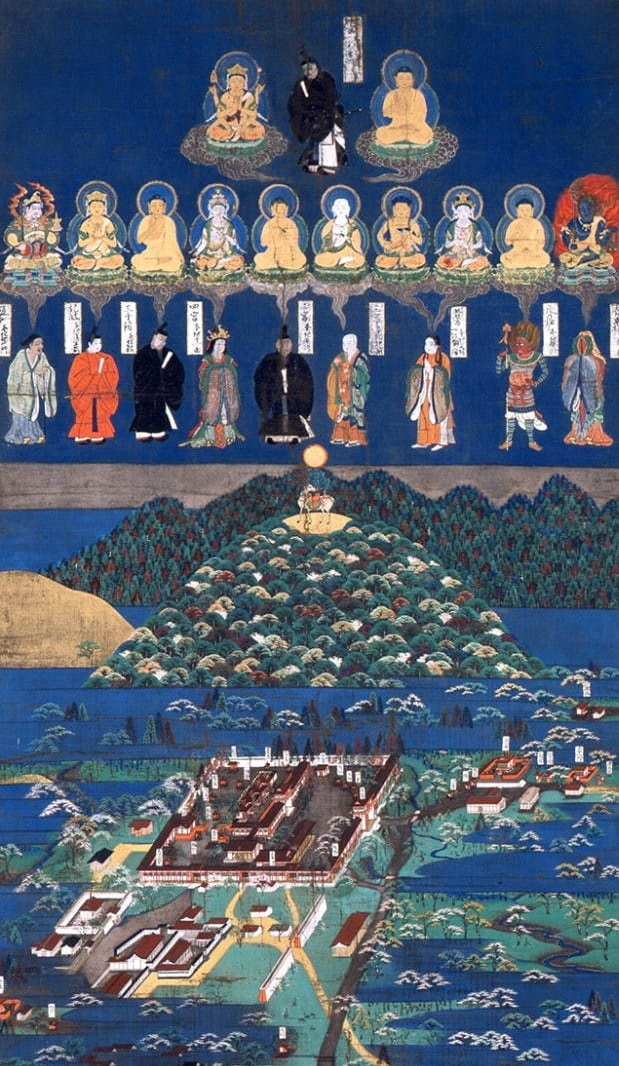
A mandala showing Buddhist deities and their kami counterparts

Early Buddhist monks did not doubt the existence of kami but saw them as inferior to their buddhas. Hindu deities had had the same reception: They were thought of as non-illuminated and prisoners of saṃsāra. Buddhist claims of superiority, however, encountered resistance; monks tried to overcome it by deliberately integrating kami in their system. Japanese Buddhists themselves wanted to somehow give the kami equal status. Several strategies to do this were developed and employed, and one of them was the honji suijaku theory.

The expression was originally developed in China and used by Tendai Buddhists to distinguish an absolute truth from its historical manifestation (for example, the eternal Buddha from the historical Buddha, or the absolute Dharma from its historical forms, the first being the honji, the second the suijaku). The term makes its first appearance with this meaning in the Eizan Daishiden, a text believed to have been written in 825. The honji suijaku theory proper later applied it to buddhas and kami, with its first use within this context dated to 901, when the author of the Sandai Jitsuroku says that "mahasattvas (buddhas and bodhisattvas) manifest themselves at times as kings and at times as kami." The dichotomy was applied to deities only in Japan and not, for example, in China.

A different but equivalent explanation, the idea that Buddhist deities choose not to show themselves as they are, but manifest themselves as kami, was expressed in a poetic form with the expression wakō dōjin (和光同塵), which meant that to assist sentient beings, deities "dimmed their radiance and became identical to the dust of the profane world." Their brightness would otherwise be such to destroy mere mortals.

In the 10th and 11th centuries there are numerous examples of Buddhist deities and kami pairings: The deities are usually Kannon, Yakushi, Amida or Shaka Nyorai. The association between them was usually made after a dream or revelation made to a famous monk, later recorded in a temple's or shrine's records. By then, kami in Japan were universally understood to be the form taken by buddhas to save human beings, that is, local manifestations of universal buddhas. Around the beginning of the Kamakura period the pairings had become solidly codified in large temples or shrines. The frequency of the practice is attested by the kakebotoke (懸仏), or "hanging buddhas," found in many large shrines—metal mirrors that carry on the front the effigy of the shrine's kami and on the rear the relative Buddhist deity. The name shows that they are usually hung from a shrine's outer wall.

As the theory gradually spread around the country, the concept of gongen ("provisional manifestation", defined as a Buddha that chooses to appear to the Japanese as a kami) evolved. One of the first examples of gongen is Hie's famous Sannō Gongen (山王権現). Under the influence of Tendai Buddhism and Shugendō, the gongen concept was adapted, for example, to religious beliefs tied to Mount Iwaki, a volcano, so that female kami Kuniyasutamahime became associated with Jūichimen Kannon Bosatsu (eleven-faced Kannon), kami Ōkuninushi with Yakushi Nyorai, and Kunitokotachi no Mikoto with Amida Nyorai.

== Practice ==
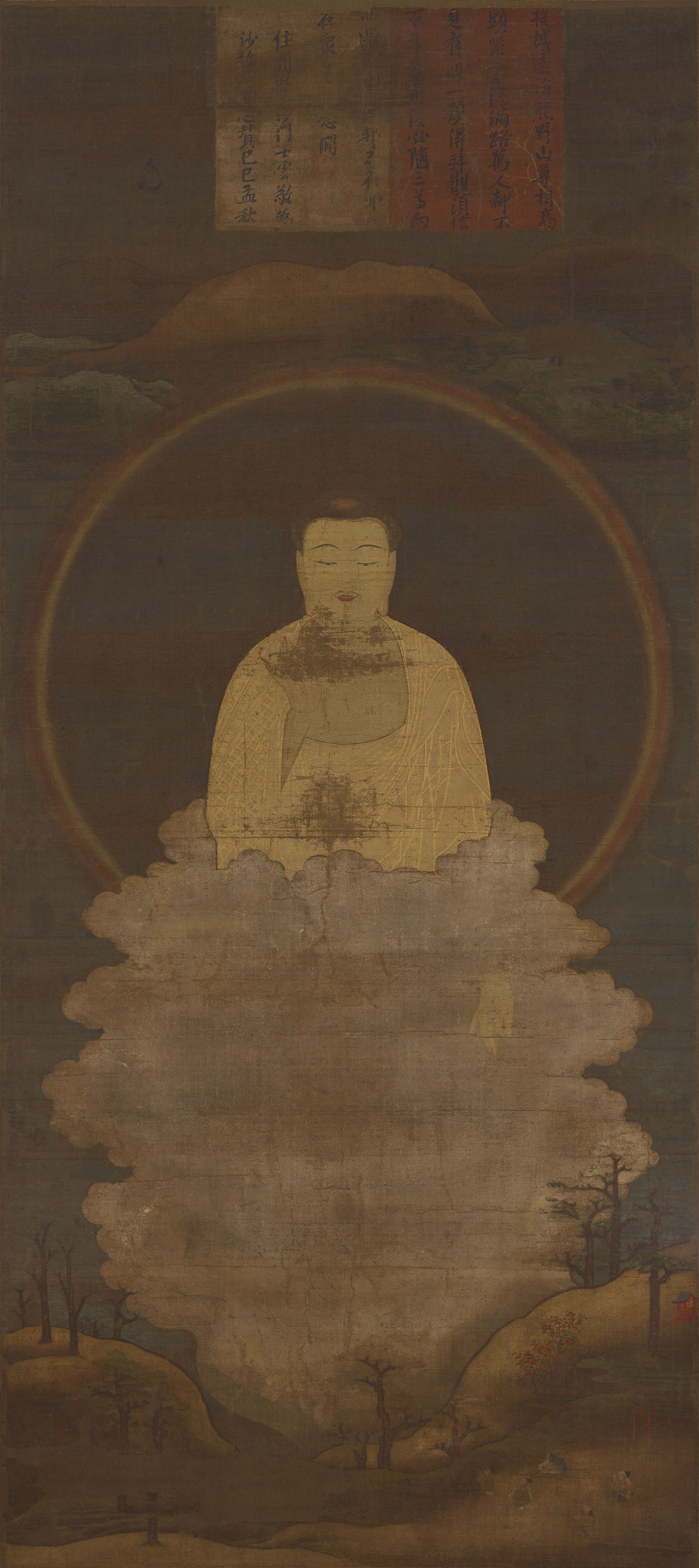
Manifestation of Kumano Gongen (Dannōhōrinji), a manifestation of Amida Buddha at the Kumano shrine

The honji suijaku paradigm remained a defining feature of Japanese religious life up to the end of the Edo period. Its use was not confined to deities but was often extended even to such historical figures as Kūkai and Shōtoku Taishi. It was claimed that these particular human beings were manifestations of kami, which in turn were manifestations of buddhas. Sometimes the deity involved was not Buddhist. This could happen because the theory was never formalized and always consisted of separate events usually based on a temple or shrine's particular beliefs.

Nothing was fixed: A deity could be identified both as a honji and a suijaku in different parts of the same shrine, and different identifications could be believed to be true at the same time and place. The religious situation during the Middle Ages was, therefore, confused and confusing. Historians have tried to concentrate on the reformers of that age with a clear philosophy and little interest in kami questions because they are easier to understand. The theory was ultimately beneficial to the kami, which went from being considered unilluminated outsiders to actual forms assumed by important deities. The ultimate expression of this shift is Ryōbu Shintō, in which Buddhist deities and kami are indivisible and equivalent like the two sides of a coin.

The use of the honji suijaku paradigm was not limited to religion—it had important consequences for society in general, culture, art and even economy. Buddhism, for example, proscribed fishing, hunting, and agriculture because they involved the killing of living beings (insects, moles and the like in the case of farming), but the honji suijaku concept permitted people to void the prohibition. If one fished for oneself, the reasoning went, you were guilty and should go to hell. However, if the catch was offered to a kami that was a known emanation of a buddha, the gesture had an obvious karmic value and was permissible. The idea allowed the forbidding of individual, and therefore uncontrolled, economic activity. Applied as it was to all major economic activities, this interpretation of honji suijaku allowed a thorough control of popular dissent.

How important the concept was can be understood from how the idea that some local phenomenon may be somehow linked to an absolute and sacred object found extensive application in the medieval and early modern periods. It was often said that temple lands in Japan were local emanations of Buddhist paradises or that an artisan's work was one with the sacred actions of an Indian Buddha.

== Art ==
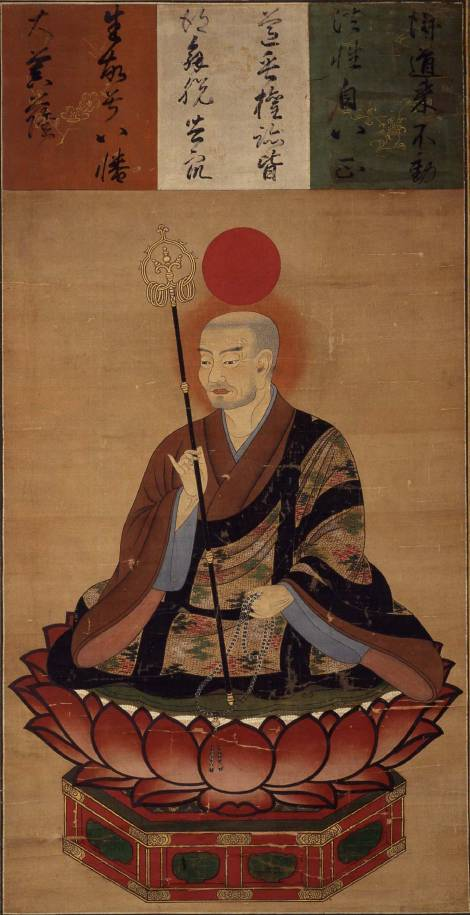
Kami Hachiman in Buddhist attire

The honji suijaku paradigm found wide application in religious art with the Honji Suijaku Mandara (本地垂迹曼荼羅) or Songyō Mandara (尊形曼荼羅). The Honjaku Mandara (本迹曼荼羅) (see image above) shows Buddhist deities with their kami counterparts, while the Honjibutsu Mandara (本地仏曼荼羅) show only Buddhist deities, and the Suijaku Mandara (垂迹曼荼羅) show only kami.

The Sōgyō Hachiman (僧形八幡), or "Hachiman in priestly attire", is one of the most popular syncretic deities. The kami is shown dressed as a Buddhist priest and is considered the protector of people in general and warriors in particular. From the 8th century on, Hachiman was called Hachiman Daibosatsu, or Great Bodhisattva Hachiman. That he is dressed like a Buddhist priest is probably meant to indicate the sincerity of his conversion to Buddhism. By the 13th century, other kami would also be portrayed in Buddhist robes.

=== Shintōshū ===
The Shintōshū is a book in ten volumes believed to date from the Nanboku-chō period (1336–1392). It illustrates with tales about shrines the honji suijaku theory. The common point of the tales is that, before reincarnating as tutelary kami of an area, a soul has first to be born and suffer there as a human being. The suffering is mostly caused by relationships with relatives, especially wives or husbands.

The book had great influence over literature and the arts.

== Inversion ==
The dominant interpretation of the buddha-kami relationship came to be questioned by what modern scholars call the inverted honji suijaku (反本地垂迹, han honji suijaku) or shinpon butsujaku (神本仏迹) paradigm, a theology that reversed the original theory and gave the most importance to the kami. Supporters of the theory believed that, while those who have achieved buddhahood have acquired enlightenment, a kami shines of his own light. The doctrine was first developed by Tendai monks, and its first full formulation is attributed to Jihen, a monk tied to the great Ise shrine who was most active around 1340. In the first fascicle of the Kuji hongi gengi he argued that, in the beginning, Japan had only kami and that only later did buddhas take over. He believed that for this reason there had been a decadence in the country's morals and that a world where kami dominated would soon reappear. In the fifth fascicle of the same work, he compared Japan to a seed, China to a branch and India to a flower or fruit. Just like flowers that fall and return to the roots, India had come back to its roots, the kami were the honji and the buddhas their manifestations.

Yoshida Kanetomo, a Japanese Shinto priest of the Sengoku period, was influenced by these ideas and brought them further, making a clean break with the past, bringing inverted honji suijaku to maturation as the new Yoshida Shintō.

While it is usually claimed that inverted honji suijaku was a reaction of native cults to the dominance of Buddhism, it also came out of Buddhist intellectualism. The theory is not per se anti-Buddhist and does not question the existence of buddhas but simply seeks to invert the established order of importance between kami and buddhas. Why Buddhists should develop such a theory to the detriment of their own divinities is unclear, but it is possible that it was developed by shrine monks, or shasō, who took care of the shrine part of temple-shrine complexes to enhance their status.
