= Gozu Tennō =

Japanese plague deity, historically conflated with Susanoo

- God of plague, pestilence, and health
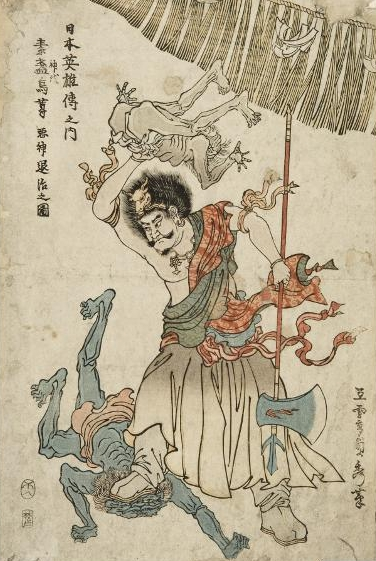
- Susanoo-no-Mikoto as Gozu Tennō subjugating asuras (demons) by Sadahide
- Other names: Mutō-no-Kami (武塔神); Mutō Tenjin (武塔天神); Gion Daimyōjin (祇園大明神)
- Japanese: 牛頭天王, 牛頭天皇
- Affiliation: Bhaiṣajyaguru (honji), Susanoo
- Major cult center: Yasaka Shrine (formerly); Hiromine Shrine (formerly); Tsushima Shrine (formerly); Take-dera
- Weapon: axe, noose, sword, halberd

Genealogy
- Consort: Harisaijo
- Children: The Hachiōji (Eight Princes)

Gozu Tennō (牛頭天王; Ox-Headed Heavenly King) is a Japanese shinbutsu-shūgō (syncretic) deity of disease and of healing. Originally imported to Japan from mainland Asia, he was regarded since the Heian period both as a causer of and protector against epidemics and eventually became amalgamated with the native kami Susanoo-no-Mikoto during the medieval and early modern periods.

During the Meiji period, when the government mandated shinbutsu bunri, the separation of Shinto and Buddhism, Shinto shrines dedicated to Gozu Tennō of the Gion cult tradition such as Yasaka Shrine in Gion, Kyoto or Tsushima Shrine in Tsushima, Aichi Prefecture or Hiromine Shrine in Hyōgo Prefecture officially reidentified their enshrined deity as Susanoo-no-Mikoto.

== Overview ==
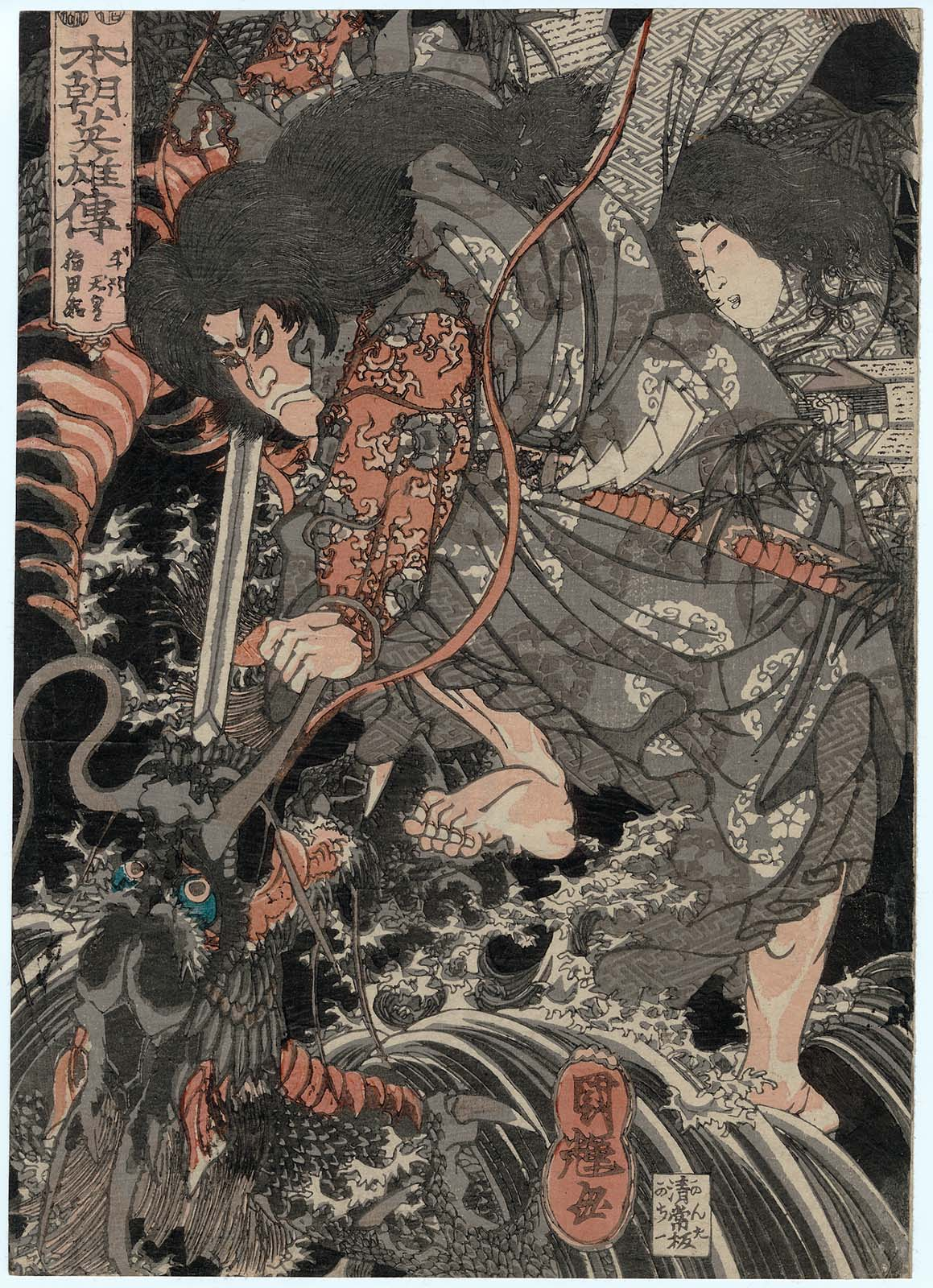
Susanoo-no-Mikoto defeating the Yamata no Orochi by Kuniteru. The caption at the upper left identifies Susanoo as Gozu Tennō.

The origins and early development of the Gozu Tennō cult prior to its arrival in Japan, as well as the process of its amalgamation with other deities, are unclear and a matter of debate. One theory claims that Gozu Tennō was originally a minor Buddhist deity regarded as the protector of the vihāra (Buddhist monastery) of Jetavana, with his Sanskrit name being reconstructed either as Gavagrīva "Ox-Necked" or Gośirsa Devarāja "Ox-Headed Divine King" (a calque of 'Gozu Tennō'). From India, the deity's cult was supposedly transmitted to Japan via Tibet and China, where it was influenced by esoteric Buddhism and Taoism. Another theory proposes a Korean origin for the deity.

Gozu Tennō was historically identified with a number of deities, foremost among these being Susanoo no Mikoto, the impetuous storm god of classical Japanese mythology, and Mutō-no-Kami (武塔神), an obscure deity who appears in the legend of Somin Shōrai. The story recounts that Mutō was a god from the northern sea who stayed at the house of a poor man named Somin Shōrai after Somin Shōrai's wealthy brother refused to provide him with lodgings. Mutō later provided Somin Shōrai's family a magical means to save themselves from future epidemics as a reward for their hospitality and slew the rich man who rejected him. The earliest extant version of this legend dating from the Nara period (surviving in an extract quoted in a medieval work) has Mutō revealing himself to be Susanoo, suggesting that the two deities were already being conflated during the 8th century, if not earlier.

Sources that equate Gozu Tennō with Susanoo first appear during the Kamakura period (1185–1333), although one theory supposes that these three gods and various other disease-related deities were already loosely coalesced around the 9th century, probably around the year 877 when a major epidemic swept through Japan. In later versions of the Somin Shōrai legend, the deity in the story came to be identified as Gozu Tennō, who at this stage had become more or less synonymous with both Susanoo and Mutō (though one source instead applies the name 'Mutō' to Gozu Tennō's father).

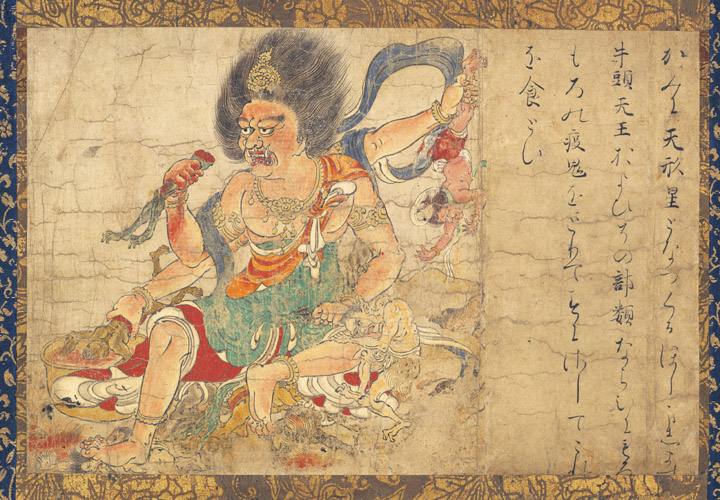
Late Heian period painting of the deity Tenkeisei or Tengyōshō (天刑星, Star of Heavenly Punishment) subduing and devouring demons of pestilence. Gozu Tennō is shown here being seized by Tenkeisei with his upper left arm.

The idea that Gozu Tennō had Korean roots stems in part from his association with these two gods. Mutō's name for instance is believed to derive from the Korean word mudang, female Korean shaman, while a story recorded in the Nihon Shoki (720 CE) claims that Susanoo, after his banishment from Takamagahara, came down to a place called Soshimori in the land of Silla and from there crossed the sea to Japan. Indeed, the epithet gozu "ox-head(ed)" has been explained as being derived from Soshimori, here interpreted as a Korean toponym meaning "Bull's (so) Head (mari)".

The concept of cow heads in Korea, specifically Silla, can be found in the title Uzumasa (太秦) of the Hata clan. The Hata are believed to have arrived from Silla in the 5th century, having brought many of its elements that are shared across Japanese history and archaeology.

== Iconography ==
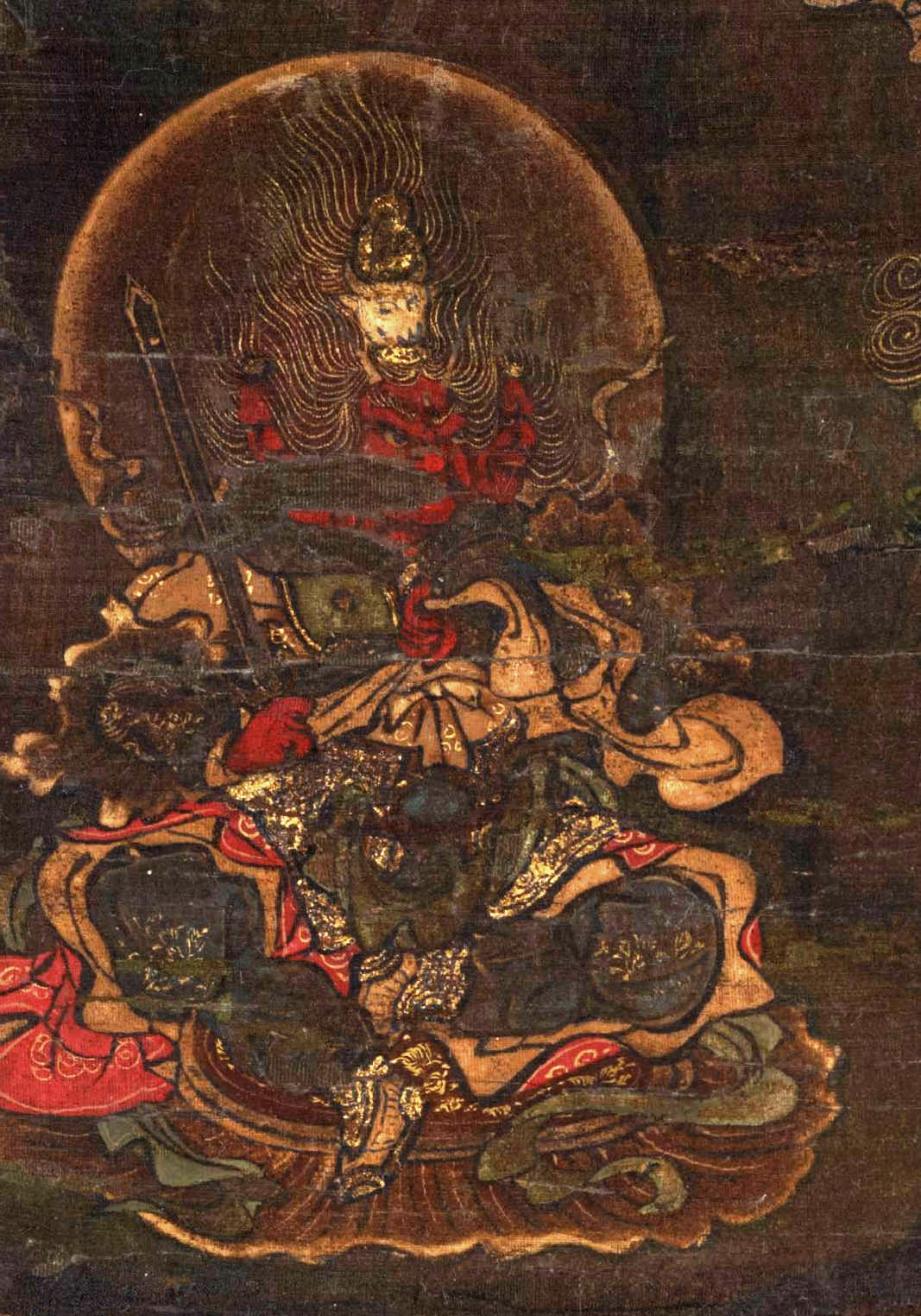
Nanboku-chō period depiction of Gozu Tennō with three heads

Gozu Tennō was usually portrayed as a fierce-looking man with the head of an ox above his head. He is sometimes shown wielding an axe in one hand and a noose or lasso in the other, though other depictions may instead show him brandishing a sword or a halberd. He may be clad either in Indian-style garments, a suit of armor, or (rarely) in Japanese (Heian period) clothing. Some artworks might depict the deity with multiple arms and heads: a late Heian period statue in Sakai, Osaka Prefecture for instance shows him with three faces and four arms. Another statue in Tsushima, Aichi Prefecture depicts him with twelve arms, four heads (two fierce human heads each with a single horn, a horse's head, and an ox's head), and bird talons for feet. An ink drawing on a wooden panel (dating from 1490) which portrays the god with five heads is preserved in a temple in Konan, Shiga Prefecture.

Several early modern depictions of Susanoo identify the deity as Gozu Tennō and may even exhibit iconographic traits of the latter (e.g. the ox's head) such as the first two images in this article.

== Consort and offspring ==
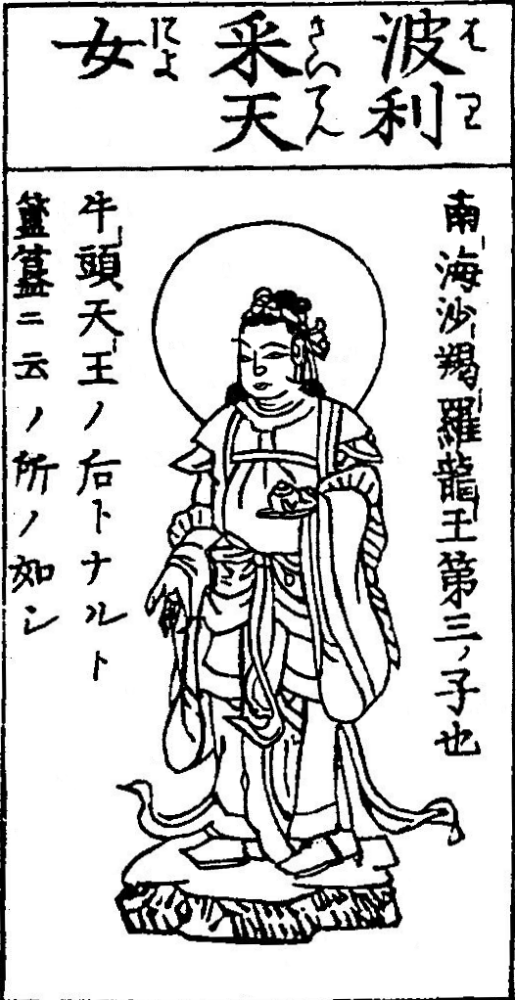
Harisai Tennyo, from the Butsuzōzui

The oldest version of the Somin Shōrai legend portrays the god Mutō as marrying the daughter of the god of the southern seas. In later forms of this story featuring Gozu Tennō, the princess is given the name Harisaijo (頗梨采女 or 波利采女, also known as 'Harisainyo' or 'Barisainyo') or 'Harisai Tennyo' (頗梨采天女) and is identified as the third daughter of the dragon (nāga) king Sāgara. As Gozu Tennō was amalgamated with Susanoo, Harisaijo was in turn identified with Susanoo's wife Kushinadahime. Harisaijo was also associated with the Onmyōdō goddess Toshitokujin (歳徳神), the presiding deity of the Japanese New Year.

Gozu Tennō is said to have had eight children with Harisaijo, collectively known as the Hachiōji (八王子; Eight Princes). These deities were amalgamated with both the Hasshōshin (八将神; Eight Divine Generals), the guardians of the eight cardinal direction in Onmyōdō, and eight of Susanoo's sons and daughters (Yashimajinumi, I(so)takeru, Ōya(tsu)hime, Tsumatsuhime, Ōtoshi, Ukanomitama, Ōyabiko, and Suseribime).

== Legacy ==
Hachiōji Castle, located in the city of Hachiōji (which gets its name from this castle) in western Tokyo, is named after Gozu Tennō's children. Legend states that a monk named Myōkō (妙行) had a vision of Gozu Tennō and the Hachiōji while meditating at the hill where the castle would later be built, Shiroyama (formerly also known as Fukazawayama), during the early 10th century.

== See also ==
- Amabie
- Gion cult
- Gion Matsuri
- Gomukha
- Minotaur
- Ox-Head and Horse-Face
- Shennong
- Yamantaka
- Yasaka Shrine
