= Mikogami (disambiguation) =

Mikogami is a child deity in the Shinto religion. It may also refer to:

== People ==
- Mikogami Tenzen, a Japanese samurai

== Anime, manga, and novels ==
- Hayato Mikogami in Sekirei manga
- Mikogami (Sky Girls), secondary characters in the Sky Girls anime
- Mikogami family in the Animal Detective Kiruminzoo anime
- Mushukunin Mikogami no Jokichi, a mystery by Saho Sasazawa
- Tsukasa Mikogami in High School Prodigies Have It Easy Even in Another World light novel
