= Tsushima Shrine =

Shinto shrine in Tsushima, Japan

Tsushima Shrine 津島神社
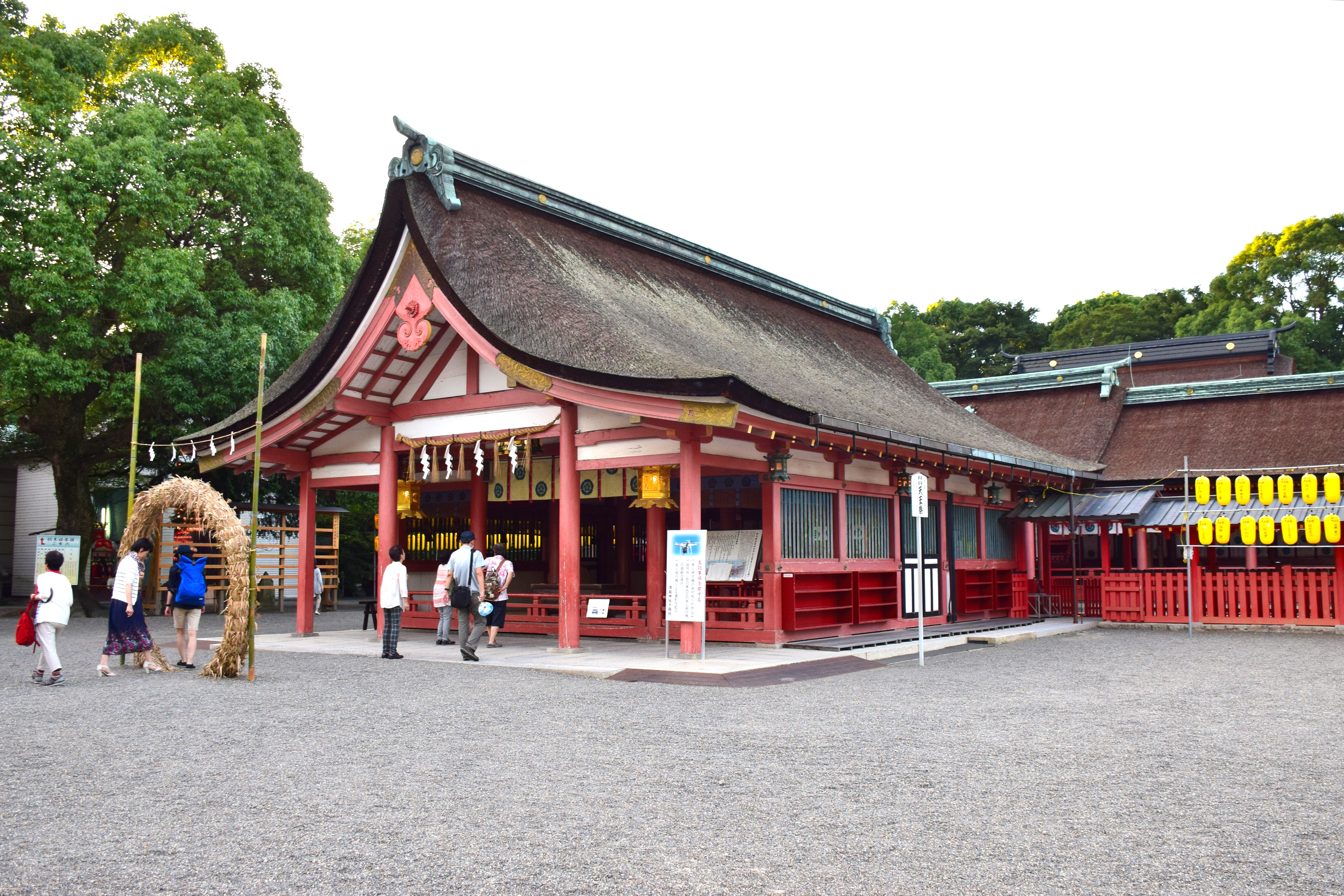
- The haiden of Tsushima Shrine

- Location within Aichi Prefecture Location within Japan

Religion
- Affiliation: Shinto
- Deity: Susanoo/Gozu Tennō
- Type: Tsushima Shrine

Location
- Location: Tsushima, Aichi
- Coordinates: 35°10′42″N 136°43′07″E

Architecture
- Style: owari-zukuri
- Established: 540 AD

Website
- tsushimajinja.or.jp

Tsushima Shrine (津島神社, Tsushima Jinja) is a Shinto shrine in Tsushima, Aichi Prefecture, Japan. It is the head shrine of a nationwide shrine network of shrines dedicated to the Tsushima Cult (津島信仰, Tsushima Shinkō). Centered primarily in the Tōkai region, this network has approximately 3,000 shrines and is the tenth largest network in the country. The main kami of this faith are Gozu Tennō (牛頭天王, lit. ox-headed heaven king), the god of pestilences, and Susanoo, two deities that have been conflated together. For this reason, like other shrines of the network, it is also called Tsushima Gozutennō-sha (津島牛頭天王社, lit. Tsushima Gozutennō Shrine). (See Gion cult for more information.)

== History ==
Shrine legend, unsupported by any historical documentation, claims that the shrine was founded in Tsushima by the semi-legendary Emperor Kōrei (343-215 BCE) to worship Gozutennō's aramitama (its violent side), which remained at Izumo-taisha, and it's nigemitama (calm aspect) which came to Japan from the Korean Peninsula after stopping in Tsushima Island, between Korea and Japan. The shrine relocated to its current location in Owari Province in 540 CE. This may explain the relationship between the two Tsushimas suggested by the common name. The shrine appears in historical records from the time of Emperor Saga (786-846 CE), during whose rank it was awarded the status of First Court Rank, indicating that it was of considerable importance and antiquity by that time. It was awarded the title of Tennō-sha by Emperor Ichijō (980-1011 CE); however, for unknown reasons, it is not mentioned at all in the Engishiki records completed in 927 CE, nor in the official records of the province. In the Sengoku period, the Oda clan built Shobata Castle in the vicinity of the shrine, and the family crest of the Oda clan is the same emblem as that used by the Tsushima Shrine, indicating a close connection. The shrine was subsequently repaired by Toyotomi Hideyoshi, and it received official status and patronage by the Owari Tokugawa clan of Owari Domain under the Tokugawa shogunate in the Edo period.

With the establishment of State Shinto in the Meiji period, Tsushima Shine was initially ranked as a prefectural shrine in Modern system of ranked Shinto shrines, and its status was increased to that of a kokuhei-shōsha (国幣小社), or National Shrine, 3rd rank, in 1926.

In 1920, the Honden of the shrine, which was built in 1605 under the patronage of Matsudaira Tadayoshi, was designated an Important Cultural Property. The building is built in the owari-zukuri style, of which few examples remain. The Rōmon gate, built in 1591, was also designated an Important Cultural Property in 1954.

== Festivals ==
The shrine holds a festival called Tsushima Matsuri (津島祭り) during the sixth month of the lunar calendar (July in the Gregorian calendar. During the festival, boats called danjiri (車楽) are floated on the Tennō River, and reeds are released into the water.

== Gallery ==
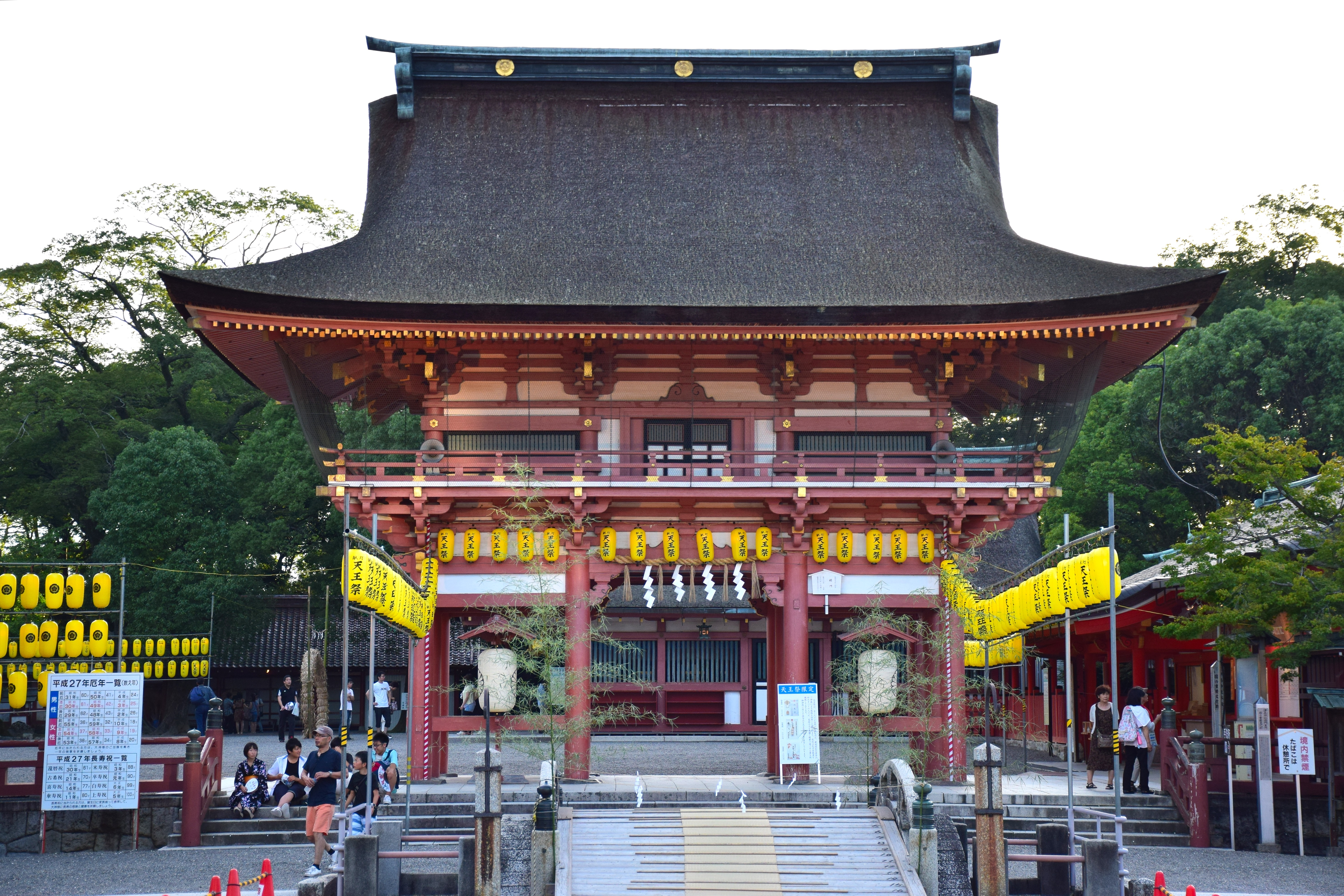
Rōmon

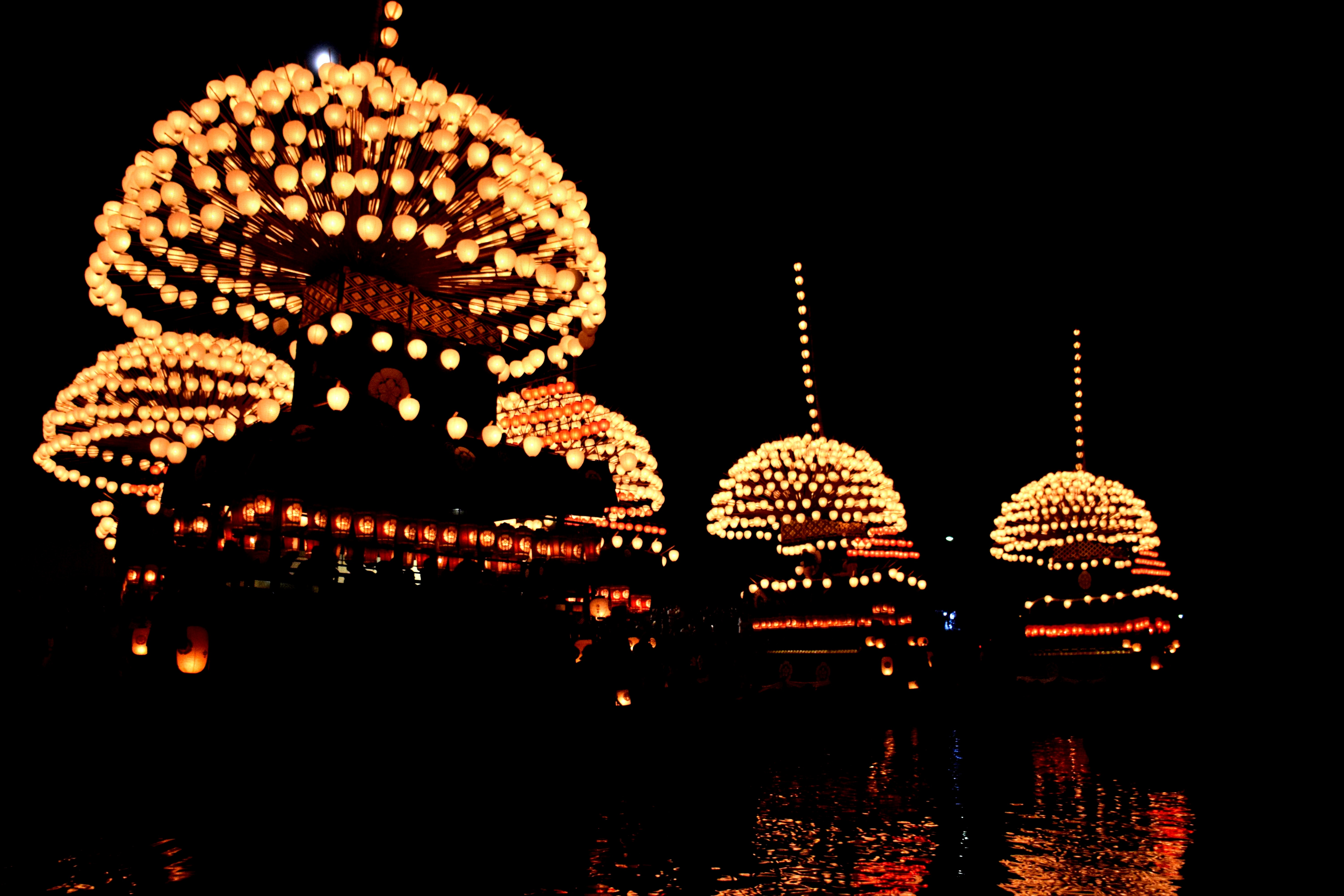
Owari Tsushima Tennōsai(eve)
