= Somin Shōrai =

Figure in Japanese folklore

In Japanese mythology and folklore, Somin Shōrai (蘇民将来, kyūjitai: 蘇民將來; also written as 蘓民將耒) was a poor man who gave food and shelter to a certain god in the guise of a traveler who was looking for a place to stay. As a reward, the god provided Somin Shōrai's family a means to save themselves from an oncoming pestilence that eventually claimed the lives of those who had turned him away earlier. The story of Somin Shōrai is the basis for the Shinto custom of walking through a large ring of twisted miscanthus reeds during the beginning of summer at many Shinto shrines across Japan. Talismans bearing Somin Shōrai's name are also popularly held to ward off disease and misfortune.

== Legend ==
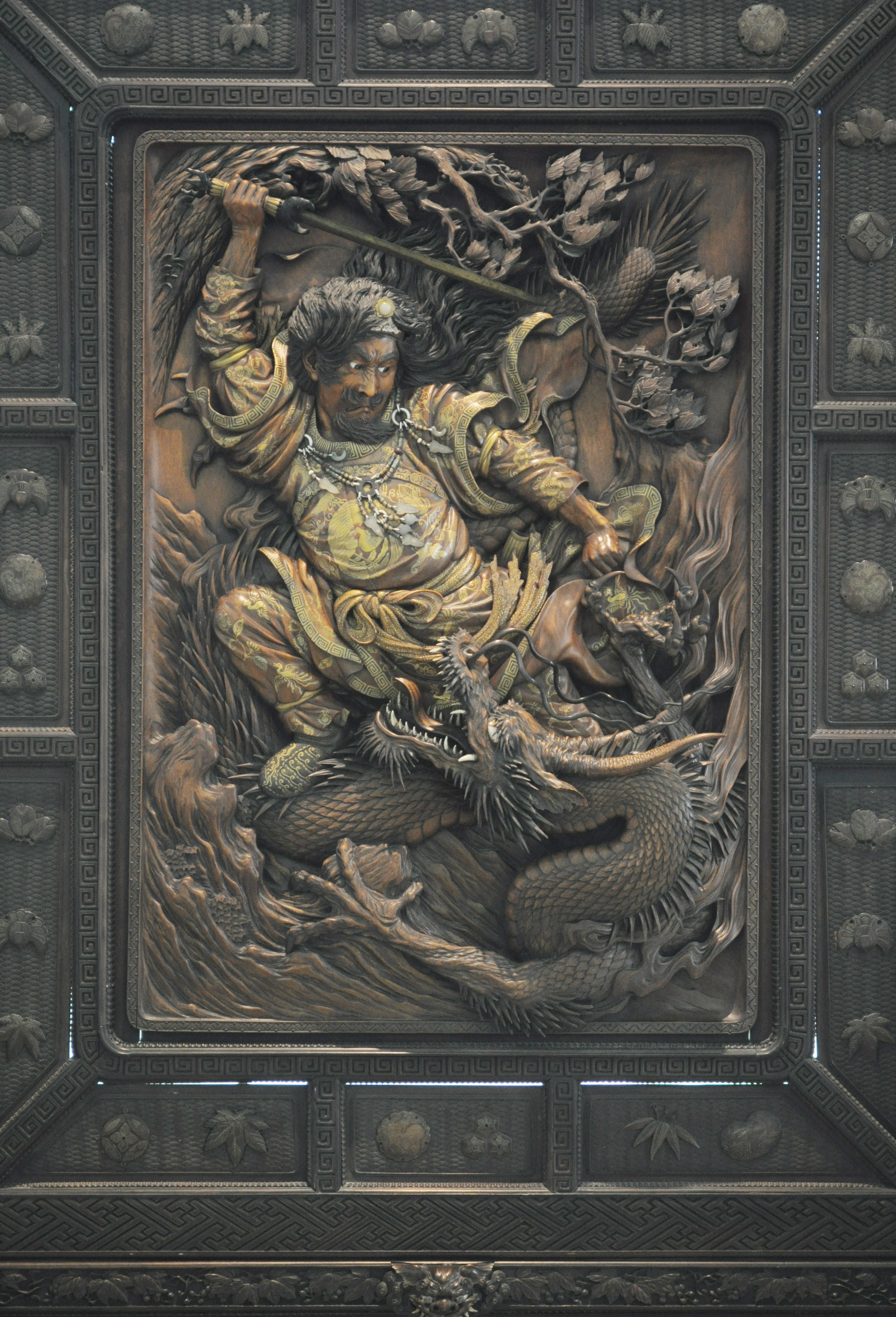
Mutō-no-Kami (武塔神) or Mutō Tenjin (武塔天神), the god who received hospitality from Somin Shōrai, is identified with Susanoo (pictured)

The earliest version of the Somin Shōrai legend is found in the imperially commissioned gazetteer (Fudoki) of Bingo Province (modern eastern Hiroshima Prefecture) compiled during the Nara period, surviving in an extract quoted by medieval scholar and Shinto priest Urabe Kanekata in the Shaku Nihongi.

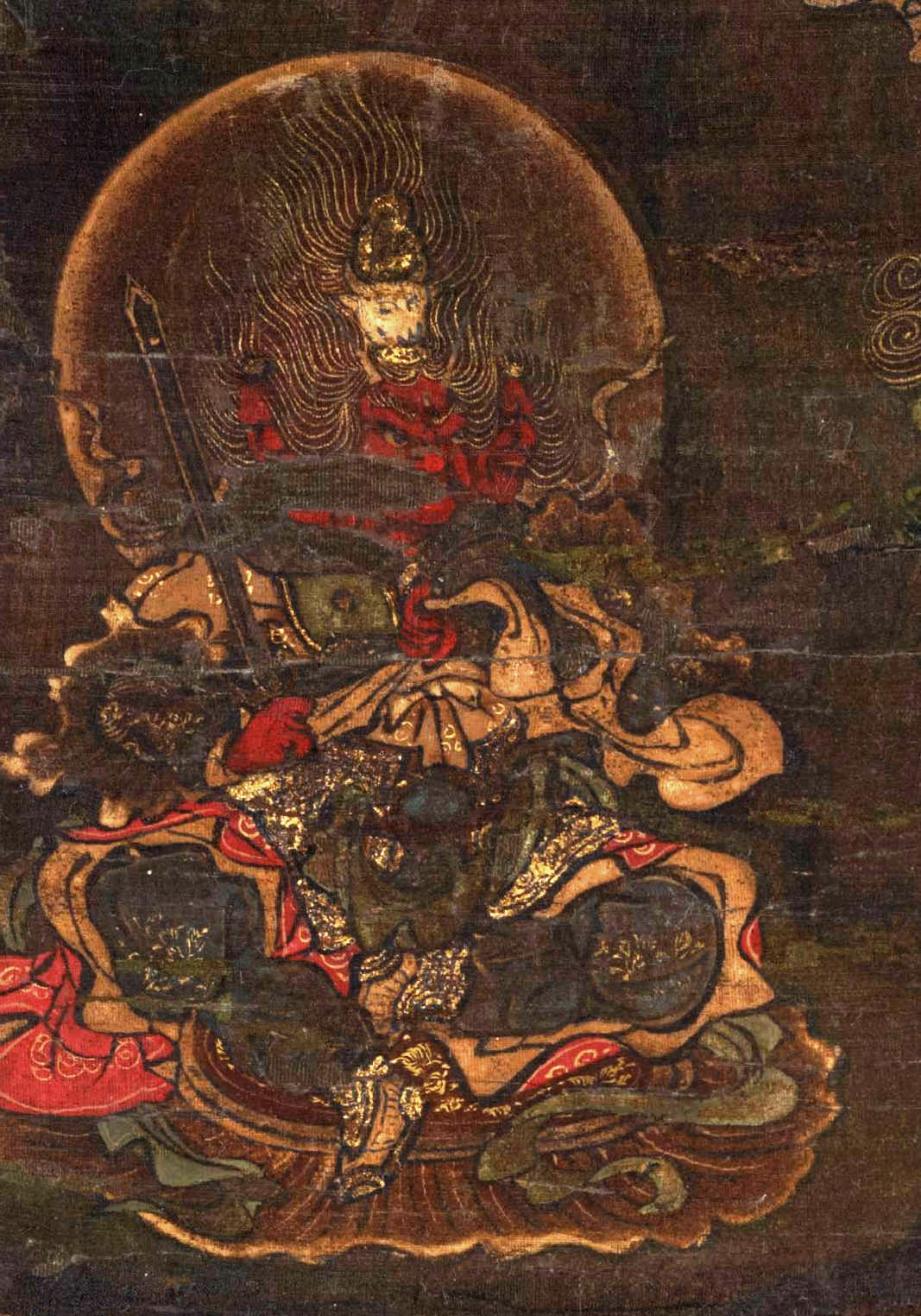
Gozu Tennō, a syncretic deity associated with plague and disease historically conflated with Susanoo and Mutō-no-Kami

According to the story, a god from the northern sea named, Mutō-no-Kami (武塔神), who was embarking on a long journey to court the daughter of his counterpart, the god of the southern sea, asked for a place to stay for the night from two brothers. While the wealthy, younger brother refused the deity any hospitality, the elder brother, named Somin Shōrai, though extremely poor, took him in as a guest and shared all that he had: a bed of millet-straw and a simple meal of cooked millet seeds. Years later, Mutō (who had since married the southern sea god's daughter and had eight children with her) returned to Somin Shōrai's old house and gave to Somin Shōrai's daughter a wreath of entwined miscanthus reeds (a Shimenawa wreath) as a reward for the hospitality shown to him by her late father, telling her to wear it around her waist from then-on. At that same night, the god exterminated all the inhabitants of the area, sparing only Somin Shōrai's daughter. Mutō then revealed himself to have actually been the god, Susanoo, and promised to her that, in the future, all those who would wear miscanthus wreaths around their waists while declaring themselves to be Somin Shōrai's descendants, in times of epidemics, would remain unharmed.

In some later versions of the legend, the rich younger brother is given the name Kotan Shōrai (巨旦将来), while the god who stayed in Somin Shōrai's house is identified, instead of Susanoo, as Gozu Tennō (牛頭天王 'Ox-Headed Heavenly King'), a pestilence deity conflated with both Mutō and Susanoo (though one version instead identifies Gozu Tennō as Mutō's son). In the version of the story found in the Hoki Naiden, an Onmyōdō text on divination attributed to Abe no Seimei, Kotan Shōrai (portrayed here as the king of an Indian kingdom), who was slain by Gozu Tennō as punishment for his lack of generosity, is identified with the evil deity, Konjin. In other variants, the divine traveller gives Somin Shōrai's family a talisman with the inscription "[I am] the descendant of Somin Shōrai" (蘇民将来之子孫也, Somin Shōrai no shison nari) as protection against pestilence.

== Chi-no-wa kuguri ==
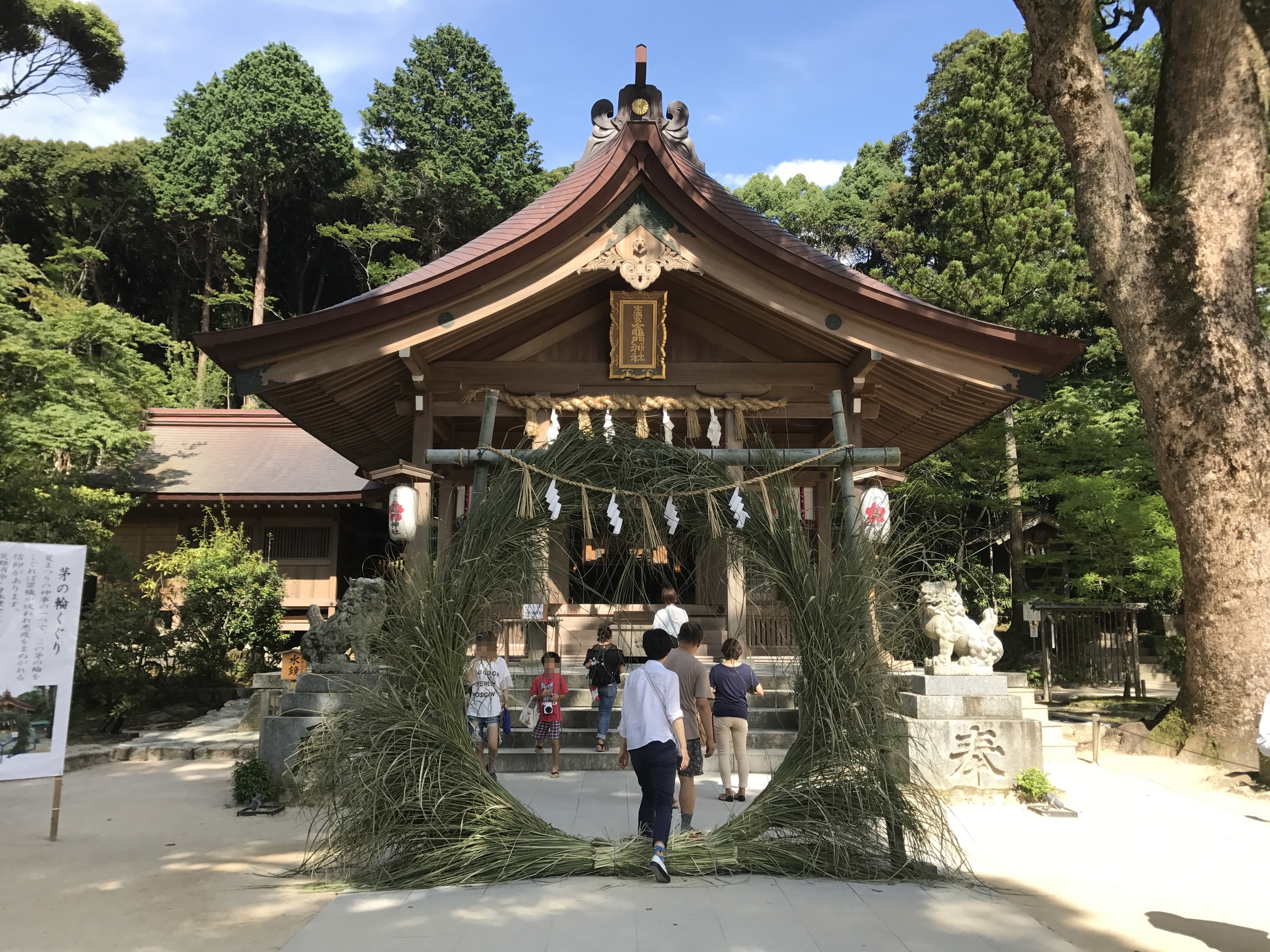
A chi-no-wa erected in front of a Shinto shrine

The legend forms the basis for the chi-no-wa kuguri (茅の輪くぐり) ritual performed in many Shinto shrines mainly during the annual Summer Purification Ritual (夏越の祓 Nagoshi no Harae or 夏越の大祓 Nagoshi no Ōharae) held at the end of June. This rite involves passing through a large miscanthus hoop (茅の輪 chi-no-wa) set up at the shrine's entrance or within its precincts, usually while reciting one or more seasonal waka such as the one below followed by a double recitation of Somin Shōrai's name. Walking through this ring is believed to cleanse sins and other defilements (kegare) and guard against misfortune.

水無月の (Minazuki no)
夏越の祓 (Nagoshi no harae)
する人は (suru hito wa)
千歳の命 (chitose no inochi)
延ぶといふなり (nobu to iu nari)

—Anonymous, Shūi Wakashū

In Minazuki,
at the passing of summer,
those who purify themselves
are said to have a thousand years
added to their lifespan.

== Worship ==
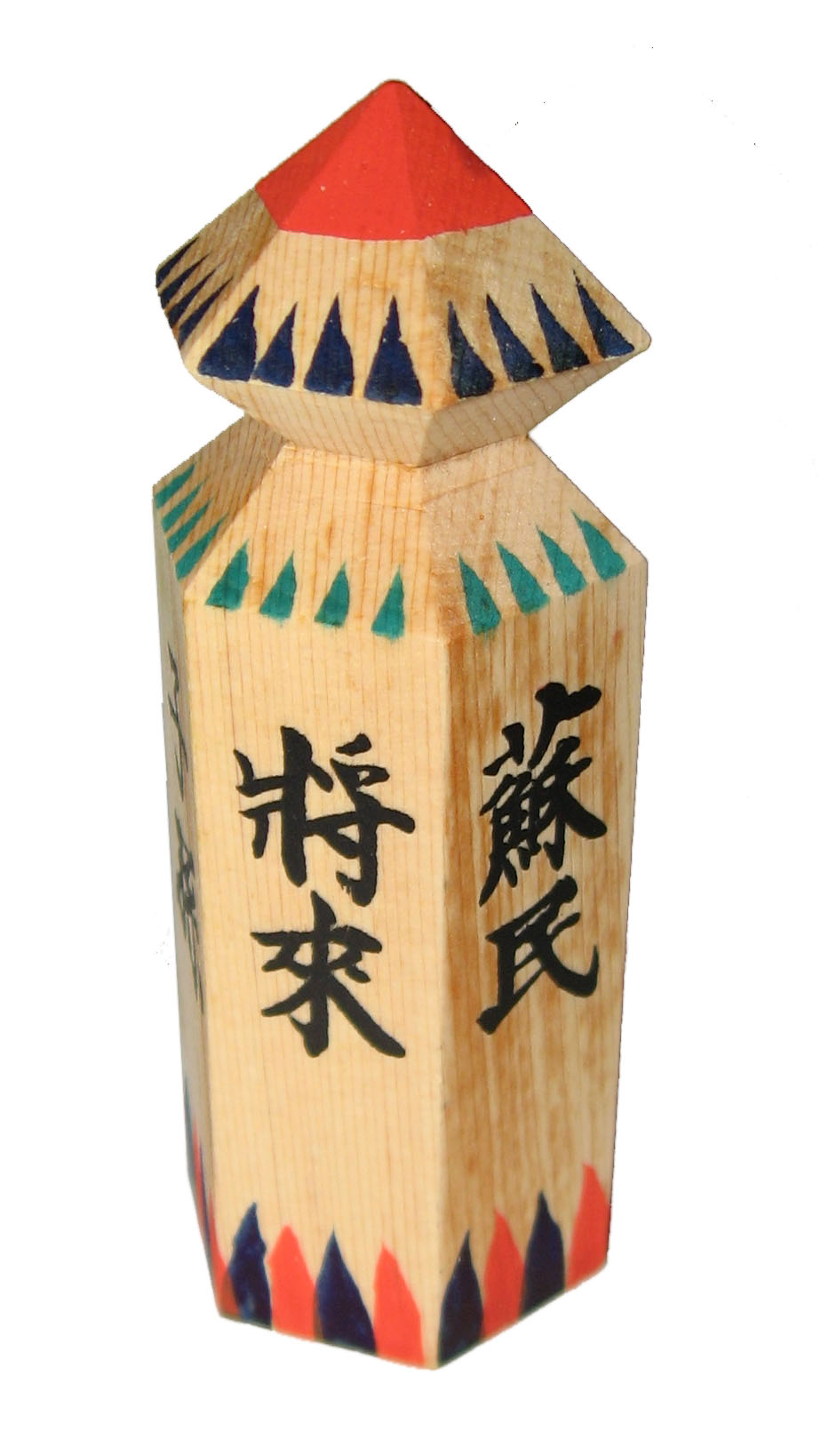
Wooden charm with Somin Shōrai's name

Somin Shōrai is venerated in a few shrines as a deity against disease, such as in Eki Shrine (疫神社 Eki-jinja, lit. 'Plague Shrine'), an auxiliary shrine within the precincts of Yasaka Shrine in the Gion District of Kyoto.

The story is also the inspiration for the Somin Festival (蘇民祭 Somin-sai) held in various places within Iwate Prefecture, the most famous of which being the one held every February at Kokuseki-ji Temple in Ōshū City. In this festival, hundreds of half-naked men compete to grab the 'Somin bag' (蘇民袋 Somin-bukuro), which is said to bring good fortune.

== Amulets ==
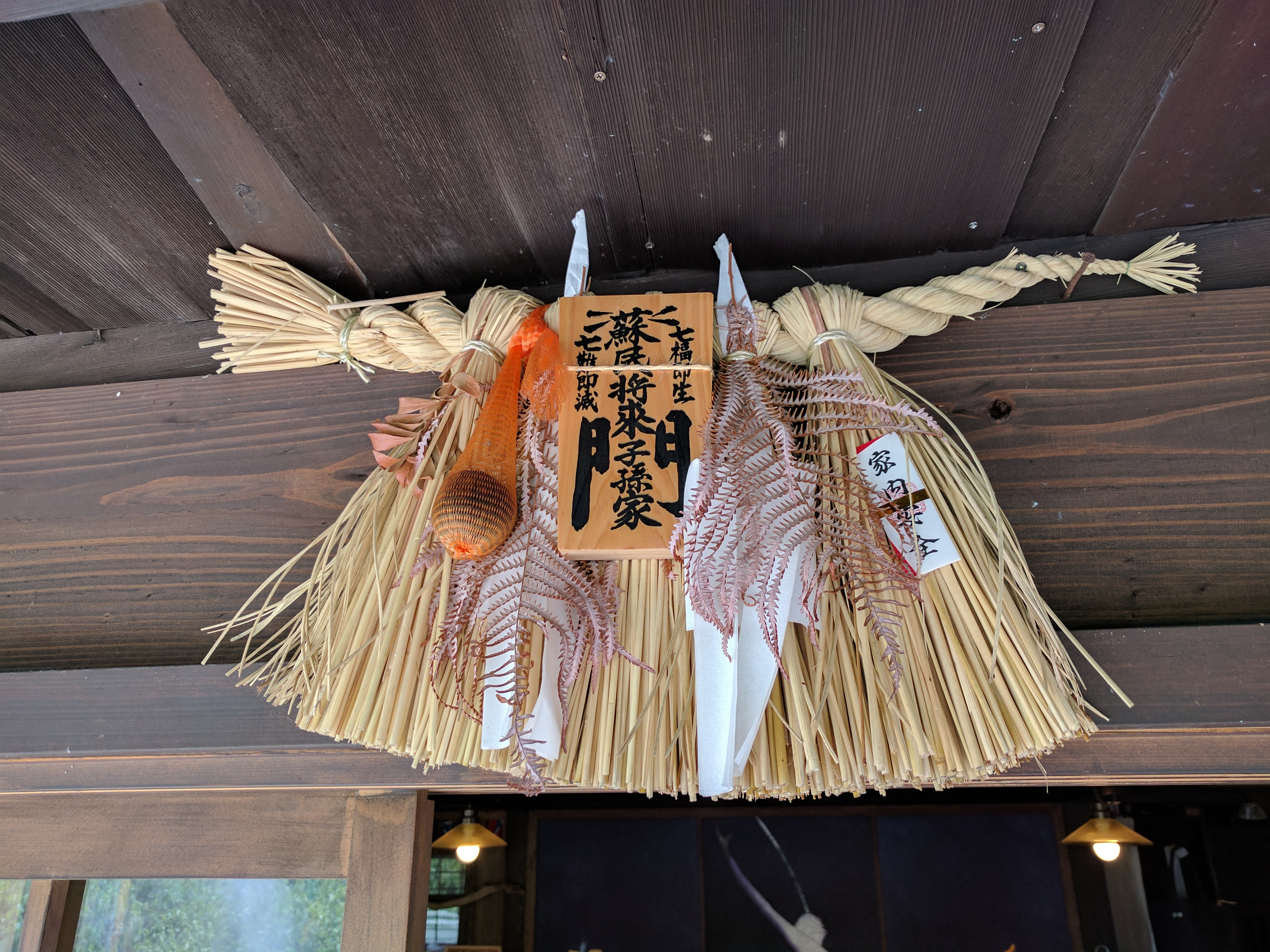
A shimenawa above a doorway with a plaque bearing the inscription "The house of Somin Shōrai's descendants" (蘇民将来子孫家門, Somin Shōrai shison kamon)

Various types of amulets (omamori) bearing Somin Shōrai's name is distributed by a number of Shinto shrines and Buddhist temples across Japan.

In Kyoto, a talisman resembling a chimaki (a rice dumpling wrapped in bamboo leaves) on which is attached a slip of paper with the words "The descendant(s) of Somin Shōrai" (蘇民将来之子孫也, Somin Shōrai no shison nari) is traditionally hung on doorways to ward off misfortune. A similar custom, involving a shimenawa with a wooden plaque on which is written "The house of Somin Shōrai's descendants" (蘇民将来子孫家門, Somin Shōrai shison kamon), is practiced in the Ise and Shima areas of Mie Prefecture.

In Ueda, Nagano Prefecture, hexagonal wooden charms inscribed with the words "Wealthy [and] prosperous [are] Somin Shōrai's descendant(s)" (大福長者蘇民将来子孫人也, Daifuku chōja Somin Shōrai shison no hito nari) traditionally handmade by members of the local Somin Confraternity (蘇民講 Somin-kō) are distributed by Shinano Kokubun-ji temple during the Yōkadō Festival (八日堂縁日 Yōkadō Ennichi) held every 7th-8 January.

== See also ==
- Baucis and Philemon
- Folk medicine
- Harae
- Omamori
- Shimenawa
- Sodom and Gomorrah
- Susanoo
- Theoxenia
