= Mikogami =

Child deity in Shinto

In Shinto, a mikogami (御子神 (honorable-child-kami)) is a term used within the context of parent-child deity cults to refer to an offspring kami. A mikogami is also referred to as a byōeishin. The parent deity of a mikogami can be either a father (hikogami) or a mother deity (himegami), with the latter fitting into the framework of cults devoted to "mother-child deities"(boshijin').

The concept of a mikogami is illustrated in the fragmentary Tsukushi-no kuni fudoki, which describes a three-peaked mountain called Kishimayama. The southwestern peak is named hikogami, the middle peak is the himegami, and the northeastern peak is the mikogami (offspring-kami).

Mikogami is a "subordinate" deity (眷族 (kenzoku)).

== Wakamiya ==
A mikogami often is enshrined in an affiliated shrine, known as wakamiya. While most of these are dedicated to the offspring of the central deity (waka means "young"), some may enshrine a parent or ancestral deity. Furthermore, some wakamiya serve as temporary sites (anzaisho or karimiya) for the main deity during festivals. Therefore, the shrine being a wakamiya does not necessarily imply the enshrinement of a mikogami.

== Boshijin ==
Term boshijin is used in case a joint shrine is dedicated to mother goddess (boshin) and her mikogami.

== Examples of enshrinement ==
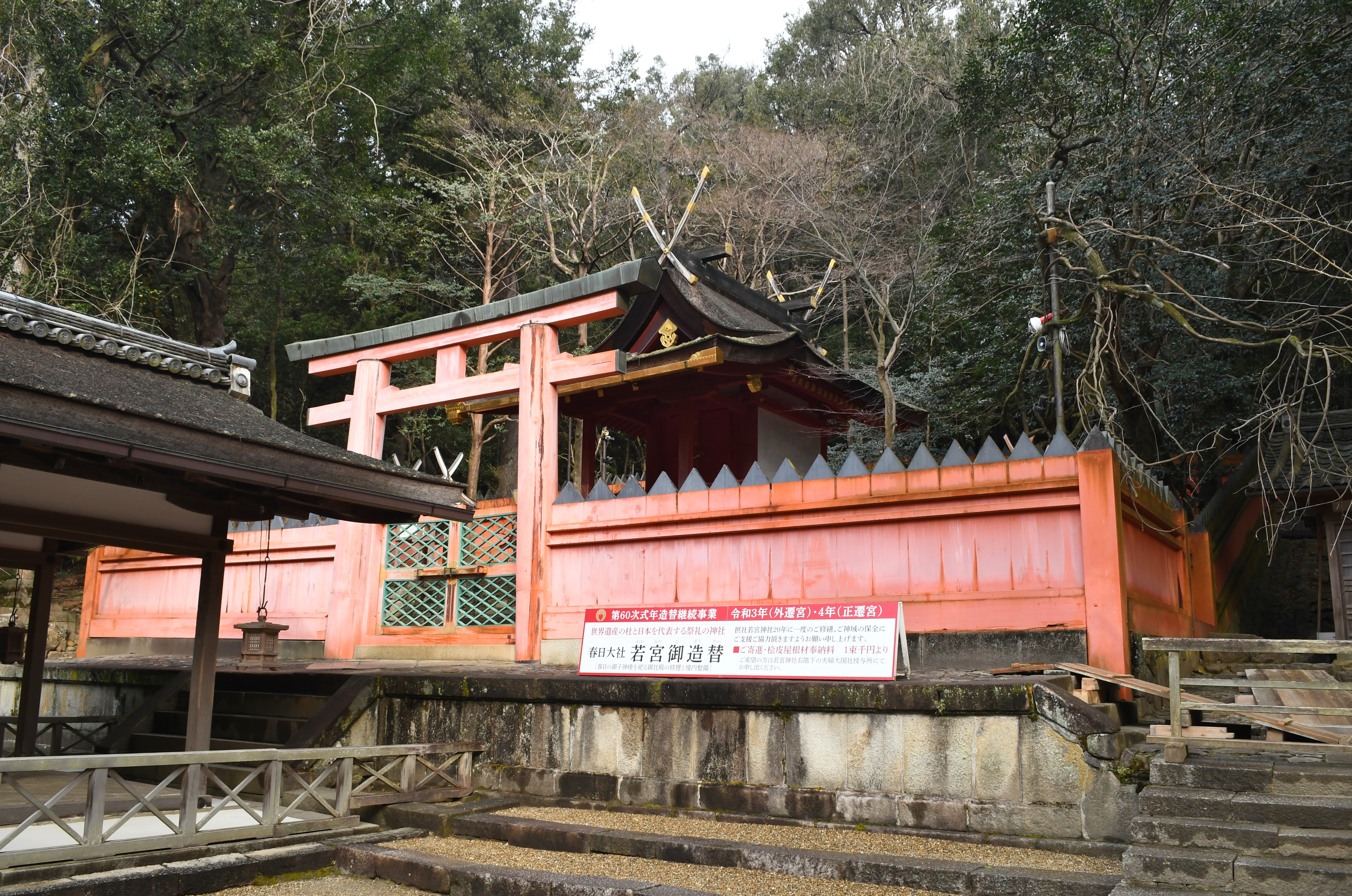
Wakamiya Jinja at Kasuga-taisha

Specific instances of mikogami enshrinement can be found at several prominent shrines in Japan:

- Yasaka Shrine: The main hall is dedicated to Susanoo as the chief kami, with his consort Kushinadahime on the east. To the west, eight offspring deities, known as the yahashira no mikogami (eight pillar mikogami), are enshrined. These include Yashimajinumi no kami, Itakeru no kami, Ōyatsuhime and Tsumatsuhime no kami, Ōtoshi no kami, Ukanomitama no kami, Ōyatsuhiko no kami, and Suseribime no mikoto.
- Dazaifu Tenmangū: Within the shrine precincts, there is an associate shrine (sessha) dedicated to Sugawara Takachika and Sugawara Kageyuki, who are the offspring of the principal deity of Dazaifu Tenmangū, Sugawara no Michizane.
- Kasuga-taisha: This is the clan shrine (ujigami) of the Fujiwara clan, and one of the deities worshipped is Ame-no-Koyane, the ancestral kami (sojin) of the Nakatomi clan. An affiliated shrine, Wakamiya Jinja, enshrines Ame-no-Oshikumone, the divine offspring of Ame-no-Koyane. The establishment of the wakamiya shrine at Kasuga in 1135 was also closely related to the belief in goryō (vengeful spirits of the high-ranking dead), which was popular in the late Heian period.

Boshijin can be found in Kamo shrines and Hachiman beliefs. In the latter case, Hachiman shrines enshrine both Emperor Ōjin and his mother, Empress Jingū.

== See also ==
- Miko, a Shinto shrine maiden
