= Gion cult =

Cult of Gozu Tenno and Susanoo

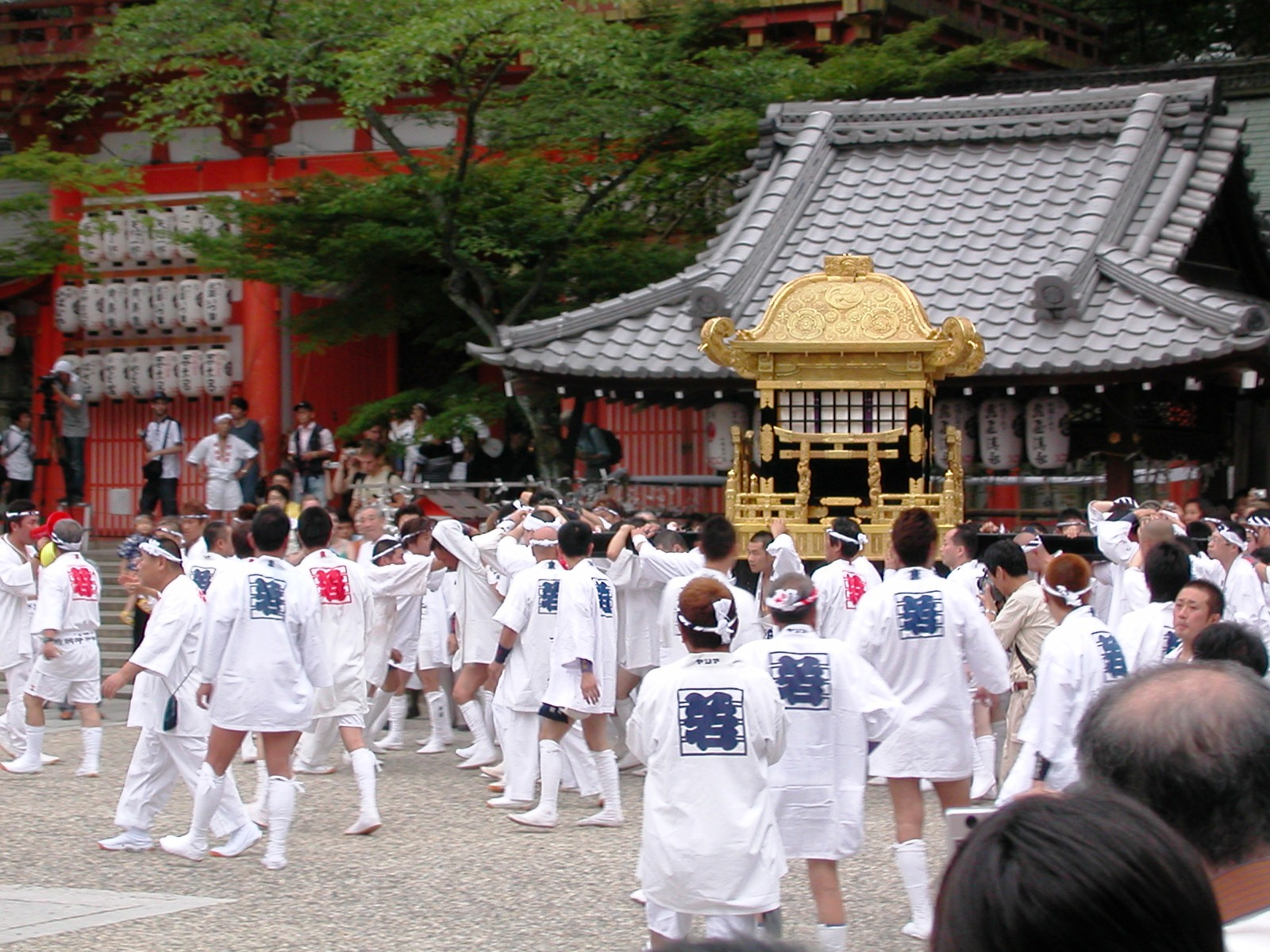
Yasaka shrine during the Gion festival, the largest shrine and festival of the Gion faith

Gion worship (祇園信仰, Gion shinkō) is a Shinto cult. Originally it revolved solely around Gozu Tenno, but during the Separation of Shinto and Buddhism of the Meiji era the government mandated it shift to revolving around Susanoo.

The main shrines are Yasaka Shrine in Kyoto, Hiromine Shrine in Hyogo Prefecture, and Tsushima Shrine in Aichi Prefecture

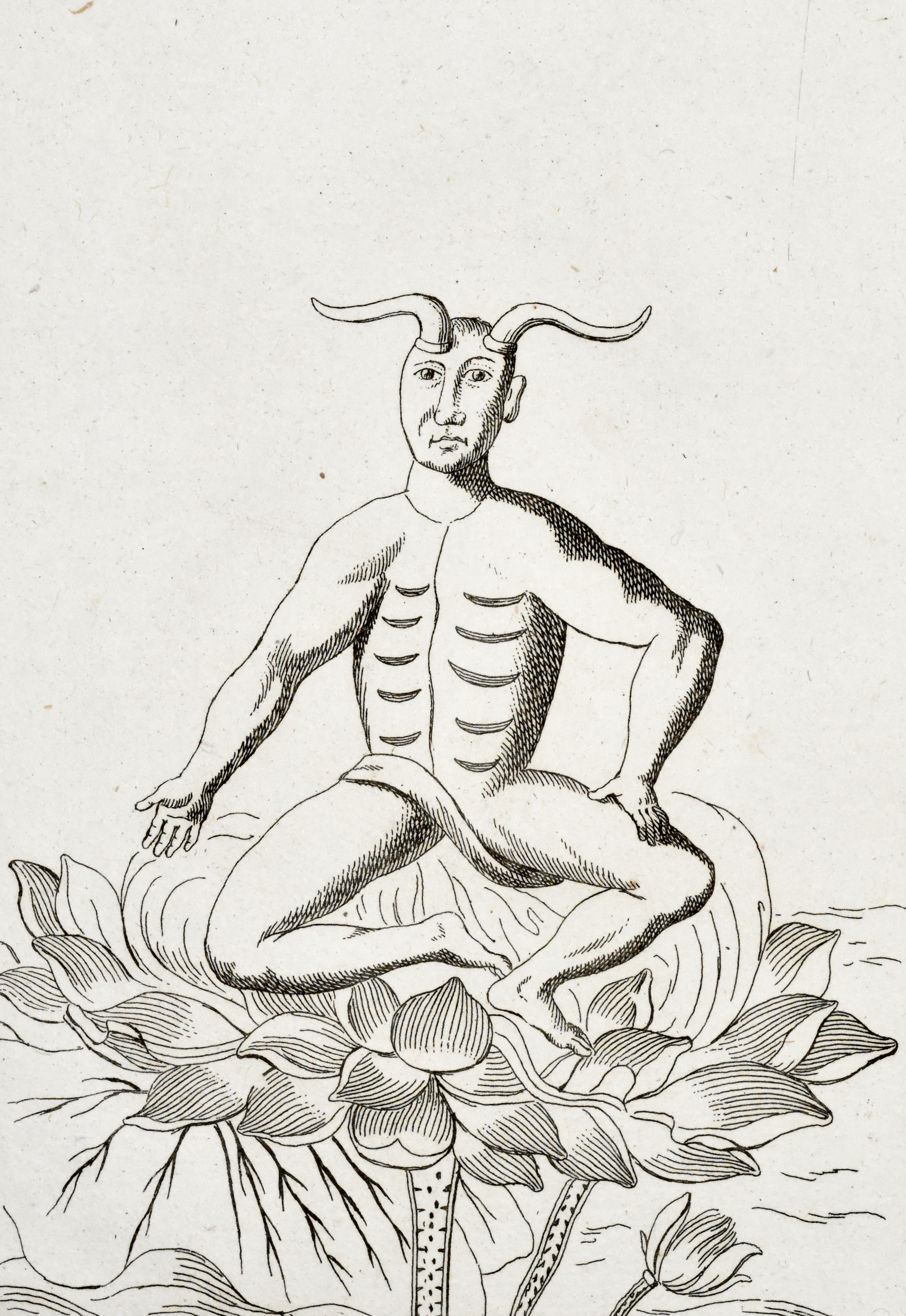
A copperplate engraving of Japanese deity "Giwon" by Bernard Picart, circa 1728

There are many other cults of Susanoo that are not derived from the Gion faith, but rather from indigenous Shinto traditions without Buddhist influence. These include Susa Shrine, and Yaegaki Shrine.

== History ==
Gozu Tenno was originally a Buddhist-style Onmyōdō deity, and is generally considered to be the guardian deity of Jetavana, the monastery where the Buddha studied.

According to legend, from the 6th to 7th centuries CE, Hōdō traveled from India through China and the Korean kingdom of Baekje and eventually arrived in Japan. He is recognized as the founder of temples in the mountains of Harima Province and is associated with several chokugan-ji (勅願寺), Buddhist temples built at the request of the reigning emperor.

Tradition holds that when Hōdō came to Japan, he was accompanied by the deity Gozu Tennō (牛頭天王; Sanskrit: Gośīrṣa devarāja), who was later enshrined at Hiromine Shrine and Yasaka Shrine and is venerated in the Gion faith.

While engaged in ascetic practice on Mount Rokkō at the Kumoga Iwa Rock (雲ヶ岩), Hōdō is said to have been approached by the deity Vaiśravaṇa riding on purple clouds. It was after this encounter that Hōdō built Tamon-ji in Hyōgo Prefecture to enshrine the Kumoga Iwa Rock, Rokkō-Hime-Daizen-no-Kami (六甲比命大善神), and the Shinkyō Iwa Rock.

The description in Shinnaiden is prominent. In China, he was influenced by Taoism, and in Japan, he further merged with Susanoo, the Kami of Shinto. This is because both Gozu Tenno and Susanoo were considered to be plague gods. He was considered to be the Buddha Bhaisajyaguru.

The cult began in the Heian period, and the original form of the Gion faith was to prevent epidemics by comforting the god of pestilence. In the late 10th century, the citizens of Kyoto began to hold a festival at Yasaka Shrine (then known as Gion Shrine) which became known as Gion Matsuri. By the Middle Ages, the Gion faith had spread throughout the country, and Gion shrines or Gyototenno shrines were created to enshrine Gyotenno, and the Goryokai (or Tenno Festival) was held as a ritual procession.

In the Meiji era (1868–1912), the Separation of Buddhism and Shinto banned Buddhist rituals at shrines and prohibited the use of Buddhist words such as "Gozu Tenno" and "Gion" in the names of deities and company names, so Gion Shrine and Gozu Tenno Shrine became shrines dedicated to Susanoo and changed their names.

== Hiromine Gion cult ==
At Hiromine Shrine there is a quite different Gion cult revolving around agriculture rather than protection from disease. Interestingly Susanoo/Gozu Tenno is often observed as more intimidating in this tradition taking on elements of a jinushigami.

== Gion shrines ==
There are many Gion shrines, Yasaka Shrine being the most prominent. Others include:

- Hiromine Shrine (広峰神社) in Himeji, Hyōgo Prefecture, which has a very different Gion cult focused on agriculture
- Nanba Shrine in Osaka City
- Tsushima Shrine (津島神社) in Tsushima, Aichi Prefecture – Head shrine of the Tsushima shrine network
- Yasaka Shrine (八坂神社) in Gion, Higashiyama, Kyoto, Kyoto Prefecture – Head shrine of the Yasaka shrine network
