= Kushinadahime =

Shinto goddess, wife of Susanoo

- Goddess of rice, agriculture, marriage, love, childbirth, and child rearing
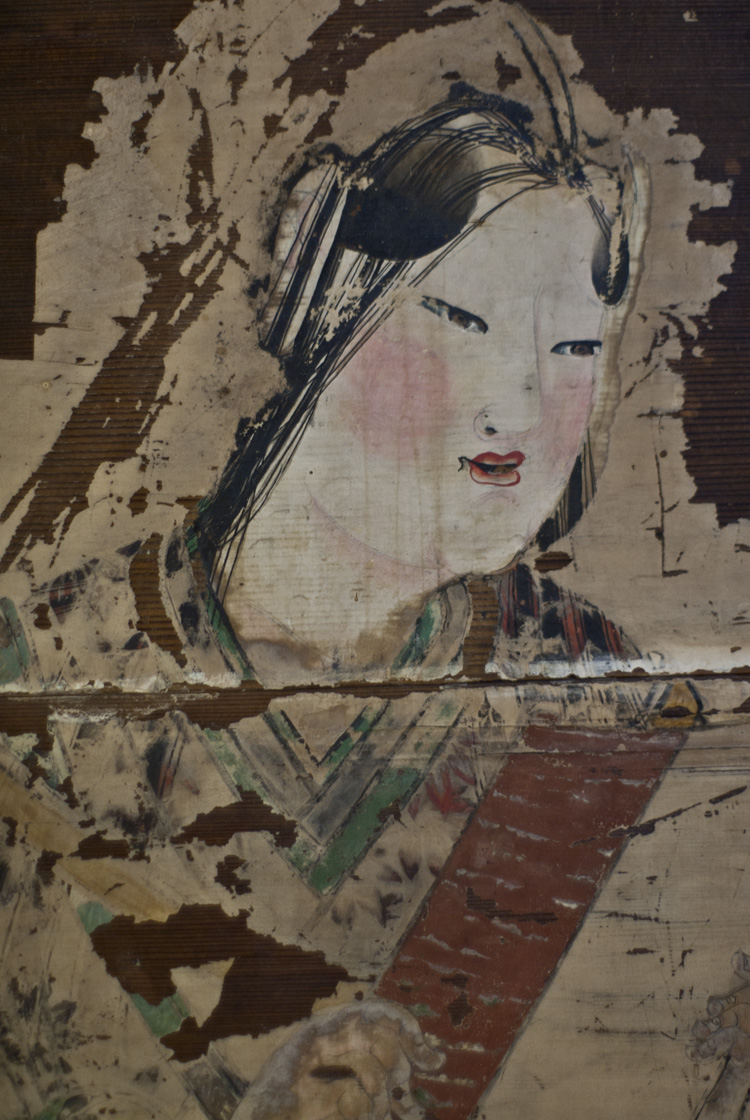
- Other names: Kushiinadahime (奇稲田姫); Inadahime (稲田媛); Makamifuru-Kushiinadahime (真髪触奇稲田媛); Kushiinada-Mitoyomanurahime-no-Mikoto (久志伊奈太美等与麻奴良比売命)
- Japanese: 櫛名田比売
- Major cult center: Susa Shrine, Yaegaki Shrine, Suga Shrine, Hikawa Shrine, Yasaka Shrine, Hiromine Shrine, Kushida Shrine (Saga), Kushida Shrine (Toyama) and others
- Texts: Kojiki; Nihon Shoki; Izumo Fudoki; Sendai Kuji Hongi

Genealogy
- Parents: Ashimazuchi and Temazuchi
- Siblings: Unnamed seven sisters
- Consort: Susanoo
- Children: Yashimajinumi (Kojiki); Ōnamuchi (Nihon Shoki)

Kushinadahime (櫛名田比売、くしなだひめ), also known as Kushiinadahime (奇稲田姫、くしいなだひめ) or Inadahime (稲田姫、いなだひめ) among other names, is a goddess (kami) in Japanese mythology and the Shinto faith. According to these traditions, she is one of the wives of the god Susanoo, who rescued her from the monster Yamata no Orochi. As Susanoo's wife, she is a central deity of the Gion cult and worshipped at Yasaka Shrine.

== Name ==
The goddess is named 'Kushinadahime' (櫛名田比売) in the Kojiki, while the Nihon Shoki variously names her 'Kushiinadahime' (奇稲田姫), 'Inadahime' (稲田姫), and 'Makamifuru-Kushiinadahime' (真髪触奇稲田媛).

'Inadahime' may be translated either as "lady / princess (hime) of Inada", with "Inada" (稲田) here being understood as the name of a place in Izumo Province (part of what is now the town of Okuizumo (formerly Yokota) in Nita District, Shimane Prefecture), or "lady / princess of the rice fields" (inada literally translated means "rice field" or "rice paddy"). The element kushi (Old Japanese: kusi) meanwhile is usually interpreted as the adjective meaning "wondrous"; it is homophonous with the word for "comb" (櫛), which features in her story in both the Kojiki and the Shoki. The epithet makamifuru (lit. "true-hair-touching"), found in a variant account cited in the Shoki, is understood as a stock epithet or makurakotoba associated with the word "comb".

The Fudoki of Izumo Province meanwhile gives the name of the goddess as 久志伊奈太美等与麻奴良比売命, commonly read as 'Kushiinada-Mitoyomanurahime-no-Mikoto'. One theory interprets the name to mean roughly "princess of the wondrous rice fields (kushi-inada) soaking wet (manura) [and] overflowing with water (mitoyo, here understood as an epithet meaning "water-abundant")".

== Mythology ==
=== The slaying of the Yamata no Orochi ===
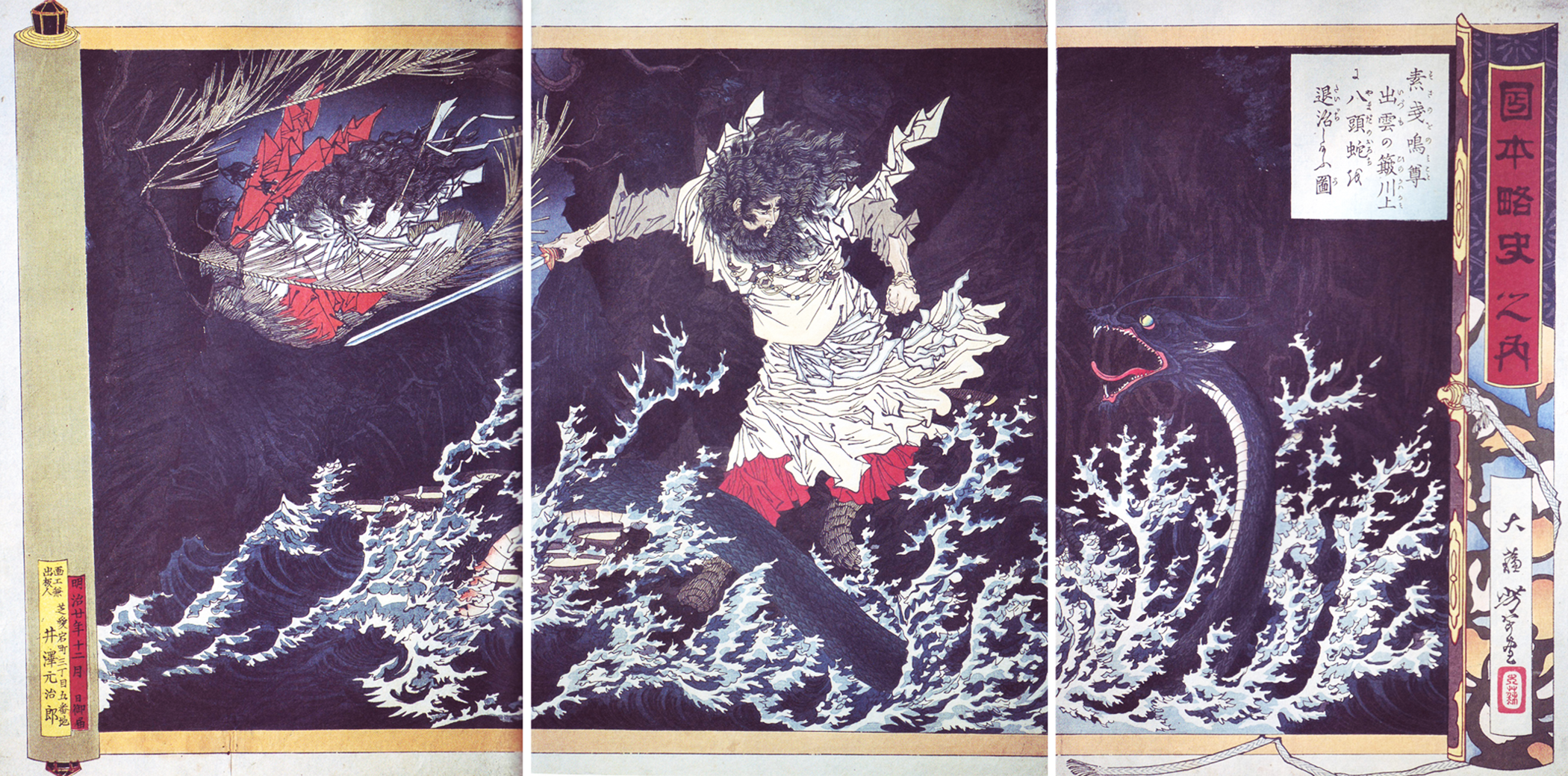
Susanoo and the Yamata no Orochi, by Yoshitoshi

In the Kojiki and the Nihon Shoki, the god Susanoo, after his banishment from the heavenly realm Takamagahara, came down to earth, to the land of Izumo, where he encountered an elderly couple named Ashinazuchi and Tenazuchi, both children of the mountain god Ōyamatsumi. They told him of a monstrous creature from the nearby land of Koshi known as the Yamata no Orochi ("eight-forked serpent") that had devoured seven of their eight daughters. Upon hearing this, Susanoo agreed to kill the serpent on condition that they give him their sole surviving daughter, Kushinadahime, to be his wife.

The version recounted in the Nihon Shoki's main narrative is as follows (translation by William George Aston):

Then Sosa no wo no Mikoto descended from Heaven and proceeded to the head-waters of the River Hi, in the province of Idzumo. At this time he heard a sound of weeping at the head-waters of the river, and he therefore went in search of the sound. He found there an old man and an old woman. Between them was set a young girl, whom they were caressing and lamenting over. Sosa no wo no Mikoto asked them, saying:—"Who are ye, and why do ye lament thus?" The answer was:—"I am an Earthly Deity, and my name is Ashi-nadzuchi. My wife's name is Te-nadzuchi. This girl is our daughter, and her name is Kushi-nada-hime. The reason of our weeping is that formerly we had eight children, daughters. But they have been devoured year after year by an eight-forked serpent, and now the time approaches for this girl to be devoured. There is no means of escape for her, and therefore do we grieve." Sosa no wo no Mikoto said:—"If that is so, wilt thou give me thy daughter?" He replied, and said:—"I will comply with thy behest and give her to thee." Therefore Sosa no wo no Mikoto on the spot changed Kushi-nada-hime into a many-toothed close-comb, which he stuck in the august knot of his hair. Then he made Ashi-nadzuchi and Te-nadzuchi to brew eight-fold sake, to make eight cupboards, in each of them to set a tub filled with sake, and so to await its coming. When the time came, the serpent actually appeared. It had an eight-forked head and an eight-forked tail; its eyes were red, like the winter-cherry; and on its back firs and cypresses were growing. As it crawled it extended over a space of eight hills and eight valleys. Now when it came and found the sake, each head drank up one tub, and it became drunken and fell asleep. Then Sosa no wo no Mikoto drew the ten-span sword which he wore, and chopped the serpent into small pieces. When he came to the tail, the edge of his sword was slightly notched, and he therefore split open the tail and examined it. In the inside there was a sword. This is the sword which is called Kusa-nagi no tsurugi.

After defeating the serpent, Susanoo built a palace or shrine for Kushinadahime in a place called Suga - so named because Susanoo felt refreshed (sugasugashi) upon arriving there - and made her father Ashinazuchi its head (obito), giving him the title 'Inada-no-Miyanushi-Suga-no-Yatsumimi-no-Kami' (稲田宮主須賀之八耳神 "Master of the Palace of Inada, the Eight-Eared Deity of Suga"). On that occasion, he composed a song in tanka form later held to be the root of Japanese waka poetry:

Man'yōgana (Kojiki)	Japanese	Old Japanese	Modern Japanese (Rōmaji)	Translated by Edwin Cranston
夜久毛多都 伊豆毛夜幣賀岐 都麻碁微爾 夜幣賀岐都久流 曾能夜幣賀岐袁	八雲立つ 出雲八重垣 妻籠みに 八重垣作る その八重垣を	Yakumo_{1} tatu Idumo_{1} yape_{1}gaki_{1} tumago_{2}mi_{2} ni yape_{1}gaki_{1} tukuru so_{2}no_{2} yape_{1}gaki_{1} wo	Yakumo tatsu Izumo yaegaki tsumagomi ni yaegaki tsukuru sono yaegaki o	In eight-cloud-rising Izumo an eightfold fence To enclose my wife An eightfold fence I build, And, oh, that eightfold fence!

The child born to Susanoo and Kushinadahime is variously identified as Yashimajinumi in the Kojiki and Ōnamuchi (Ōkuninushi) in the Shoki's main account.

==== Variants ====
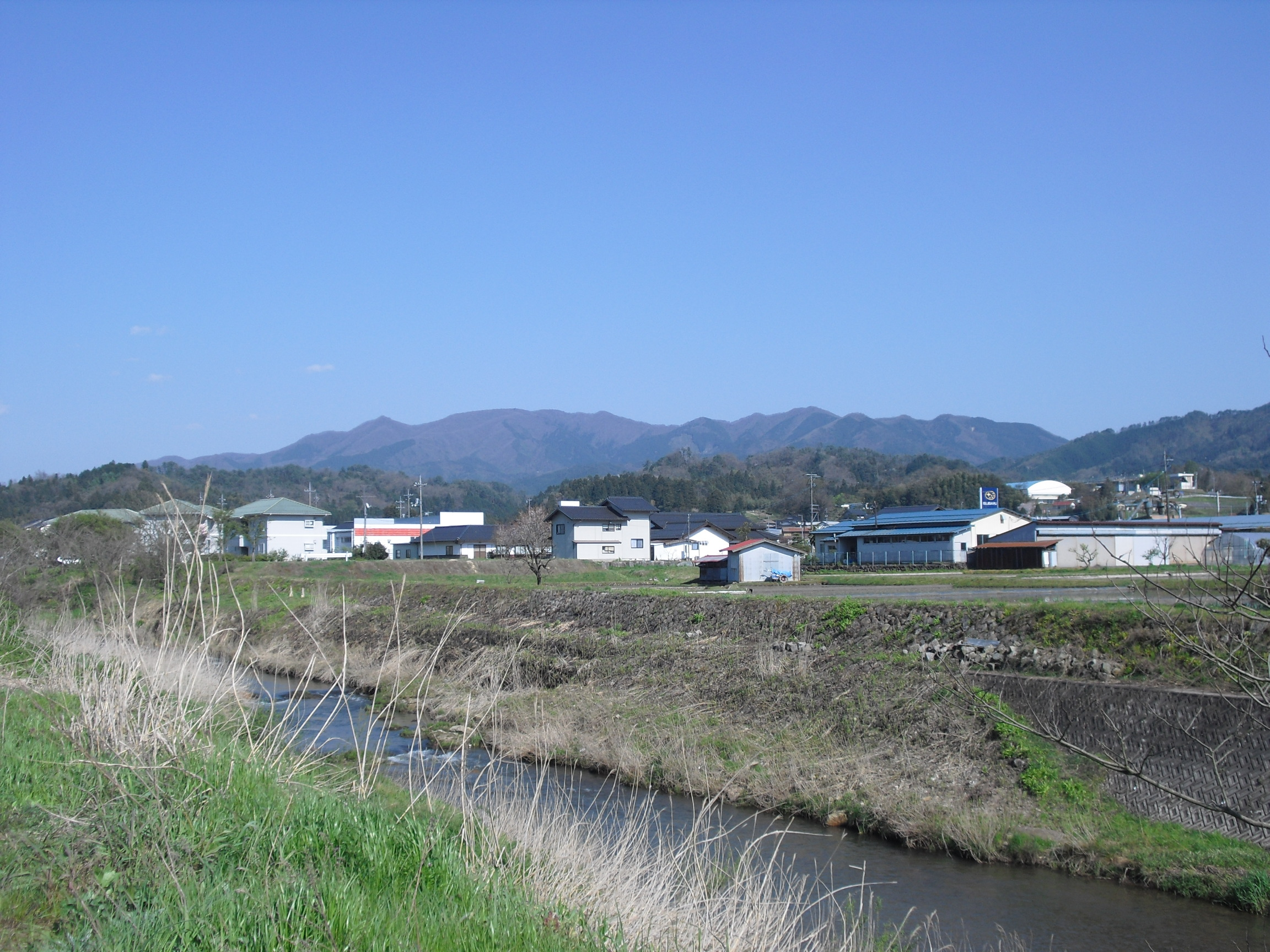
Mount Sentsū as seen from Okuizumo with the Hii River in the foreground

While most accounts identify the headwaters of the river Hi in Izumo (肥河 / 簸之川, Hi-no-Kawa, identified with the Hii River in modern Shimane Prefecture) as the place where Susanoo descended, one variant in the Shoki instead has Susanoo arriving at the upper reaches of the river E (可愛之川 E-no-Kawa) in the province of Aki (identified with the Gōnokawa River in modern Hiroshima Prefecture). In this version, Inadahime - whose name is given here as 'Makamifuru-Kushiinadahime' (真髪触奇稲田媛) - is not yet born when Susanoo slew the Yamata no Orochi.

In one writing it is said:—"At this time Sosa no wo no Mikoto went down and came to the head-waters of the River Ye, in the province of Aki. There was there a God whose name was Ashi-nadzu-te-nadzu. His wife's name was Inada no Miya-nushi Susa no yatsu-mimi. This Deity was just then pregnant, and the husband and wife sorrowed together. So they informed Sosa no wo no Mikoto, saying:—'Though we have had born to us many children, whenever one is born, an eight-forked serpent comes and devours it, and we have not been able to save one. We are now about to have another, and we fear that it also will be devoured. Therefore do we grieve.' Sosa no wo no Mikoto forthwith instructed them, saying:—'You must take fruit of all kinds, and brew from it eight jars of sake, and I will kill the serpent for you.' The two Gods, in accordance with his instructions, prepared sake. When the time came for the child to be born, the serpent came indeed to the door, and was about to devour the child. But Sosa no wo no Mikoto addressed the serpent, and said:—'Thou art an Awful Deity. Can I dare to neglect to feast thee?' So he took the eight jars of sake, and poured one into each of its mouths. The serpent drank it up and fell asleep. Sosa no wo no Mikoto drew his sword and slew it. [...]
Afterwards the child who was born of Inada no Miya-nushi Susa no yatsu-mimi, namely Ina-gami (sic) Furu-kushi-nada-hime, was removed to the upper waters of the river Hi, in the province of ldzumo, and brought up there. After this Sosa no wo no Mikoto made her his consort, and had by her a child, whose descendant in the sixth generation was Oho-na-muchi no Mikoto."

— translation by William George Aston

A legend associated with Yaegaki Shrine in Matsue, Shimane Prefecture claims that Susanoo hid Kushinadahime in an "eightfold fence" (yaegaki) in the forest within the shrine's precincts during his battle with the Yamata no Orochi.

=== In the Izumo Fudoki ===
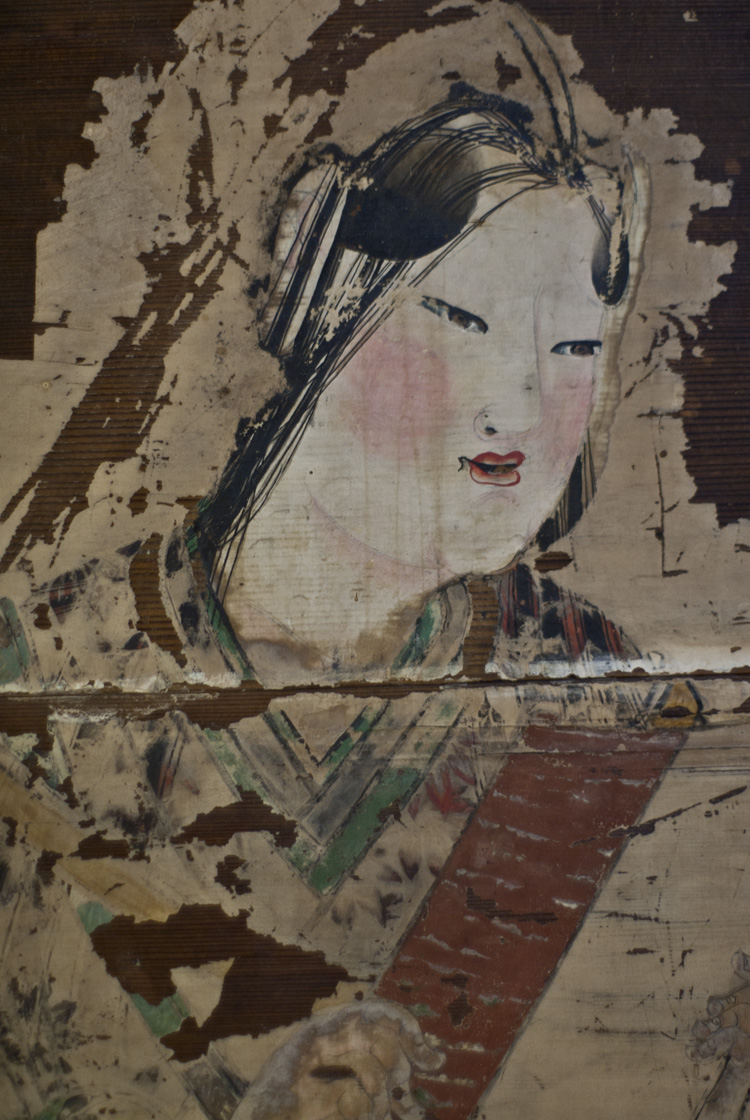
Muromachi period wall painting depicting Kushinadahime (Yaegaki Shrine, Matsue, Shimane Prefecture)

A legend recorded in the Izumo Fudoki concerning the township of Kumatani (熊谷郷) in Iishi District (part of the modern city of Unnan in Shimane) relates that Kushinadahime - as 'Kushiinada-Mitoyomanurahime' - passed through the area while she was about to give birth. The township's name is said to come from her exclamation: "How deep and well hidden (kumakumashiki) this valley (tani) is!"

=== In the Hōki Fudoki ===
An excerpt claimed to be from the now-lost Fudoki of Hōki Province (modern western Tottori Prefecture) relates that Inadahime fled to Hōki and hid in the mountains when the Yamata no Orochi was about to devour her. The province's name (originally Hahaki) is here said to be derived from her cry for help: "Mother, come!" (haha kimase)

== Worship ==
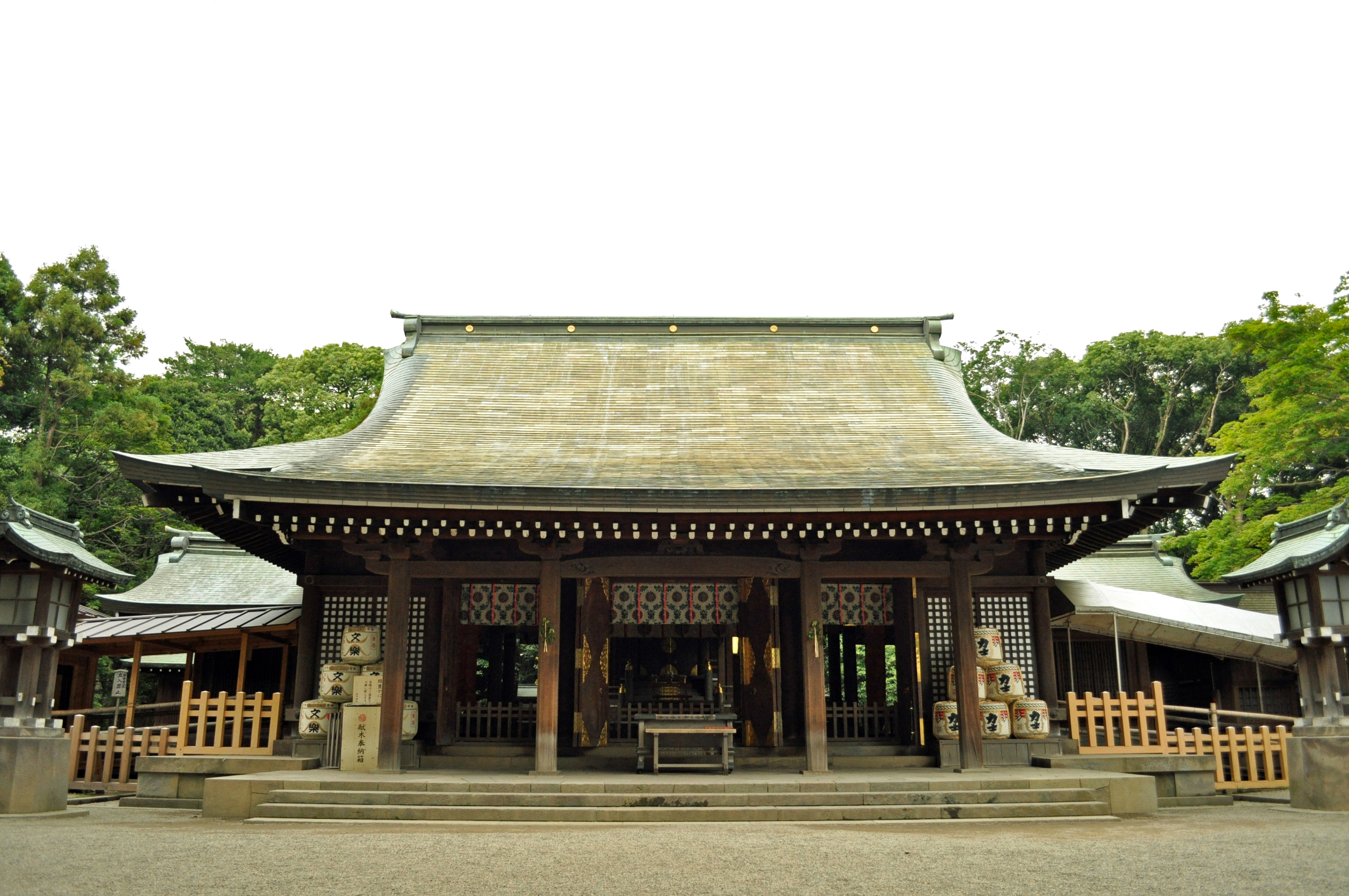
Hikawa Shrine in Saitama, Saitama Prefecture

As with other Shinto kami, Kushinadahime is venerated at many shrines across Japan, usually together with her husband Susanoo but also sometimes by herself or with other (related or unrelated) deities. Some examples of Shinto shrines which enshrine her are as follows.

- Inada Shrine in Okuizumo, Shimane Prefecture

This shrine enshrines Kushinadahime as its main deity, with Susanoo and Ōyamatsumi serving as auxiliary deities. Near the shrine is the Ubuyu-no-Ike (産湯の池, lit. "Birth-Bath Pond"), a pond claimed to be the place where Kushinadahime received her first bath (ubuyu) after being born, and a sasa bamboo grove that is said to have grown out of the bamboo spatula (hera) that was used to cut the newborn Kushinadahime's umbilical cord known as the Sasa-no-Miya (笹の宮).

- Yaegaki Shrine, in Matsue, Shimane Prefecture

Kushinadahime is one of this shrine's deities alongside Susanoo, Ōnamuchi (Ōkuninushi) and Aohata-Sakusahiko (one of Susanoo's children recorded in the Izumo Fudoki). As mentioned above, shrine legend claims that Susanoo hid Kushinadahime in the wooded area within the shrine's precincts known as Sakusame Forest (佐久佐女の森 Sakusame no mori) during his battle with the Yamata no Orochi.

- Susa Shrine in Izumo, Shimane Prefecture

This shrine's deities are Susanoo, Kushinadahime, Tenazuchi and Ashinazuchi. Located in the former township of Susa (須佐郷), a place closely associated with Susanoo; indeed, a legend recorded in the Izumo Fudoki states that Susanoo himself enshrined his spirit here. The shrine's priestly lineage, the Susa (or Inada) clan (須佐氏 / 稲田氏), were considered to be Susanoo's descendants via his son Yashimashino-no-Mikoto (八島篠命, the Kojiki's Yashimajinumi) or Ōkuninushi.

- Suga Shrine in Unnan, Shimane Prefecture

This shrine is claimed to stand on the site of the palace Susanoo built after defeating the Yamata no Orochi and enshrines Susanoo, Kushinadahime, and their son Suga-no-Yuyamanushi-Minasarohiko-Yashima-no-Mikoto (清之湯山主三名狭漏彦八島野命, i.e. Yashimajinumi).

- Kushida Shrine (櫛田宮 Kushida-gū) in Kanzaki, Saga Prefecture

Dedicated to Susanoo, Kushinadahime, and Yamato Takeru. Legend claims that the shrine was founded by Yamato Takeru's father Emperor Keikō, who visited the area and enshrined these three deities. A camphor tree in the shrine grounds is said to have grown out of a koto that the emperor buried in the ground.

- Kushida Shrine (櫛田神社 Kushida-jinja) in Imizu, Toyama Prefecture

This shrine, claimed to have been founded by Takenouchi no Sukune, enshrines Susanoo and Kushinadahime as its principal deities.

- Yasaka Shrine in Gion, Higashiyama, Kyoto, Kyoto Prefecture
- Hiromine Shrine in Himeji, Hyōgo Prefecture
- Hikawa Shrine in Ōmiya, Saitama, Saitama Prefecture

The ichinomiya of former Musashi Province, dedicated to Susanoo, Kushinadahime, and Ōnamuchi. Many of its branch shrines - concentrated in Saitama Prefecture and Tokyo - such as Akasaka Hikawa Shrine (Akasaka, Minato City, Tokyo) or Kawagoe Hikawa Shrine (Kawagoe, Saitama) also venerate these three deities, though some either enshrine Susanoo alone or pair him with other gods (e.g. Azabu Hikawa Shrine in Moto-Azabu, Minato, Tokyo, dedicated to Susanoo and Yamato Takeru).

- Inada Shrine in Kasama, Ibaraki Prefecture

This shrine to Kushinadahime is classified in the Jinmyōchō (神名帳, lit. 'Register of Shrine Names') section of the Engishiki as a 'notable shrine' or myōjin-taisha, attesting to its status since antiquity. The shrine's original site is located some 300 meters northwest of the current location, situated beside a spring-fed pond known as Yoshii (好井). According to legend, Kushinadahime appeared to a child who was drawing water from the spring and asked that shrines dedicated to her, her husband Susanoo, and her parents Tenazuchi and Ashinazuchi be built there.

=== Kushinadahime and Harisaijo ===
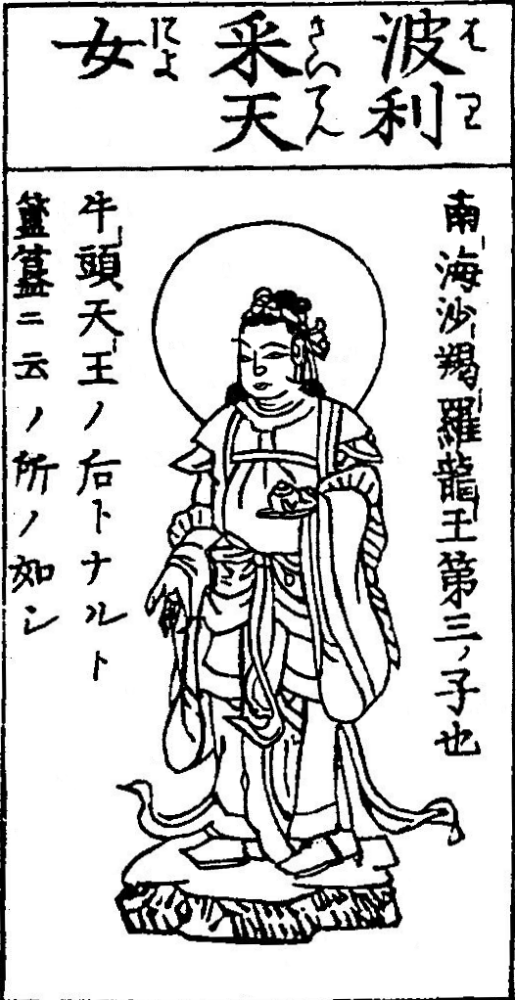
Harisai Tennyo, from the Butsuzōzui

During the medieval and early modern periods, Susanoo was popularly conflated with the pestilence deity Gozu Tennō, the god originally worshiped in Yasaka Shrine in Kyoto, Hiromine Shrine in Hyōgo Prefecture, and Tsushima Shrine in Tsushima, Aichi Prefecture. As Susanoo's consort, Kushinadahime was in turn identified with Gozu Tennō's wife, Harisaijo (頗梨采女 or 波利采女, also known as 'Harisainyo', 'Barisainyo', or 'Harisai Tennyo' (頗梨采天女)), the third daughter of the dragon (nāga) king Sāgara. Indeed, while Yasaka Shrine in Kyoto currently enshrines Susanoo, his wives (Kushinadahime, Kamu-Ōichihime, and Samirahime), and his eight children (Yashimajinumi, I(so)takeru, Ōya(tsu)hime, Tsumatsuhime, Ōtoshi, Ukanomitama, Ōyabiko, and Suseribime), its original deities were Gozu Tennō, Harisaijo, and their eight sons, collectively known as the 'Eight Princes' (八王子, Hachiōji).

== Legacy ==
The asteroid 10613 Kushinadahime, discovered in 1997, is named after Kushinadahime.

Kushinadahime was portrayed by Misa Uehara in the 1959 film The Birth of Japan.

In the Nintendo video game Golden Sun: The Lost Age, characters named Kushinada and Susa are roughly based on Kushinadahime and Susanoo.

== See also ==
- Somin Shōrai
- Susanoo
