= Omamori =

Japanese Shinto and Buddhist amulet

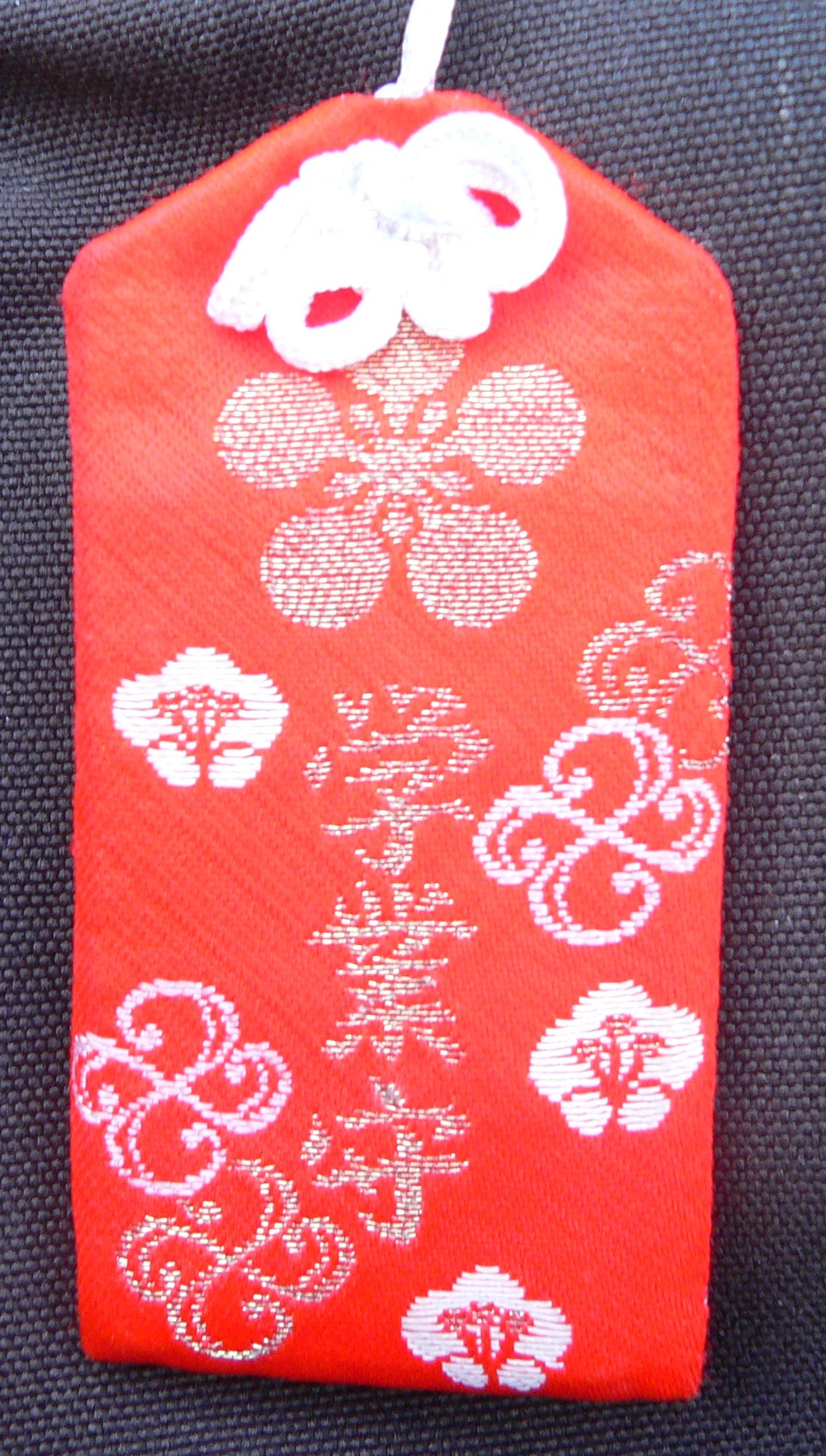
A study-dedicated omamori. The logo above denotes a Shinto shrine dedicated to the kami Tenjin.

Omamori (御守/お守り) are Japanese amulets commonly sold at Shinto shrines and Buddhist temples, dedicated to particular Shinto kami as well as Buddhist figures and are said to provide various forms of luck and protection.

== Origin and usage ==
The word mamori (守り) means 'protection', with omamori being the sonkeigo (honorific) form of the word. Originally made from paper or wood, modern amulets are small items usually kept inside a brocade bag and may contain a prayer, religious inscription of invocation. Omamori are available at both Shinto shrines and Buddhist temples with few exceptions and are available for sale, regardless of one's religious affiliation.

Omamori are then made sacred through the use of ritual, and are said to contain busshin (spiritual offshoots) in a Shinto context or kesshin (manifestations) in a Buddhist context.

While omamori are intended for temple tourists' personal use, they are mainly viewed as a donation to the temple or shrine the person is visiting. Visitors often give omamori as a gift to another person as a physical form of well-wishing.

== Design and function ==
Omamori are usually covered with brocaded silk and enclose paper or pieces of wood with prayers written on them, which are supposed to bring good luck to the bearer on particular occasions, tasks, or ordeals. Omamori are also used to ward off bad luck and are often spotted on bags, hung on cellphone straps, in cars, etc.

Omamori have changed over the years from being made mostly of paper and/or wood to being made out of a wide variety of materials (i.e. bumper decals, bicycle reflectors, credit cards, etc.). Modern commercialism has also taken over a small part of the production of omamori. Usually this happens when more popular shrines and temples cannot keep up with the high demand for certain charms. They then turn to factories to manufacture the omamori. However, priests have been known to complain about the quality and authenticity of the products made by factories.

According to Yanagita Kunio (1969):

Japanese have probably always believed in amulets of one kind or another, but the modern printed charms now given out by shrines and temples first became popular in the Tokugawa period or later, and the practice of a person wearing miniature charms is also new. The latter custom is particularly common in cities.

== Usage ==
An omamori from a shrine in Kumamoto. This item claims to "grant protection" to the user. The logo above denotes the shrine Fujisaki Hachimangū.

Omamori may provide general blessings and protection, or may have a specific focus such as:

- Kōtsū-anzen: traffic safety-protection for drivers and travelers of all sorts
- Yaku-yoke: avoidance of evil
- Kaiun: open luck, better fortune
- Gakugyō-jōju: education and passing examinations—for students and scholars
- Shōbai-hanjō: prosperity in business—success in business and matters of money
- En-musubi: acquisition of a mate and marriage—available for singles and couples to ensure love and marriage
- Anzan: protection for pregnant women for a healthy pregnancy and easy delivery
- Kanai-anzen: safety (well-being) of one's family, peace and prosperity in the household

Customarily, omamori are not opened in order to avoid losing their protective benefits. They are instead carried on one's person, or tied to something like a backpack or a purse. It is not necessary, but amulets are customarily replaced once a year to ward off bad luck from the previous year. Old amulets are usually returned to the same shrine or temple they were purchased from so they can be disposed of properly. Amulets are commonly returned on or slightly after the Japanese New Year so the visitor has a fresh start for the New Year with a new omamori.

Old omamori traditionally should not be disposed of, but burned, as a sign of respect to the deity that assisted the person throughout the year.

If a shrine or temple visitor cannot find an omamori that meets their need, they can request for a priest to have one made. If enough people request for this same type of omamori, the temple or shrine may start producing them for everyday availability.

== Modern commercial uses ==
There are modern commercial versions of omamori that are typically not spiritual in nature and are not issued by a shrine or temple. It has become popular for stores in Japan to feature generic omamori with popular characters such as Mickey Mouse, Hello Kitty, Snoopy, Kewpie, etc.

== See also ==
- Ema
- Fulu
- Hōko
- Kamidana
- Koban
- Magatama
- Netsuke
- Ofuda
- O-mikuji
- Somin Shōrai
- Spirit tablet
- Tanzaku
- Thai Buddha amulet
