= Yasaka Shrine =

Shinto shrine in Gion District, Kyoto, Japan

Yasaka Shrine (八坂神社, Yasaka-jinja)
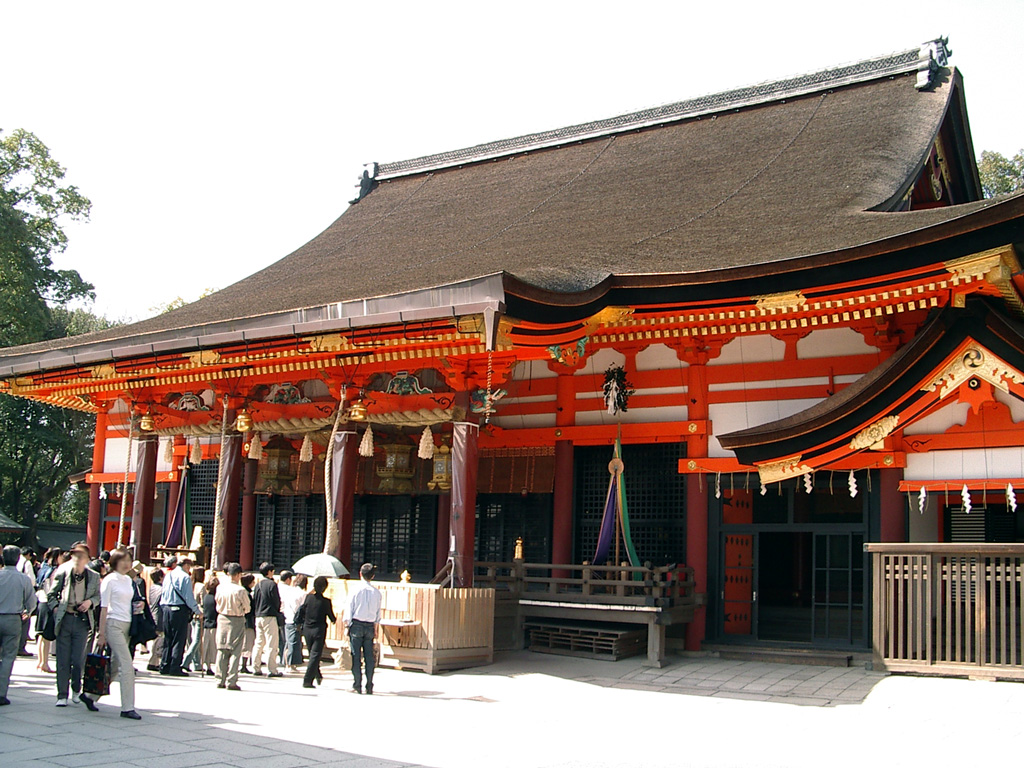
- Yasaka Shrine

- Location within Japan

Religion
- Affiliation: Shinto
- Deity: Susanoo-no-Mikoto (Note: Originally Gozu Tenno); Yashimajinumi

Location
- Location: Gion, Kyoto, Japan
- Coordinates: 35°00′13″N 135°46′43″E

Architecture
- Style: Gion zukuri
- Established: 656

Yasaka Shrine (八坂神社, Yasaka-jinja), once called Gion Shrine (祇園神社, Gion-jinja), is a Shinto shrine in the Gion District of Kyoto, Japan. Situated at the east end of Shijō-dōri (Fourth Avenue), the shrine includes several buildings, including gates, a main hall and a stage. The Yasaka shrine is dedicated to Susanoo in the tradition of the Gion faith as its chief kami, with his consort Kushinadahime on the east, and eight offspring deities (mikogami, collectively known as yahashira no mikogami) on the west. The yahashira no mikogami include Yashimajinumi no kami, Itakeru no kami, Ōyatsuhime no kami, Tsumatsuhime no kami, Ōtoshi no kami, Ukanomitama no kami, Ōyatsuhiko no kami, and Suseribime no mikoto.

== History ==
Initial construction on the Shrine began in 656. The Shrine became the object of Imperial patronage during the early Heian period.

According to the Engishiki Jinmyocho, the much lesser known Nunakuma Shrine in Fukuyama is the source by which Gozu Tenno entered Yasaka Shrine through Kanjo.

In 965, Emperor Murakami ordered that Imperial messengers be sent to report important events to the guardian kami of Japan. These heihaku were initially presented to 16 shrines; and in 991, Emperor Ichijō added three more shrines to Murakami's list. Three years later in 994, Ichijō refined the scope of that composite list by adding Umenomiya Shrine and Gion Shrine.

During the Meiji Restoration, as part of the state-enforced separation of Buddhism and Shinto, it was converted to Yasaka Shrine, and worship was changed from Gozo Tenno to Susanoo.

From 1871 through 1946, Yasaka Shrine was officially designated one of the Kanpei-taisha (官幣大社), meaning that it stood in the first rank of government supported shrines.

== Matsuri ==
In the year 869, a terrible epidemic caused the Emperor to call for a Shinto ritual to appease vengeful spirits believed to be the cause. Representatives used 66 pikes (hoko or 鉾) for each of 66 regions in the country at that time, in a Shinto ritual called goryo-e (御霊会) at Shinsenen, a lake at the Imperial Palace at that time. Eventually, the ritual became an annual event known as the Gion Goryo-e, and then the Gion Matsuri, associated with Gion Shrine, in the Gion district of Kyoto. The pikes became decorated, larger, and eventually morphed into the famous Gion Matsuri yamaboko (山鉾) floats. These travel through the central streets of Kyoto, as do mikoshi (portable shrines) from Yasaka Shrine, to purify the streets and ward off any potential epidemics or other harm. The Gion Matsuri takes place every July.

Today, in addition to hosting the Gion Matsuri, Yasaka Shrine welcomes thousands of people every New Year, for traditional Japanese New Year rituals and celebrations. In April, the crowds pass through the temple on their way to Maruyama Park, a popular hanami (cherry blossom viewing) site. Lanterns decorate the stage with the names of festival sponsors.

== Gallery ==
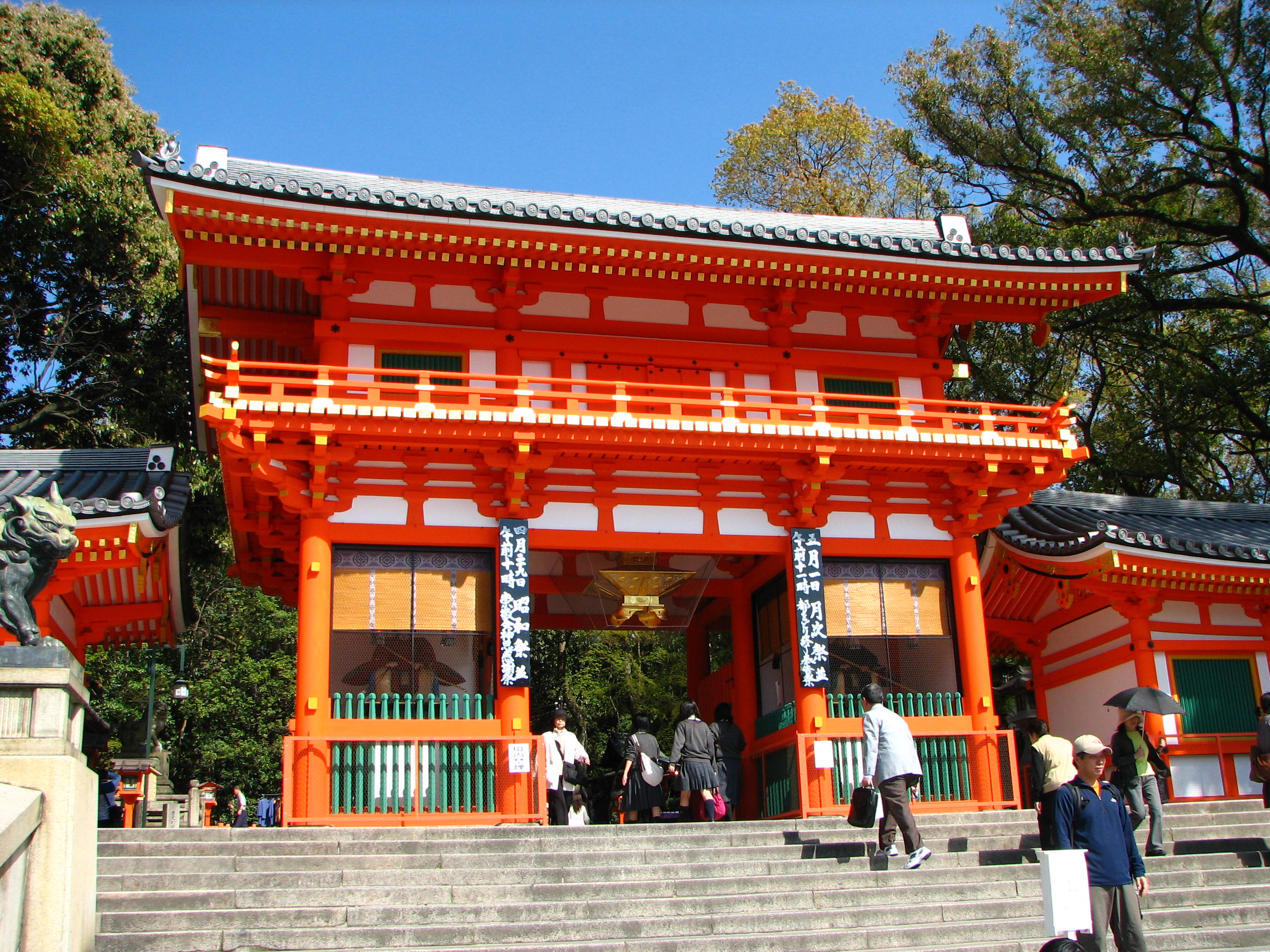
Main gate of the Yasaka shrine.

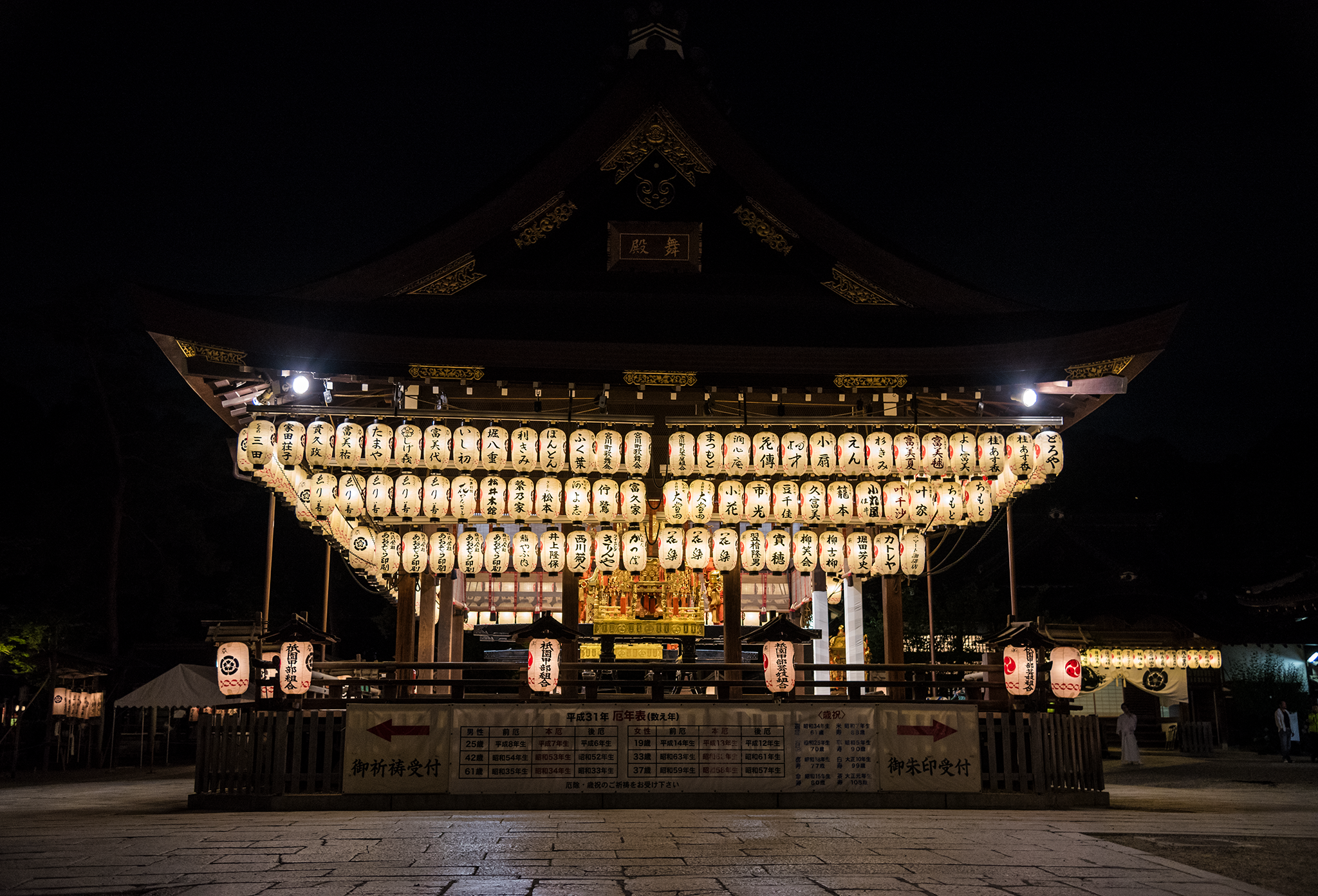
Stage at night during the annual Gion Matsuri.

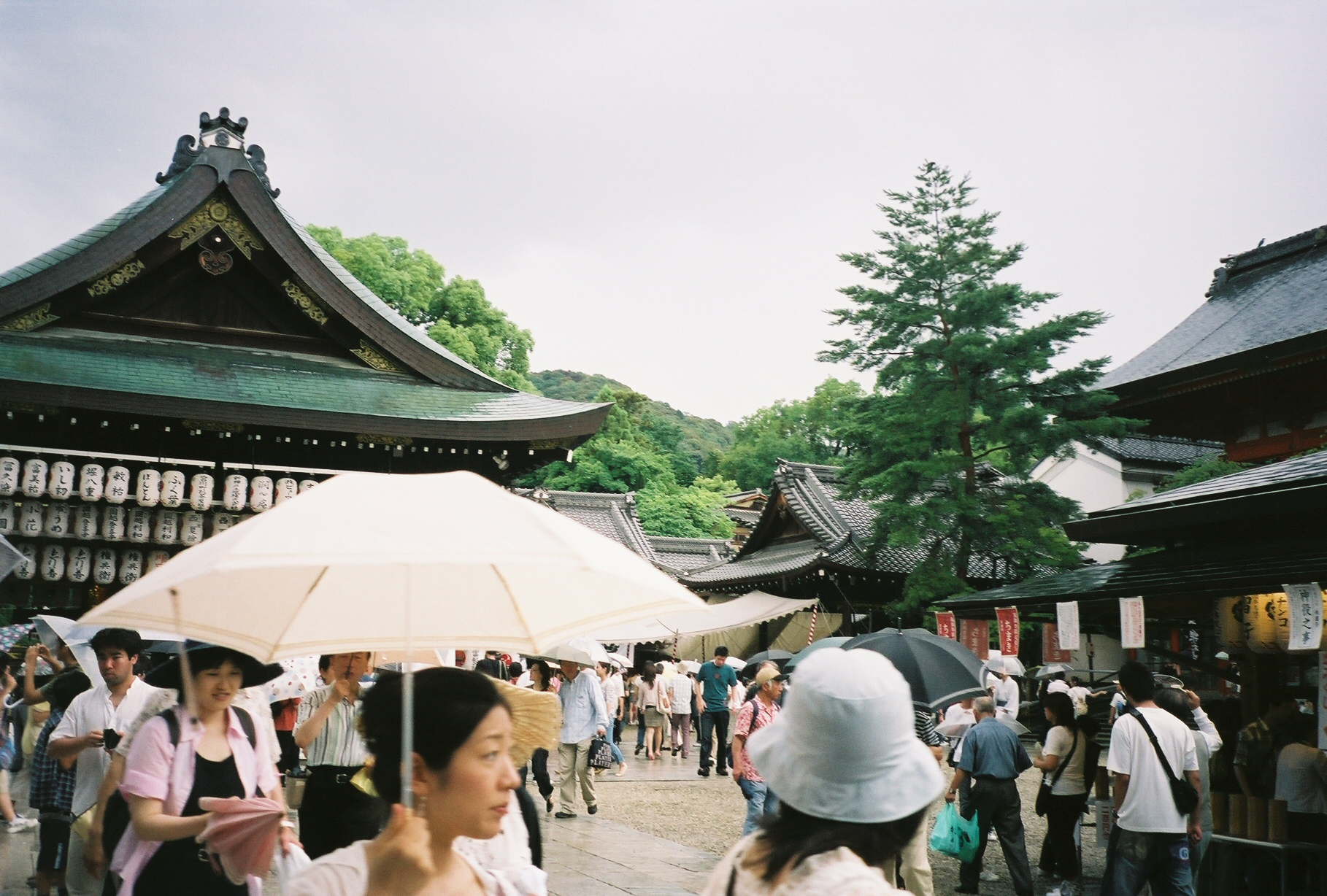
Crowds during the Gion Matsuri.

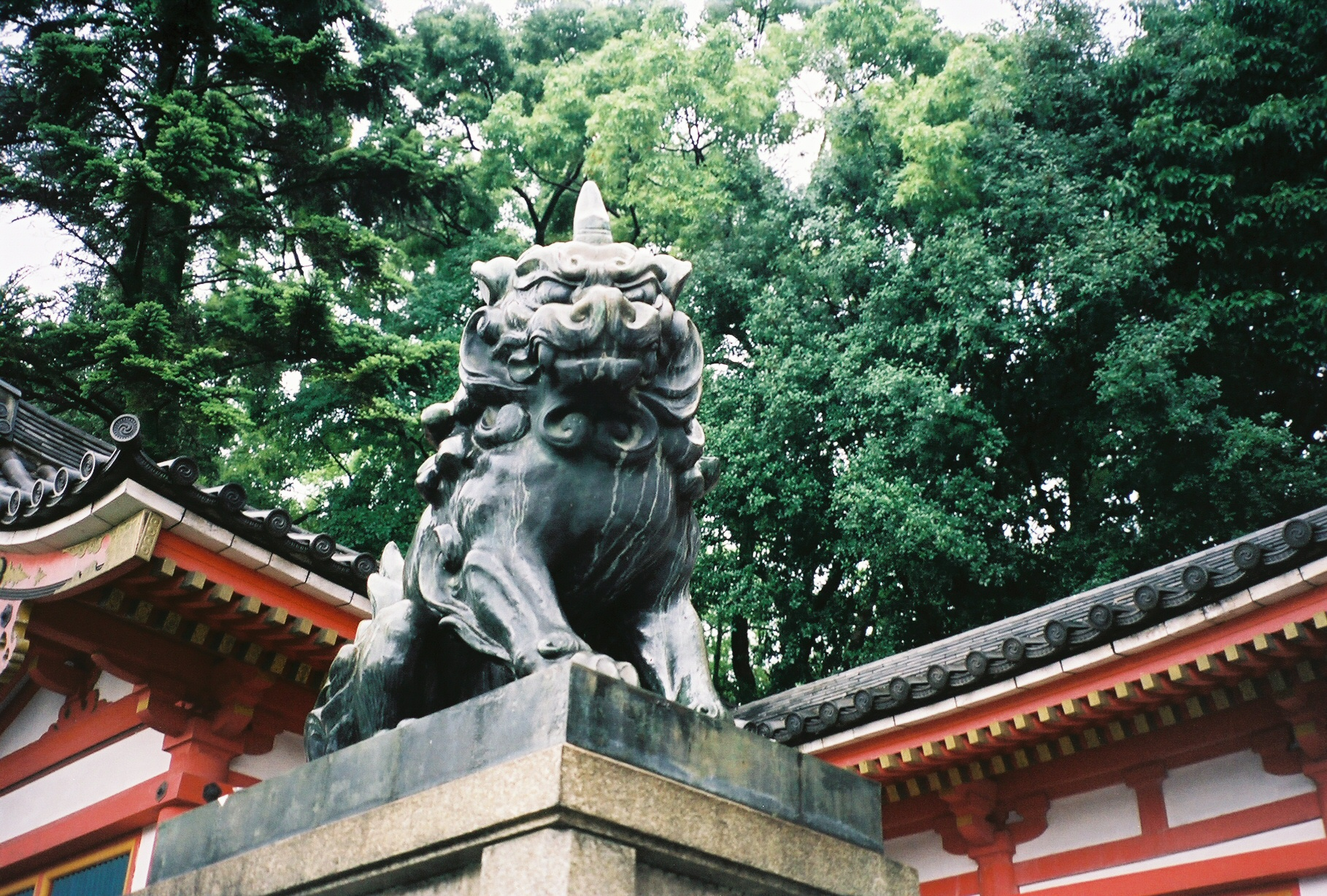
A statue outside of the shrine.

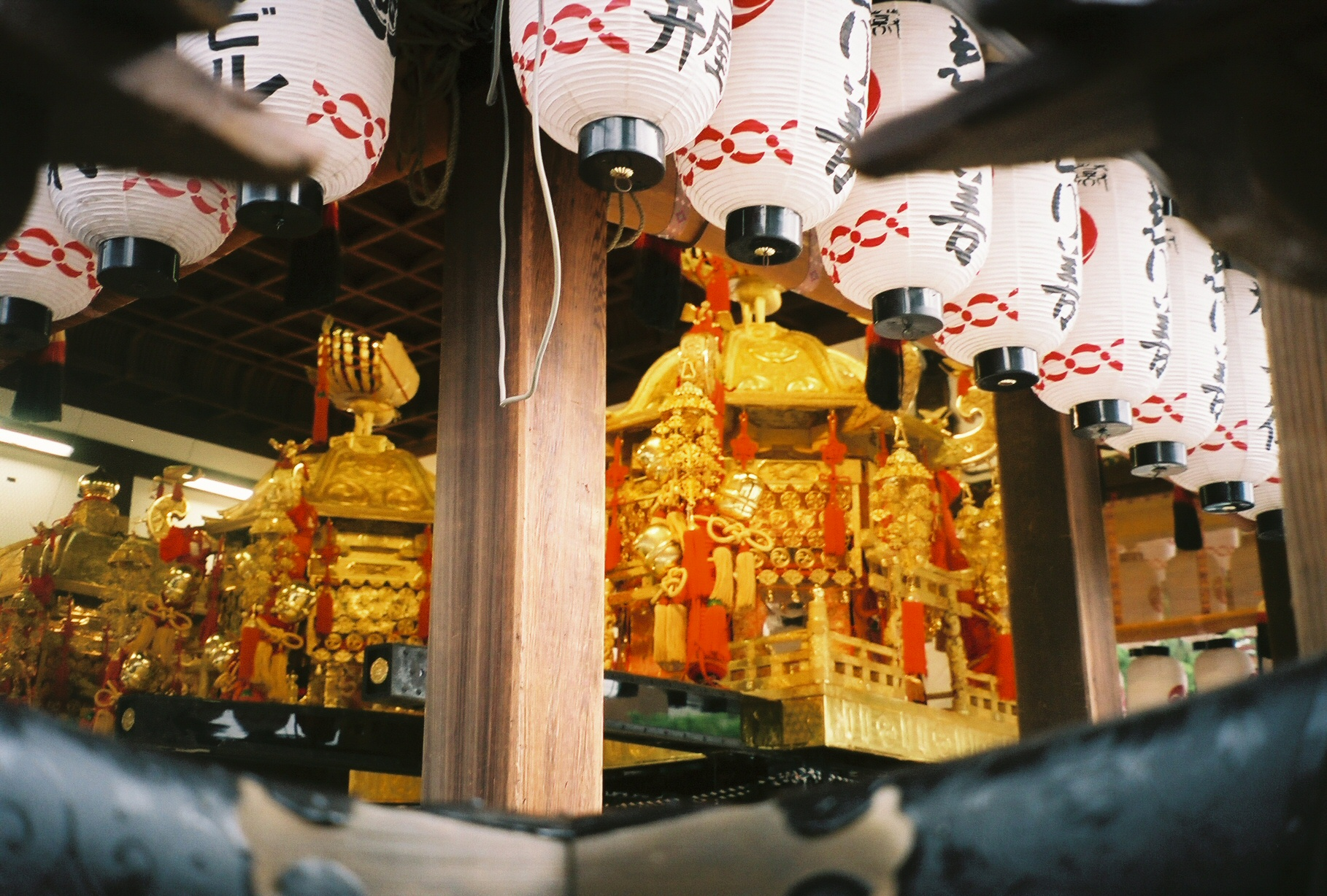
The mikoshi of the Yasaka shrine, displayed for part of the Gion Matsuri in the second week of July.

== See also ==
- List of Shinto shrines
- Modern system of ranked Shinto Shrines
- Twenty-Two Shrines
