= Yaegaki Shrine =

Shinto shrine in Shimane Prefecture, Japan

Yaegaki Shrine (八重垣神社, Yaegaki Jinja)
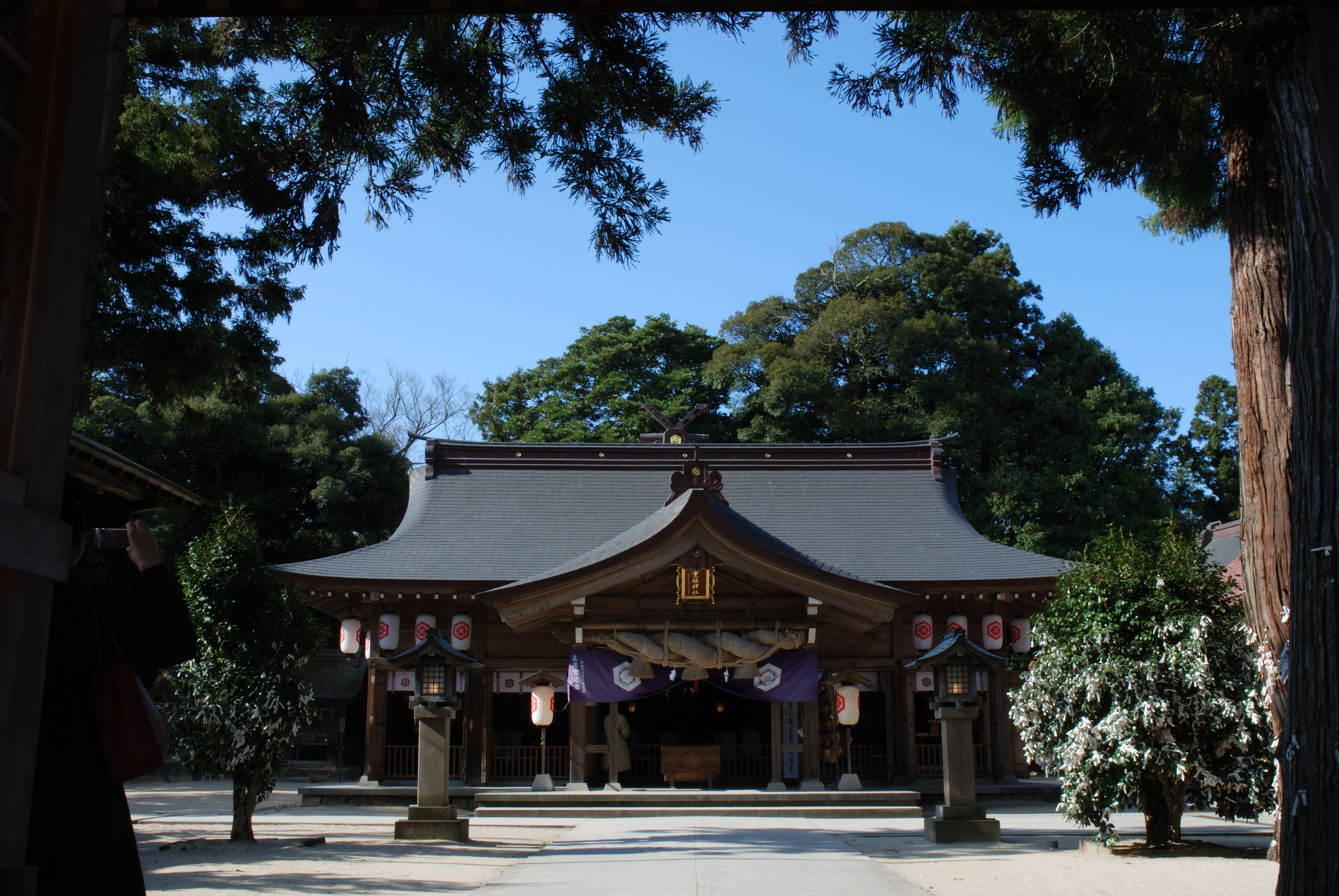
- Yaegaki Shrine.

- Location within Japan

Religion
- Affiliation: Shinto

Location
- Interactive map of Yaegaki Shrine (八重垣神社, Yaegaki Jinja)
- Coordinates: 35°25′44.53″N 133°4′25.26″E

Yaegaki Shrine (八重垣神社, Yaegaki Jinja), formerly known as Sakusa Shrine (佐久佐神社, Sakusa Jinja), is a Shinto shrine in Matsue, Shimane Prefecture, Japan.

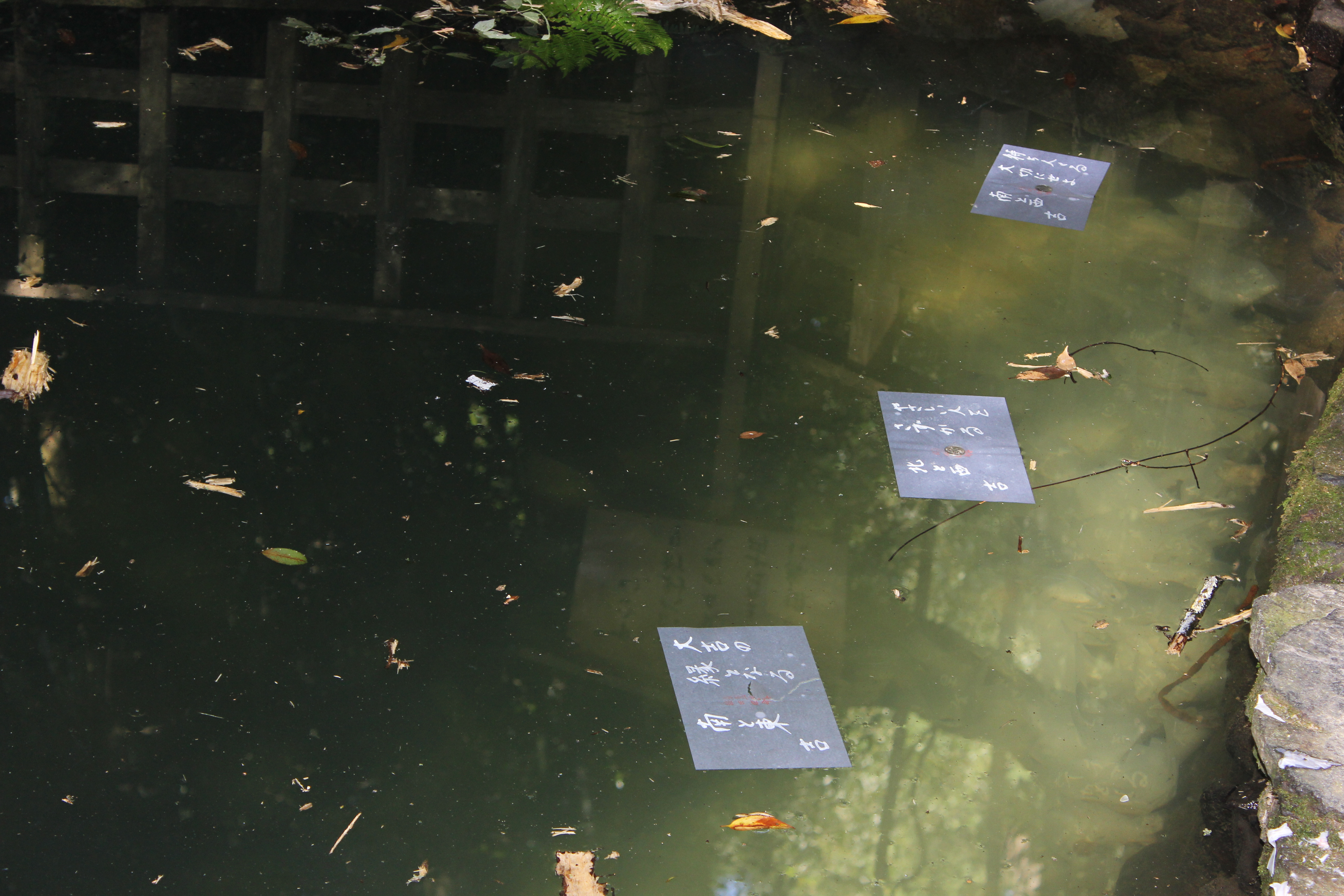
Kagaminoike of Yaegaki Shrine

== History ==
The gods Susanoo and princess Kushinada-hime are enshrined here. This shrine is dedicated to marriage and matchmaking. The people who come to this shrine often pray for a marriage partner, good marital relations, pregnancy and healthy child-bearing. In keeping with this theme, several large wooden phalluses can be found on the shrine's grounds.

According to legend, Susanoo came across a couple who had lost seven of their eight daughters to an eight-headed serpent, the Yamata-no-orochi (lit., "Eight-Pronged-Serpent"). The serpent was due to return for the last daughter, Princess Kushinada, when Susanoo arrived. Through his ingenuity, Susanoo slew the serpent and won Kushinada's hand in marriage.

The Yaegaki Shrine was erected in the spot where Susanoo built a house for himself and Kushinada to live.

At the shrine, visitors can see the Mirror Pond. One can place a paper on the water's surface and a divining coin on the paper; the amount of time the coin stays afloat on the paper is supposed to indicate the fate of one's marriage.

In the shrine's treasure house is an ancient depiction of the enshrined Princess Inata, painted on Japanese Cypress. It is believed to be the oldest shrine wall mural in Japan.

- Journey To The End
