= Kayanohime =

Shinto kami

- Goddess of Grass, Plains, Fields, Herbs and Cucumbers
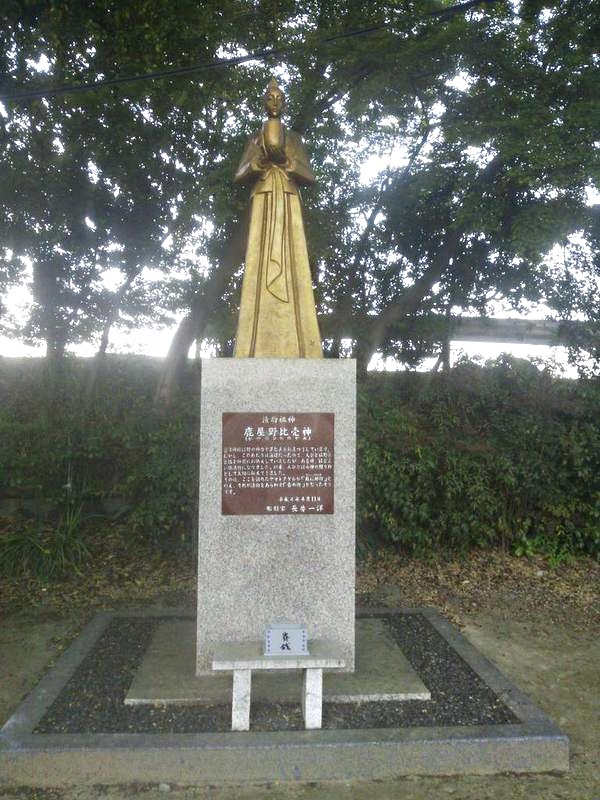
- Statue of Kayanohime at Kayazu Shrine in Ama, Aichi Prefecture
- Other names: Kanoyanohime (鹿屋野比売神), Kusanooyakayanohime (草祖草野姫), Kusanohime (草野姫命), and Nozuchi (野槌)
- Japanese: 草祖草野
- Gender: Female

Genealogy
- Parents: Izanami and Izanagi
- Siblings: Ōyamatsumi; Amaterasu; Tsukuyomi; Susanoo; (and others)
- Consort: Ōyamatsumi
- Children: Kamuōichihime; Iwanagahime; Sakuyahime; Konohanachiruhime; Ashinazuchi and Tenazuchi

Kayanohime (草祖草野), also called Nozuchi (野槌), is the Japanese goddess of grass and fields. She is considered the protector of fields. She is also considered the ancestor of herbs.

She is the daughter of Izanami and Izanagi. She is married to her husband and brother Ōyamatsumi, and gave birth to eight deities. Some versions of her origin story claim she is also the mother of Konohanasakuya-hime.

== Worship ==
In the past, people often prayed to her before cutting down wood or reeds for building. She was worshipped because the plants that she favored provided the raw materials for furniture and houses.
