= Iwanagahime =

Kami

- Goddess of Immortality
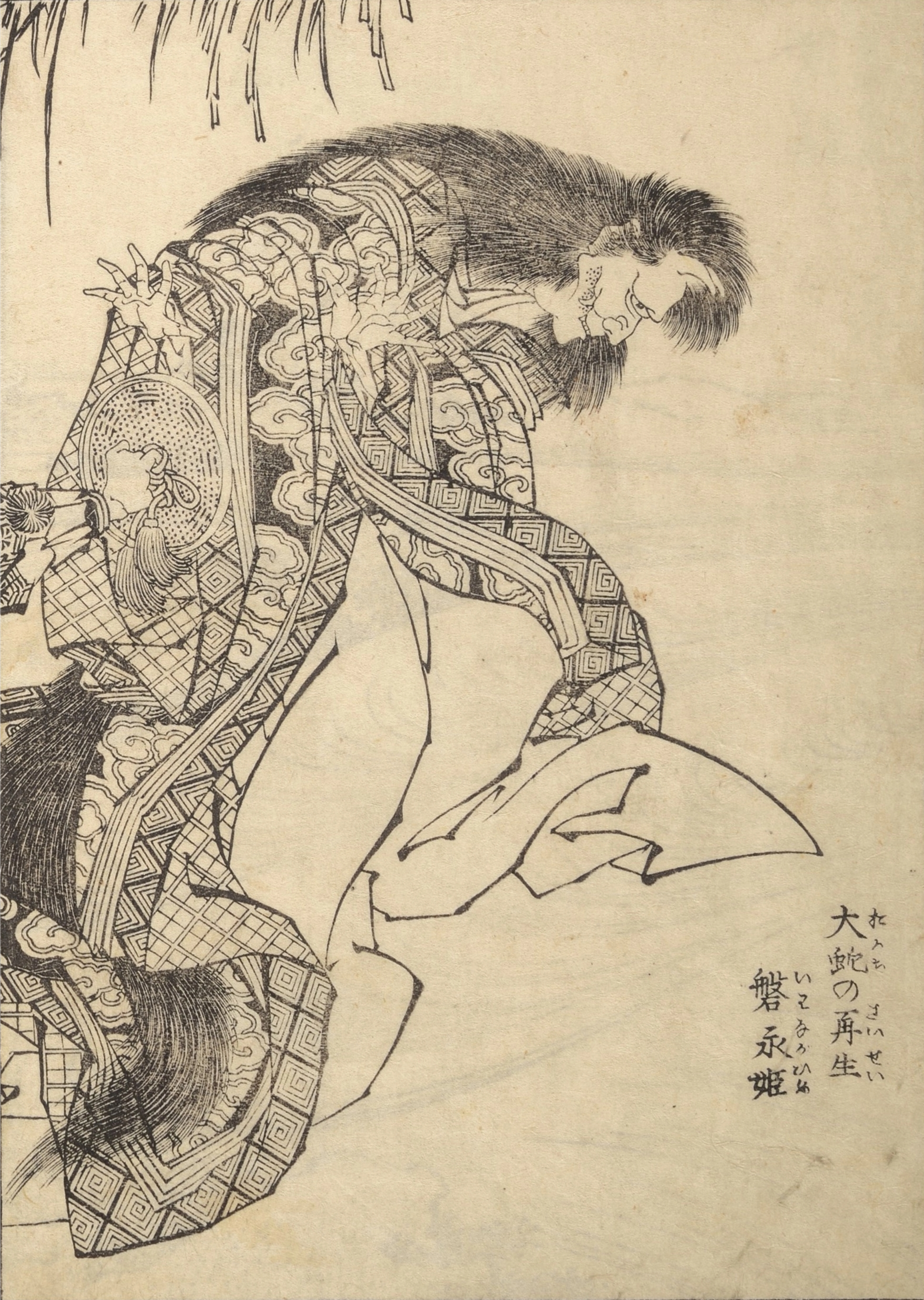
- Iwanagahime, print by Hokusai, 1836
- Texts: Kojiki, Nihon Shoki, Sendai Kuji Hongi

Genealogy
- Parents: Ōyamatsumi (father); Kayanohime (mother)
- Siblings: Kamuōichihime; Sakuyahime; Ashinazuchi and Tenazuchi

Iwanagahime is a kami in Japanese mythology. She is the goddess of immortality. She is also the daughter of Ōyamatsumi, and sister to Sakuyahime. She is said to be enshrined at Kifune Shrine.

== Mythology ==
Ōyamatsumi offered both of his daughters, Sakuyahime and Iwanagahime, in marriage to Ninigi. However Ninigi rejected Iwanagahime due to her ugliness and returned her to her father.

According to the Kojiki, Ōyamatsumi told Ninigi that he offered both of his daughters so that the emperors would live forever, like the rocks. But, since Iwanagahime was rejected, the emperors will live short lives as punishment.

According to one version of the Nihongi, being rejected by Ninigi angered Iwanagahime so much that she cursed him, the emperors, and all human beings to live ephemeral lives, just like sakura blossoms. This story is used as an explanation for the shortness of human life.

In a different version of the Nihongi, Ninigi found both sisters weaving on a loom in a palace on the ocean waves.
