= Toshigami =

Shinto kami

- Harvest, grain
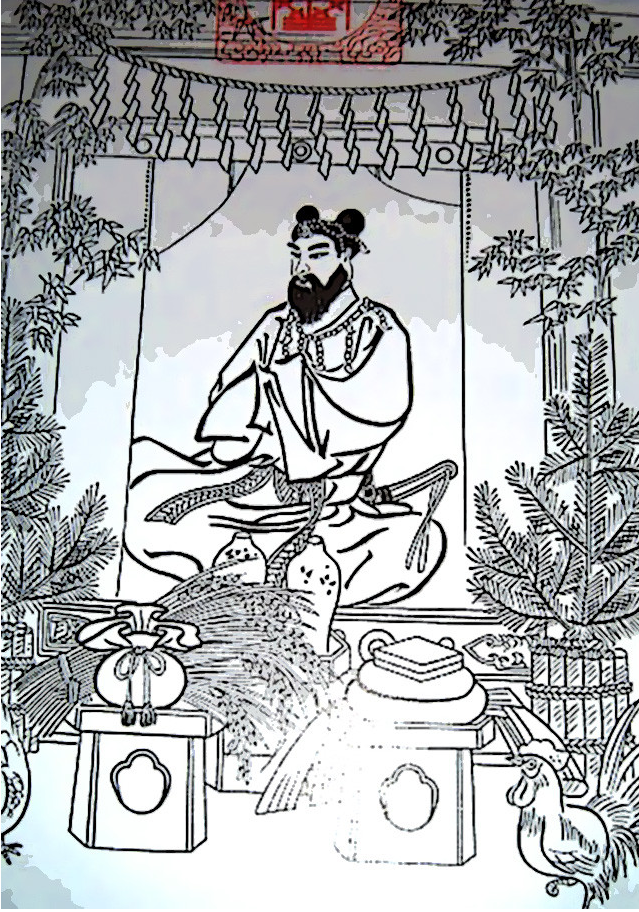
- Other names: Toshigami (大年神)
- 年神 or 歳神: Japanese

Genealogy
- Parents: Susanoo (father); Kamuōichi-hime (mother)
- Siblings: Ukanomitama
- Consorts: Ino-hime (伊怒比売); Kaguyo-hime (香用比売); Amechikarumizu-hime (天知迦流美豆比売)
- Offspring: Oyamakui no Kami

Toshigami (年神 or 歳神, Toshigami or Tomo; lit. "year god"), also known as Ōtoshi-no-kami (大年神; lit. "great year god"), is a Japanese kami and a part of the Shinto pantheon.

== Etymology ==
The 年 (nen) kanji originally meant "harvest", which became "year" over time as harvest happened once each year. Toshigami was therefore the god of abundant harvests, and specifically of grain or rice. The character 神 (kami) literally means "god" or "deity".

== Mythology ==
=== Parentage and siblings ===
According to the Kojiki, Toshigami was the son of Susanoo and Kamuo Ichihime and the older brother of Ukanomitama.

=== Family ===
Toshigami had offspring through three different wives: Ino-hime (伊怒比売), Kaguyo-hime (香用比売), and Amechikarumizu-hime (天知迦流美豆比売). Through Ino-hime, his children include Ohokuni-mitama (大国御魂神), Kara-kami (韓神), Sofuri-kami (曾富理神), Shirahi-no-kami (白日神), and Hijiri-no-kami (聖神). His children by Kaguyo-hime include Ōkaguyama-tomi (大香山戸臣神) and Mitoshi-no-kami (御年神). With Amechikarumizu-hime, he had Okitsu-hiko-no-kami (奥津日子神), Okitsu-hime-no-mikoto (奥津比売命), Oyamakui-no-kami (大山咋神), Niwa-tsuhi-no-kami (庭津日神), Asuha-no-kami, Hahiki-no-kami, Kaguyama-tomi-no-kami (香山戸臣神), Hayamato-no-kami (羽山戸神), Niwataka-tsuhi-no-kami (庭高津日神), and Ōtsuchi-no-kami (大土神).

== Worship ==
Toshigami is believed to visit homes at every New Year. The decorations put out for the new year, such as kadomatsu and the kagami mochi rice cakes, were originally offerings to him.

His home is believed to be on Shimokoshiki-shima Island, off the coast of Kagoshima Prefecture in Kyushu.

Toshigami's name refers to the rice harvest. In ancient Japan, Toshigami was also worshipped as a patron of good harvests at the start of the year, influencing Japanese new year's traditions.

== See also ==
- Seven Lucky Gods
