= Ikasuri Shrine =

Shrine in Osaka Prefecture, Japan

Coordinates: 34°40′51″N 135°29′55″E

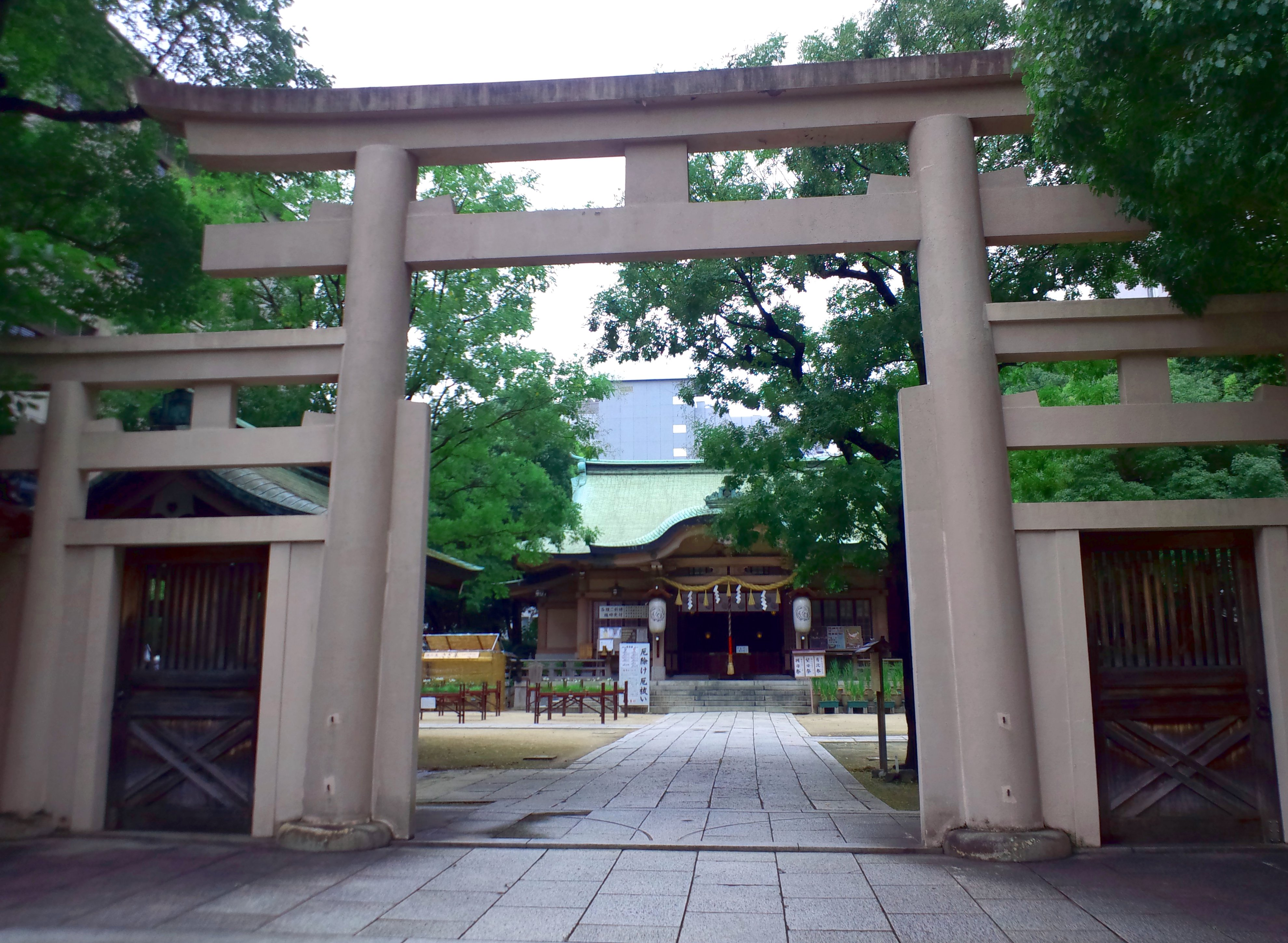

Religion
- Deity: Zamagami

Location
- Location: Watanabe-3, Kyūtarō-machi, Chūō-ku, Osaka City, Osaka, Japan
- Interactive map of Ikasuri Shrine

Ikasuri Shrine (坐摩神社, Ikasuri jinja, also known as Zama jinja) is a major Shinto shrine located in central Osaka, Japan. Its annual festival is on April 22. In the former modern system of ranked Shinto shrines it was an imperial shrine of the second rank or kanpei-chūsha (官幣中社). It was also the ichinomiya of the former Settsu Province. It enshrines five kami known as ikasuri no kami or zama no kami: Ikui no kami (生井神), Sakui no kami (福井神), Tsunagai no kami (綱長井神), Hahiki no kami (波比祇神), and Asuha no kami (阿須波神); collectively known as Zamagami (座摩神)

== History ==
It was founded by Empress Jingu when she returned from the Three Han (三韓, Korea) campaign.

She was nearly shipwrecked but managed to survive thanks to praying to Watatsumi, and she made the shrine to honor him. Ikuta Shrine and Watatsumi Shrine were both also made at the same time by the Empress.

== Zamagami ==
Asuha-no-kami

Genealogy
- Parents: Toshigami (father); Amechikarumizu-hime (天知迦流美豆比売) (mother)
- Siblings: Hahiki-no-kami

Two of the goddesses composing Zamagami: Asuha-no-kami and Hahiki-no-kami are daughters of Toshigami

Hahiki-no-kami

Genealogy
- Parents: Toshigami (father); Amechikarumizu-hime (天知迦流美豆比売) (mother)
- Siblings: Asuha-no-kami

== See also ==
- List of Shinto shrines in Japan
