= Kamu Ōichihime =

Japanese deity (kami)

- Goddess of Markets, Trade, and Agriculture
- Other names: Ohtoshimioya-no-Mikoto (大歳御祖命)
- Japanese: 神大市比売

Genealogy
- Parents: Ōyamatsumi (father); Kayanohime (mother)
- Spouse: Susanoo
- Children: Toshigami, Ukanomitama

Kamu Ōichihime (Japanese: 神大市比売; "Divine-Princess-of-Great-Majesty") is a female Japanese deity (kami) said to be the daughter of Ōyamatsumi and Kayanohime, and have given birth to Ukanomitama and Toshigami, fathered by Susanoo.
