= Susanoo-no-Mikoto =

Shinto god

- God of the sea, storms, and fields
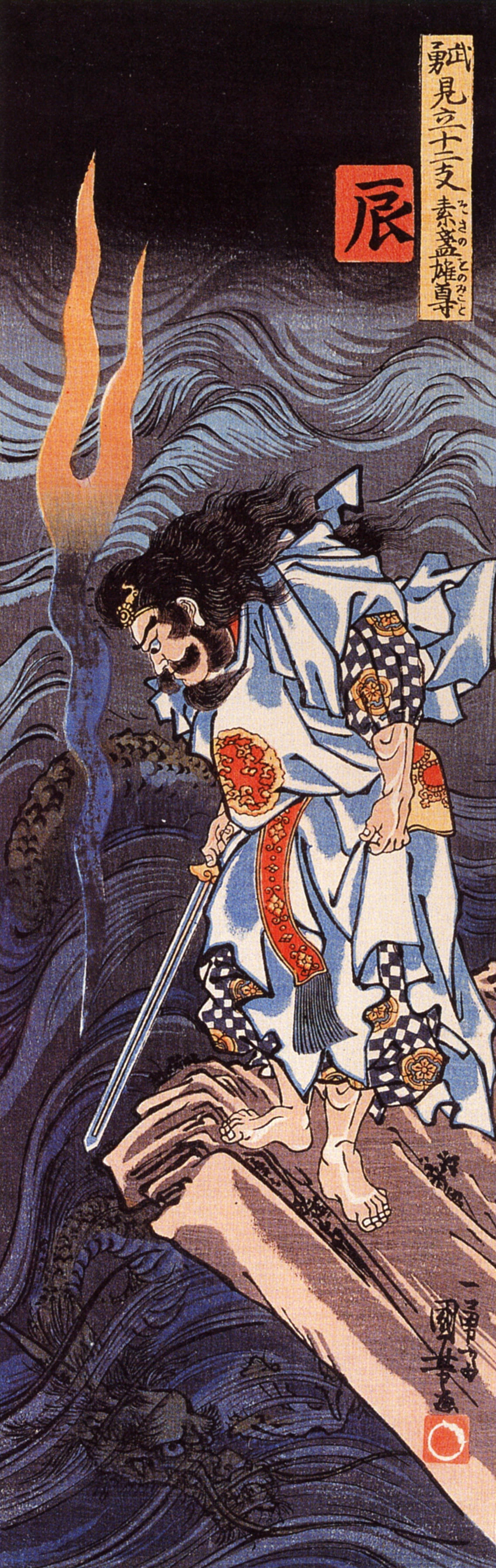
- Susanoo slaying Yamata no Orochi, woodblock print by Utagawa Kuniyoshi
- Other names: Takehaya-Susanoo-no-Mikoto (建速須佐之男命); Haya-Susanoo-no-Mikoto (速須佐之男命, 速素戔嗚尊); Take-Susanoo-no-Mikoto (武素戔嗚尊); Kamu-Susanoo-no-Mikoto (神素戔嗚尊, 神須佐能袁命); Kushimikenu-no-Mikoto (櫛御気野命); Mutō-no-Kami (武塔神); Gozu Tennō (牛頭天王)
- Japanese: 須佐之男命, 素戔嗚尊, 素盞嗚尊, 須佐乃袁尊, 須佐能乎命
- Major cult center: Susa Shrine; Yaegaki Shrine; Suga Shrine; Kumano Taisha; Susanoo Shrine; Hikawa Shrine; Yasaka Shrine; Hiromine Shrine; Tsushima Shrine
- Texts: Kojiki; Nihon Shoki; Izumo Fudoki; Sendai Kuji Hongi

Genealogy
- Parents: Izanagi (Kojiki); Izanagi and Izanami (Nihon Shoki)
- Siblings: Amaterasu; Tsukuyomi; (and others)
- Consort: Kushinadahime; Kamuōichihime; Samirahime
- Children: Munakata goddesses; Ōtoshi; Ukanomitama; (and others)

Susanoo (スサノオ; Japanese pronunciation: [sɨ̥.sä́.nó̞ò̞]; historical orthography: スサノヲ, 'Susanowo'), often referred to by the honorific title Susanoo-no-Mikoto ([sɨ̥.sä́.nó̞ò̞ nò̞ mʲì.kò̞.tò̞]), is a kami in Japanese mythology. The younger brother of Amaterasu, goddess of the sun and mythical ancestress of the Japanese imperial line, he is a multifaceted deity with contradictory characteristics, being portrayed in various stories either as a wild, impetuous god associated with the sea and storms, as a heroic figure who killed a monstrous serpent, or as a local deity linked with the harvest and agriculture. Syncretic beliefs of the Gion cult that arose after the introduction of Buddhism to Japan also saw Susanoo becoming conflated with deities of pestilence and disease.

Susanoo, alongside Amaterasu and the earthly kami Ōkuninushi (also Ōnamuchi) – depicted as either Susanoo's son or scion depending on the source – is one of the central deities of the imperial Japanese mythological cycle recorded in the Kojiki (c. 712 CE) and the Nihon Shoki (720 CE). One of the gazetteer reports (Fudoki) commissioned by the imperial court during the same period these texts were written, that of Izumo Province (modern Shimane Prefecture) in western Japan, also contains a number of short legends concerning Susanoo or his children, suggesting a connection between the god and this region.

== Name ==
Susanoo's name is variously given in the Kojiki as 'Takehaya-Susanoo-no-Mikoto' (建速須佐之男命), 'Haya-Susanoo-no-Mikoto' (速須佐之男命), or simply as 'Susanoo-no-Mikoto' (須佐之男命). -no-Mikoto is a common honorific appended to the names of Japanese gods; it may be understood as similar to the English honorific 'the Great'. He is meanwhile named in the Nihon Shoki as 'Susanoo-no-Mikoto' (素戔嗚尊), 'Kamu-Susanoo-no-Mikoto' (神素戔嗚尊), 'Haya-Susanoo-no-Mikoto' (速素戔嗚尊), and 'Take-Susanoo-no-Mikoto' (武素戔嗚尊). The Fudoki of Izumo Province renders his name both as 'Kamu-Susanoo-no-Mikoto' (神須佐能袁命) and 'Susanoo-no-Mikoto' (須佐能乎命). In these texts the following honorific prefixes are attached to his name: take- (建/武, "brave"), haya- (速, "swift"), and kamu- (神, "divine").

The susa in Susanoo's name has been variously explained as being derived from either of the following words:

- The verb susabu or susamu meaning 'to be impetuous,' 'to be violent,' or 'to go wild'
- The verb susumu, 'to advance'
- The township of Susa (須佐郷) in Iishi District, Izumo Province (modern Shimane Prefecture)
- A word related to the Middle Korean 'susung', meaning 'master' or 'shaman'

== Mythology ==
=== Parentage ===
The Kojiki (c. 712 CE) and the Nihon Shoki (720 CE) both agree in their description of Susanoo as the son of the god Izanagi and the younger brother of Amaterasu, the goddess of the sun, and of Tsukuyomi, the god of the moon. The circumstances surrounding the birth of these three deities, collectively known as the "Three Precious Children" (三貴子, Mihashira-no-Uzunomiko, Sankishi), however, vary between sources.

- In the Kojiki, Amaterasu, Tsukuyomi, and Susanoo came into existence when Izanagi bathed in a river to purify himself after visiting Yomi, the underworld, in a failed attempt to rescue his deceased wife, Izanami. Amaterasu was born when Izanagi washed his left eye, Tsukuyomi was born when he washed his right eye, and Susanoo was born when he washed his nose. Izanagi then appoints Amaterasu to rule Takamagahara (高天原, the "Plain of High Heaven"), Tsukuyomi the night, and Susanoo the seas. Susanoo, who missed his mother, kept crying and howling incessantly until his beard grew long, causing the mountains to wither and the rivers to dry up. An angry Izanagi then "expelled him with a divine expulsion."
- The main narrative of the Nihon Shoki has Izanagi and Izanami procreating after creating the Japanese archipelago; to them were born (in the following order) Amaterasu, Tsukuyomi, the 'leech-child' Hiruko, and Susanoo. Amaterasu and Tsukuyomi were sent up to heaven to govern it, while Hiruko – who even at the age of three could not stand upright – was placed on the 'Rock-Camphor Boat of Heaven' (天磐櫲樟船, Ame-no-Iwakusufune) and set adrift. Susanoo, whose wailing laid waste to the land, was expelled and sent to the netherworld (Ne-no-Kuni). (In the Kojiki, Hiruko is the couple's very first offspring, born before the islands of Japan and the other deities were created; there he is set afloat on a boat of reeds.)
- A variant legend recorded in the Shoki has Izanagi begetting Amaterasu by holding a bronze mirror in his left hand, Tsukuyomi by holding another mirror in his right hand, and Susanoo by turning his head and looking sideways. Susanoo is here also said to be banished by Izanagi due to his destructive nature.
- A third variant in the Shoki has Izanagi and Izanami begetting Amaterasu, Tsukuyomi, Hiruko, and Susanoo, as in the main narrative. This version specifies the Rock-Camphor Boat on which Hiruko was placed in to be the couple's fourth offspring. The fifth child, the fire god Kagutsuchi, caused the death of Izanami (as in the Kojiki). As in other versions, Susanoo – who "was of a wicked nature, and was always fond of wailing and wrath" – is here expelled by his parents.

=== Susanoo and Amaterasu ===
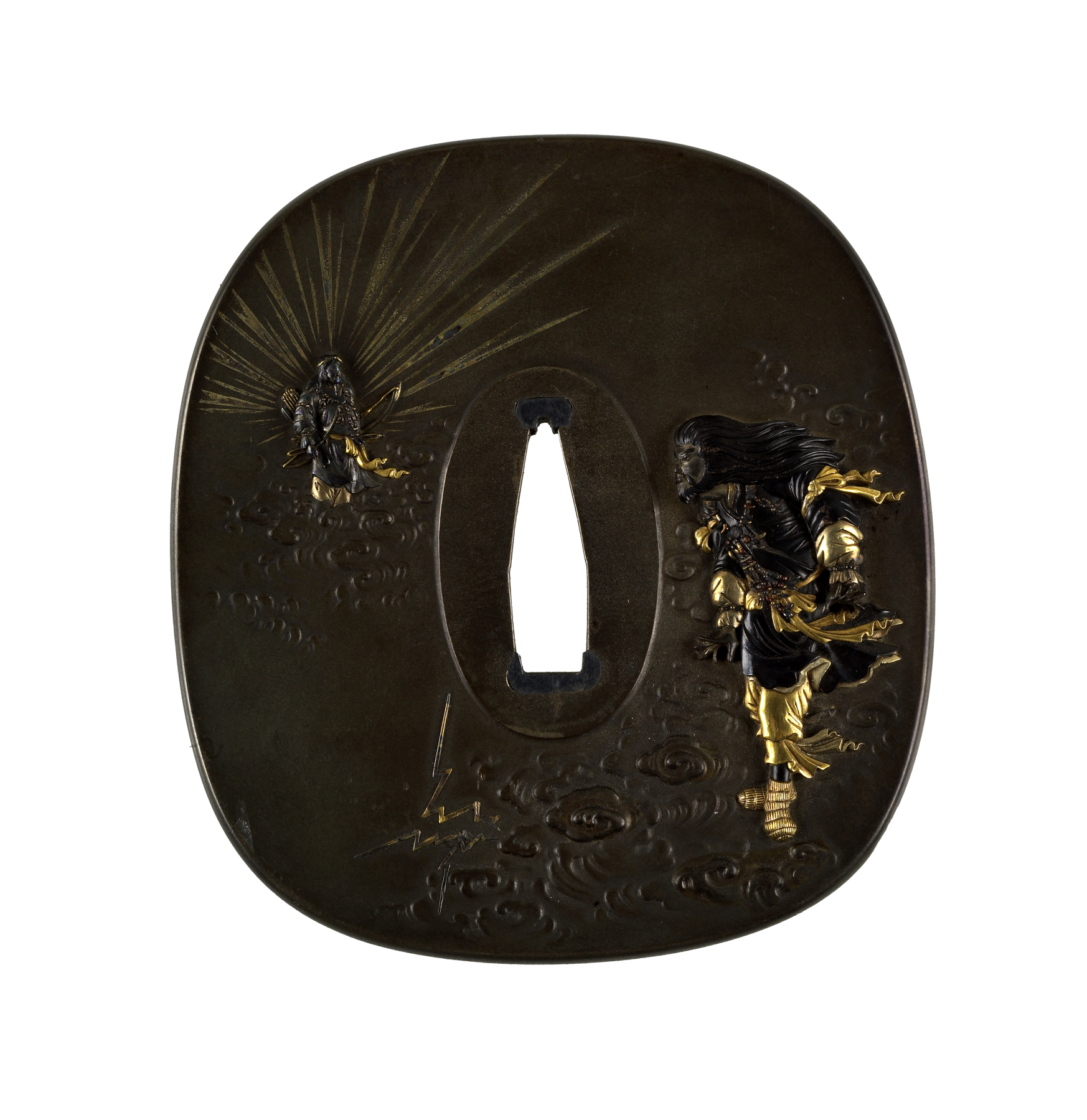
Sword guard (tsuba) depicting Susanoo meeting Amaterasu in Takamagahara

Before Susanoo leaves, he ascends to Takamagahara, wishing to say farewell to his sister Amaterasu. As he did so, the mountains and rivers shook and the land quaked. Amaterasu, suspicious of his motives, went out to meet him dressed in male clothing and clad in armor, but when Susanoo proposed a trial by pledge (ukehi) to prove his sincerity, she accepted. In the ritual, the two gods each chewed and spat out an object carried by the other (in some variants, an item they each possessed).

- Both the Kojiki and the Nihon Shoki's main account relate that Amaterasu broke Susanoo's ten-span sword (十拳剣 / 十握剣, totsuka no tsurugi) into three, chewed them and then spat them out. Three goddesses – Takiribime (Tagorihime), Ichikishimahime, and Tagitsuhime – were thus born. Susanoo then took the strings of magatama beads Amaterasu entwined in her hair and round her wrists, likewise chewed the beads and spat them out. Five male deities – Ame-no-Oshihomimi, Ame-no-Hohi, Amatsuhikone, Ikutsuhikone, and Kumano-no-Kusubi – then came into existence.
- A variant account in the Nihon Shoki has Amaterasu chew three different swords she bore with her – a ten-span sword, a nine-span sword (九握剣, kokonotsuka no tsurugi), and an eight-span sword (八握剣, yatsuka no tsurugi) – while Susanoo chewed the magatama necklace that hung on his neck.
- Another variant account in the Shoki has Susanoo meet a kami named Ha'akarutama (羽明玉) on his way to heaven. This deity presented him with the magatama beads used in the ritual. In this version, Amaterasu begets the three goddesses after chewing the magatama beads Susanoo obtained earlier, while Susanoo begets the five gods after biting off the edge of Amaterasu's sword.
- A third variant has Amaterasu chewing three different swords to beget the three goddesses as in the first variant. Susanoo, in turn, begat six male deities after chewing the magatama beads on his hair bunches and necklace and spitting them on his hands, forearms, and legs.

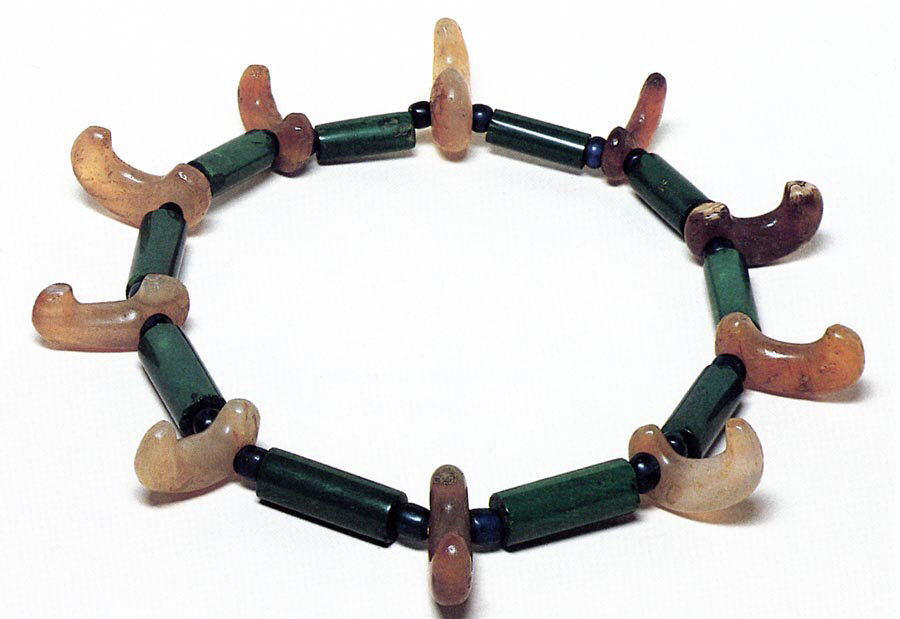
Necklace of magatama beads

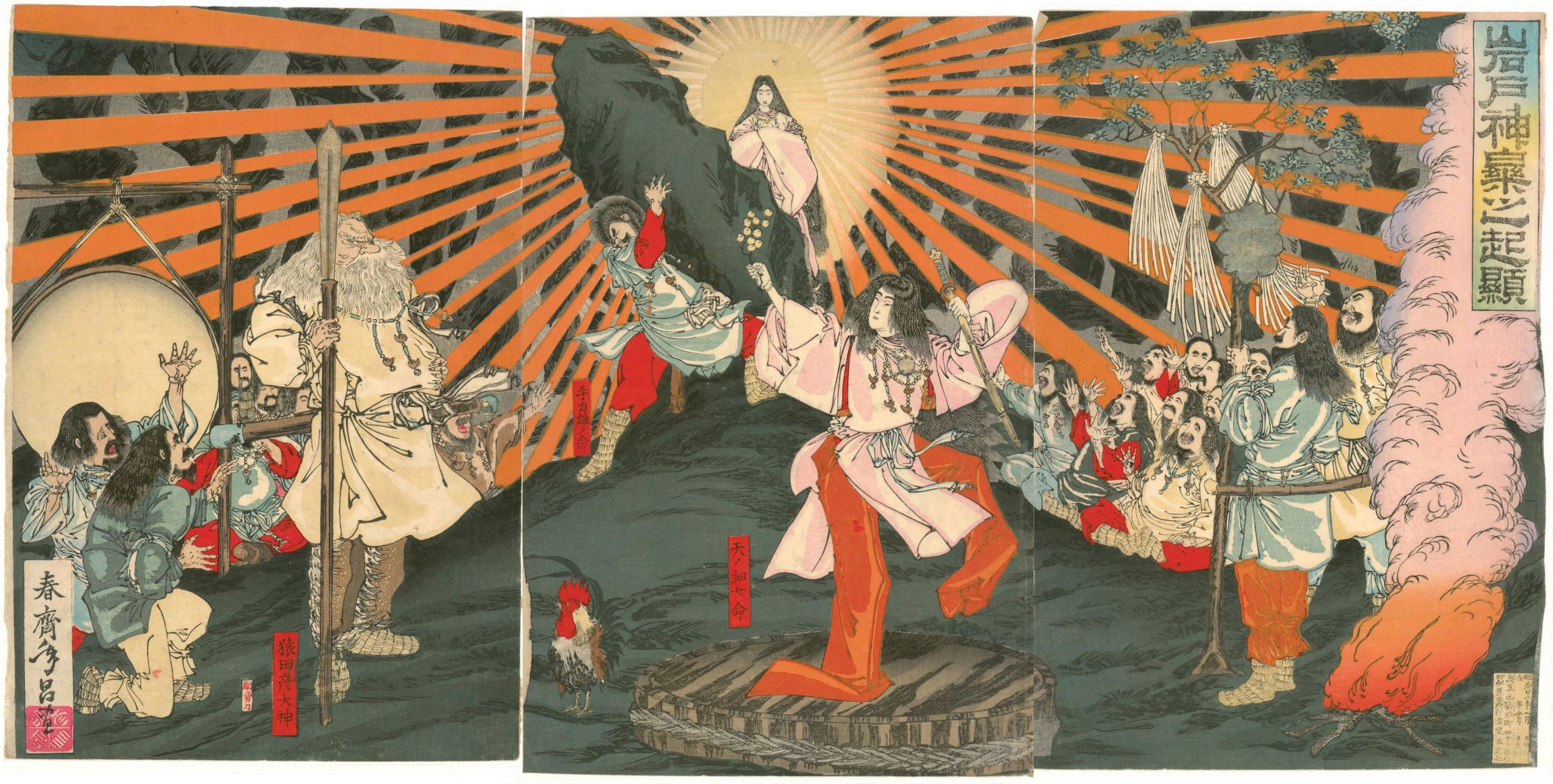
Amaterasu emerges from the Heavenly Rock Cave (Shunsai Toshimasa, 1887)

Amaterasu declares that the male deities were hers because they were born of her necklace, and that the three goddesses were Susanoo's. Susanoo, announcing that he had won the trial, (Note: Because (A) in the Kojiki, the children borne by Amaterasu but fathered by him were female; or (B) in the Shoki, the children borne by him but mothered by Amaterasu were male.) thus signifying the purity of his intentions, "raged with victory" and proceeded to wreak havoc by destroying his sister's rice fields, defecating in her palace and flaying the 'heavenly piebald horse' (天斑駒, ame-no-fuchikoma), which he then hurled at Amaterasu's loom, killing one of her weaving maidens. A furious Amaterasu in response hid inside the Ama-no-Iwato ("Heavenly Rock Cave"), plunging heaven and earth into total darkness. The gods, led by Omoikane-no-Kami (思金神), eventually persuade her to come out of the cave, restoring light to the world. As punishment for his misdeeds, Susanoo is thrown out of Takamagahara:

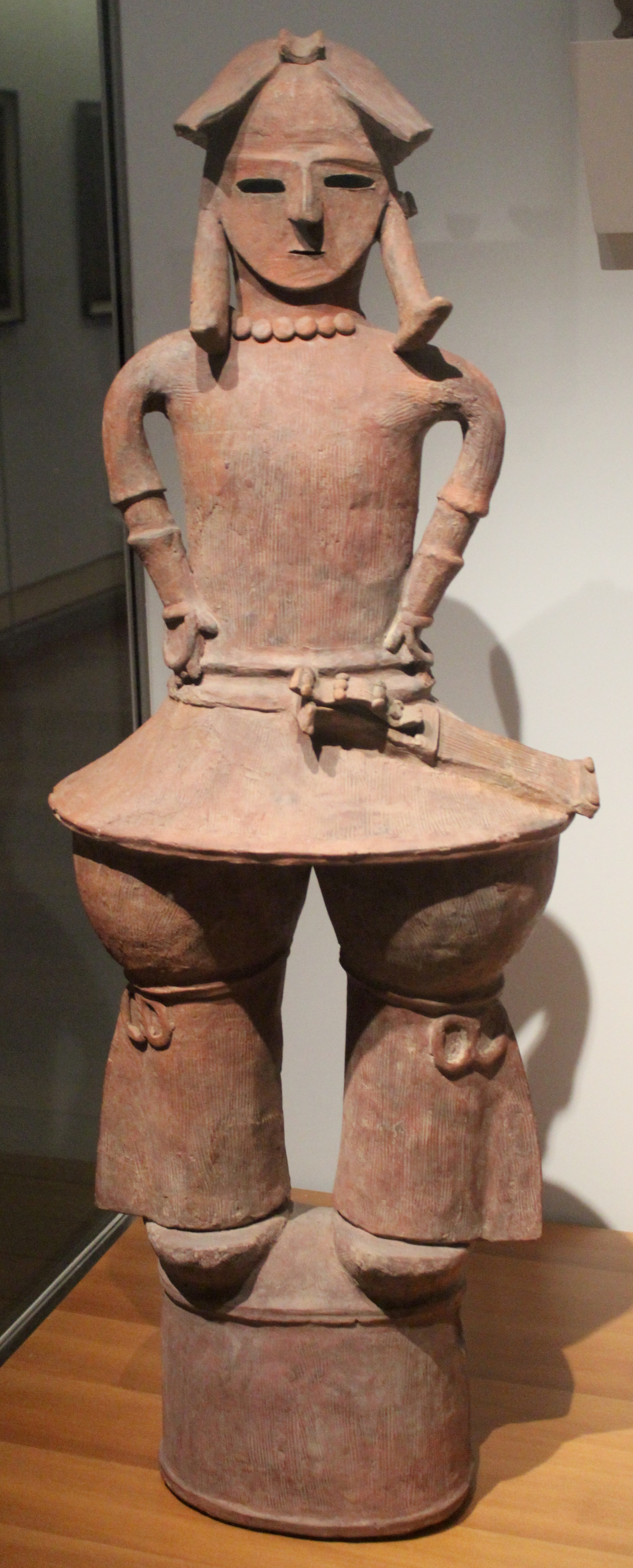
6th century (Kofun period) Haniwa depicting a warrior wearing the male mizura hairstyle, in which the hair is parted into two bunches or loops

At this time the eight-hundred myriad deities deliberated together, imposed upon Haya-Susanoo-no-Mikoto a fine of a thousand tables of restitutive gifts, and also, cutting off his beard and the nails of his hands and feet, had him exorcised and expelled him with a divine expulsion.

- A fourth variant of the story in the Shoki reverses the order of the two events. This version relates that Susanoo and Amaterasu each owned three rice fields; Amaterasu's fields were fertile, while Susanoo's were dry and barren. Driven by jealousy, Susanoo ruins his sister's rice fields, causing her to hide in the Ama-no-Iwato and him to be expelled from heaven (as above). During his banishment, Susanoo, wearing a hat and a raincoat made of straw, sought shelter from the heavy rains, but the other gods refused to give him lodging. He then ascends to heaven once more to say farewell to Amaterasu.

After this, Sosa no wo no Mikoto said:—'All the Gods have banished me, and I am now about to depart for ever. Why should I not see my elder sister face to face; and why take it on me of my own accord to depart without more ado?' So he again ascended to Heaven, disturbing Heaven and disturbing Earth. Now Ame no Uzume, seeing this, reported it to the Sun-Goddess. The Sun-Goddess said:—'My younger brother has no good purpose in coming up. It is surely because he wishes to rob me of my kingdom. Though I am a woman, why should I shrink?' So she arrayed herself in martial garb, etc., etc.
Thereupon Sosa no wo no Mikoto swore to her, and said:—'If I have come up again cherishing evil feelings, the children which I shall now produce by chewing jewels will certainly be females, and in that case they must be sent down to the Central Land of Reed-Plains. But if my intentions are pure, then I shall produce male children, and in that case they must be made to rule the Heavens. The same oath will also hold good as to the children produced by my elder sister.'

The two then perform the ukehi ritual; Susanoo produces six male deities from the magatama beads on his hair knots. Declaring that his intentions were indeed pure, Susanoo gives the six gods to Amaterasu's care and departs.

| | Kojiki | Nihon Shoki (main text) | Nihon Shoki (variant 1) | Nihon Shoki (variant 2) | Nihon Shoki (variant 3) | Nihon Shoki (variant 4) |
|---|---|---|---|---|---|---|
| Goddesses (in order) | 1. Takiribime-no-Mikoto; (多紀理毘売命); 2. Ichikishimahime-no-Mikoto (市寸島比売命); 3. Tagitsuhime-no-Mikoto (多岐都比売命) | 1. Tagorihime; (田心姫); 2. Tagitsuhime (湍津姫); 3. Ichikishimahime (市杵嶋姫) | 1. Okitsushimahime; (瀛津島姫); 2. Tagitsuhime; 3. Tagorihime | 1. Ichikishimahime-no-Mikoto; 2. Tagorihime-no-Mikoto; 3. Tagitsuhime-no-Mikoto | 1. Okitsushimahime-no-Mikoto, a.k.a. Ichikishimahime-no-Mikoto; 2. Tagitsuhime-no-Mikoto; 3. Tagirihime-no-Mikoto; (田霧姫命) | - |
| Born when Amaterasu | Broke Susanoo's ten-span sword into three and chewed them | Broke Susanoo's ten-span sword into three and chewed them | 1. Ate her ten-span sword 2. Ate her nine-span sword 3. Ate her eight-span sword | 1. Bit off the upper part of Susanoo's magatama beads 2. Bit off the middle part of the beads 3. Bit off the lower part of the beads | 1. Ate her ten-span sword 2. Ate her nine-span sword 4. Ate her eight-span sword | Ate her ten-span sword |
| Gods (in order) | 1. Masakatsu-Akatsu-Kachihayahi-Ame-no-Oshihomimi-no-Mikoto; (正勝吾勝勝速日天之忍穂耳命); 2. Ame-no-Hohi-no-Mikoto (天之菩卑能命); 3. Amatsuhikone-no-Mikoto (天津日子根命); 4. Ikutsuhikone-no-Mikoto (活津日子根命); 5. Kumano-no-Kusubi-no-Mikoto (熊野久須毘命) | 1. Masaka-Akatsu-Kachihayahi-Ame-no-Oshihomimi-no-Mikoto; (正哉吾勝勝速日天忍穂耳尊); 2. Ame-no-Hohi-no-Mikoto (天穂日命); 3. Amatsuhikone-no-Mikoto (天津彦根命); 4. Ikutsuhikone-no-Mikoto (活津彦根命); 5. Kumano-no-Kusuhi-no-Mikoto (熊野櫲樟日命) | 1. Masaka-Akatsu-Kachihayahi-Ame-no-Oshihone-no-Mikoto; (正哉吾勝勝速日天忍骨尊); 2. Amatsuhikone-no-Mikoto; 3. Ikutsuhikone-no-Mikoto; 4. Ame-no-Hohi-no-Mikoto; 5. Kumano-no-Oshihomi-no-Mikoto (熊野忍蹈命) | 1. Ame-no-Hohi-no-Mikoto; 2. Masaka-Akatsu-Kachihayahi-Ame-no-Oshihone-no-Mikoto; 3. Amatsuhikone-no-Mikoto; 4. Ikutsuhikone-no-Mikoto; 5. Kumano-no-Kusuhi-no-Mikoto | 1. Kachihayahi-Ame-no-Oshihomimi-no-Mikoto; (勝速日天忍穂耳尊); 2. Ame-no-Hohi-no-Mikoto; 3. Amatsuhikone-no-Mikoto; 4. Ikutsuhikone-no-Mikoto; 5. Hi-no-Hayahi-no-Mikoto (熯之速日命); 6. Kumano-no-Oshihomi-no-Mikoto, a.k.a. Kumano-no-Oshikuma-no-Mikoto (熊野忍蹈命, 熊野忍隅命) | 1. Masaka-Akatsu-Kachihayahi-Ame-no-Oshihone-no-Mikoto; (正哉吾勝勝速日天忍穂根尊); 2. Ame-no-Hohi-no-Mikoto; 3. Amatsuhikone-no-Mikoto; 4. Ikumetsuhikone-no-Mikoto (活目津彥根命); 5. Hihayahi-no-Mikoto (熯速日命); 6. Kumano-no-Ōsumi-no-Mikoto (熊野大角命) |
| Born when Susanoo | 1. Chewed the strings of magatama beads entwined in Amaterasu's left hair bunch 2. Chewed the beads entwined in Amaterasu's right hair bunch 3. Chewed the beads on the vine securing her hair 4. Chewed the beads wrapped around Amaterasu's left wrist 5. Chewed the beads wrapped around Amaterasu's right wrist | Chewed the strings of magatama beads entwined in Amaterasu's hair and wrists | Chewed his necklace of magatama beads | Bit off the end of Amaterasu's sword | 1. Chewed the magatama beads entwined in his left hair bunch and spat them on the palm of his left hand 2. Chewed the beads entwined in his right hair bunch and spat them on the palm of his right hand 3. Chewed the beads of his necklace and laid them on his left forearm 4. Laid the beads on his right forearm 5. Laid the beads on his left foot 6. Laid the beads on his right foot | 1. Chewed the magatama beads entwined in his right hair bunch and laid them on the palm of his left hand 2. Chewed the beads entwined in his right hair bunch and laid them on the palm of his right hand |

=== Susanoo and Ōgetsuhime ===
The Kojiki relates that during his banishment, Susanoo asked the goddess of food, Ōgetsuhime-no-Kami (大気都比売神), to give him something to eat. Upon finding out that the goddess produced foodstuffs from her mouth, nose, and rectum, a disgusted Susanoo killed her, at which various crops, plants and seeds spring from her dead body. This account is not found in the Nihon Shoki, where a similar story is told of Tsukuyomi and the goddess Ukemochi.

=== Slaying the Yamata no Orochi ===
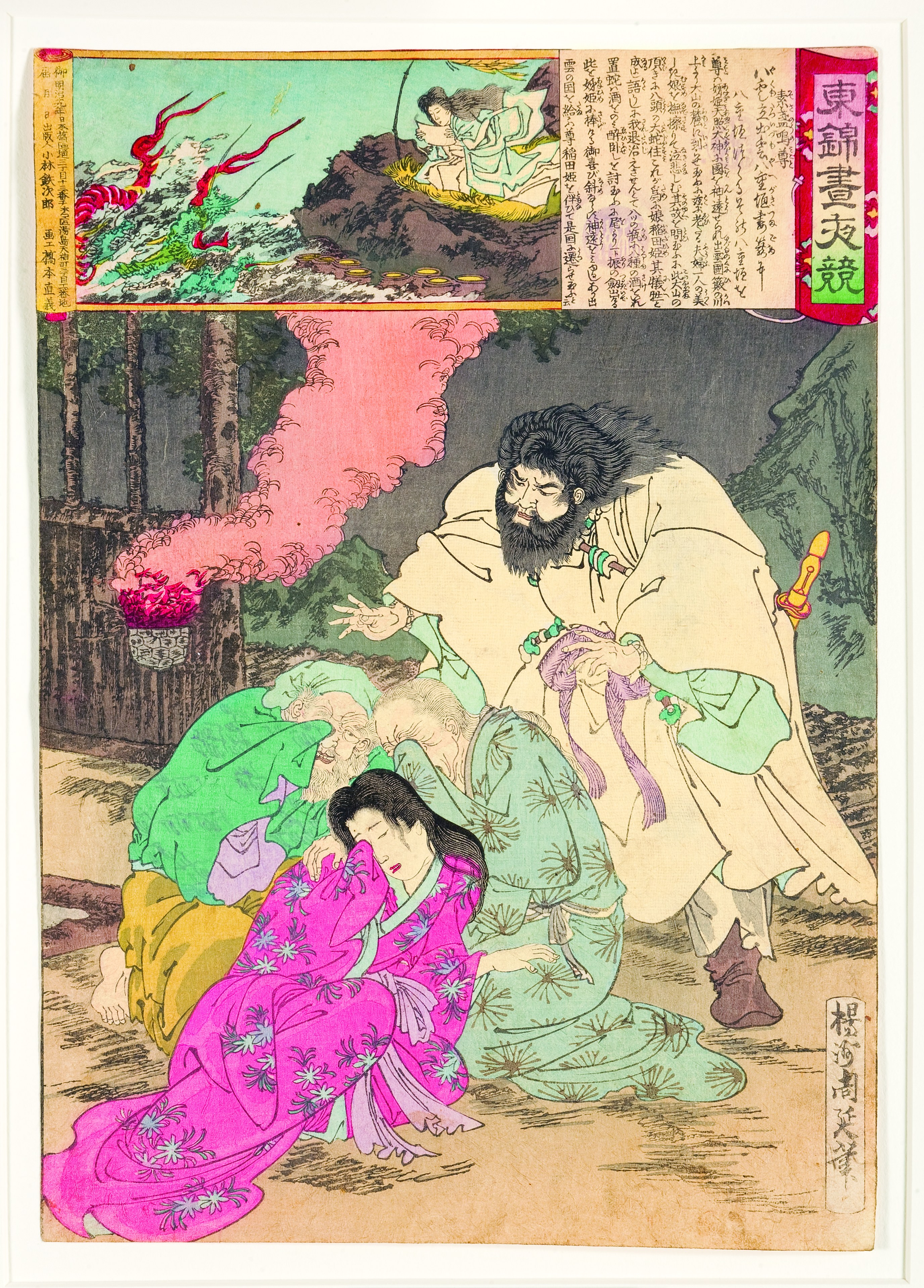
Susanoo rescues Kushinada Hime (Toyohara Chikanobu)

After his banishment, Susanoo came down from heaven to Ashihara-no-Nakatsukuni (葦原中国, the 'Central Land of Reed Plains', i.e. the earthly land of Japan), to the land of Izumo, where he met an elderly couple named Ashinazuchi (足名椎 / 脚摩乳) and Tenazuchi (手名椎 / 手摩乳), who told him that seven of their eight daughters had been devoured by a monstrous serpent known as the Yamata no Orochi (八俣遠呂智 / 八岐大蛇, "eight-forked serpent") and it was nearing time for their eighth, Kushinadahime (櫛名田比売; also called Kushiinadahime, Inadahime, or Makami-Furu-Kushiinadahime in the Shoki).

Sympathizing with their plight, Susanoo hid Kushinadahime by transforming her into a comb (kushi), which he placed in his hair. He then made the serpent drunk on strong sake and then killed it as it lay in a drunken stupor. From within the serpent's tail Susanoo discovered the sword Ame-no-Murakumo-no-Tsurugi (天叢雲剣, "Sword of the Gathering Clouds of Heaven"), also known as Kusanagi-no-Tsurugi (草薙剣, "Grass-Cutting Sword"), which he then presented to Amaterasu as a reconciliatory gift.

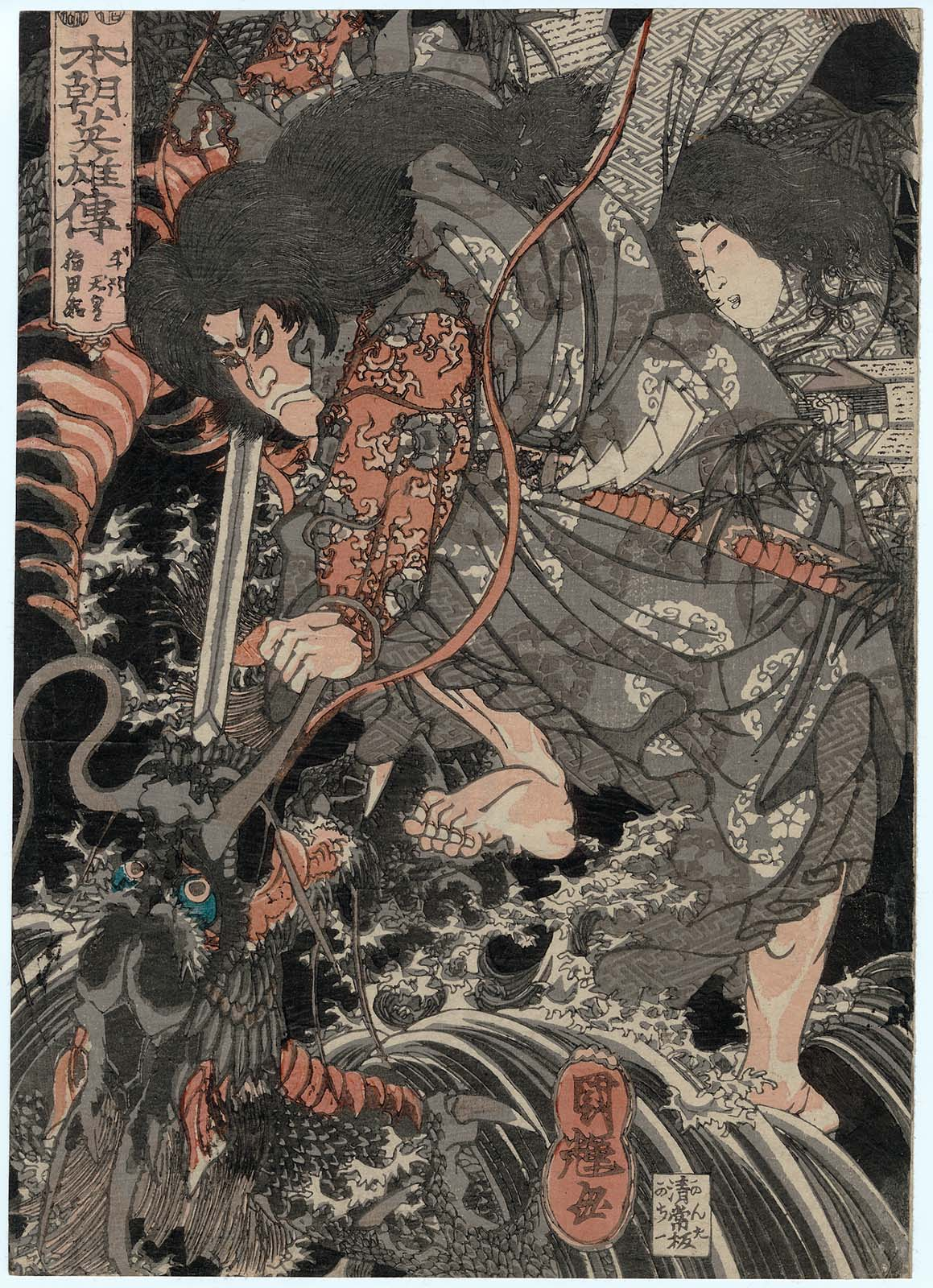
Susanoo kills the Yamata no Orochi (Utagawa Kuniteru)

[Susanoo-no-Mikoto] said to Ashinazuchi and Tenazuchi-no-Kami:

"Distill thick wine of eight-fold brewings; build a fence, and make eight doors in the fence. At each door, tie together eight platforms, and on each of these platforms place a wine barrel. Fill each barrel with the thick wine of eight-fold brewings, and wait."
They made the preparations as he had instructed, and as they waited, the eight-tailed dragon came indeed, as [the old man] had said.
Putting one head into each of the barrels, he drank the wine; then, becoming drunk, he lay down and slept.
Then Haya-Susanoo-no-Mikoto unsheathed the sword ten hands long which he was wearing at his side, and hacked the dragon to pieces, so that the Hi river ran with blood.
When he cut [the dragon's] middle tail, the blade of his sword broke. Thinking this strange, he thrust deeper with the stub of his sword, until a great sharp sword appeared.
He took this sword out and, thinking it an extraordinary thing, reported [the matter] and presented [the sword] to Amaterasu-Ōmikami.

This is the sword Kusa-nagi.

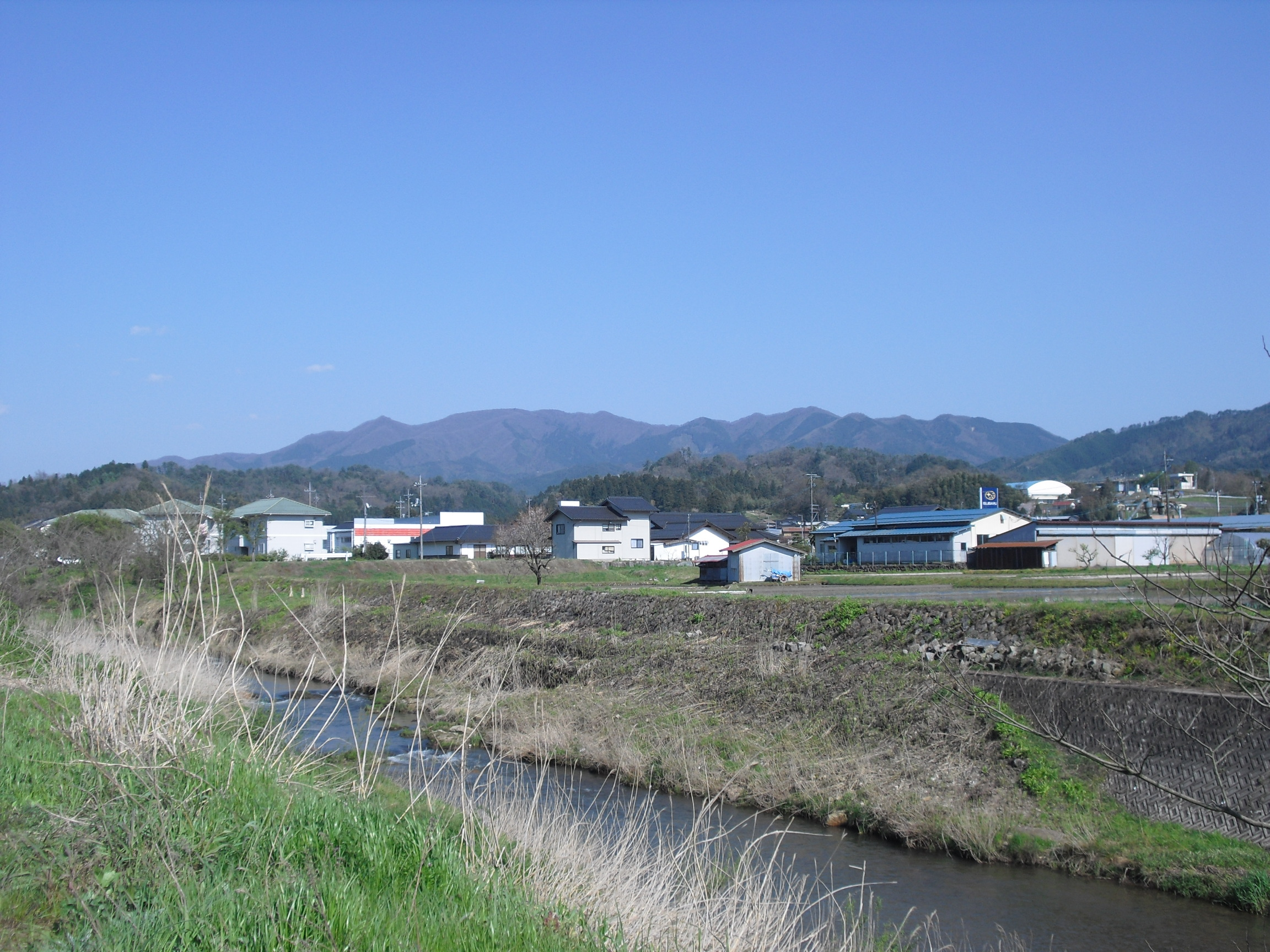
Mount Sentsū as seen from Okuizumo with the Hii River in the foreground

Amaterasu later bequeathed the sword to Ninigi, her grandson by Ame-no-Oshihomimi, along with the mirror Yata no Kagami and the jewel Yasakani no Magatama. This sacred sword, mirror, and jewel collectively became the three Imperial Regalia of Japan.

While most accounts place Susanoo's descent in the headwaters of the river Hi in Izumo (肥河 / 簸之川, Hi-no-Kawa, identified with the Hii River in modern Shimane Prefecture), with the Kojiki specifying the area to be a place called Torikami (鳥髮, identified with Mount Sentsū in eastern Shimane), one variant in the Shoki instead has Susanoo descend to the upper reaches of the river E (可愛之川, E-no-kawa) in the province of Aki (identified with the Gōnokawa River in modern Hiroshima Prefecture). Kushinadahime's parents are here given the names Ashinazu-Tenazu (脚摩手摩) and Inada-no-Miyanushi-Susa-no-Yatsumimi (稲田宮主簀狭之八箇耳); here, Kushinadahime is not yet born when Susanoo slew the Yamata no Orochi.

The ten-span sword Susanoo used to slay the Yamata no Orochi, unnamed in the Kojiki and the Shoki's main text, is variously named in the Shoki's variants as Orochi-no-Aramasa (蛇之麁正, 'Rough [and] True [Blade] of the Serpent'), Orochi-no-Karasabi-no-Tsurugi (蛇韓鋤之剣, 'Korean (Kara) Sword of the Serpent' or 'Flashing Sword of the Serpent'), and Ame-no-Haekiri-no-Tsurugi (天蝿斫剣, 'Heavenly Fly Cutter', also Ame-no-Hahakiri 'Heavenly Serpent (haha) Cutter'). In the Kogo Shūi it is dubbed Ame-no-Habakiri (天羽々斬, also Ame-no-Hahakiri). This sword is said to have been originally enshrined in Isonokami Futsumitama Shrine in Bizen Province (modern Okayama Prefecture) before it was transferred to Isonokami Shrine in Yamato Province (modern Nara Prefecture).

=== Susanoo in Soshimori ===
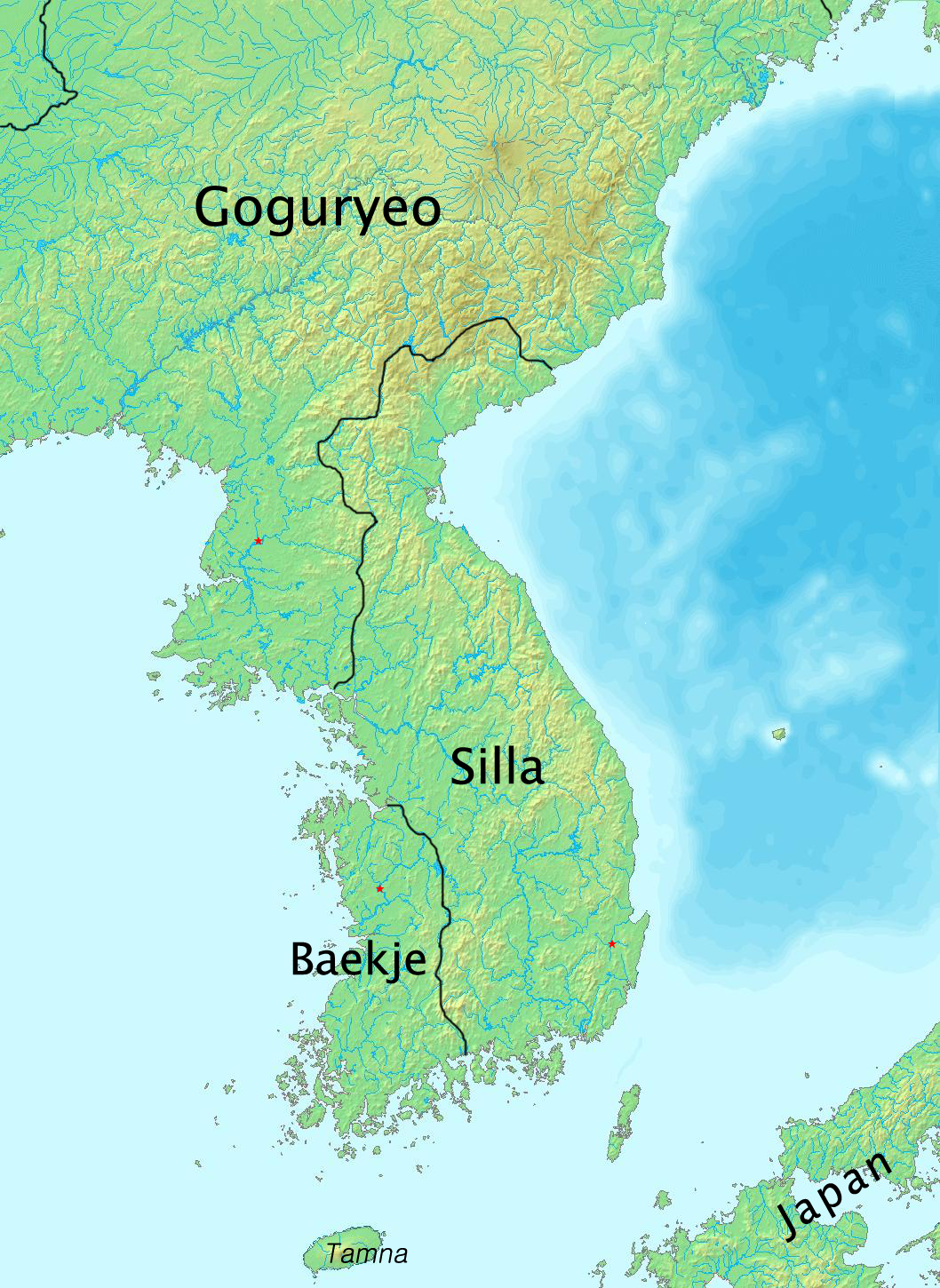
Pre-Later Silla at its height in 576

A variant account in the Shoki relates that after Susanoo was banished due to his bad behavior, he descended from heaven, accompanied by a son named Isotakeru-no-Mikoto (五十猛命), to a place called 'Soshimori' (曽尸茂梨) in the land of Shiragi (the Korean kingdom of Silla) before going to Izumo. Disliking the place, they crossed the sea in a boat made of clay until they arrived at Torikami Peak (鳥上之峯, Torikami no mine) by the upper waters of the river Hi in Izumo.

=== The palace of Suga ===
After slaying the Yamata no Orochi, Susanoo looked for a suitable place in Izumo to live in. Upon arriving at a place called Suga (須賀 / 清), he declared, "Coming to this place, my heart is refreshed (sugasugashi)." He then erected a palace there and made a song:

Man'yogana (Kojiki): 夜久毛多都 伊豆毛夜幣賀岐 都麻碁微爾 夜幣賀岐都久流 曾能夜幣賀岐袁

Old Japanese: yakumo_{1} tatu / idumo_{1} yape_{1}gaki_{1} / tumago_{2}mi_{2} ni / yape_{1}gaki_{1} tukuru / so_{2}no_{2} yape_{1}gaki_{1} wo

Modern Japanese: yakumo tatsu / izumo yaegaki / tsumagomi ni / yaegaki tsukuru / sono yaegaki o

Donald L. Philippi (1968) translates the song into English thus:

The many-fenced palace of IDUMO

Of the many clouds rising—
To dwell there with my spouse
Do I build a many-fenced palace:

Ah, that many-fenced palace!

The Kojiki adds that Susanoo appointed Kushinadahime's father Ashinazuchi to be the headman of his new dwelling, bestowing upon him the name Inada-no-Miyanushi-Suga-no-Yatsumimi-no-Kami (稲田宮主須賀之八耳神, 'Master of the Palace of Inada, the Eight-Eared Deity of Suga'). With his new wife Kushinadahime, Susanoo had a child named Yashimajinumi-no-Kami (八島士奴美神). He then took another wife named Kamu-Ōichihime (神大市比売), the daughter of Ōyamatsumi, the god of mountains, and had two children by her: Ōtoshi-no-Kami (大年神), the god of the harvest, and Ukanomitama-no-Kami (宇迦之御魂神), the god of agriculture.

The Shoki's main narrative is roughly similar: Susanoo appoints Ashinazuchi and Tenazuchi to be the keepers of his palace and gives them the title Inada-no-Miyanushi. The child born to Susanoo and Kushiinadahime in this version is identified as Ōnamuchi-no-Kami (大己貴神, the Kojiki's Ōkuninushi).

After having thus lived for a time in Izumo, Susanoo at length finally found his way to Ne-no-Kuni.

=== Planting trees ===
One variant in the Shoki has Susanoo pulling out hairs from different parts of his body and turning them into different kinds of trees. Determining the use of each, he then gives them to his three children – Isotakeru-no-Mikoto, Ōyatsuhime-no-Mikoto (大屋津姫命), and Tsumatsuhime-no-Mikoto (枛津姫命) – to spread in Japan. Susanoo then settled down in a place called Kumanari-no-Take (熊成峯) before going to Ne-no-Kuni.

The myth of Susanoo's descent in Soshimori has Isotakeru bringing seeds with him from Takamagahara which he did not choose to plant in Korea but rather spread throughout Japan, beginning with Tsukushi Province. The narrative adds that it is, for this reason, why Isotakeru is styled Isaoshi-no-Kami (有功之神, 'Meritorious Deity').

=== Susanoo and Ōnamuji ===
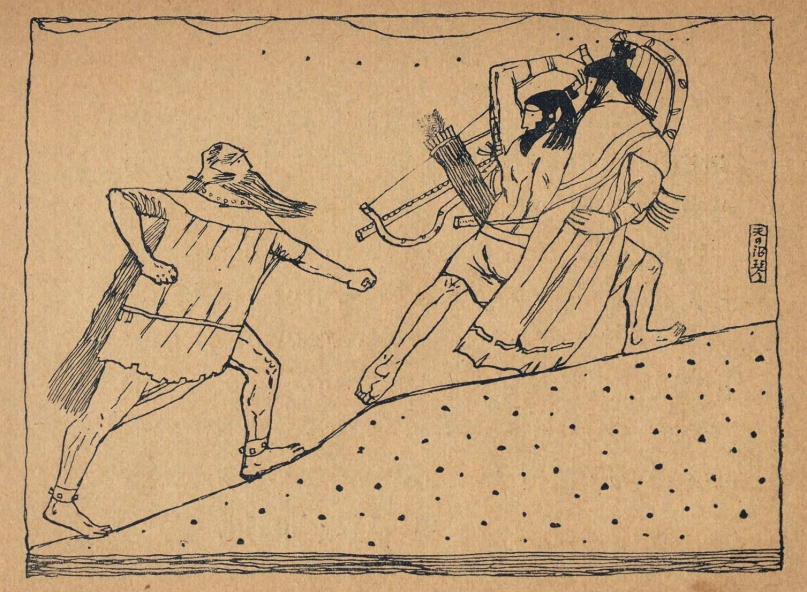
Ōnamuji (Ōkuninushi) and Suseribime escaping from Ne-no-Kuni (Natori Shunsen)

In the Kojiki, a sixth-generation descendant of Susanoo, Ōnamuji-no-Kami (大穴牟遅神), ends up in Ne-no-Kuni to escape his wicked elder brothers who make repeated attempts on his life. There he meets and falls in love with Susanoo's daughter Suseribime (須勢理毘売). Upon learning of their affair, Susanoo imposes four trials on Ōnamuji:

- Susanoo, upon inviting Ōnamuji to his dwelling, had him sleep in a chamber filled with snakes. Suseribime aided Ōnamuji by giving him a scarf that repelled the snakes.
- The following night, Susanoo had Ōnamuji sleep in another room full of centipedes and bees. Once again, Suseribime gave Ōnamuji a scarf that kept the insects at bay.
- Susanoo shot an arrow into a large plain and had Ōnamuji fetch it. As Ōnamuji was busy looking for the arrow, Susanoo set the field on fire. A field mouse showed Ōnamuji how to hide from the flames and gave him the arrow he was searching for.
- Susanoo, upon discovering that Ōnamuji had survived, summoned him back to his palace and had him pick the lice and centipedes from his hair. Using a mixture of red clay and nuts given to him by Suseribime, Ōnamuji pretended to chew and spit out the insects he was picking.

After Susanoo was lulled to sleep, Ōnamuji tied Susanoo's hair to the hall's rafters and blocked the door with an enormous boulder. Taking his new wife Suseribime as well as Susanoo's sword, koto, and bow and arrows with him, Ōnamuji thus fled the palace. The koto brushed against a tree as the two were fleeing; the sound awakens Susanoo, who, rising with a start, knocks his palace down around him. Susanoo then pursued them as far as the slopes of Yomotsu Hirasaka (黄泉比良坂, the 'Flat Slope of Yomi'). As the two departed, Susanoo grudgingly gave his blessing to Ōnamuji, advising him to change his name to Ōkuninushi-no-Kami (大国主神, "Master of the Great Land"). Using the weapons he obtained from Susanoo, Ōkuninushi defeats his brothers and becomes the undisputed ruler of Ashihara-no-Nakatsukuni.

=== Susanoo in the Izumo Fudoki ===
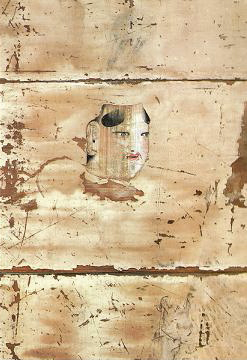
Muromachi period wall painting in Yaegaki Shrine (Matsue, Shimane Prefecture) depicting Susanoo

The Fudoki of Izumo Province (completed 733 CE) records the following etiological legends which feature Susanoo and his children:

- The township of Yasuki (安来郷) in Ou District (意宇郡) is named such after Susanoo visited the area and said, "My mind has been comforted (yasuku nari tamau)."
- The township of Ōkusa (大草郷) in Ou is said to have been named after a son of Susanoo named Aohata-Sakusahiko-no-Mikoto (青幡佐久佐比古命).
- The township of Yamaguchi (山口郷) in Shimane District (島根郡) is named as such after another son of Susanoo, Tsurugihiko-no-Mikoto (都留支日子命), declared these entrance to the hills (yamaguchi) to be his territory.
- The township of Katae (方結郷) in Shimane received its name after Kunioshiwake-no-Mikoto (国忍別命), a son of Susanoo, said, "The land I govern is in good condition geographically (kunigatae)."
- The township of Etomo (恵曇郡) in Akika District (秋鹿郡) is named such after Susanoo's son Iwasakahiko-no-Mikoto (磐坂日子命) noted the area's resemblance to a painted arm guard (画鞆, etomo).
- The township of Tada (多太郷) in Akika District received its name after Susanoo's son Tsukihoko-Tooruhiko-no-Mikoto (衝杵等乎留比古命, also Tsukiki-Tooruhiko) came there and said, "My heart has become bright and truthful (tadashi)."
- The township of Yano (八野郷) in Kando District (神門郡) is named after Susanoo's daughter Yanowakahime-no-Mikoto (八野若日女命), who lived in the area. Ōnamochi (大穴持命, i.e. Ōkuninushi), also known as Ame-no-Shita-Tsukurashishi-Ōkami (所造天下大神, 'Great Deity, Maker of All Under Heaven'), who wished to marry her, had a house built at this place.
- The township of Namesa (滑狭郷) in Kando District (神門郡) is named after a smooth stone (滑磐石, nameshi iwa) Ame-no-Shita-Tsukurashishi-Ōkami (Ōnamochi) spotted while visiting Susanoo's daughter Wakasuserihime-no-Mikoto (和加須世理比売命, the Kojiki's Suseribime), who is said to have lived there.
- The township of Susa (須佐郷) in Iishi District (飯石郡) is said to be named after Susanoo, who enshrined his spirit in this place:

Township of Susa. It is 6.3 miles west of the district office. The god Susanowo said, "Though this land is small, it is good land for me to own. I would rather have my name [associated with this land than] with rocks or trees." After saying this, he left his spirit to stay quiet at this place and established the Great Rice Field of Susa and the Small Rice Field of Susa. That is why it is called Susa. There are tax granaries in this township.

- The township of Sase (佐世郷) in Ōhara District (大原郡) is said to have gained its name when Susanoo danced there wearing leaves of a plant called sase on his head.
- Mount Mimuro (御室山, Mimuro-yama) in the township of Hi (斐伊郷) in Ōhara District is said to have been the place where Susanoo built a temporary dwelling (御室, mimuro, lit. 'noble chamber') in which he stayed the night.

=== Susanoo, Mutō Tenjin and Gozu Tennō ===
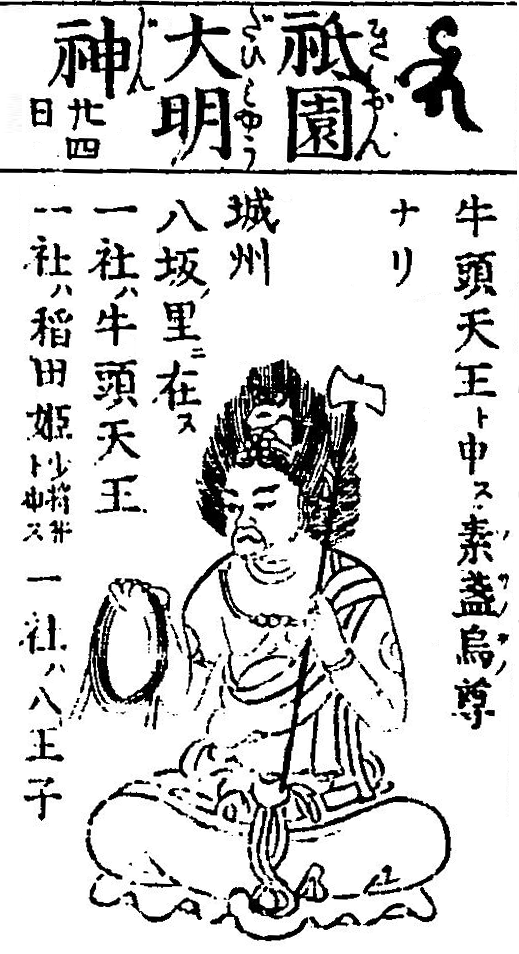
Gion Daimyōjin (Gozu Tennō) from the Butsuzōzui

The syncretic deity Gozu Tennō (牛頭天王, "Ox-Headed Heavenly King"), originally worshiped at Yasaka Shrine in Kyoto and at other shrines such as Tsushima Shrine in Aichi Prefecture, was historically conflated with Susanoo. Originally a deity of foreign import (India and Korea have all been suggested as possible origins), Gozu Tennō was widely revered since the Heian period as a god of pestilence, who both caused disease and cured them.

Gozu Tennō became associated with another deity called Mutō-no-Kami (武塔神) or Mutō Tenjin (武塔天神), who appears in the legend of Somin Shōrai (蘇民将来). This legend relates that Mutō, a god from the northern sea, embarked on a long journey to court the daughter of the god of the southern seas. On his way he sought lodging from a wealthy man, but was turned down. He then went to the home of a poor man (sometimes identified as the rich man's brother) named Somin Shōrai, who gave him food and shelter. Years later, Mutō returned and slew the rich man and his family but spared Somin Shōrai's house. Some versions of the story have Mutō repaying Somin Shōrai for his hospitality by giving the poor man's daughter a wreath of susuki (Miscanthus sinensis) reeds that she is to wear while declaring, "[I am] the descendant of Somin Shōrai" (蘇民将来之子孫也, Somin Shōrai no shison nari). By doing so, she and her descendants would be spared from pestilence. The deity in this story, Mutō, is often conflated with Gozu Tennō (who, as his name implies, was born with the head of an ox) in later retellings, though one version identifies Gozu Tennō as Mutō Tenjin's son.

The earliest known version of this legend, found in the Fudoki of Bingo Province (modern eastern Hiroshima Prefecture) compiled during the Nara period (preserved in an extract quoted by scholar and Shinto priest Urabe Kanekata in the Shaku Nihongi), has Mutō explicitly identify himself as Susanoo. This suggests that Susanoo and Mutō Tenjin were already conflated in the Nara period, if not earlier. Sources that equate Gozu Tennō with Susanoo only first appear during the Kamakura period (1185–1333), although one theory supposes that these three gods and various other disease-related deities were already loosely coalesced around the 9th century, probably around the year 877 when a major epidemic swept through Japan.

== Analysis ==
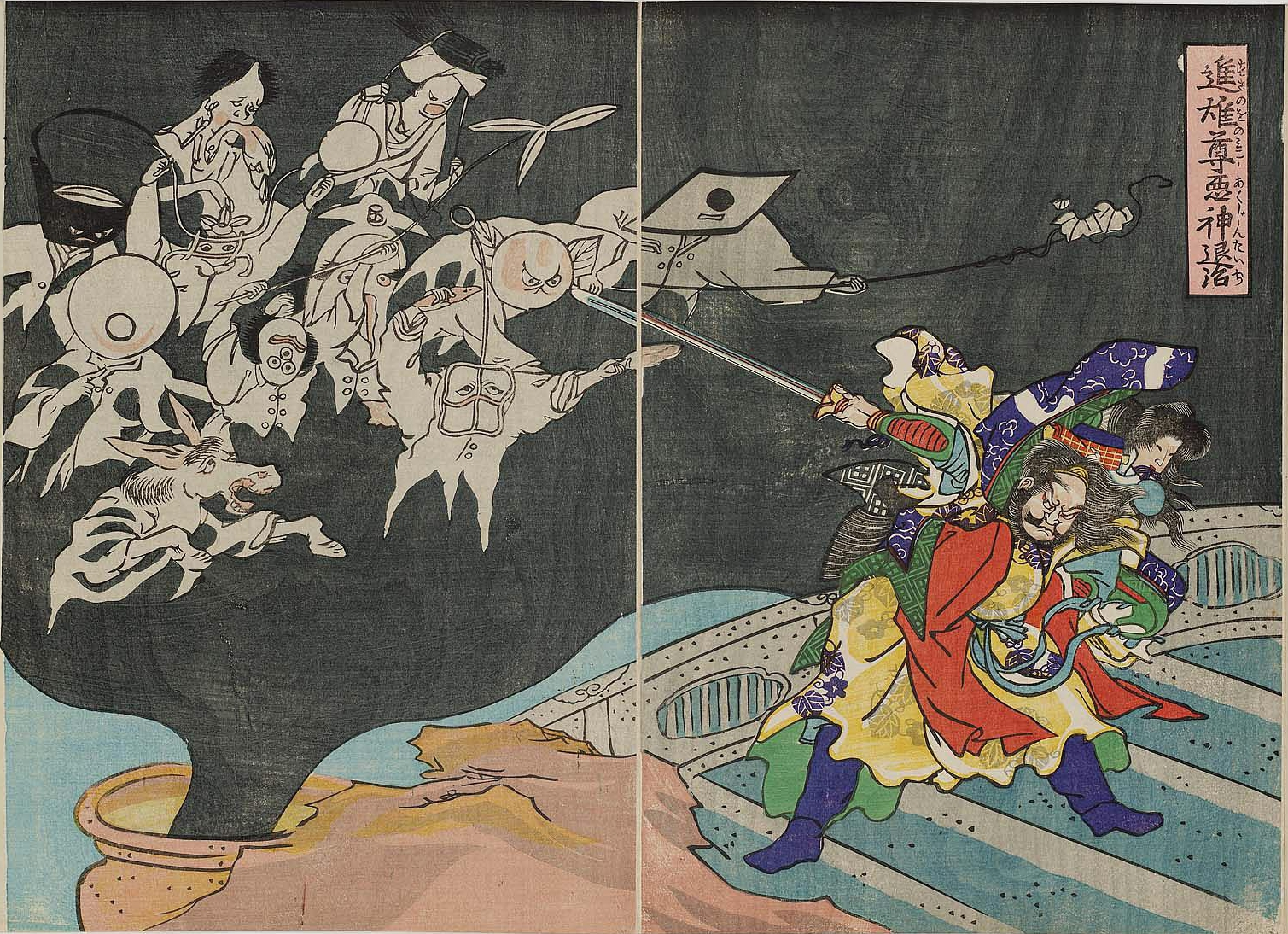
Susanoo-no-Mikoto Defeats the Evil Spirits (1868)

The image of Susanoo that can be gleaned from various texts is rather complex and contradictory. In the Kojiki and the Shoki he is portrayed first as a petulant young man, then as an unpredictable, violent boor who causes chaos and destruction before turning into a monster-slaying culture hero after descending into the world of men, while in the Izumo Fudoki, he is simply a local god apparently connected with rice fields, with almost none of the traits associated with him in the imperial mythologies being mentioned. Due to his multifaceted nature, various authors have had differing opinions regarding Susanoo's origins and original character.

The Edo period kokugaku scholar Motoori Norinaga, in his Kojiki-den (Commentary on the Kojiki), characterized Susanoo as an evil god in contrast to his elder siblings Amaterasu and Tsukuyomi, as the unclean air of the land of the dead still adhered to Izanagi's nose from which he was born and was not purified completely during Izanagi's ritual ablutions. The early 20th-century historian Tsuda Sōkichi, who put forward the then-controversial theory that the Kojiki's accounts were not based on history (as Edo period kokugaku and State Shinto ideology believed them to be) but rather propagandistic myths concocted to explain and legitimize the rule of the imperial dynasty, also saw Susanoo as a negative figure, arguing that he was created to serve as the rebellious opposite of the imperial ancestress Amaterasu. Ethnologist Ōbayashi Taryō, speaking from the standpoint of comparative mythology, opined that the stories concerning the three deities were ultimately derived from a continental (Southeast Asian) myth in which the Sun, the Moon and the Dark Star are siblings and the Dark Star plays an antagonistic role (cf. Rahu and Ketu from Hindu religion); Ōbayashi thus also interprets Susanoo as a bad hero.

Other scholars, however, take the position that Susanoo was not originally conceived of as a negative deity. Mythologist Matsumura Takeo for instance believed the Izumo Fudoki to more accurately reflect Susanoo's original character: a peaceful, simple kami of the rice fields. In Matsumura's view, Susanoo's character was deliberately reversed when he was grafted into the imperial mythology by the compilers of the Kojiki. Matsumoto Nobuhiro, in a similar vein, interpreted Susanoo as a harvest deity. While the Izumo Fudoki claims that the township of Susa in Izumo is named after its deity Susanoo, it has been proposed that the opposite might have actually been the case and Susanoo was named after the place, with his name being understood in this case as meaning "Man (o) of Susa."

While both Matsumura and Matsumoto preferred to connect Susanoo with rice fields and the harvest, Matsumae Takeshi put forward the theory that Susanoo was originally worshiped as a patron deity of sailors. Unlike other scholars who connect Susanoo with Izumo, Matsumae instead saw Kii Province (the modern prefectures of Wakayama and Mie) as the birthplace of Susanoo worship, pointing out that there was also a settlement in Kii named Susa (須佐). (In the Kojiki, Ōnamuji enters Susanoo's realm, Ne-no-Kuni, through the fork of a tree in Kii.) Matsumae proposed that the worship of Susanoo was brought to other places in Japan by seafaring peoples from Kii, a land rich in timber (the province's name is itself derived from the word ki meaning 'tree').

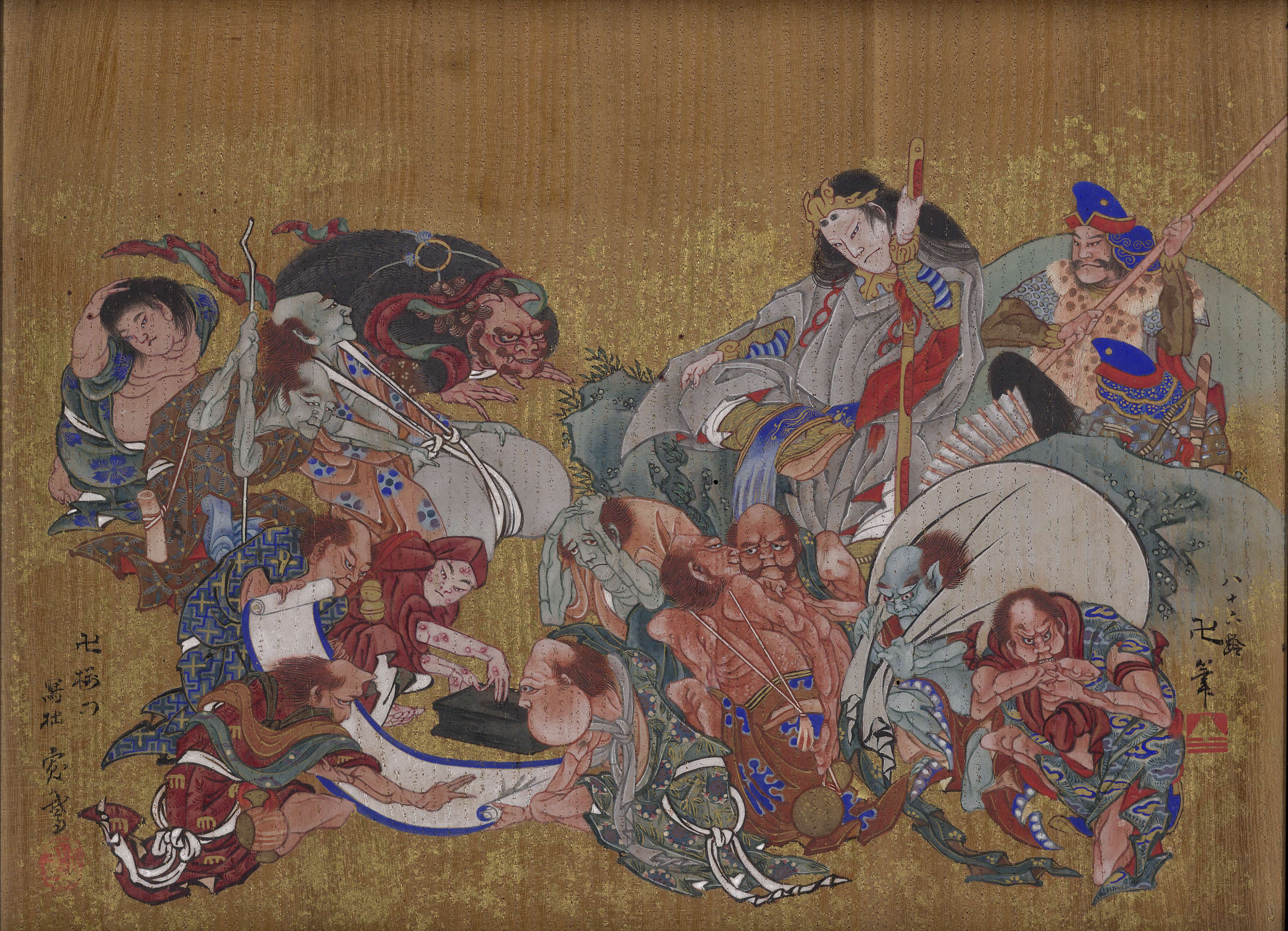
Susanoo subduing and making a pact with various spirits of disease (dated 1860, copy of original work by Katsushika Hokusai)

A few myths, such as that of Susanoo's descent in Soshimori in Silla, seem to suggest a connection between the god and the Korean Peninsula. Indeed, some scholars have hypothesized that the deities who were eventually conflated with Susanoo, Mutō Tenjin, and Gozu Tennō, may have had Korean origins as well, with the name 'Mutō' (武塔, historical orthography: mutau) being linked with the Korean word mudang "shamaness," and 'Gozu' being explained as a calque of 'Soshimori', here interpreted as being derived from a Korean toponym meaning 'Bull's (so) Head (mari)'. The name 'Susanoo' itself has been interpreted as being related to the Middle Korean title susung (transliterated as 次次雄 or 慈充), meaning 'master' or 'shaman', notably applied to Namhae, the second king of Silla, in the Samguk Sagi. Susanoo is thus supposed in this view to have originally been a foreign god (蕃神, banshin), perhaps a deified shaman, whose origins may be traced back to Korea.

Emilia Gadeleva (2000) sees Susanoo's original character as being that of a rain god – more precisely, a god associated with rainmaking – with his association with the harvest and a number of other elements from his myths ultimately springing from his connection with rainwater. He thus serves as a contrast and a parallel to Amaterasu, the goddess of the sun. Gadeleva also acknowledges the foreign elements in the god's character by supposing that rainmaking rituals and concepts were brought to Japan in ancient times from the continent, with the figure of the Korean shaman (susung) who magically controlled the abundance of rain eventually morphing into the Japanese Susanoo, but at the same time stresses that Susanoo is not completely a foreign import but must have had Japanese roots at his core. In Gadeleva's view, while the god certainly underwent drastic changes upon his introduction in the imperial myth cycle, Susanoo's character already bore positive and negative features since the beginning, with both elements stemming from his association with rain. As the right quantity of rainwater was vital for ensuring a rich harvest, calamities caused by too much or too little rainfall (i.e. floods, drought, or epidemics) would have been blamed on the rain god for not doing his job properly. This, according to Gadeleva, underlies the occasional portrayal of Susanoo in a negative light.

=== Susanoo and Ne-no-Kuni ===
In the Kojiki and the Nihon Shoki, Susanoo is repeatedly associated with Ne-no-Kuni (Japanese: 根の国; the "Land of Roots"). While sometimes seemingly considered to be more or less identical to Yomi, the Land of the Dead (the Kojiki speaks of Ne-no-Kuni as the land of Susanoo's deceased mother Izanami, who is stated earlier in the narrative to have become the ruler of Yomi, and calls the slope serving at its exit the Yomotsu Hirasaka, the 'Flat Slope of Yomi'), it would seem that the two were originally considered to be different locations.

While Matsumura Takeo suggested that Ne-no-Kuni originally referred to the dimly remembered original homeland of the Japanese people, Emilia Gadeleva instead proposes that the two locales, while similar in that both were subterranean realms associated with darkness, differed from each other in that Yomi was associated with death, while Ne-no-Kuni, as implied by the myth about Ōnamuji, was seemingly associated with rebirth. Ne-no-Kuni being a land of revival, as per Gadeleva's theory, is why Susanoo was connected to it: Susanoo, as the god that brought rain and with it, the harvest, was needed in Ne-no-Kuni to secure the rebirth of crops. In time, however, the two locations were confused with each other, so that by the time the Kojiki and the Shoki were written Ne-no-Kuni came to be seen like Yomi as an unclean realm of the dead. Gadeleva argues that this new image of Ne-no-Kuni as a place of evil and impurity contributed to Susanoo becoming more and more associated with calamity and violence.

=== Susanoo's rampage ===
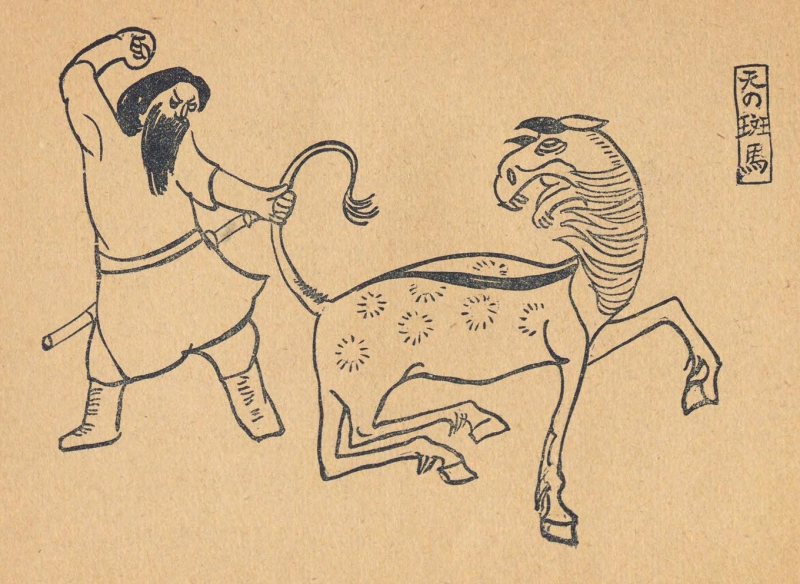
Susanoo about to flay the Heavenly Horse (Natori Shunsen)

Susanoo's acts of violence after proving his sincerity in the ukehi ritual has been a source of puzzlement to many scholars. While Edo period authors such as Motoori Norinaga and Hirata Atsutane believed that the order of the events had become confused and suggested altering the narrative sequence so that Susanoo's ravages would come before, and not after, his victory in the ukehi. (Note that as mentioned above, one of the variants in the Shoki does place Susanoo's ravages and banishment before the performance of the ukehi ritual.)

Tsuda Sōkichi saw a political significance in this story: he interpreted Amaterasu as an emperor-symbol, while Susanoo in his view symbolized the various rebels who (unsuccessfully) rose up against the imperial court.

Emilia Gadeleva observes that Susanoo, at this point in the narrative, is portrayed similarly to the hero Yamato Takeru (Ousu-no-Mikoto), in that both were rough young men possessed with "valor and ferocity" (takeku-araki kokoro); their lack of control over their fierce temperament leads them to commit violent acts. It was therefore imperative to direct their energies elsewhere: Ousu-no-Mikoto was sent by his father, the Emperor Keikō, to lead conquering expeditions, while Susanoo was expelled by the heavenly gods. This ultimately resulted in the two becoming famed as heroic figures.

A prayer or norito originally recited by the priestly Nakatomi clan in the presence of the court during the Great Exorcism (大祓, Ōharae) ritual of the last day of the sixth month, more commonly known today as the Ōharae no Kotoba (大祓詞, 'Words of the Great Exorcism'), lists eight "heavenly sins" (Japanese: 天つ罪, amatsu-tsumi), most of which are agricultural in nature:

1. Breaking down the ridges
2. Covering up the ditches
3. Releasing the irrigation sluices
4. Double planting
5. Setting up stakes
6. Skinning alive
7. Skinning backward
8. Defecation

1, 2, 6, 7 and 8 are committed by Susanoo in the Kojiki, while 3, 4, 5 are attributed to him in the Shoki. In ancient Japanese society, offenses related to agriculture were regarded as being as abhorrent as those which caused ritual impurity.

One of the offensive acts Susanoo committed during his rampage was 'skinning backward' (逆剥, sakahagi) the Ame-no-Fuchikoma (Japanese: 天の斑駒, "Heavenly-Piebald Horse"). Regarding this, William George Aston observed, "Indian myth has a piebald or spotted deer or cow among celestial objects. The idea is probably suggested by the appearance of the stars." Nelly Naumann (1982) meanwhile interpreted the spotted horse as a lunar symbol, with Susanoo's action being equivalent to the devouring or killing of the moon. To Naumann, the act of flaying itself, because it is performed in reverse, is intended to be a magical act that caused death. Indeed, in the Kojiki when Susanoo throws the flayed horse (or its hide) to Amaterasu's weaving hall, one of the weaving maidens injures herself and dies. (In the Shoki, it is Amaterasu herself who is alarmed and injured.) Emilia Gadeleva meanwhile connects Susanoo's act of skinning and flinging the horse with ancient Korean rainmaking rituals, which involved animal sacrifice.

The gods punish Susanoo for his rampages by cutting off his beard, fingernails, and toenails. One textual tradition in which the relevant passage is read as "cutting off his beard and causing the nails of his hands and feet to be extracted" (亦切鬚及手足爪令拔而) suggests that this was something along the lines of corporal punishment. Another tradition which reads the passage as "cutting off his beard and the nails of his hands and feet, had him exorcised" (亦切鬚及手足爪令祓而) meanwhile suggests that this was an act of purification, in which the sins and pollution that adhered to Susanoo are removed, thus turning him from a destroyer of life into a giver of life.

== Family ==
Susanoo's family tree (based on the Kojiki)

Izanagi | Izanami
Susanoo | Amaterasu | Tsukuyomi | Ōyamatsumi
Kamuōichihime | Ashinazuchi | Tenazuchi
Ōtoshi | Ukanomitama
Kushinadahime
Munakata goddesses (born from Amaterasu's sword) | Yashimajinumi

=== Consorts ===
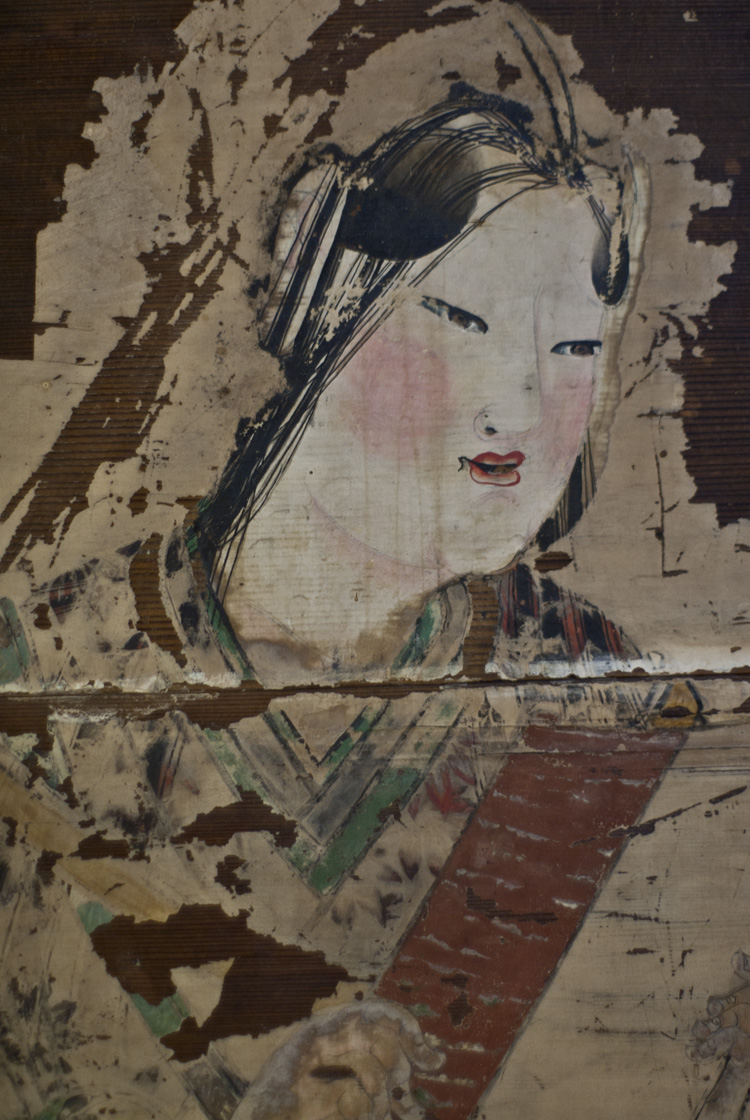
Muromachi period wall painting in Yaegaki Shrine depicting Kushinadahime

Susanoo's consorts are:

- Kushinadahime (櫛名田比売), daughter of Ashinazuchi and Tenazuchi, children of Ōyamatsumi, a son of Izanagi and elder brother of Susanoo (Kojiki, Nihon Shoki)

Also known under the following names:
- Kushiinadahime (奇稲田姫, Nihon Shoki)
- Inadahime (稲田媛, Shoki)
- Makami-Furu-Kushiinadahime (真髪触奇稲田媛, Shoki)
- Kushiinada-Mitoyomanurahime-no-Mikoto (久志伊奈太美等与麻奴良比売命, Izumo Fudoki)

- Kamuōichihime (神大市比売), another daughter of Ōyamatsumi (Kojiki)
- Samirahime-no-Mikoto (佐美良比売命), a goddess worshiped in Yasaka Shrine reckoned as a consort of Susanoo

=== Offspring ===
Susanoo's child by Kushinadahime is variously identified as Yashimajinumi-no-Kami (八島士奴美神) in the Kojiki and as Ōnamuchi-no-Kami (大己貴神) in the Nihon Shoki's main narrative. (In the Kojiki and in variant accounts contained in the Shoki, Ōnamuchi / Ōnamuji (Ōkuninushi) is instead Susanoo's descendant.)

Susanoo's children by Kamuōichihime meanwhile are:

- Ōtoshi-no-Kami (大年神)
- Ukanomitama-no-Kami (宇迦之御魂神)

Susanoo's children who are either born without a female partner or whose mother is unidentified are:

- The Munakata goddesses of Munakata Taisha in Munakata, Fukuoka Prefecture

- Takiribime-no-Mikoto (多紀理毘売命)
Also known as Tagorihime (田心姫)
- Ichikishimahime-no-Mikoto (市寸島比売命)
Also known as Okitsushimahime (瀛津島姫)
- Tagitsuhime-no-Mikoto (多岐都比売命)

- Suseribime-no-Mikoto (須勢理毘売命)

Also known as Wakasuserihime-no-Mikoto (和加須世理比売命) in the Izumo Fudoki

- Isotakeru / Itakeru-no-Mikoto (五十猛命)
- Ōyatsuhime-no-Mikoto (大屋津姫命)
- Tsumatsuhime-no-Mikoto (枛津姫命)

Deities identified as Susanoo's children found only in the Izumo Fudoki are:

- Kunioshiwake-no-Mikoto (国忍別命)
- Aohata-Sakusahiko-no-Mikoto (青幡佐草日古命)
- Iwasakahiko-no-Mikoto (磐坂日子命)
- Tsukihoko-Tooruhiko-no-Mikoto (衝桙等番留比古命)
- Tsurugihiko-no-Mikoto (都留支日子命)
- Yanowakahime-no-Mikoto (八野若日女命)

An Edo period text, the Wakan Sansai Zue (和漢三才図会, lit. "Illustrated Sino-Japanese Encyclopedia"), identifies a monstrous goddess known as Ama-no-Zako (天逆毎) as an offspring of Susanoo.

== Worship ==
In addition to his connections with the sea and tempests, due to his mythical role as the slayer of the Yamata no Orochi and his historical association with pestilence deities such as Gozu Tennō, Susanoo is also venerated as a god who wards off misfortune and calamity, being invoked especially against illness and disease. As his heroic act helped him win the hand of Kushinadahime, he is also considered to be a patron of love and marriage, such as in Hikawa Shrine in Saitama Prefecture (see below).

=== Shrines ===
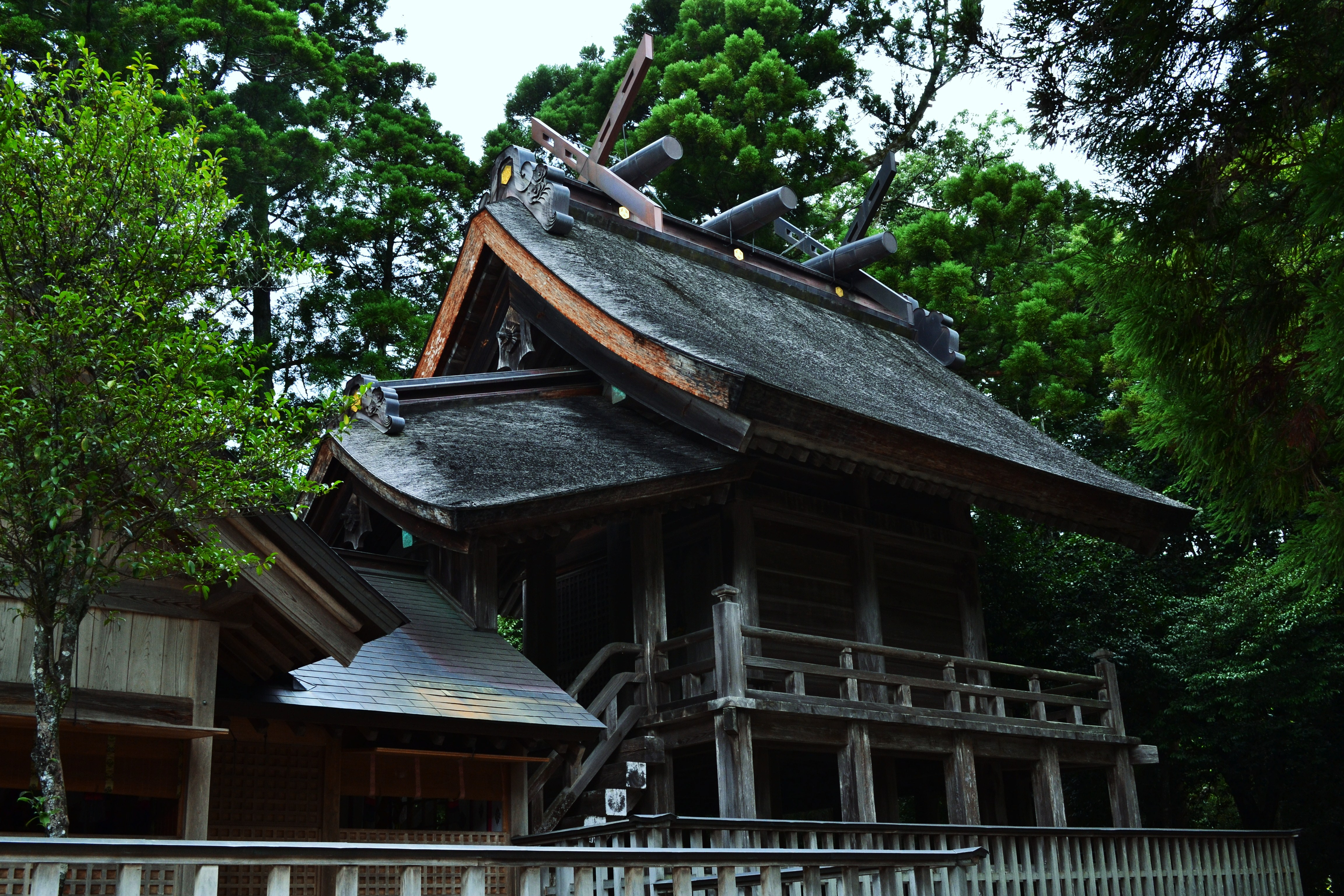
Susa Shrine in Izumo, Shimane Prefecture

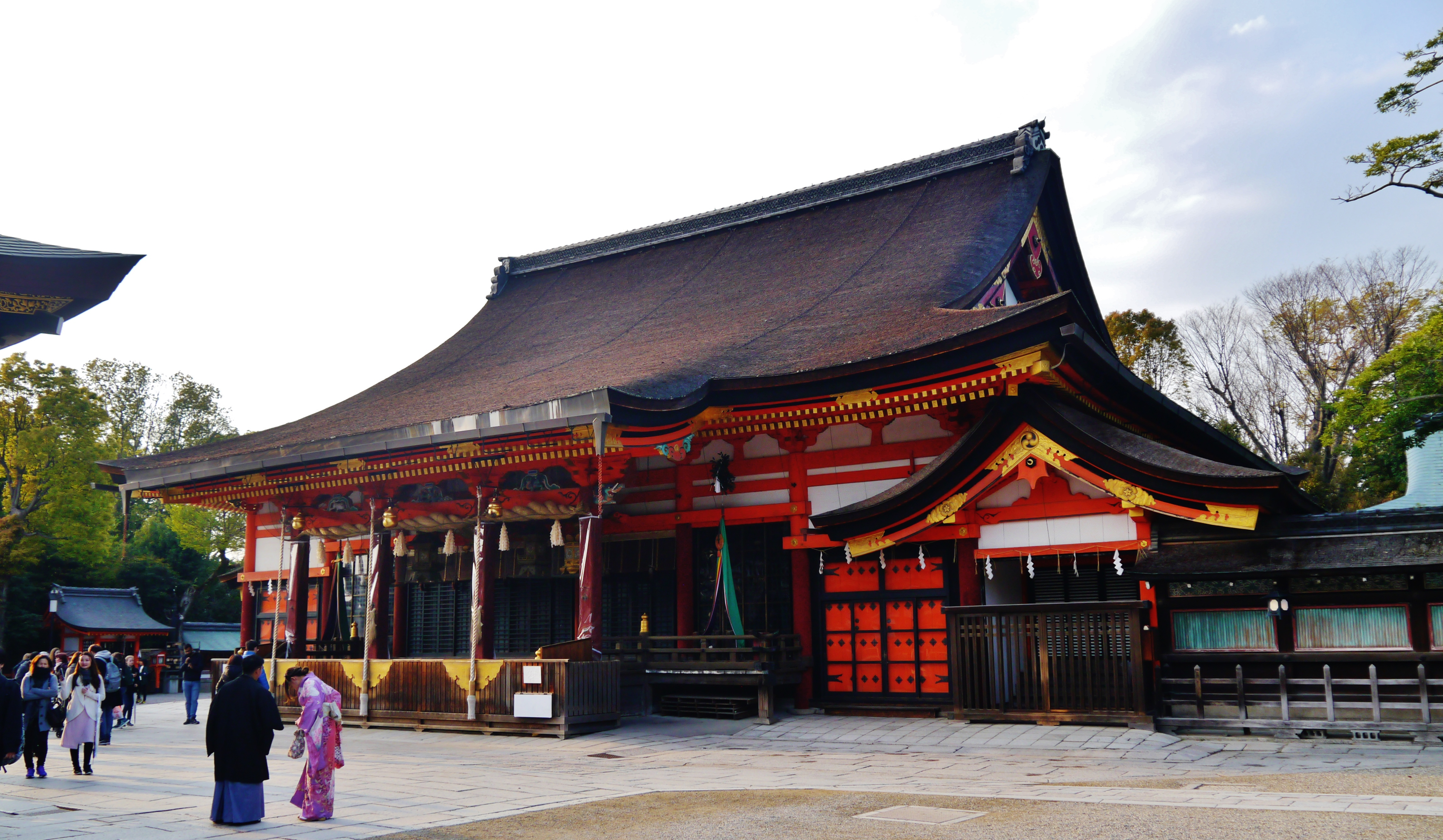
Yasaka Shrine in Kyoto, Kyoto Prefecture

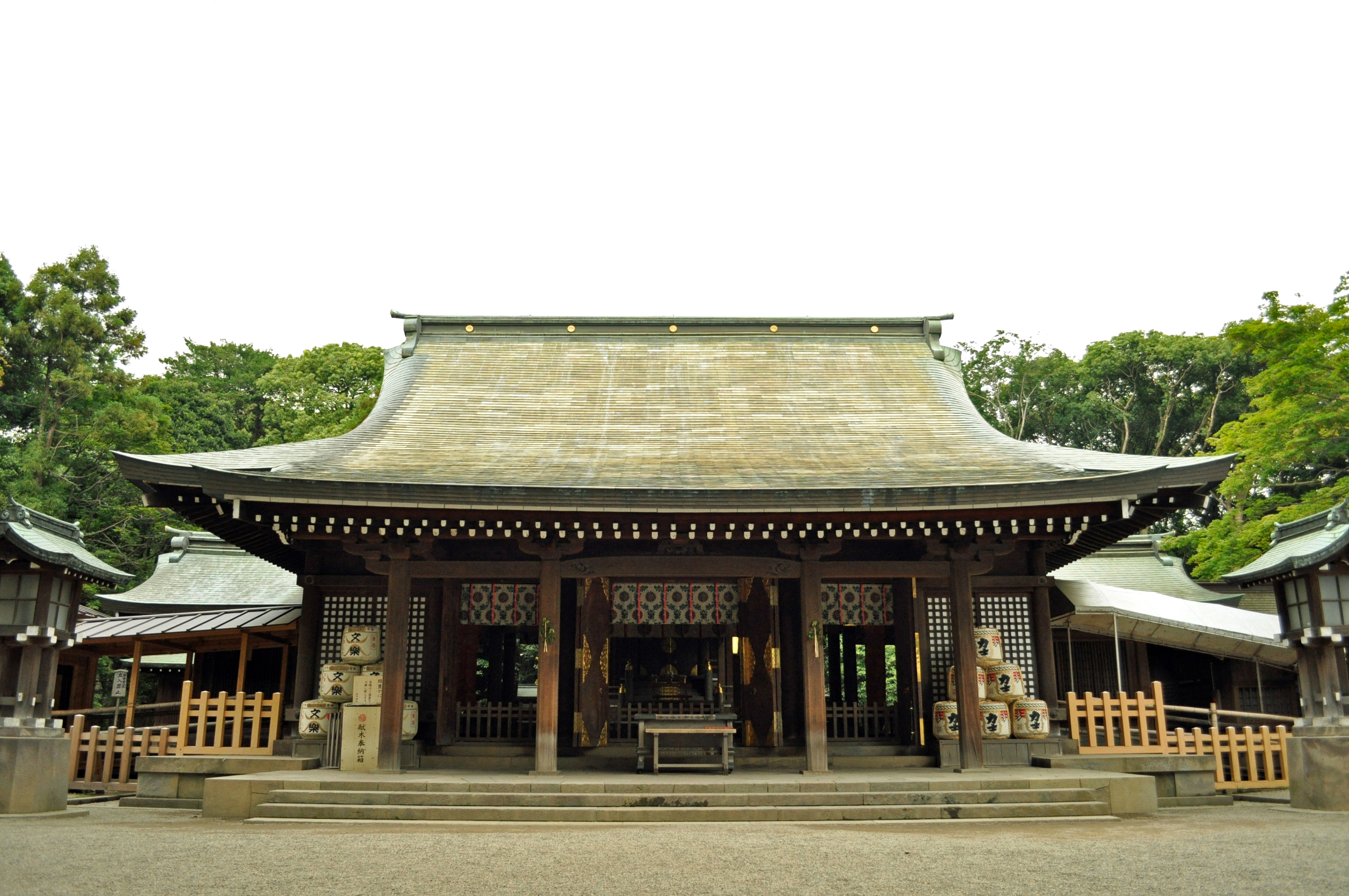
Hikawa Shrine in Saitama, Saitama Prefecture

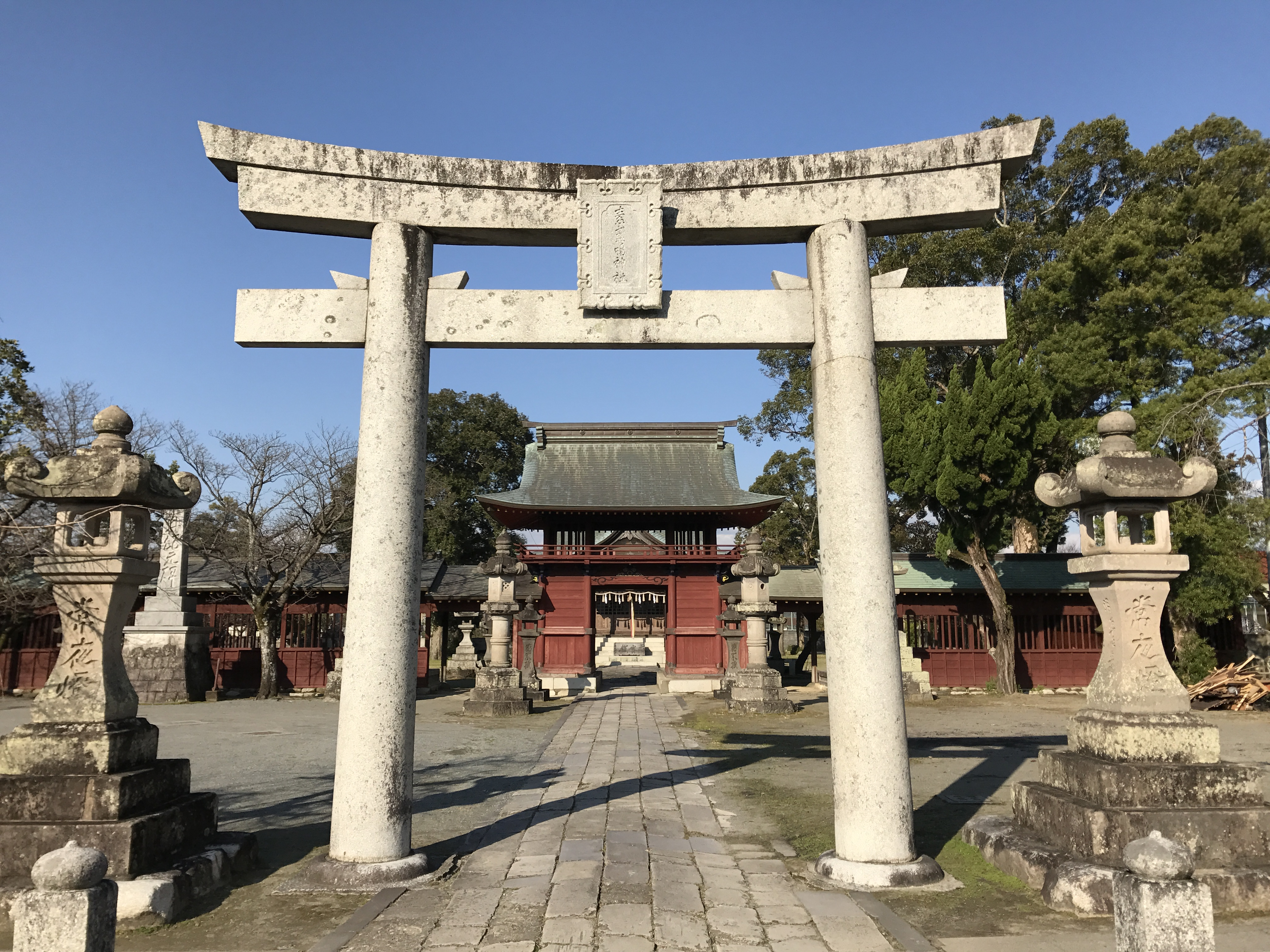
Susanoo Shrine in Chikugo-Yoshii, Ukiha, Fukuoka prefecture

Susanoo is worshiped in a number of shrines throughout Japan, especially in Shimane Prefecture (the eastern part of which is the historical Izumo Province). A few notable examples are:

- Susa Shrine (須佐神社) in Izumo, Shimane Prefecture

Listed in the Izumo Fudoki as one of five shrines in Iishi District that were registered with the Department of Divinities, this shrine is identified as the place in what was formerly the township of Susa where Susanoo chose to enshrine his spirit. The shrine was also known as Jūsansho Daimyōjin (十三所大明神) and Susa no Ōmiya (須佐大宮 'Great Shrine of Susa') during the medieval and early modern periods. The shrine's priestly lineage, the Susa (or Inada) clan (須佐氏 / 稲田氏), were considered to be the descendants of Susanoo via his son Yashimashino-no-Mikoto (八島篠命, the Kojiki's Yashimajinumi-no-Kami) or Ōkuninushi. Besides Susanoo, his consort Kushinadahime and her parents Ashinazuchi and Tenazuchi are also enshrined here as auxiliary deities.

- Suga Shrine (須我神社) in Unnan, Shimane Prefecture

This shrine, claimed to stand on the site of the palace Susanoo built after defeating the Yamata no Orochi, enshrines Susanoo, Kushinadahime, and their son Suga-no-Yuyamanushi-Minasarohiko-Yashima-no-Mikoto (清之湯山主三名狭漏彦八島野命, i.e. Yashimajinumi-no-Kami). Listed in the Izumo Fudoki as one of sixteen shrines in Ōhara District not registered with the Department of Divinities.

- Yaegaki Shrine (八重垣神社), in Matsue, Shimane Prefecture

Dedicated to Susanoo, Kushinadahime, Ōnamuchi (Ōkuninushi) and Aohata-Sakusahiko, the shrine takes its name from the 'eightfold fence' (yaegaki) mentioned in Susanoo's song. The shrine's legend claims that Susanoo hid Kushinadahime in the forest within the shrine's precincts, enclosing her in a fence, when he slew the Yamata no Orochi. Identified with the Sakusa Shrine (佐久佐社) mentioned in the Izumo Fudoki.

- Kumano Taisha (熊野大社) in Matsue, Shimane Prefecture

Reckoned as Izumo Province's ichinomiya alongside Izumo Grand Shrine. Not to be confused with the Kumano Sanzan shrine complex in Wakayama Prefecture. Its deity, known under the name 'Izanagi-no-Himanago Kaburogi Kumano-no-Ōkami Kushimikenu-no-Mikoto' (伊邪那伎日真名子加夫呂伎熊野大神櫛御気野命, "Beloved Child of Izanagi, Divine Ancestor [and] Great Deity of Kumano, Kushimikenu-no-Mikoto'), is identified with Susanoo. The shrine is also considered in myth to be where the use of fire originated; two ancient fire-making tools, a hand drill (燧杵 hikiri-kine) and a hearthboard (燧臼 hikiri-usu) are kept in the shrine and used in the shrine's Fire Lighting Ceremony (鑚火祭 Kiribi-matsuri or Sanka-sai) held every October.

- Susa Shrine (須佐神社) in Arida, Wakayama Prefecture

=== Gion shrines ===
The following shrines were originally associated with Gozu Tennō:

- Yasaka Shrine (八坂神社) in Gion, Higashiyama, Kyoto, Kyoto Prefecture – Head shrine of the Yasaka shrine network
- Tsushima Shrine (津島神社) in Tsushima, Aichi Prefecture – Head shrine of the Tsushima shrine network
- Hiromine Shrine (広峰神社) in Himeji, Hyōgo Prefecture

=== Hikawa Shrine network ===
The Hikawa Shrine network concentrated in Saitama and Tokyo (historical Musashi Province) also has Susanoo as its focus of worship, often alongside Kushinadahime.

- Hikawa Shrine (氷川神社) in Ōmiya, Saitama, Saitama Prefecture
- Hikawa Shrine in Kawagoe, Saitama Prefecture
- Hikawa Shrine in Akasaka, Minato, Tokyo
- Susanoo Shrine in Hamamatsu, Shizuoka Prefecture

== In Japanese performing arts ==
- The iwami kagura – Orochi
- The jōruri – Nihon Furisode Hajime (日本振袖始) by Chikamatsu Monzaemon

== Influence outside of Japan ==
In the 20th century, Susanoo was depicted as the common ancestor of the modern Koreans while the Japanese were considered to be descendants of Amaterasu during the Japanese occupation of Korea by historians such as Shiratori Kurakichi, founder of the discipline of Oriental History (Tōyōshi 東洋史) in Tokyo Imperial University.

The theory linked the Koreans to Susanoo and in turn the Japanese which ultimately legitimized the colonization of the Korean peninsula by the Japanese.

== In popular culture ==
Yamata Amasung Keibu Keioiba (English: Yamata-no-Orochi and Keibu Keioiba) is a Meitei language play that interweaves the stories of the two legendary creatures, Yamata-no-Orochi slain by Susanoo of Japanese folklore and Keibu Keioiba of Meitei folklore (Manipuri folklore). In the play, the role of Susanoo was played by Romario Thoudam Paona.

Along with Yamato Takeru, he was portrayed by Toshiro Mifune in The Birth of Japan. The film suggests Susanoo's grief over Izanami and resentment towards Izanagi caused his violent rampage.

== See also ==
- Ama no Fuchigoma
- Amaterasu
- Bhaisajyaguru
- Gion Matsuri
- Izanagi
- Izumo Province
- Kusanagi
- Poseidon (Susanoo's Greek counterpart)

== Bibliography ==
- Aoki, Michiko Y., tr. (1997). Records of Wind and Earth: A Translation of Fudoki, with Introduction and Commentaries. Association for Asian Studies, Inc. ISBN 978-0924304323.
- Aston, William George, tr. (1896). Nihongi: Chronicles of Japan from the Earliest Times to A.D. 697. 2 vols. Kegan Paul. 1972 Tuttle reprint.
- Chamberlain, Basil H., tr. (1919). The Kojiki, Records of Ancient Matters. 1981 Tuttle reprint.
- Gadeleva, Emilia (2000). "Susanoo: One of the Central Gods in Japanese Mythology". Nichibunken Japan Review: Bulletin of the International Research Center for Japanese Studies. 12 (12). International Research Center for Japanese Studies: 168. doi:10.15055/00000288. JSTOR 25791053.
- McMullin, Neil (February 1988). "On Placating the Gods and Pacifying the Populace: The Case of the Gion "Goryō" Cult". History of Religions. 27 (3). The University of Chicago Press: 270–293. doi:10.1086/463123. JSTOR 1062279. S2CID 162357693.
- Philippi, Donald L. (2015). Kojiki. Princeton University Press. ISBN 978-1400878000.
