= Ashinazuchi and Tenazuchi =

Pair of Japanese deities (kami)

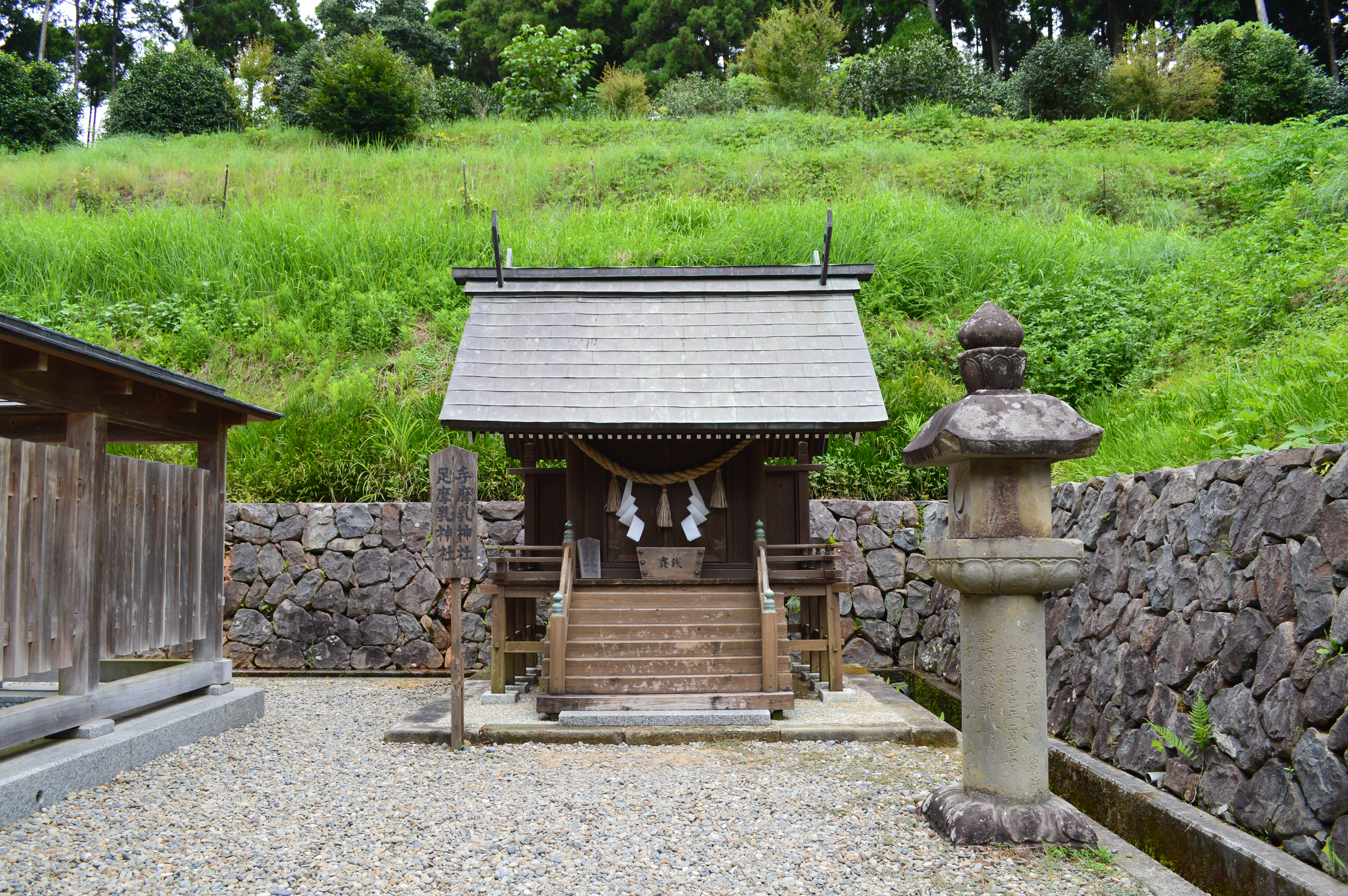
- Shrine to Ashinazuchi and Tenazuchi at Tsuno Shrine
- Offspring: Kushinadahime

Ashinazuchi (Japanese: 足名椎) and Tenazuchi (Japanese: 手名椎) are a married pair of Japanese earth deities (kami) that appear in the Kojiki. Their names mean "foot-earth" and "hand-earth" respectively. They are the parents of Kushinadahime, though they originally had eight daughters before the other seven were devoured by Yamata no Orochi, one every year.

== Description ==
Ashinazuchi and Tenazuchi appear as an old man and woman. Sometimes the names are switched, and Tenazuchi is the father. In versions where the names are swapped, Tenazuchi is said to also appear as Gendayū and protect travelers on the Tōkaidō road.

== Mythology ==
When Susanoo was exiled, he found Ashinazuchi and Tenazuchi weeping and consoling their daughter, Kushinadahime, by the Hii River. When he asked what was wrong they introduced themselves and explained that Yamata no Orochi was about to come for Kushinadahime, as it had done for their other seven daughters. Susanoo turned Kushinadahime into a comb and put her in his hair to keep her safe. He then had Ashinazuchi and Tenazuchi build an eight-gated fence and put a tub of saké behind each gate. When Yamata no Orochi arrived, it drank all the saké and fell asleep. Susanoo cut up the monster while it was asleep, finding the sword Kusanagi-no-Tsurugi in its tail.
