= Tamayori-hime =

Tamayori-hime may refer to:

- Tamayori-hime (mother of Jimmu), a goddess in Japanese mythology, mother of Emperor Jimmu
- Tamayori-hime (mother-in-law of Jimmu), a human woman in Japanese mythology, mother-in-law of Emperor Jimmu, mother of Himetataraisuzu-hime
