= Hikoyai =

Ancient Japanese Prince

- Born: unknown
- Died: April 4th Yamato Province
- Father: Jimmu
- Mother: Himetataraisuzu-hime

Hikoyai-no-Mikoto (日子八井命) was a member of a Japanese imperial clan from the Kojiki and other sources. He is one of the three princes born to Himetataraisuzu-hime on the banks of the Sakai River, and the eldest of the three. The name does not appear in the "Nihon Shoki" and there are no other names that are believed to be the same person. Hikoyai-no-Mikoto is the first son of Emperor Jimmu and Empress Himetataraisuzu-hime. His brothers are Kamuyaimimi and Emperor Suizei. After the death of Emperor Jimmu, Empress Himetataraisuzu-hime marries her stepson Tagishimimi, who would be considered a step-brother to Hikoyai-no-Mikoto and his brothers. Tagishimimi then attempts to assassinate the brothers, but instead is killed by Suizei who becomes the second emperor. Hikoyai-no-Mikoto does not have any significant role in the story and does not play an active role in the narrative. This is not uncommon in Japanese myths, where there are often brothers who do not play an active role in the story.

== Genealogy ==
A genealogical tree based on the Kojiki

	Himetataraisuzu-hime		Emperor Jimmu		Ahiratsu-hime
Kamuyaimimi		Hikoyai‡	Emperor Suizei	Tagishimimi	Kisumimi

‡ not in the Nihon Shoki

According to Kojiki, he was the son of Jimmu, the first emperor of Japan, and Himetataraisuzu-hime daughter of Omononushi no Mikoto.

On the other hand, there is no mention of his name in the Nihon Shoki, and in the Shinsen Seijiroku, the Ukyo Emperor's separate Ibarada-ren article and the "Aso Family Brief Genealogical Record", there is a different theory that claims that he is the son of Kamiyai-mimi-no-mikoto. In fact, the name of Hikoyamimikoto does not appear in the "Aso Family Tree" or the "Monzan Family Tree" in the 16th volume of the "Shoshu Keifu".

The "Shinsen Shōjiroku" commissioned by Emperor Saga and the "Aso family tree (阿蘇家略系譜, Aso-ka ryaku keifu)" list a different theory that Hikoyai was the son of Kamuyaimimi.。

== Descendant clans ==
In the Kojiki, Hikoyai is listed as the ancestor of Ibarada-ren, Teshima-ren, and others.

In Shinsengumi Seijiroku, the following clans are listed as descendants.

- Ibarata Ren by Emperor Ukyo -The same ancestor of Tachoomi . After Kamuyaimimi no Hikoyai no Mikoto.
- Ibarata Ren by Emperor Yamashiro-Ibarata Sukune's ancestor. After Hikoyai no Mikoto.
- Toyoshima Ren by Emperor Settsu --- Tachoomi's ancestor. After Hikoyai no Mikoto.
- Settsu Emperor Matsutsu Neck-Toyoshima Ren's ancestor.
- Sukune Ibarata by Emperor Kawachi --- Tachoomi's ancestor. After Hikoyai no Mikoto. In the same article, the name of Nomi no Sukune is given to the child.
- Kawachi Emperor Betsu Shimoieren-After Hikoyai-no-Mikoto.
- Kawachi Emperor Betsu Eshu-Hikoyai-no-Mikoto After the 7th grandson, Kurume Tsuhiko-mei.
- Owari-be by Emperor Kawachi-after Hikoyai-no-Mikoto.

== Notes ==
- The son of Emperor Jimmu . He is the elder brother of the second Emperor Suizei.
- According to "Kojiki", Emperor Jimmu was enthroned and married to Himetataraisuzu, and the three pillars of Hikoyai, Kamuyaimimi, and Suizei.
- It is said that Hikoyaimimi did not appear in "Nihon Shoki", and only Kamuyaimimi and Kamuyaimimikawa were born between Himetataraisuzuhime and Himetataraisuzuhime. In "Kujiki Kujiki", Hikoyai-no-Mikoto is the son of his younger brother, Kamuyaimimi-no-Mikoto.
- Also, in "Kojiki", the brothers of Kamuyaimimi and Kamuyaimimi killed their half-brother, Shimi Mimei, and at that time, Kamuyaimimi was shy, so his younger brother, Kamuyaimimi. Hikoyaimimi does not appear in the story of her succession to the throne.
- There are also three pillars (Hoseri, Hosuseri, and Hoori), and the youngest child succeeds to the throne. Only two of the three pillars have appeared, and one is ignored.
- Hikoyai-no-Mikoto is the ancestor of the Ibarata Ren and Teshima Ren.
- At Aso Shrine in Kumamoto, Hikoyai-no-Mikoto is the Kokuryu Myojin (Yoshimi-jin), and is the father of Asotsu-hime-mei, the princess of Takeiwatatsu-no-Mikoto, the child of Kamuyaimimi-no-Mikoto.

== Related Items ==
- Tsutsumine Shrine - A Shikinai Shrine in Ibaraki County, Kawachi State. There are two shrines in Osaka Prefecture Kadoma City, one of which enshrines the deity.
- Kusabe Yoshimi Shrine - Kumamoto Prefecture Aso District, Kumamoto Takamori Town. The shrine enshrines Hikohachi-no-mikoto as the main deity.
