= Kamotaketsunumi no Mikoto =

Japanese mythical god

Yatagarasu/Kamotaketsunumi
- Personification of Sun

Genealogy
- Parents: Futodama (father)
- Children: Tamayorihime-no-mikoto Tamayorihiko-no-mikoto

Equivalents
- Greek: Helios

Kamotaketsunumi no Mikoto (賀茂建角身命) is a god in Japanese mythology.

== Overview ==
He is also known by the name Yatagarasu.

Kamotaketsunumi is his name; '-no-Mikoto' is an honorific, denoting divinity.

Kamotaketsunumi

He is the founder of the Kamo clan of Yamashiro Province, and is known as the deity of the Shimogamo Shrine (Shimogamo Shrine).

According to Shinsen Shōjiroku, Kamotaketsunumi no Mikoto is the grandson of Kamimusubi. Kamotaketsunumi, under the command of Takamimusubi and Amaterasu, descended from the sky to the peak of Tsune in Hyuga and reached Mount Katsuragi in Yamato, where he incarnated as Yatagarasu and led Emperor Jimmu and contributed to his victory.

According to the Yamashiro-kuni Fudoki (an anecdote), he came from Katsuragiyama in Yamato to Kamo in Okada in Yamashiro (where the Okada Kamo Shrine is located) and settled at the confluence of the Katsuno River (Koya River) and the Kamo River (Kamo River) (where the Shimogamo Shrine is located).

Kamotaketsunumi-no-Mikoto had two children, son Tamayorihiko-no-mikoto and daughter Tamayorihime-no-mikoto. Tamayorihiko-no-mikoto later became the Lord of Kamo Prefecture. Tamayorihime-no-mikoto is said to have conceived and given birth to Kamowakeikazuchi-no-mikoto (the deity of Kamigamo Shrine) after putting a red lacquered arrow (an incarnation of the kami Honokazuchi-no-kami), near her bed.

== Genealogy ==
His father is Futodama

His daughter Tamayorihime-no-mikoto is the mother of Himetataraisuzu-hime, wife of Emperor Jimmu, not to be confused with Emperor Jimmu's own mother the goddess Tamayorihime daughter of Watatsumi.

Yatagarasu appears in Kojiki and Nihon Shoki, and in Nihon Shoki, it is also said that Kin Kite (golden Tobi) helped Emperor Jinmu in his battle with Naganomushihiko in the same scene of Jinmu's eastern expedition, which is another name for the god Amanohiwashi Ame-no-Kanatomi-no-mikoto, whose name is related to kinshi (golden kite), and therefore is considered to be the same as Ame-no-hikawashi-no-mikoto and Kamo-kenkakumikami-no-mikoto by Hirata Atsutane and others.

== See also ==
- List of Japanese deities
- Shimogamo Shrine
