= Ōmononushi =

Kami in Japanese mythology associated with Mount Miwa

Ōmononushi-no-Kami
- Mitama of Ōkuninushi; god of nation-building, agriculture, business, medicine, brewing, and seafaring
- Other names: Ōmononushi-no-Ōkami (大物主大神); Yamato-no-Ōmononushi-Kushimikatama-no-Mikoto (倭大物主櫛甕魂命, 倭大物主櫛𤭖玉命); Yatokakasu-Mimoro-no-Mikoto (八戸挂須御諸命); Ōmononushi-Ashihara-no-Shiko(o) (大物主葦原志許(乎)); Miwa-no-Ōkami (三輪大神); Ōmiwa-no-Ōkami (意富美和之大神); Miwa Myōjin (三輪明神); Miwa Daimyōjin (三輪大明神); Konpira Daigongen (金毘羅大権現); Ōsugi Daimyōjin (大杉大明神); Ōsugi Daigongen (大杉大権現)
- Japanese: 大物主神
- Major cult center: Ōmiwa Shrine (Mount Miwa), Kotohira Shrine, Ōsugi Shrine and others
- Symbols: snake
- Texts: Kojiki, Nihon Shoki, Harima Fudoki and others

Genealogy
- Consort: Ikutamayorihime; Mihotsuhime (Nihon Shoki); Seyadatarahime (Kojiki); Yamato-Totohimomosohime (Shoki)
- Children: Isukeyorihime / Isuzuhime; Kushimikata (Kojiki); Ōtataneko (Nihon Shoki)

Ōmononushi (Japanese: 大物主神, romanized: Ōmononushi-no-Kami; historical orthography: Ohomononushi) is a kami in Japanese mythology associated with Mount Miwa (also known as Mount Mimoro) in Sakurai, Nara Prefecture. He is closely linked in the imperial myth cycle recorded in the Kojiki (c. 712 CE) and the Nihon Shoki (720 CE) with the earthly kami Ōkuninushi (Ōnamuchi); indeed, the latter text treats 'Ōmononushi' as another name for or an aspect—more precisely, the spirit or mitama—of Ōnamuchi.

Ōmononushi's chief place of worship is Ōmiwa Shrine located at the foot of Mount Miwa, which serves as the shrine's object of worship (shintai); he is thus also known as Miwa-no-Ōkami (三輪大神, 'Great Deity of Miwa') or Miwa (Dai)myōjin (三輪(大)明神). In addition, he is also enshrined in some other shrines such as Ōsugi Shrine in Ibaraki Prefecture. The deity of Kotohira Shrine (Kotohira-gū) in Kotohira, Kagawa Prefecture, popularly known as Konpira Daigongen (金毘羅大権現), is also currently identified with Ōmononushi.

== Name ==
The name 'Ōmononushi' (大物主(おおものぬし); historical orthography: おほものぬし, Ohomononushi; Old Japanese: Opomo_{2}no_{2}nusi) is translated either as 'Great Thing Master' (after a literal translation of the characters used in his name) or 'Great Spirit Master' (with mono being taken as meaning 'spirit' or 'supernatural entity'). The deity is also given the name 'Yamato-no-Ōmononushi-Kushimikatama-no-Mikoto' (倭大物主櫛𤭖玉命, lit. 'Great Master of Things / Spirits, the Wondrous Awe-Inspiring Spirit (tama) of Yamato') in the Izumo no Kuni no Miyatsuko no Kanʼyogoto (出雲国造神賀詞, 'Congratulatory Words of the Chieftain of Izumo'), a ritual declaration (norito) delivered by the governor or kuni no miyatsuko of Izumo Province at the imperial court upon his appointment.

A passage in the Fudoki of Harima Province (modern Hyōgo Prefecture) meanwhile refers to a deity worshiped at Misaka Shrine in the village of Shijimi in Minō District (modern Miki City) known both as 'Yatokakesu- / Yatokakasu-Mimoro-no-Mikoto' (八戸桂掛須御諸命) and 'Ōmononushi-Ashihara-no-Shiko(o)' (大物主葦原志許(乎); Ashihara-no-Shikoo 'Ugly Man / Young Warrior of the Reed Plains' is used in the Kojiki and the Shoki as another name for Ōkuninushi).

== Mythology ==
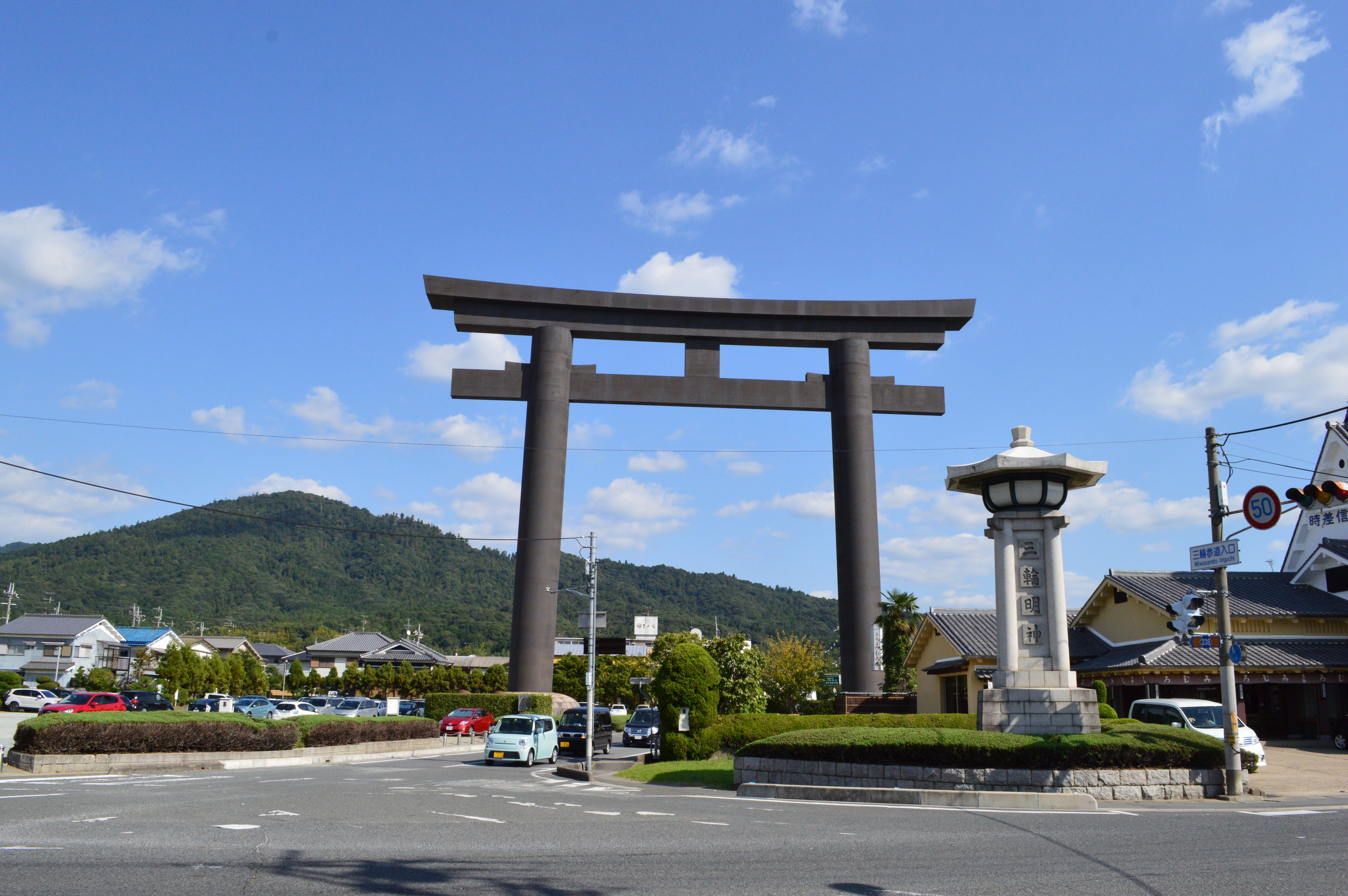
Mount Miwa with the torii of Ōmiwa Shrine in the foreground

=== Ōmononushi and Ōkuninushi ===
Ōmononushi first appears in the narrative of the god Ōkuninushi's pacification and development of the terrestrial world, Ashihara-no-Nakatsukuni.

When Ōkuninushi (also known as Ōnamuchi), the descendant (so the Kojiki) or the son (Nihon Shoki) of the god Susanoo, took upon himself the monumental task of developing Ashihara-no-Nakatsukuni, a dwarf named Sukunabikona appeared from beyond the sea and became his partner. However, after a time Sukunabikona left Ōkuninushi and went to the 'eternal land' (常世国, tokoyo no kuni). As Ōkuninushi was lamenting Sukunabikona's departure, another god "illuminating the sea" appears before Ōkuninushi, promising to aid him in his task if he (Ōkuninushi) will worship him. Ōkuninushi, in accordance with the god's wish, then enshrined him in Mount Mimoro (Mount Miwa) in the land of Yamato. While this god is yet unidentified at this point in the Kojiki, the version of the myth found in the Nihon Shoki has this deity explicitly identify himself as Ōnamuchi's (the default name of Ōkuninushi in this text) kushimitama and sakimitama (幸魂奇魂, 'wondrous spirit' and 'lucky/auspicious spirit', respectively). Indeed, this same passage lists 'Ōmononushi' as one of the various names for Ōnamuchi.

A variant version of the myth of Ōnamuchi's cession of Ashihara-no-Nakatsukuni to the gods of the heavenly realm Takamagahara found in the Shoki treats 'Ōmononushi' as a name for Ōnamuchi after he left the physical realm to govern the unseen world of the spirit. In this story, Ōnamuchi-as-Ōmononushi along with his son Kotoshironushi ascends to Takamagahara to swear fealty to the heavenly kami. As a reward, the primordial deity Takamimusubi gives Ōmononushi his daughter Mihotsuhime (三穂津姫) to be his wife and then sends him back to earth with "the eighty myriads of deities" to become the guardians of the goddess Amaterasu's descendants, the Japanese imperial house.

In the Izumo no Kuni no Miyatsuko no Kanʼyogoto, Ōnamochi (Ōkuninushi), after relinquishing his authority over the land, attaches his nigitama (和魂, 'gentle spirit') in an 'eight-hand mirror' (八咫鏡 yata no kagami), which he then enshrined in Miwa under the name 'Yamato-no-Ōmononushi-Kushimikatama-no-Mikoto' to serve as a patron of the imperial house along with his children, who he installed in various shrines in the Yamato area.

=== Isukeyorihime (Isuzuhime) ===
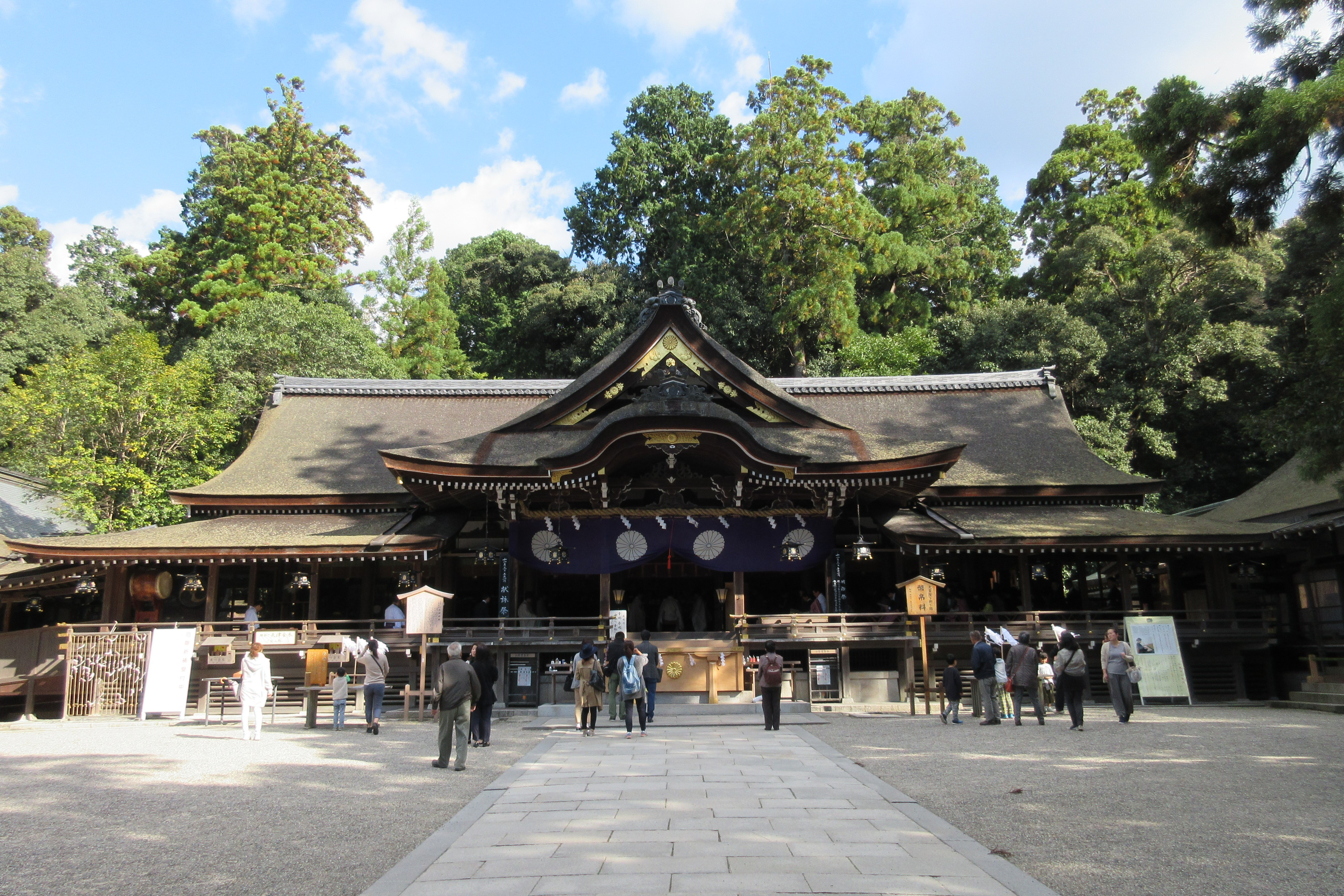
Haiden of Ōmiwa Shrine

The Kojiki relates that when Kamuyamato-Iwarebiko (also known as Emperor Jimmu), the great-grandson of Ninigi (Amaterasu's grandson who came down from heaven to govern Ashihara-no-Nakatsukuni after it was surrendered by Ōkuninushi), was searching for a wife, he was told about a woman named Seyadatarahime (勢夜陀多良比売) who bore a daughter after she was impregnated by Ōmononushi, who took the form of a red arrow and struck her genitals while she was defecating in a ditch. Iwarebiko wooed this daughter, named Hototatara-Isusukihime (富登多多良伊須須岐比売) or Himetatara-Isukeyorihime (比売多多良伊須気余理比売; an altered form of the name which omits the taboo word hoto 'genitals'), and took her as his wife.

While the main narrative of the first volume of the Nihon Shoki first describes this daughter, there named Himetatara-Isuzuhime (媛蹈鞴五十鈴媛), as the offspring of the god of Ōmiwa (i.e. Ōmononushi) in agreement with the Kojiki, it is then immediately followed by an alternative account which portrays her as the child of the god Kotoshironushi and the goddess Mizokuhihime (溝樴姫)—also known as Tamakushihime (玉櫛姫)—conceived after Kotoshironushi transformed himself into a gigantic wani and had intercourse with her. Likewise the main narrative in the third and fourth volumes refer to her as the daughter of Kotoshironushi rather than Ōmononushi.

=== Ōtataneko and Ikuhi serve Ōmononushi ===
Both the Kojiki and the Nihon Shoki relate that a series of devastating plagues affected the country during the reign of Emperor Sujin. After performing divination to ascertain the will of the kami, the emperor then received a revelation from Ōmononushi via a dream (Kojiki) or an oracle delivered by Yamato-Totohimomosohime (倭迹迹日百襲姫命), the emperor's grandaunt (Shoki). In it, Ōmononushi claimed responsibility for the pestilence and announced that it would not stop until he was offered due worship by a man named Ōtataneko (意富多多泥古命 / 大田田根子), who is either his son (Shoki) or his great-great-grandson (Kojiki) through a woman named Ikutamayorihime (活玉依毘売 / 活玉依媛). After Ōtataneko was found and appointed to serve Ōmononushi at his shrine, the epidemic ceased. Ōtataneko is reckoned to be the ancestor of the priestly clans of Kamo (鴨君 Kamo no Kimi) and Miwa (神君 / 三輪君 Miwa no Kimi).

The Shoki adds that Sujin appointed another individual named Ikuhi (活日) as the brewer of sake presented as offerings to Ōmononushi. When worship of the deity was conducted at the shrine in Miwa, Ikuhi offered the emperor some of this sacred sake (miki) while singing the following song:

Kono miki wa
wa ga miki narazu
Yamato nasu
Ōmononushi no
kamishi miki
ikuhisa ikuhisa

Translation:

This sacred sake
Is not my sacred sake:
'Tis sacred sake brewed
By Oho-mono-nushi,
Of Yamato,
How long ago!
How long ago!

— Translation by W. G. Aston

A feast was then held at the shrine, after which the emperor sang:

Umazake
Miwa no tono no
asato ni mo
oshi hirakane
Miwa no tonodo wo

Translation:

The Hall of Miwa
(Of sweet sake fame),
Even its morning-door
I would push open—
The door of the Hall of Miwa.

— Translation by W. G. Aston

=== Affair with Ikutamayorihime ===
The Kojiki follows the account of Ōtataneko's appointment as Ōmononushi's priest with the story of Ōmononushi's affair with Ikutamayorihime.

The beautiful Ikutamayorihime was visited night after night by a handsome young stranger who got her with child. Anxious to discover the man's identity, Ikutamayorihime's parents advised her to sew a hemp thread to the hem of the man's garment. The following morning, the yarn was found passing through the keyhole of her chamber door, leading straight to Mount Miwa. Ikutamayorihime and her parents accordingly knew that her lover had been Ōmononushi, the god of the mountain. This legend explains the name 'Miwa' as deriving from the three (mi-) loops or twists (wa) of hemp thread that remained.

=== Yamato-Totohimomosohime's death ===
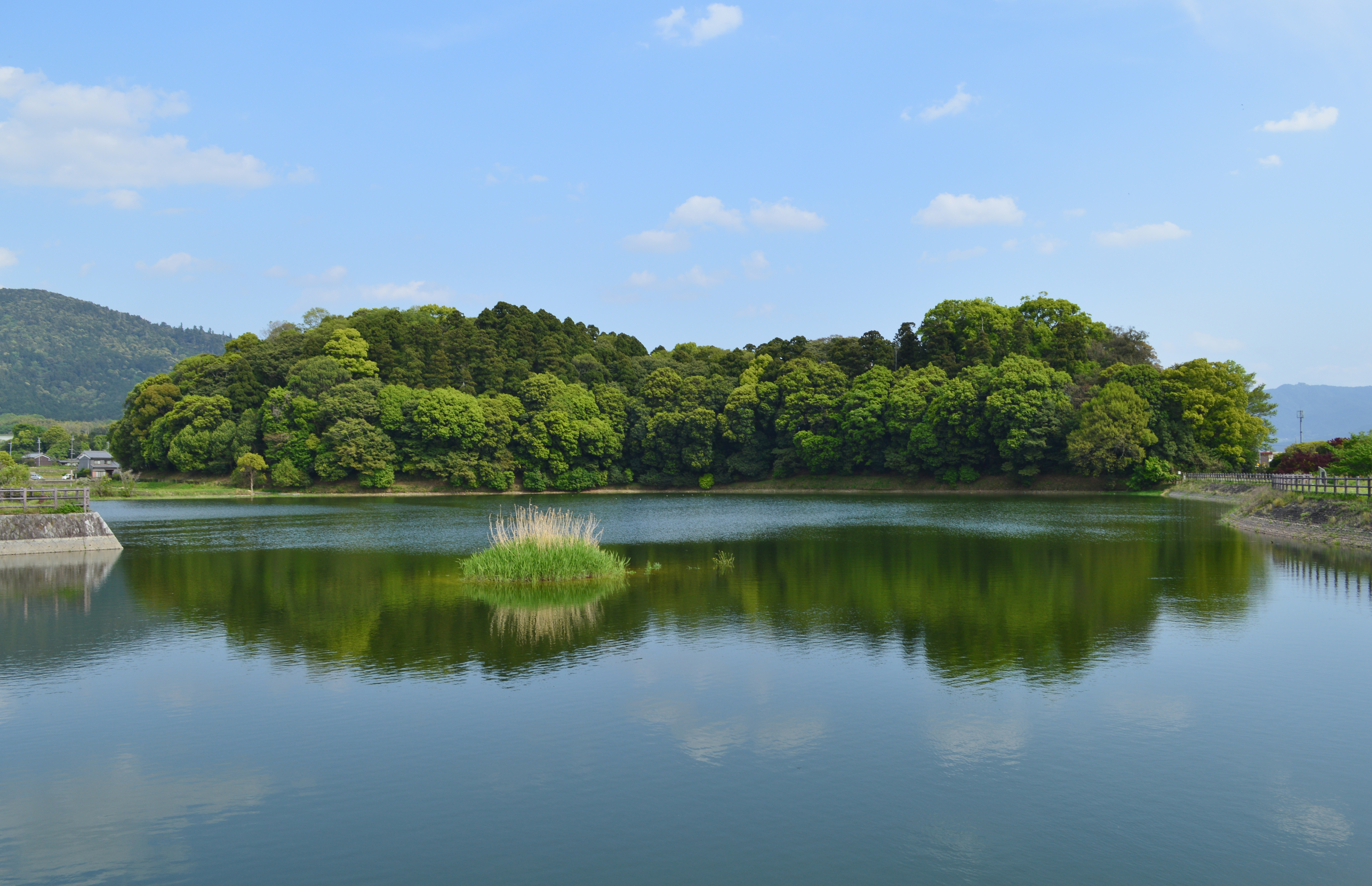
Hashihaka Kofun (箸墓古墳), a late 3rd-early 4th century burial mound (kofun) at the foot of Mount Miwa in Sakurai, Nara Prefecture. A legend recorded in the Nihon Shoki claims this tumulus to be the tomb of Yamato-Totohimomosohime.

The Nihon Shoki records the following story about Yamato-Totohimomosohime, a daughter of Emperor Kōrei and Emperor Sujin's grandaunt.

Yamato-Totohimomosohime became wed to Ōmononushi, but the god visited her only at night and was never seen in the daytime. When she requested to see his true form, he hid in her comb case, where she found him as a small snake. After her alarm caused the snake to flee in shame and anger to Mount Miwa, Yamato-Totohimomosohime in remorse stabs her genitals with a chopstick and dies.

This narrative serves as an origin myth for Hashihaka Kofun (hashi (no) haka means 'chopstick tomb') at the western foot of Mount Miwa, which is here claimed to be Yamato-Totohimomosohime's tomb. The tumulus, which the story claims to be made of stone from Mount Ōsaka (大坂山, identified with Mount Nijō on the border of Nara and Osaka, located 15.3 kilometres (9.5 mi) west of the tomb), is said to have been made by men in the daytime and by the gods at night; the stones used in its construction are said to have been transported from the mountain to the mound by workers standing in single file, who passed the stones from hand to hand.

=== Emperor Yūryaku and the serpent of Mount Miwa ===
An episode recorded in the Shoki concerning Emperor Yūryaku relates that the emperor, wishing to see the physical form of the god of Mount Miwa (Note: A scholia in the text remarks that the deity in question is identified either as Ōmononushi or as Uda-no-Sumisaka-no-Kami (菟田墨坂神, one of the deities worshiped by Emperor Sujin to quell the epidemic that occurred during his reign).) with his own eyes, commanded a retainer named Chiisakobe no Sugaru (少子部蜾蠃) to fetch the deity. Sugaru went up the mountain and captured a large snake, which he presented to the emperor. However, as Yūryaku neglected to ritually purify himself beforehand, the serpent made thunderous noise (or summoned thunder) and its eyeballs flashed. The emperor fled for fear of the snake and ordered it to be returned to Mount Miwa. He then gave the mountain (or Sugaru) the name 'Ikazuchi' (雷), meaning "thunder".

A different variant of this story is found in the Nihon Ryōiki (c. 822 CE). There, Sugaru is commanded to capture the thunder god after Sugaru accidentally walked into the palace while the emperor was making love with the empress. Sugaru then went out and summoned the god to appear before the emperor, at which lightning struck near the temple of Toyura-dera (modern Kōgen-ji in the village of Asuka in Nara Prefecture). Sugaru sent for priests to place this lightning (i.e. the thunder god) in a palanquin, which he then brought before the emperor. The emperor was frightened after the god gave off a brilliant flash of light and had it released at the hill where it fell, which became known as Ikazuchi-no-Oka (雷丘 'Thunder Hill').

=== In later mythology ===
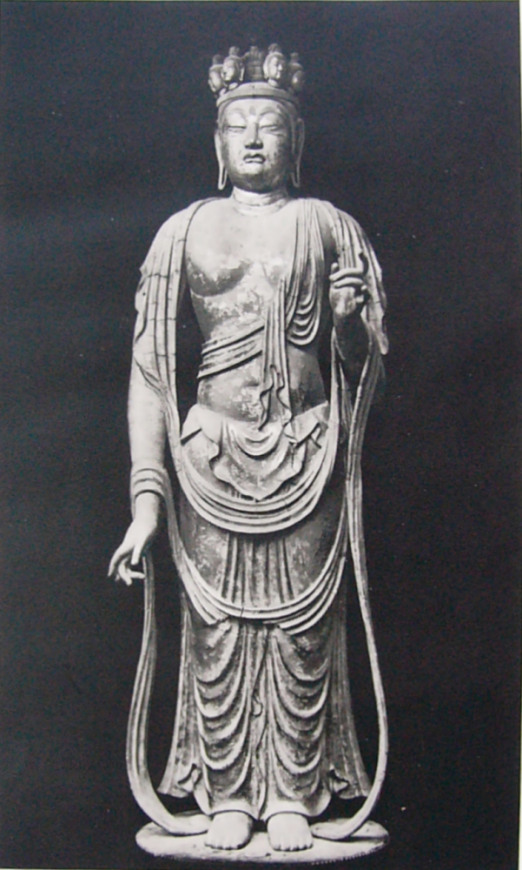
Late 8th century (Nara period) statue of the Eleven-faced Avalokiteśvara (Jūichimen Kannon). Formerly the principal image or honzon of Daigorin-ji (the former jingū-ji of Ōmiwa Shrine), this image was transferred to Shorin-ji in Sakurai, Nara when the separation of Shinto and Buddhism was mandated during the Meiji period.

A late 13th-century (Kamakura period) text, the Miwa Daimyōjin Engi (三輪大明神縁起), features retellings of two of the above myths concerning Ōmononushi reinterpreted within a Buddhist framework.

- The Engi's version of the narrative of Ōnamuchi's encounter with Ōmononushi (based on the one found in the Nihon Shoki) identifies the god enshrined in Miwa to be Tenshō Kōtaijin (天照皇太神, the Amaterasu of classical mythology). Indeed, Miwa Daimyōjin, the deity of Mount Miwa, and Kōtaijin, the deity of Mount Kamiji in Ise Province (i.e. Ise Shrine), are treated in the text to be two different earthly incarnations of the same heavenly deity Tenshō / Amaterasu, who in turn is a manifestation of the buddha Vairocana (Dainichi). At the same time, however, the text claims that the shrine in Miwa is superior to that of Ise, in that the Miwa deity's descent to earth occurred during the mythical Age of the Gods, whereas Tenshō Daijin was only enshrined in Ise much later, during the reign of Emperor Suinin.
- The story of Ōmononushi's amorous relationship with Ikutamayorihime is here transformed into an origin legend of Daigorin-ji (大御輪寺, also Ōmiwa-dera), the Buddhist temple (jingū-ji) associated with Ōmiwa Shrine during the medieval period.

This temple was the first Buddhist facility constructed in the ninety-ninth year of the reign of Emperor Suinin, the eleventh human [sovereign]. At the time there was a certain Takeichihara dainagon (武一(二)原大納言). He had one daughter. The deity of this [Ōmiwa] shrine was secretly making his way every night to make love with this woman, who eventually bore a male child. Both the parents of the woman as well as all others [high and low] were suspicious and asked her the reason. The daughter, to resolve her own and others' suspicions, took a fine thread and attached it to the hem of [her lover's] garment, and sought to know where the thread led. It entered directly into the middle of the three places, the altar of the great shrine (ōmiya no shadan 大宮之社壇). At that time they first learned that it was the Great Deity (jinmyō 神明) [of Miwa]. Afterward, following a request of the dainagon, the deity manifested itself in the form of a large snake and licked the prince's back (some legends say that it licked his chest). On the licked spot a golden mark appeared that said, "The Master of Great Things, of Upper First Rank, the Great Deity, Outstanding [for its services in the matters of state] (shō ichii daimyōjin kun ittō Ōmono no nushi 正一位大明神勲一等大物之主)." [...] The dainagon retired from the world to his own mansion and converted his private residence into a Buddhist temple (garan 伽藍). This was Ōmiwadera.

The narrative adds that the boy's mother died seven days after giving birth. The prince grew up, longing for his compassionate mother. To console the grieving boy, the Miwa deity appeared in the form of a man and gave him a statue bearing his mother's likeness. Thereafter, the prince constantly worshiped at the god's shrine until he reached his teens, when he secluded himself in a cell in the temple and entered samādhi, never to come out again. Six centuries later, Prince Shōtoku visited the temple and discovered the statue of the prince's mother, which the story identifies with the principal image of Daigorin-ji, that of the Eleven-Faced Kannon (Avalokiteśvara).

Ōmononushi is the kami of rain.

== See also ==
- Legend of the White Snake
- Kamo clan
- Kotohira-gū
- Kotoshironushi
- Mount Miwa
- Mitama
- Ōkuninushi
- Snake worship

== Bibliography ==
- Andreeva, Anna (2010). "The Karmic Origins of the Great Bright Miwa Deity: A Transformation of the Sacred Mountain in Premodern Japan". Monumenta Nipponica. 65 (2): 245–296. doi:10.1353/mni.2010.0003. JSTOR 41303211. S2CID 162818503.
- Aoki, Michiko Y., tr. (1997). Records of Wind and Earth: A Translation of Fudoki, with Introduction and Commentaries. Association for Asian Studies, Inc. ISBN 978-0924304323.
- Aston, William George, tr. (1896). Nihongi: Chronicles of Japan from the Earliest Times to A.D. 697. 2 vols. Kegan Paul. 1972 Tuttle reprint.
- Chamberlain, Basil H., tr. (1919). The Kojiki, Records of Ancient Matters. 1981 Tuttle reprint.
- Philippi, Donald L. (2015). Kojiki. Princeton University Press. ISBN 978-1400878000.
