= Kisumimi =

Character in Japanese mythology

- Born: unknown
- Died: Yamato Province
- Father: Jimmu
- Mother: Ahiratsu-hime

Kisumimi-no-mikoto is a character in Japanese mythology, a male deity and the son of the first Emperor Jimmu. He is the younger brother of Tagishimimi and some speculate they were the same person.

== References in the Kiki ==
The Nihon Shoki simple describes him and Tagishimimi as being born to Ahiratsu-hime and Emperor Jimmu. without further mention

== Genealogy ==
A genealogical tree based on the Kojiki

	Himetataraisuzu-hime		Emperor Jimmu		Ahiratsu-hime
Kamuyaimimi		Hikoyai‡	Emperor Suizei	Tagishimimi	Kisumimi

‡ not in the Nihon Shoki

== Footnotes ==
=== Bibliographic information ===
- "Dictionary of Japanese Divine Names", Jinja-Shimpo-Sha, 1994, 1995 (2nd edition), ISBN 4-915265-66-8
- "Dictionary of Japan's Ancient Shinto Gods", Kazunori Yoshida/editor, Chunichi Press, 2000, ISBN 4-88519-158-0
- "Dictionary of Japanese Gods and Buddha", Takehiko Oshima, Minoru Sonoda, Fumio Keimuro, Setsu Yamamoto (eds.), Taishukan Shoten, 2001, ISBN 4-469-01268-8
- "Nihon no Kami Yomiwake Jiten" (An Encyclopedia of Japanese Gods), Kenji Kawaguchi/editor, Kashiwa Shobo, 1999, 2009 (9th printing), ISBN 4-7601-1824-1
- "Kojiki to Nihon no Kami ga Kunderu Hon" (The Book of Ancient Matters and Understanding Japanese Gods), Kunihiro Yoshida, Gakken Publishing, 2015, ISBN 978-4-05-406340-2
- "Illustrated Chronicle of the Rekiyo Emperors", Edited by Masao Mitobe, Kazuo Higo, Shizuko Akagi, Shigetaka Fukuchi, Akita Shoten, 1989, ISBN 4-253-00297-8
- "A Genealogical Directory of the Empresses of the Rekishi Era" (Bessatsu Rekishi Yomihon 24, Vol. 27, No. 29, 618), edited by Minoru Sato, Shinninjin Oraisha, 2002
- "The History of Hyuga Province: An Ancient History" by Sadakichi Kida, Toyo-do, 1943
