= Himetataraisuzu-hime =

Legendary first empress of Japan

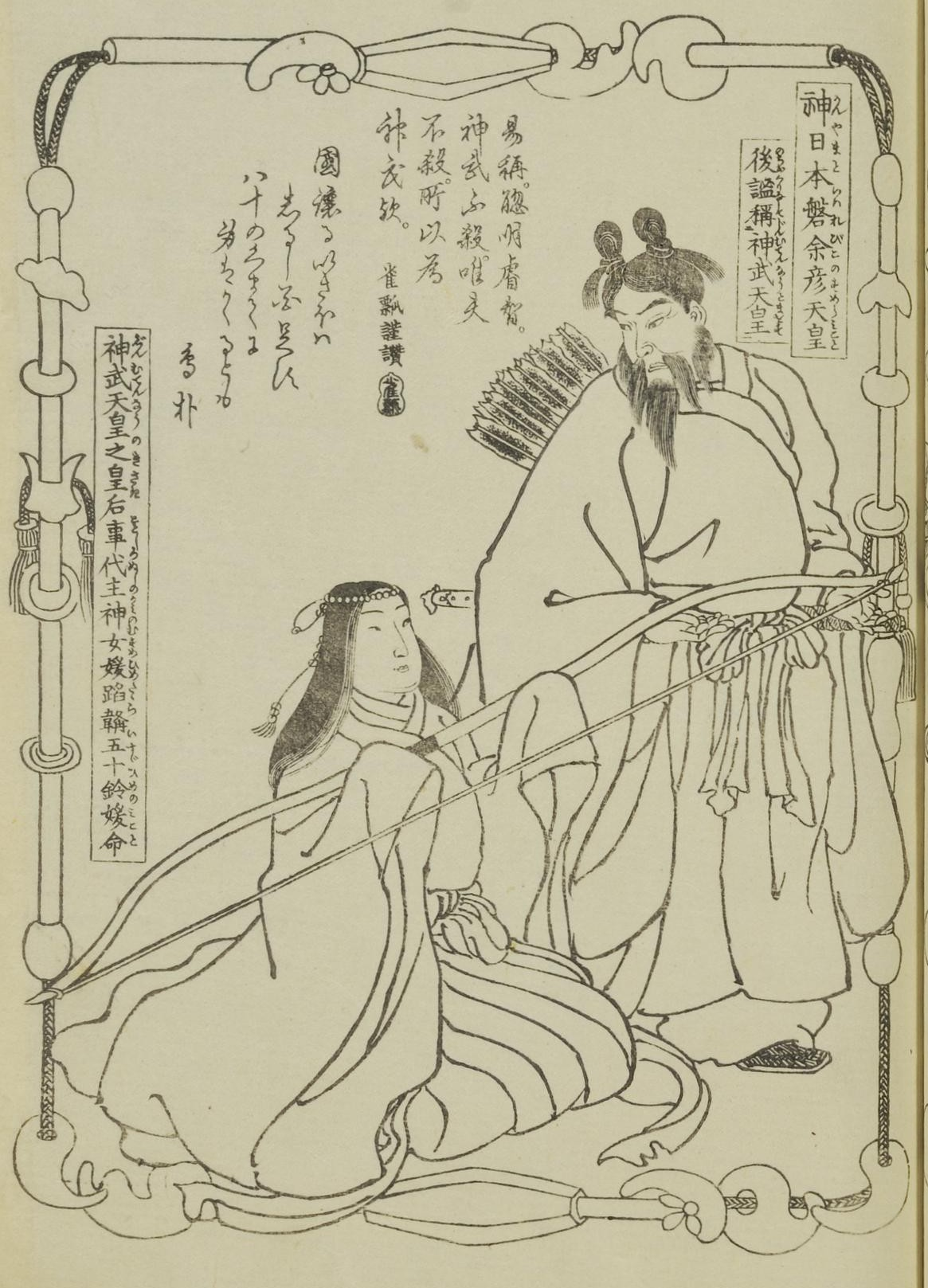
- Emperor Jimmu and his wife Empress Himetataraisuzu-hime from the first volume of Utagawa Kuniyoshi's "Nipponkoku Kaibyaku Yurai-ki"

Empress consort of Japan
- Tenure: 660–581 BC

Empress dowager of Japan
- Tenure: appointed in 581 BC
- Spouse: Emperor Jimmu
- Issue: Hiko-yai; Kan-yai-mimi; Emperor Suizei
- Father: Kotoshironushi (Nihon Shoki); Ōmono-nushi (Kojiki)
- Mother: Tamakushi-hime (Nihon Shoki); Saya-datara-hime (Kojiki)
- Religion: Shinto

Hime-tatara-isuzu hime (媛蹈鞴五十鈴媛) (Note: In Nihon Shoki, her name is written as "媛蹈鞴五十鈴媛命, Hime-tatara-isuzu-hime no mikoto" or "媛蹈鞴五十鈴媛"" etc.) is a Japanese mythological figure, a female deity (goddess), appeared in the Nihon Shoki, the (first) empress of Japan of the Emperor Jinmu who is the legendary first Emperor of Japan. She corresponds to Hime-tatara-isuke-yori hime (比売多多良伊須気余理比売) in the Kojiki. (Note: In Kojiki, her name is written as "比売多多良伊須気余理比売命, Hime-tatara-isukeyori-hime no mikoto", "比売多多良伊須気余理比売" or "伊須気余理比売, Isuke-yori-hime".)

Although details change in various records, her parents are described as a deity (her father), and a daughter of an influential person in the Yamato Province (her mother). She is said to have married Emperor Jimmu and given birth to the second Emperor, Suizei.

== Depiction by Kojiki and Nihon Shoki ==
=== Birth ===
According to the Kojiki, when Kamu-yamato-Iwarebiko (Emperor Jimmu) was searching for a wife, he was told about a woman named Seya-datara-hime (勢夜陀多良比売) who bore a daughter after she was impregnated by Ōmono-nushi (the 'Great Deity of Miwa'). Ōmono-nushi had taken the form of a red arrow and struck Seya-datara-hime's genitals while she was defecating in a ditch.

The future emperor wooed this daughter, named Hoto-tatara-Isusuki-hime (富登多多良伊須須岐比売) (also known as Hime-tatara-isuke-yori hime (比売多多良伊須気余理比売), an altered form of the name which omits the word hoto (ホト, "female genitals")), and took her as his wife.

Like the Kojiki, the main narrative of the first volume of the Nihon Shoki first describes Hime-tatara-isuzu-hime as the offspring of the god of Ōmono-nushi. However, the Nihon Shoki also contains an alternative story which portrays her as the child of the god Kotoshiro-nushi (事代主神) and the goddess Mizoku-hime (溝樴姫) - also known as Tamakushi-hime (玉櫛姫) - conceived after Kotoshiro-nushi transformed himself into a gigantic wani and had sex with her. Likewise, the main narrative in the third and fourth volumes of Nihon Shoki refers to her as the daughter of Kotoshiro-nushi rather than Ōmono-nushi.

Her house was located on the Sai River and near Sai-jinja Shrine, near Mount Miwa.

=== Marriage with Emperor Jimmu ===
According to the Nihon Shoki and other sources, Iwarehiko (later Emperor Jimmu) left the Land of Himuka and made an expedition to the east, and after many battles, established his government in the Yamato region. Iwarehiko built the Palace of Kashiwara in modern-day Kashihara at the foot of Mount Unebi and ascended to the throne as the first Emperor.

Prior to his accession to the throne, Iwarehiko needed to have a consort worthy of being the first Empress. Ōume-no-mikoto, a vassal of Iwarehiko, suggested Hime-tatara-isuzu-hime as a candidate for his wife. According to the Kojiki, Ōkume-no-mikoto explains the story of Hime-tatara-isuzu-hime's birth to Iwarehiko and tells him that she deserved to be his rightful wife. In the Kojiki, there is another story in which Iwarehiko and Ōkume-no-mikoto witnessed seven women on the shore of the Sai River and selected a wife from among them.

Hime-tatara-isuzu-hime had a notable poetic exchange with them, and then Jimmu stayed the night at her house.

According to the Nihon Shoki, their marriage took place on September 24 of the year before his accession. (Note: In Nihon Shoki, he began his search for a consort on August 16th by the lunar calendar, the year before his accession to the throne, and he chose Hime-tatara-isuzu-hime as her consort and married her on September 24.) Hime-tatara-isuzu-hime became Empress when Emperor Jimmu ascended the throne in the following year, 660 BC. (Note: In Nihon Shoki, the year of Emperor Jimmu's accession to the throne is taken as the year of the "辛酉, Shin-Yū, Kanoto-tori" (the year in Sexagenary cycle. See "ja Article"). According to the calculation method established in the Meiji era (1868-1912), taking into account the Shin'i theory (Chinese prophecy theory) and the "Shin-Yu Revolution theory", this year is 660 BC. In the past, this was considered a historical fact, but it is not usually considered a fact at present. For more information, see Japanese imperial year.)

=== After the death of Emperor Jimmu ===
According to the Nihon Shoki, Emperor Jimmu died at the age of 127. Although there are differences in details, the Nihon Shoki and Kojiki describe a succession struggle that occurred among his children after his death.

Before he left for the eastern expedition from the "Land of Himuka", Iwarehiko had married Airatsu-hime (吾平津媛) and they had child. (Note: The "Kojiki" records the names of two of his children. Tagishi-mimi and Kisu-mimi. On the other hand, the Nihon Shoki only mentions the name of Tagishi-mimi no mikoto and does not mention the name of the person corresponding to Kisu-mimi no mikoto.) However, these children were reduced to the status of bastards when Iwarehiko made Hime-tatara-isuzu-hime the rightful Empress. When Emperor Jimmu died, his bastard son, Tagishi-mimi, wanted to succeed to the throne himself. (Note: According to Nihon Shoki and other sources, Tagishi-mimi served under Emperor Jimmu for a long time. but he was described as having a difficult personality and a tendency to "disobey humanity". These descriptions are not necessarily considered to be the true historical facts. When Emperor Suizei succeeded his father Emperor Jimmu, the ultimogeniture took place, which is thought to have been common in ancient Japan. However, later on primogeniture became common, and some people required the proper reasons which could explain the exclusion of Tagishi-mimi from the right of succeeding the throne, this story, in which Tagishi-mimi, an eldest son who is a legitimate inheritant in the primogeniture system, was a bad person and planned the rebellion, could satisfy them.)

In the Kojiki, Tagishi-mimi took the widowed Empress Hime-tatara-isuzu-hime as his wife and tried to assassinate the legitimate children of Emperor Jimmu and Empress Hime-tatara-isuzu-hime. Aware of his plans, Hime-tatara-isuzu-hime wrote two poems to her children to warn them of the danger. (Note: In the Kojiki, "天皇崩後、其庶兄當藝志美美命、娶其嫡后伊須気持余理比売之時、將殺其三弟而謀之間、其御祖伊須気持余理比売之患苦而、以歌令知其御子等" [roughly] After the demise of the Emperor, when the bastard son, Tagishi-mimi, married Isuke-yori-hime, the Empress Dowager, and he wanted to assassinate his three younger brothers, the mother Isuke-yori-hime was distressed and notified this conspiration to her sons by the songs. (Kojiki, 1963, Iwanami bunko, p.101).)

Learning of the plot from their mother's poems, the legitimate sons attacked Tagishi-mimi first and defeated him. Kan-nunakawa-mimi no mikoto (神渟名川耳命, or 神沼河耳命), who played the most active role in the attack, succeeded his father and ascended to the throne as the second emperor, Emperor Suizei. According to the Nihon Shoki, Hime-tatara-isuzu-hime took the title of "Empress Dowager".

Emperor Suizei took Princess Isuzuyori-hime (五十鈴依媛命) as his consort. Isuzu-yori-hime was Hime-tatara-isuzu hime's younger sister and Emperor Suizei's aunt. Other versions of this story claim that Kawamata-hime (Kawamata-bime, 河俣毘売) or Ito-ori-hime (糸織媛) became Emperor Suizei's consort.

=== Children ===
Based on the Nihon Shoki and the Kojiki, Hime-tatara-isuzu-hime and Emperor Jimmu had three children: Hiko-yai (日子八井命), Kan-yai-mimi (神八井耳命), and Emperor Suizei. Hiko-yai is only mentioned in the Kojiki, whereas the other two children are mentioned in both texts. Kan-yai-mimi became the founder of the Ō clan (多氏).

A genealogical tree based on the Kojiki

	Himetataraisuzu-hime		Emperor Jimmu		Ahiratsu-hime
Kamuyaimimi		Hikoyai‡	Emperor Suizei	Tagishimimi	Kisumimi

‡ not in the Nihon Shoki

=== Siblings ===
Himetataraisuzu-hime's mother gave birth to two other children:

- Ama-no-higata-Kushi-no-higata no mikoto (天日方奇日方), alias Kamo-no-kimi - Hime-tatara-isuzu-hime's elder brother. In the Kujiki, he served Emperor Jimmu and became the osu-kuni-no-matsurigoto-mōsu-machigimi (申食国政大夫) [corresponding to Prime Minister].
- Isuzu-yori-hime (五十鈴依媛命) - Hime-tatara-isuzu-hime's sister. She became the Empress of the second emperor, Emperor Suizei.

== Various theories about her lineage ==
In the Nihon Shoki and the Kojiki, although the details of the stories differ, Hime-tatara-isuzu-hime's mother is depicted as the daughter of the influential person (a deity) of the local region (Northern Osaka) and her father is the deity. There is a theory which interprets that by marrying "the child of god" (Hime-tatara-isuzu-hime) as his principal wife, Jimmu, the first Emperor, made use of her in order to legitimize his regime.

The Shoki and Kojiki also depict her maternal family as being people of Mishima (三嶋, 三島) in Settsu (present day Osaka Prefecture), and her paternal family being people of Miwa (美和, 三輪, 三輪山) in the Yamato region. These stories suggest the cooperation of several powerful clans in Kinki region. (Note: 『日本書紀』が説くようにヒメタタライスズヒメの父が事代主神あるいは大国主とするならば、ヒメタタライスズヒメは近畿地方の豪族に加えて出雲地方にもルーツがあるということになる。) There is also a theory which interprets this marriage as showing that the influential persons of Kawachi province (that is, Yamato and Settsu provinces) (Note: Strictly saying, it was the later time when Provinces of Japan such as Yamato and Settsu were established.) might support a foreigner, Iwarehiko (emperor Jimmu), who came from the Himuka (Hyūga province) who marries locally. In addition, another theory interprets that this gain of support through marriage shows the political methods used by Jimmu, with him not only suppressing local powers through military power, but also through conciliatory measures towards those with local influence, as he tried to consolidate his base of control. Finally, there is also an interpretation that this story works to explain how Emperor Jimmu's forces had acquired iron-manufacturing technology.

=== Grandfather: Mizokuhi of Mishima ===
In the Nihon Shoki, her mother is said to be the daughter of Mishima no Mizokuhi (三嶋溝杙), although there are some differences in wording. (Note: Mizokuhi is also written as 溝樴, 溝樴耳神, and 溝杙. In the Kojiki, 湟咋 is used. Also, sometimes, 溝杭 (Shinsen Shōjiroku) or 溝咋 are used.) Since there are some historical records in which "-耳神" (literally: god of ears) is added to his name, there is a theory that this suggests Mizukuhi is an object of worship as a divine being. This god (Mizukuhi) also has the names such as Suetsu-mimi-no-mikoto (陶津耳命), Kamo-taketsunumi-no-mikoto (賀茂建角身命) and Yatagarasu (八咫烏), and is considered as the ancestor god of the Kamo clan and Katsuragi-no-kuni-no-miyatsuko (葛城国造, ja) in the genealogy of the Kamo clan.

The place name "Mishima" is thought to be Mishima county in Settsu Province (Northern Osaka Prefecture). The Engishiki (927) lists Mishima Kamo-jinja (located at Mishima-e, Takatsuki City) and Mizokui-jinja (Ibaraki City), suggesting that "Mizokuhi of Mishima" was worshipped in this area. (Note: Mizokui Shrine refers to Mishima no Mizokuhi as the founder of the shrine and says that the Mishima clan would have been a powerful clan in the ancient Kawachi region.)

In the Edo period, Motoori Norinaga, a scholar of Kokugaku, interpreted this "mizo (groove)" to refer to a toilet built over a stream of water, and this has become a prevailing view. Eiichi Mitani and others have adopted this theory. There is also a theory that the toilet is strongly related to birth rituals. Kazuo Higo insists a different theory, saying that "mizo" means a ditch in a paddy field. Masayuki Tsugita develops this theory, claiming that Mishima-gun (Mishima county) was an ideal place for rice cultivation and that "Mishima no Mizukuhi" was a farming god.

=== Mothers: Tamakushi-hime and Seya-datara-hime ===
Her mother's name is Tamakushi-hime in the Nihon Shoki and Seya-datara-hime in the Kojiki. Both are said to have been known as beautiful women. (Note: In the Nihon Shoki, "是国色之秀者".) (Note: In the Kojiki, "其容姿麗美".)

Motoori Norinaga identifies Seya (勢夜) as Seno village of Heguri-gun in Yamato Province (Sangō Town of Ikoma County in Nara Prefecture).

=== Anecdotes of her birth in Kojiki ===
In the Kojiki, she is said to be the daughter of Ōmono-nushi. (Note: Ōmono-nushi (大物主神) was originally the clan deity of the Mount Miwa. On the other hand, Ōmono-nushi may be another name for Ōkuni-nushi (a descendant of Susanoo), and in Nihon Shoki, Ōmono-nushi is the Mitama of Ōkuni-nushi. Both were originally considered to be different deities.) His birthplace is Mount Miwa in the Yamato region.

She is said to have originally been named Hoto-tatara-isusuki-hime. It is also said that she was a beautiful woman like her mother.

However, she disliked the word "hoto" (female genitalia) and changed her name to Hime-tatara-isuzu-hime. The dropping of the "hoto" may be related to the word being linked to genitals.

== Relation to tatara iron manufacturing ==
There is a theory that the "tatara" (蹈鞴) part of the name Hime-tatara-isuzu-hime is interpreted in connection with tatara iron manufacturing, indicating iron manufacturing in ancient Japan. (Note: The character "鞴" used in Nihon Shoki refers to the bellows used in iron making.) (Note: In modern Japan (before the gathering of the World War II), the origins of iron manufacturing in Japan have been traced back to the "period of gods" (神代, kamiyo or shindai), with episodes in the Nihon Shoki and the Kojiki stating that when Amaterasu hid in Amano-Iwato, iron from "Ama-no-kaguyama (天香山, in Nihon Shoki)" or "Ame-no-kanayama (天金山, in Kojiki)" was used for metalworking. (Nihon Shoki)" or "Amakinzan (Kojiki)". In modern times, it is generally accepted that iron making technology was introduced from mainland China along with rice cultivation, but archaeological evidence is insufficient, and no definitive theory has been established about its origin or age. In terms of literary sources, iron manufacturing is specifically detailed in the Izumono Kuni Fudoki of the 8th century, and it is thought that iron manufacturing was already established in this period.) (Note: Teiichi Suzumoto (Chemical Society of Japan) has argued that the huge Emperor Nintoku's Mausoleum, which dates from around the early 5th century, was probably made possible to build by the establishment of iron tools, and that the Yamato Imperial Court of the time probably had secured tatara iron technology. Fuigo has been excavated from the Higashi Nara Ruins (in Ibaraki City, Osaka Prefecture), and some have linked this to iron manufacturing by the Yamato Court. At this Higashinara site (discovered in 1971), Dōtaku and their casts have been excavated, and it is certain that bronze bells were made there.)

According to Yasunao Kojita, tatara refers to a "tatara furnace", and hoto refers to "fireplace" as well as "female genitalia". (Note: The word "hoto" (溶鉱炉) also refers to "blast furnace".) In other words, the fact that Emperor Jimmu took Hime-tatara-isuzu-hime (= Hime-tatara-isuke-yori-hime = Hoto-tatara-isusuki-hime) as his wife is interpreted as an indication that the royal family controlled the iron and steel industry. Yutaka Yoshino (Japan Literature Association) states that the name "Hoto-tatara-isuzu-hime" refers to a priestess who served the god of molten ore and the blast furnace.

Motoori Norinaga and other early modern Kokugaku scholars did not interpret the word "tatara" in Hime-tatara-isuzu-hime to mean a bellows. In their view, the word tatara is a slang term used by blacksmiths and is dismissed from its ties to steelmaking as it is unsuitable for the name of a noble empress. "Some interpret "tatara" as a derivative of "stand", meaning "stood up (surprised by an arrow in the pubic region)" or "had an arrow put up (in the pubic region).

== Objects of faith ==
Emperor Meiji founded the Kashihara Jingu in 1890, where Emperor Jimmu and Hime-tathara-isuzu-hime are enshrined as the main deities.。

Hime-tatara-isuzu-hime also came to be revered as a "Komori Myōjin (子守明神)" because she saved children, and is enshrined as the main deity at Isagawa Shrine (Honkomori-cho, Nara City, Nara Prefecture). (Note: The Isagawa Shrine is a regent shrine of the Miwasan and Ōmiwa Shrine, which is said to be the hometown of Himetataraisuhime.) In June of every year, the Nitsukawa Shrine holds the "Saegusa Festival" (commonly known as the Yuri festival, 三枝祭, alias ゆり祭り), where Hime-tatara-isuzu-hime is worshipped by offering lilies grown at Mount Miwa.

At the upper reaches of the Sakai River (狭井川), where Himetataraisuzu-hime's parents lived, there is the Sakai Shrine (狭井神社). Here, the main deity is Himetataraisuzu-hime, but also Omononushi (father of Himetataraisuzu-hime according to the Kojiki), Seyadatara-hime (mother of Himetataraisuzu-hime according to the Kojiki), Kotoshirohime (mother of Himetataraisuzu-hime according to the Kojiki) Tamayori-hime, Kotoshironushi (father of Himetataraisukehime according to the Nihon Shoki) are enshrined here.

She is also worshipped at Tsumori Jingu Shrine (Kumamoto Prefecture Kamimashiki District Mashiki Town) and Kosa Shrine (Kosa Town).

== Genealogy ==
A genealogical tree based on the Kojiki

	Himetataraisuzu-hime		Emperor Jimmu		Ahiratsu-hime
Kamuyaimimi		Hikoyai‡	Emperor Suizei	Tagishimimi	Kisumimi

‡ not in the Nihon Shoki

== Notes and references ==
=== Bibliography ===
- Japanese God Name Dictionary, Jinja-shinpoisha, 1994, 1995 (2nd version), ISBN 4-915265-66-8
- "Mythological Hime Tachi: Another Kojiki", Sankei Shimbun, Sankei Shimbun, 2018, ISBN 978-4-8191-1336-6
- "Nihon no Kami Yomiwake Jiten" (An Encyclopedia of Japanese Gods), Kenji Kawaguchi/editor, Kashiwa Shobo, 1999, 2009 (9th printing), ISBN 4-7601-1824-1
- "Kojiki to Nihon no Kami ga Kunderu Hon" (The Book of Ancient Matters and Understanding Japanese Gods), Kunihiro Yoshida, Gakken Publishing, 2015, ISBN 978-4-05-406340-2
- Illustrated Chronicle of the Emperors of Japan, Edited by Masao Mitobe, Akita Shoten, 1989, ISBN 4-253-00297-8
- "Genealogical Compilation", New Edition, Vol. 1, Upper Section, Divine Emperors (1), edited by Yotohiko Iwasawa, Meisho Shuppan, 1996, ISBN 4-626-01541-7
- "A Genealogical Directory of the Empresses of the Rekishi Era" (Bessatsu Rekishi Yomibon 24, Vol. 27, No. 29, 618), Minoru Sato (ed.), Shinninjin Oraisha, 2002
- "Nihonjinmei Daijiten (Shin-Sen Otona-mei Jiten)" Vol.5, Kunihiko Shimonaka/editor, Heibonsha, 1938, 1979 (reprint edition)
- "Nihon Josei Jinmei Jiten (Dictionary of Japanese Women's Biographies), Popular Edition", edited by Noboru Haga, Yasuko Ichibanghase, Kuni Nakajima, Koichi Soda, Japan Book Center, 1998, ISBN 4-8205-7881-2
- "Dictionary of Japanese Historical Personal Names", Nichigai Associates, 1999, ISBN 4-8169-1527-3
- "Dictionary of Japanese Ancient Clans and Personal Names, Popular Edition", Taro Sakamoto and Kunio Hirano, Yoshikawa Kobunkan, 1990, 2010 (Popular Edition, 1st Edition), ISBN 978-4-642-01458-8
- "Nihon Rekishi Chimei Taikei 30 Nara-ken no Chimei" (Japanese Historical Chimei Compendium 30), Heibonsha, 1981.
- "Kadokawa Japanese Dictionary of Geographical Names 29: Nara Prefecture", Kadokawa Japanese Dictionary of Geographical Names Compilation Committee, Rizo Takeuchi, editor, Kadokawa Shoten, 1990, ISBN 4-04-001290-9

Japanese royalty
Preceded by First	Empress consort of Japan; 660–581 BC	Succeeded by Isuzuyori-hime
Preceded by First	Empress dowager of Japan appointed in 581 BC	Succeeded by Isuzuyori-hime
