= Tamakushi-hime =

Japanese deity

- Spouse: Kotoshironushi (Nihon Shoki), or Ōmononushi (Kojiki)
- Issue: Kamo no Okimi, Himetataraisuzu-hime, Isuzuyori-hime, Kamowakeikazuchi-no-mikoto
- Father: Kamotaketsunumi no Mikoto

Tamakushi-hime (玉櫛媛, タマクシヒメ) also known as Mishimanomizokui-hime (三嶋溝熾姫, ミシマノミゾクイヒメ) and Seyadatarahime (セヤダタラヒメ), is a feminine deity who appears in Japanese mythology. She is known as the mother of Himetataraisuzu-hime, the first empress of Japan, Kamo no Okimi, a distant ancestor of the Miwa clan, Kamigamo the deity of Kamigamo Shrine. She is also known as Princess Mishima-Mizo, Seiyadatarahihime, Katsutamayori-biyorihime and Kimikahihime.

== See also ==
- List of Japanese deities
