= Kotoshironushi =

Shinto deity

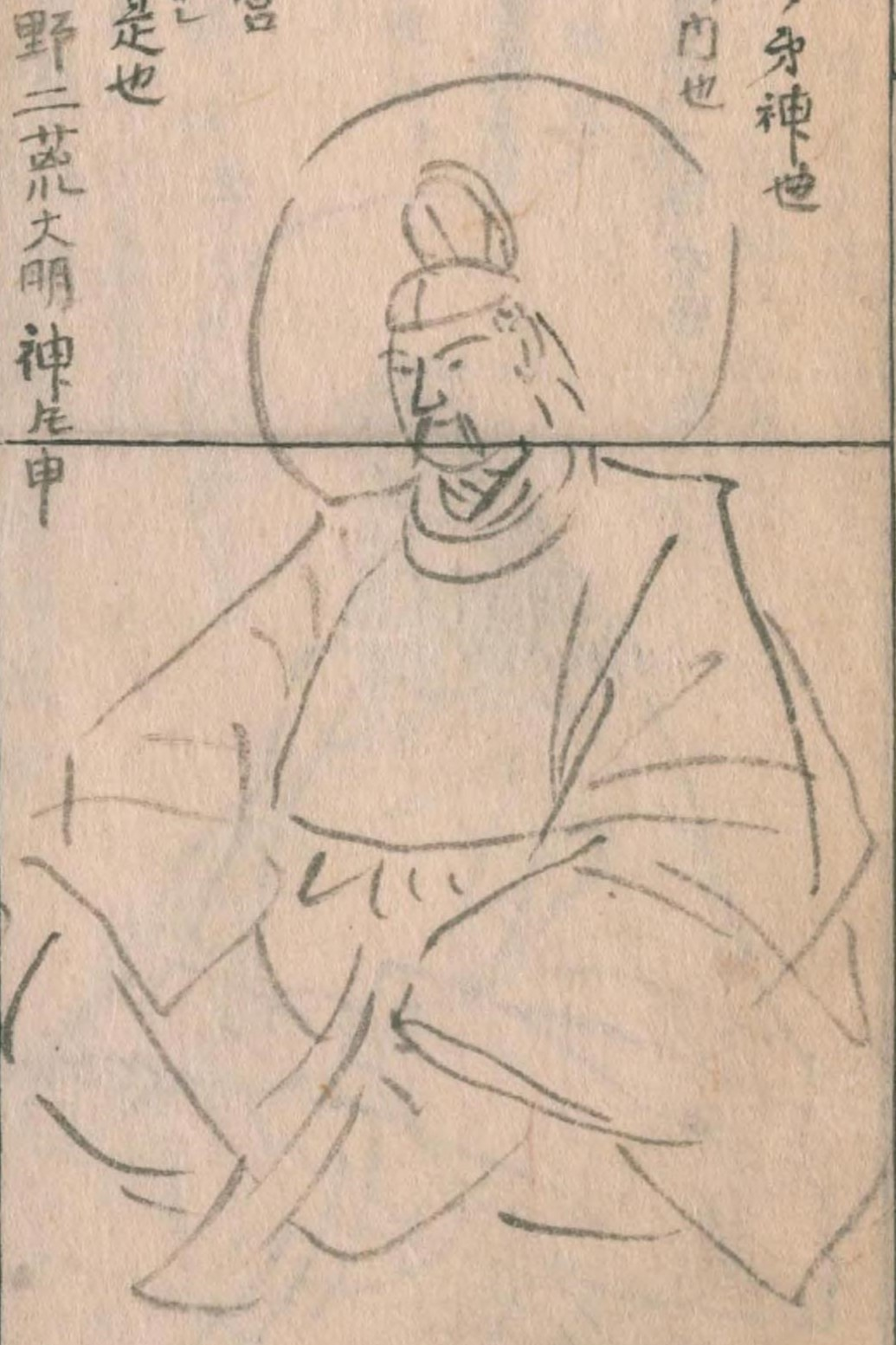

Genealogy
- Parents: Ōkuninushi (father); Nunakawahime, Tagitsuhime (mother)
- Consort: Tamakushi-hime
- Children: Himetataraisuzu-hime, Isuzuyori-hime

Kotoshironushi (事代主神), also known as Yae Kotoshironushi no kami (八重言代主神), is a Shinto kami.

In the Kojiki, Kotoshironushi is the son of Ōkuninushi, the earthly deity of Izumo province. When the heavenly deities sent Takemikazuchi to conquer Izumo, Ōkuninushi deferred the decision over whether to resist to his two sons. Kotoshironushi, who had been fishing at the time of Takemikazuchi's arrival, agreed to accept the rule of the heavenly gods, surrendered his spear and left Izumo. His brother Takeminakata fought with Takemikazuchi and was defeated.

Kotoshironushi is the principal deity of the Asuka shrine, and is associated with the god Ebisu. In mythology, he was an adviser to Empress Jingū during her invasion of Korea. He was also one of the eight deities charged with protecting the Imperial Court. His daughter Himetataraisuzu-hime became the consort of Emperor Jimmu.
