= Yatagarasu =

Mythical three-legged crow

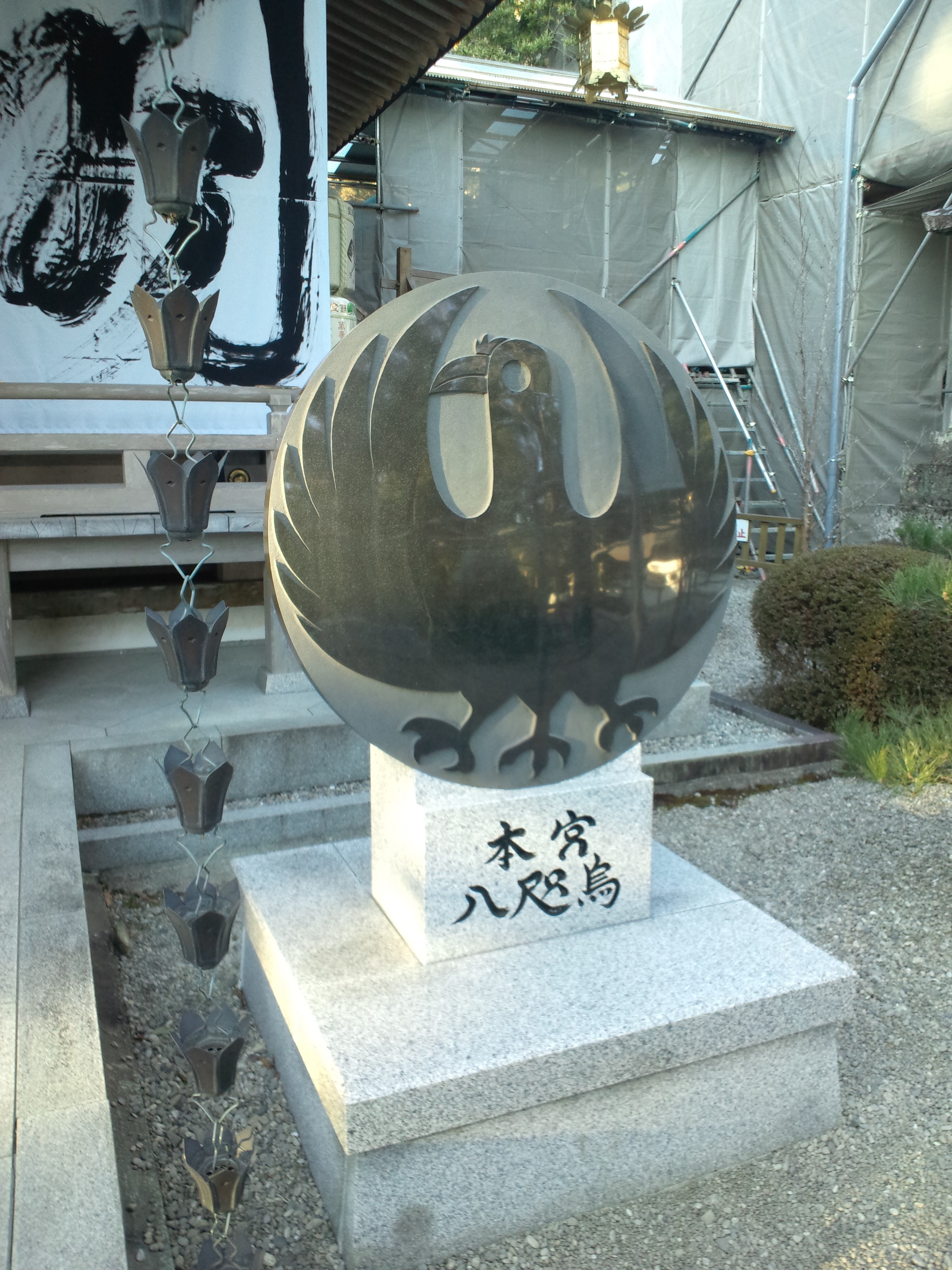
Statue of Yatagarasu at Kumano Hongu Taisha.

Yatagarasu (八咫烏) is a mythical crow and guiding god in Shinto mythology. He is generally known for his three-legged figure, and his picture has been handed down since ancient times. The word means "eight-span crow" and the appearance of the great bird is construed as evidence of the will of Heaven or divine intervention in human affairs.

Yatagarasu as a crow-god is a symbol specifically of guidance. This great crow was sent from heaven by Takamimusubi as a guide for legendary Emperor Jimmu on his initial journey from the region which would become Kumano to what would become Yamato (Yoshino and then Kashihara). It is generally accepted that Yatagarasu is an incarnation of Kamotaketsunumi no Mikoto, but none of the early surviving documentary records are quite so specific.

== Overview ==
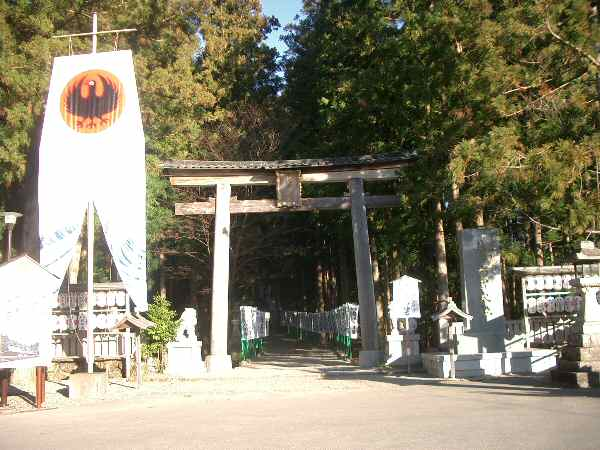
Yatagarasu's Flag next to the Torii of Kumano Hongu Taisha Shrine.

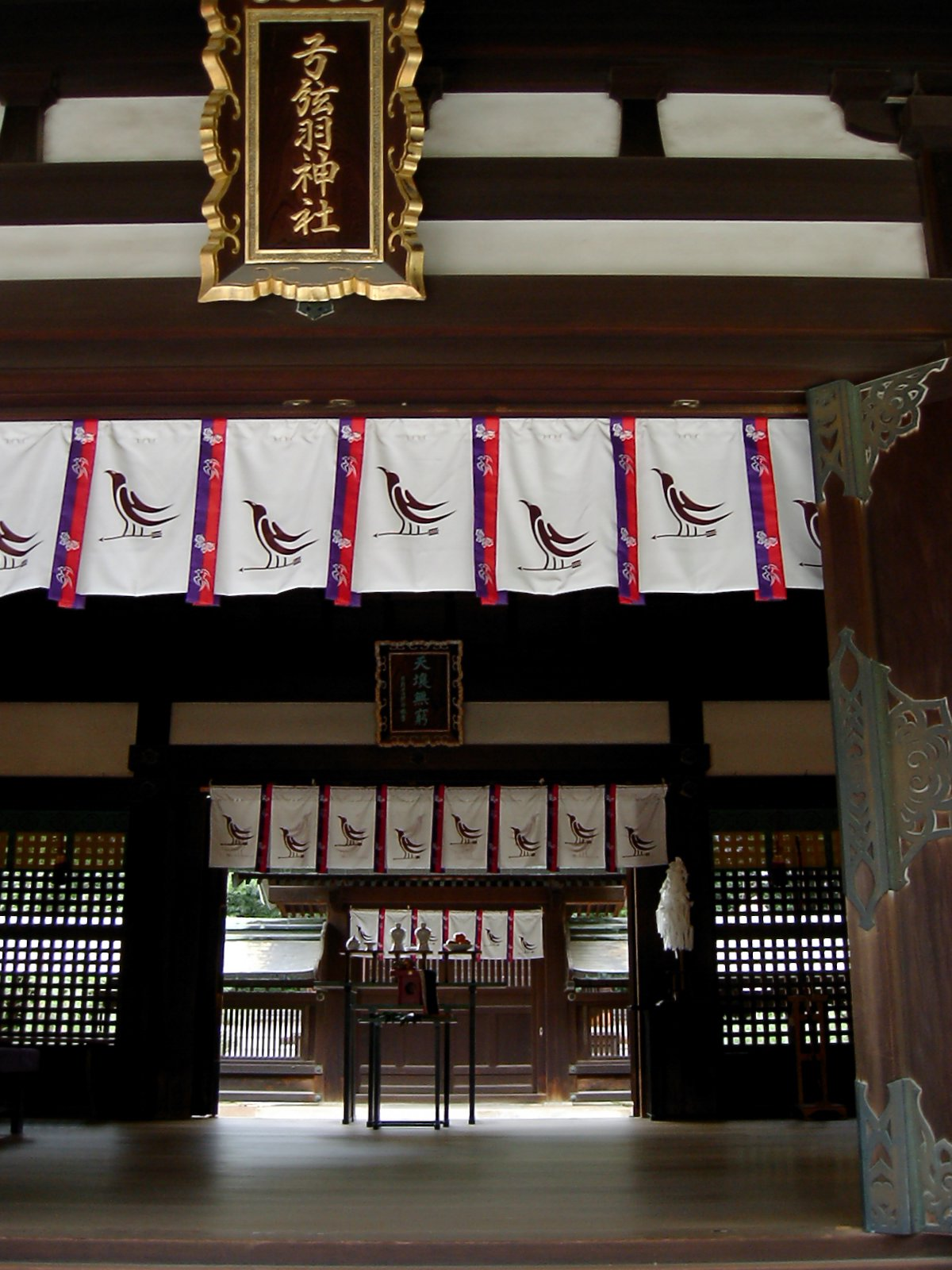
Yatagarasu at Yumigenha Shrine

In Japanese mythology, the Yatagarasu is said to have guided Emperor Jimmu to Kashihara in Yamato, and is believed to be a god of guidance. He is also believed to be an incarnation of the sun.

In the Kojiki, he was sent by Takamimusubi, and in the Nihon Shoki, he was sent by Amaterasu. In the Kojiki, he was sent to ask the brothers Ukausi and Ukausi to return to Emperor Jimmu, but was turned away by the elder brother with a squeaky whistle. On the other hand, in the Nihon Shoki (Chronicles of Japan), Yatagarasu was sent to ask the brothers to return to the emperor. The younger brother, however, was afraid and said, "I hold the heavens against the gods, and I fear for my life. What a crow, you are singing." He offered food to the crow on eight leaf boards. There is a slight difference between the traditions in the two books; for example, the crow returned to Emperor Jimmu and reported to him that his brother Isoshiro was rebellious.

After that, in Nihon Shoki, the merit was worked, and the descendants of Yatagarasu became the lords of Katsuno (Kazuno no Tomori no Agatanushi), and the root was Katsuragi Kokuzo.

In the Nihon Shoki, the Kinshi ("golden kite") saved Emperor Jimmu in his battle with Naganohiko during his eastern expedition. In addition, the Kamo clan is also considered to be the same as the Ame-no-Kanatomi and Kamotaketsunumi no Mikoto. In the genealogy of the Kamo clan, another name for Kamotaketsunumi no Mikoto is Yatagarasu Kamotaketsunumi no Mikoto, even though the Yatagarasu in the Chronicles is said to be Ikutama Anihiko no Mikoto, a contemporary of Emperor Jimmu.

In the three Kumano mountains, crows are considered to be Misaki deities (spirits of the dead that have been appeased; Shinshi). In Kumano Sanzan, Yatagarasu is worshiped as a servant of the Susanoo-no-Mikoto, the Great God of Kumano, and is also a symbol of Kumano. The crow is depicted on the Kumano Gyuuhoin, which was often used as an invocation before the early modern period.

An ata is a unit of length, the length of the thumb and middle finger spread out (about 18 cm), and a yata is 144 cm, but yata here simply means "large".

=== Meaning of three legs ===
There are many theories as to what it means for the Yatagarasu to have three legs. According to Kumano Hongu Taisha, the three legs of the Yatagarasu represent heaven (Tenjin Jigion), earth (natural environment), and man, respectively, indicating that God, nature, and man are brothers born from the same sun. It is also said to represent the authority of the three Kumano clans (Enomoto, Ui, and Fujihaku Suzuki) that once held power in the Kumano region. There is a theory that the meaning of the three legs originates from the fact that the number representing the sun has been three since ancient times, and that it has the same meaning as the Mitsunoe of the crest of shrines (Himekoso shrines) such as Usa Jingu that worship the sun goddess Hime. However, neither Kojiki nor Nihon Shoki mentions that the Yatagarasu has three legs, and the earliest reference to the Yatagarasu as having three legs is Wamyō Ruijushō, written in the middle of the Heian period (around 930), and it is thought that at that time Yatagarasu became identified with the three-legged crow, a mythical bird of China and Korea, and became three-legged. It is possible that the belief in the bird as a messenger of the gods, which originally existed in Japanese mythology, was fused with the Chinese belief in the spiritual bird of the sun.

=== Chinese "three-legged crow" ===
In Chinese mythology, the three-legged crow lives in the sun. Based on the theory of the five elements of yin and yang, two is yin and three is yang, and three legs are more suitable to symbolize the sun than two legs. The legs represent the sunrise, daylight, and sunset. In China, the three-legged crows have appeared in books since the Former Han period (3rd century BCE), and have been depicted on artifacts found in the tombs of kings. The triskelion, an abstract design composed of three spirals, and its derivative, the three-legged crow, are widespread designs.

== History ==
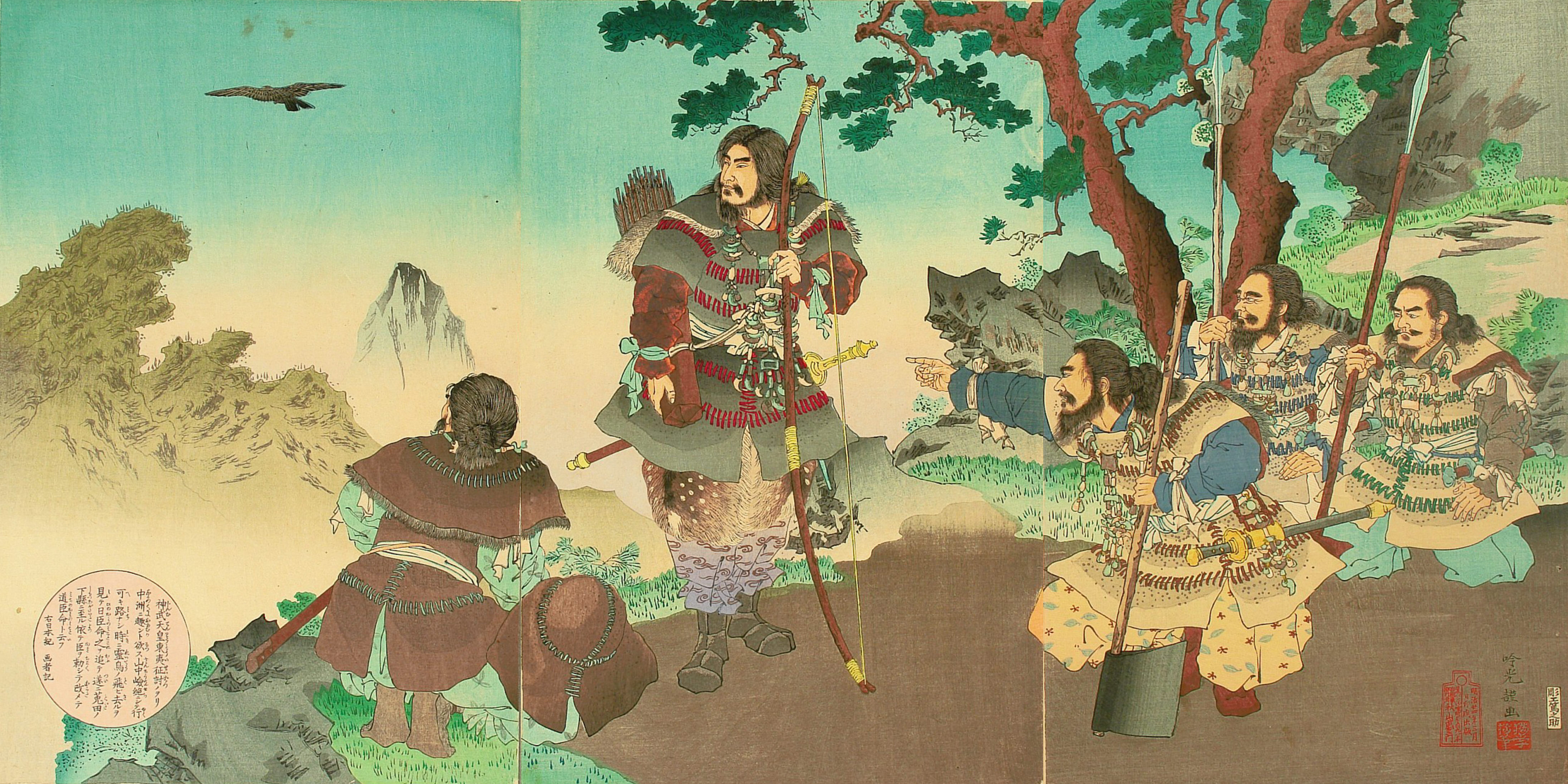
Emperor Jimmu being led by the Yatagarasu (Andatsu Ginkō, "Emperor Jimmu's Eastern Expedition")

As mentioned above, three-legged crow lore can be found in ancient Chinese cultural regions. If it is in China, it is the Golden Crow. If in the Korean peninsula, it is depicted on a burial mound in the area where Goguryeo (1st–6th century BC) once stood (present-day North Korea). The people of Goguryeo believed that three-legged crows lived in the sun and turtles lived in the moon. On the other hand, there is a theory that they did not spread to the southern part of the Korean Peninsula (present-day South Korea).

In the Japanese myth of the "Eastern Expedition", Yatagarasu is said to have served as a guide for Emperor Jimmu as he attempted to advance from the Seto Inland Sea to the Kinki region. Emperor Jimmu initially attacked Osaka from the west and was defeated, so he thought that he, as a descendant of Amaterasu, the sun goddess, should attack from the east to the west with his back to the sun, instead of from the west to the east. Therefore, guided by Yatagarasu, they decided to attack from the vicinity of the present-day Shingu, largely bypassing the Kii Peninsula, and then went through Yoshino to Kashihara, where they established the Yamato Imperial Court.

In mythology, Yatagarasu is also a messenger of the god Kumano. In the reign of Emperor Kōrei, a hunter named Chiyokane, who was chasing wild boar in the mountains, was led by a crow to a large tree. When he pointed an arrow at the light, he heard a voice saying, "I am the god of Kumano." He built a shrine dedicated to the deity and became the chief administrator of the three Kumano mountains. This was the moment when the god of Kumano first appeared to the people.

Yatagarasu is recorded in the Kojiki (Records of Ancient Matters), the Nihonshoki (Chronicles of Japan), and the Enki Shiki (Records of Ancient Matters), as well as in the wall paintings of the Kitorazuka burial mound, the mural paintings of the stone chamber in the side hole of the Chinshikizuka burial mound (Fukuoka Prefecture), the mirror excavated from the Takabe No. 30 jet in Kisarazu City, Chiba Prefecture, and the pedestal of the Tamamushi zuriko (a wooden box) at Horyuji Temple. According to Shinsengumi Roku, the Yatagarasu is an incarnation of Kamotaketsunumi no Mikoto, the great grandson of Emperor Takehito, who later became the ancestor of the Kamo no Agatonushi. The Yatagarasu Shrine in Haibara, Nara Prefecture, Uda City, has Kengakuminomikoto as its deity.

In the Sengoku period, it was also the family crest and flag of the Suzuki family, who ruled Zoga-shu in Kii Province. At the end of the Edo period, Takasugi Shinsaku wrote a tojitsu in which he wrote, "I want to kill the crows of three thousand worlds and take a morning nap with the Lord." This is because it was believed that if a man broke a promise written on the back of a Kumano Gyudama Hōin tag, one (or three) Kumano ravens would die and the person who broke the promise would also be punished, so he wrote, "Even if I break all my promises to other men and let all the Kumano ravens die, I want to take a morning nap with you. This is an expression of a prostitute who chooses to sleep in the morning, risking her own life.

== Asteroids ==
Takao Kobayashi, an astronomer from Oizumi, Gunma Prefecture, named the Asteroid he discovered in 1997 (provisional code1997 AY1), which he named "Yatagarasu", and registered it as (9106) Yatagarasu on 9 August in 2004.

== Gallery ==
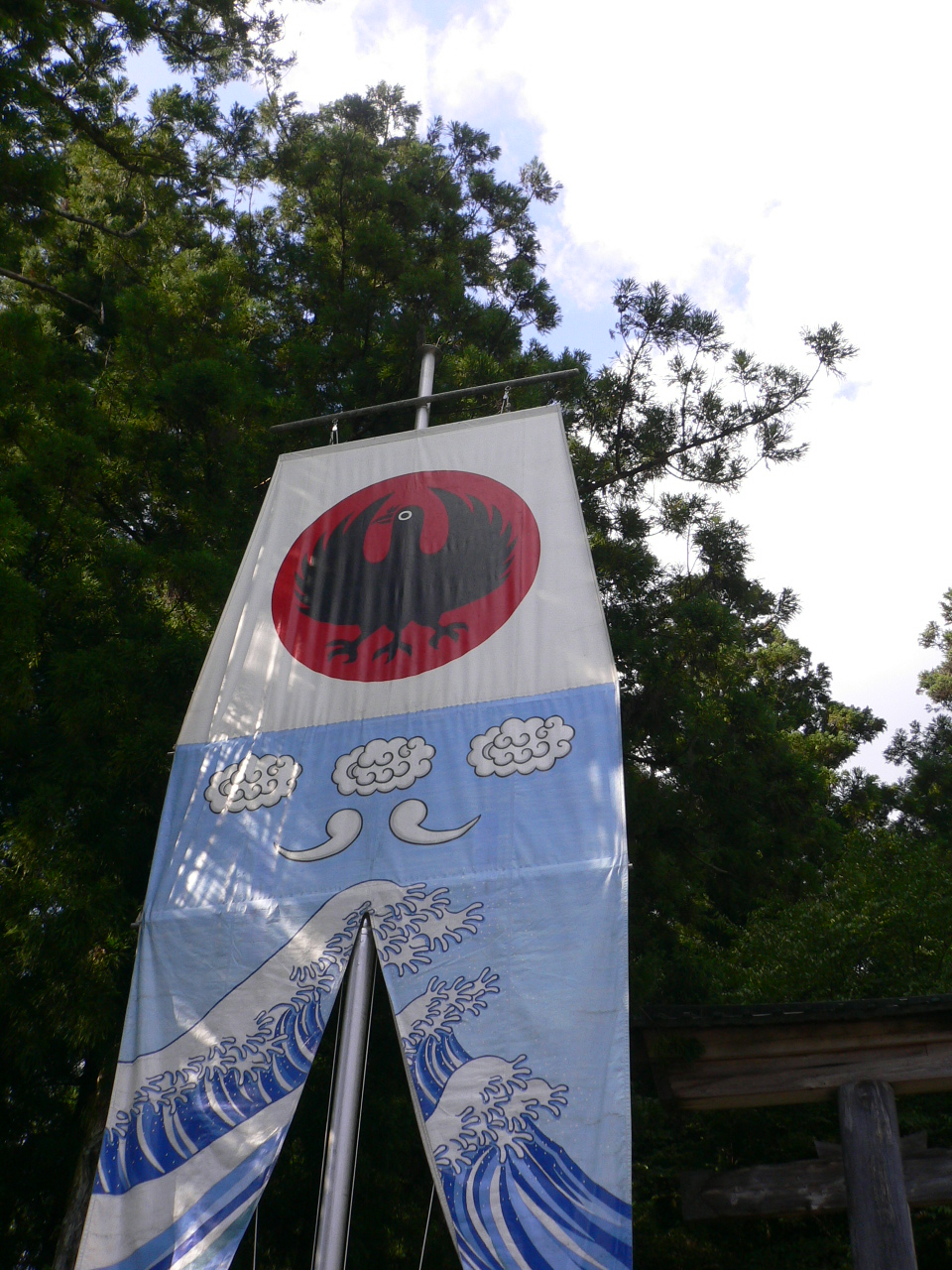
Banner and Yatagarasu Kumano Hongu Taisha

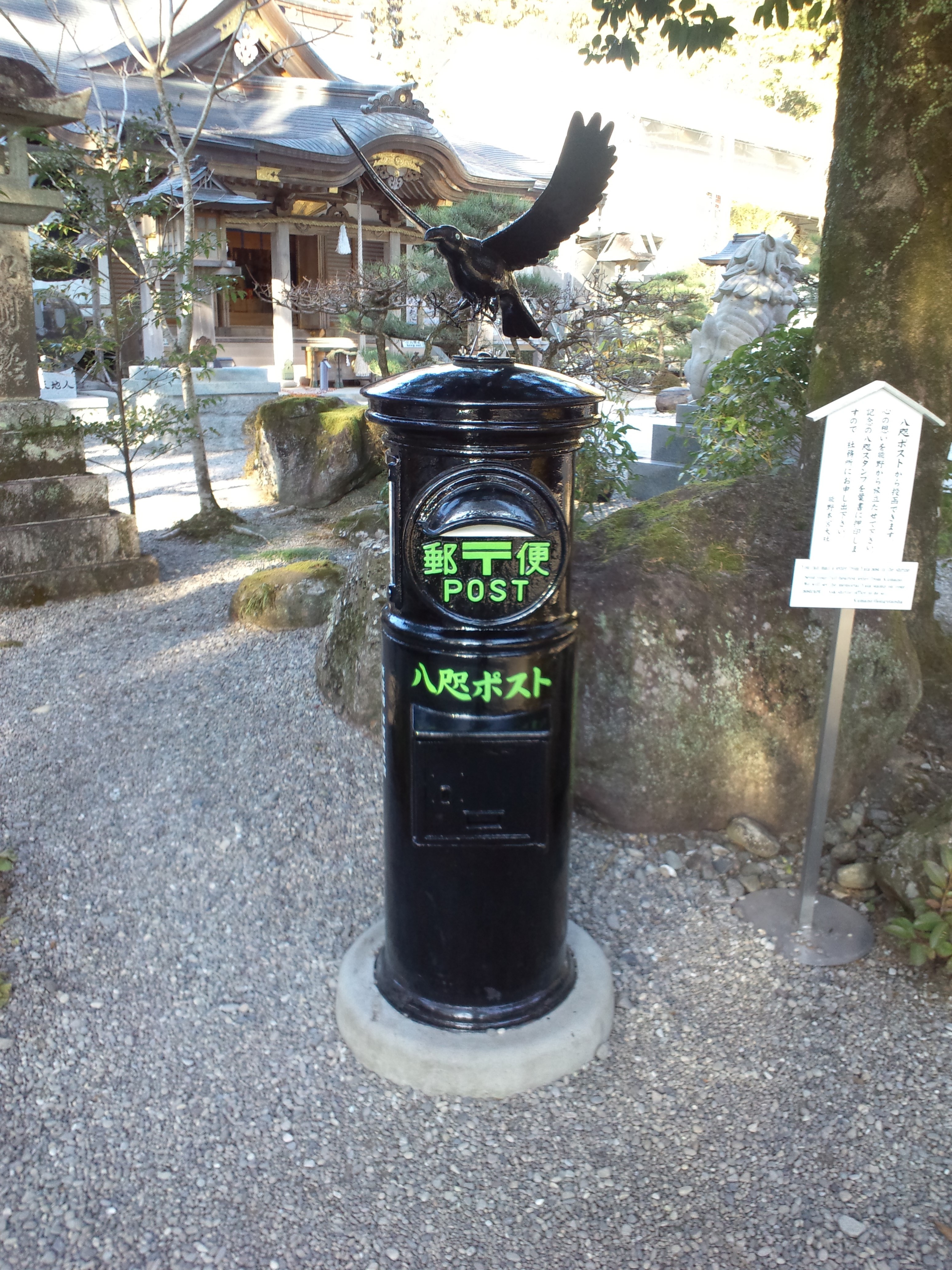
Yatagarasu Post Kumano Hongu Taisha

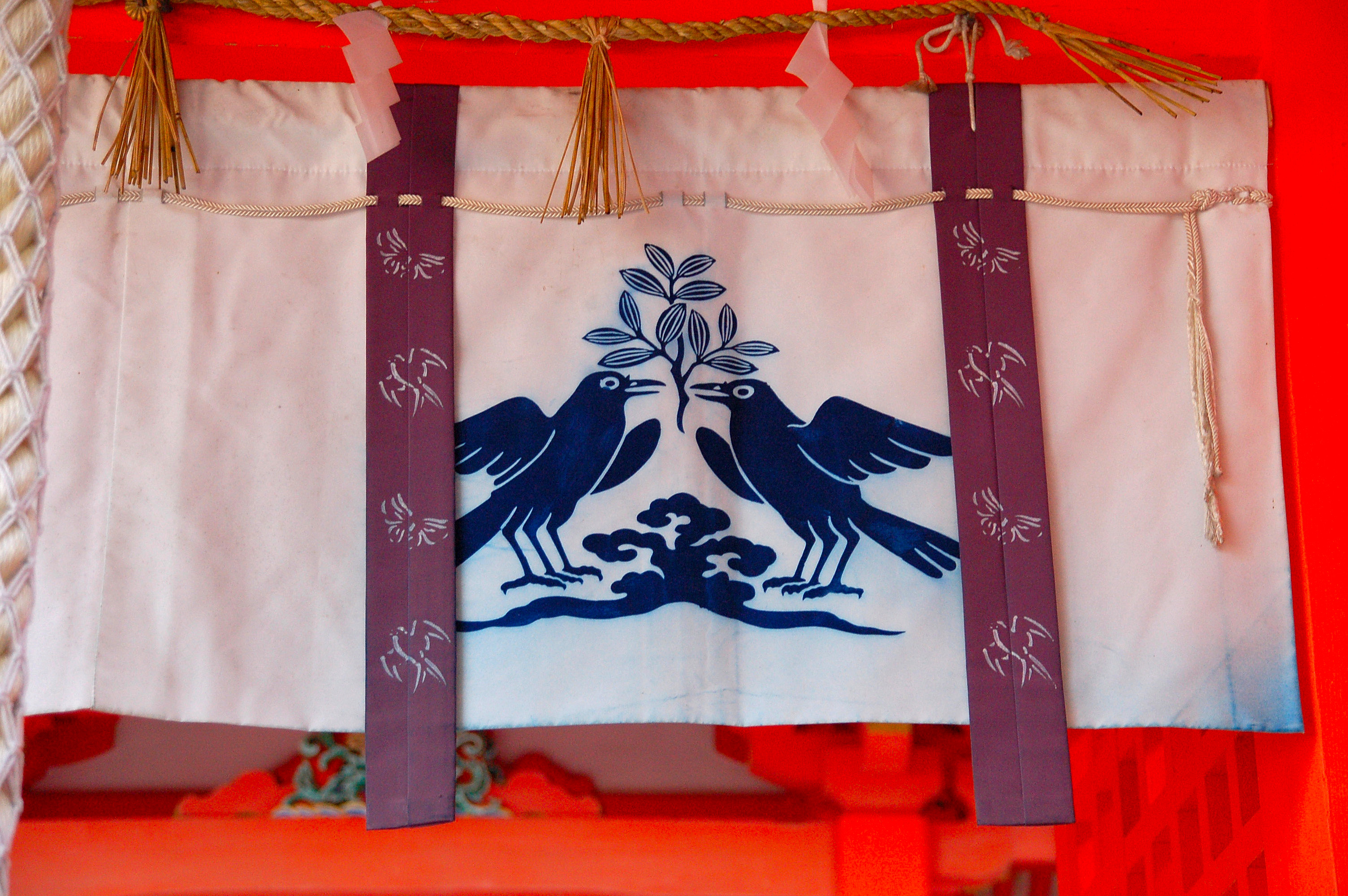
Yatsugi U, Kumano Nachi Taisha

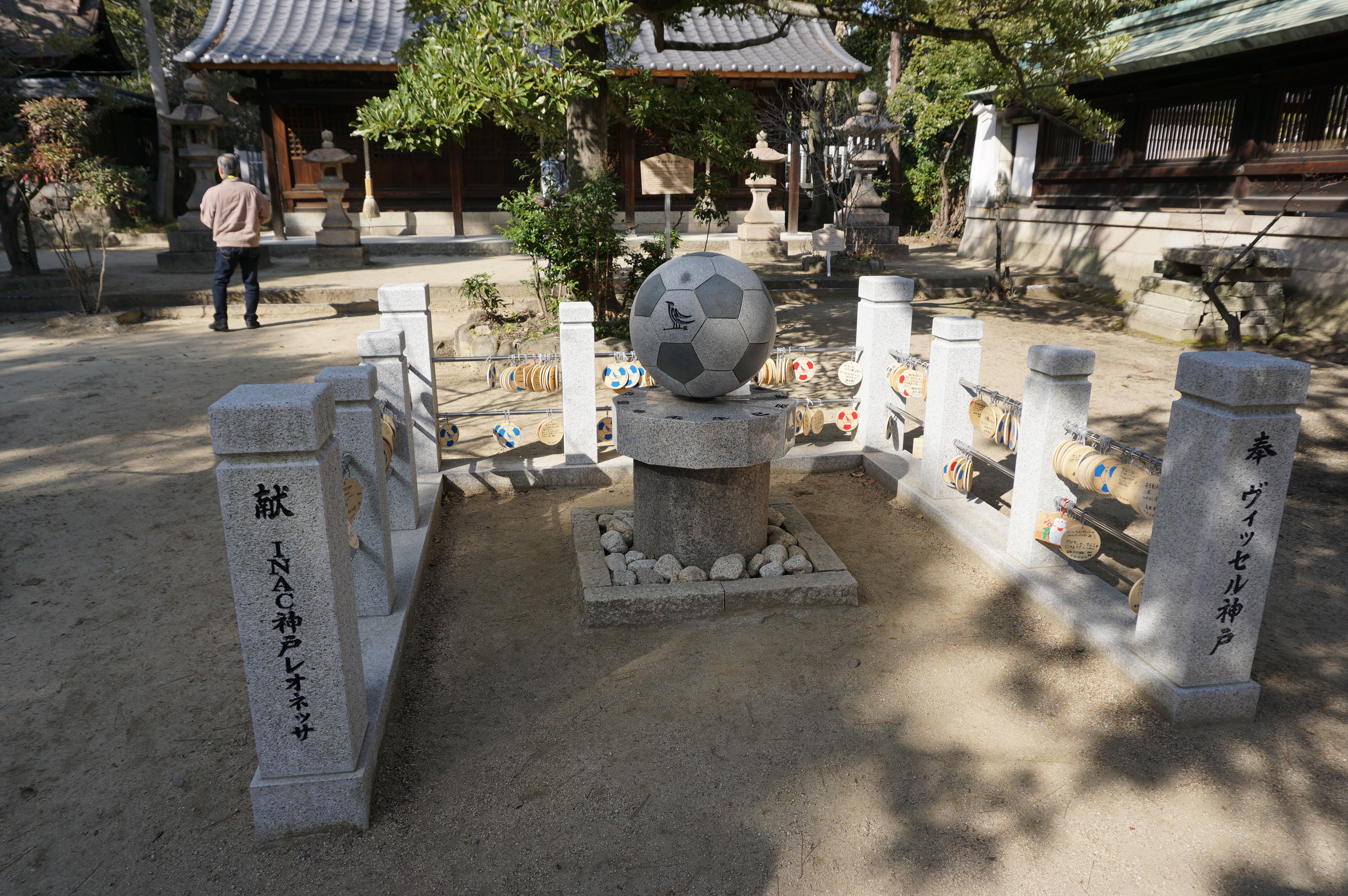
A soccer ball object in the shrine grounds, Yuzuruha Shrine

== See also ==
- 9106 Yatagarasu
- Crow palace
- Golden crow – The three-legged crow, which is the design of the current Emperor's rituals, is generally believed not to be Yatagarasu, but some people put a question mark on it or believe that it has been identified or confused with Yatagarasu.
- Hongū
- Huginn and Muninn, the Crow twin-familiars of Odin AllFather, King of the Gods in Norse mythology.
- List of Japanese deities
- Nachikatsuura Kumano Nachi Taisha
- Shingū, Wakayama Kumano Hayatama Taisha
- Subterranean Animism, 2008 bullet hell scrolling shoot 'em up video game featuring Yatagarasu
- Sunspot
- Totsukawa – A mountain village in southern Yamato, with the Yatagarasu as its Totem.
- Turul – a similar bird in Hungarian mythology
- Yatagarasu (association)
- Yatsugatake Shrine
- Yuzuruha Shrine

== Footnotes ==
=== Sources ===
- Ponsonby-Fane, Richard Arthur Brabazon (1953). Studies in Shintō and Shrines: Papers Selected from the Works of the Late R.A.B. Ponsonby-Fane, LL. D. Dr. Richard Ponsonby-Fane Series. Vol. 1. Kyoto: Ponsonby Memorial Society. OCLC 374884.
- Ponsonby-Fane, Richard Arthur Brabazon (1963). The Vicissitudes of Shinto. Dr. Richard Ponsonby Fane Series. Vol. 5. Kyoto: Ponsonby Memorial Society. OCLC 36655.
