= Emperor Jimmu =

Legendary first emperor of Japan

Emperor Jimmu 神武天皇
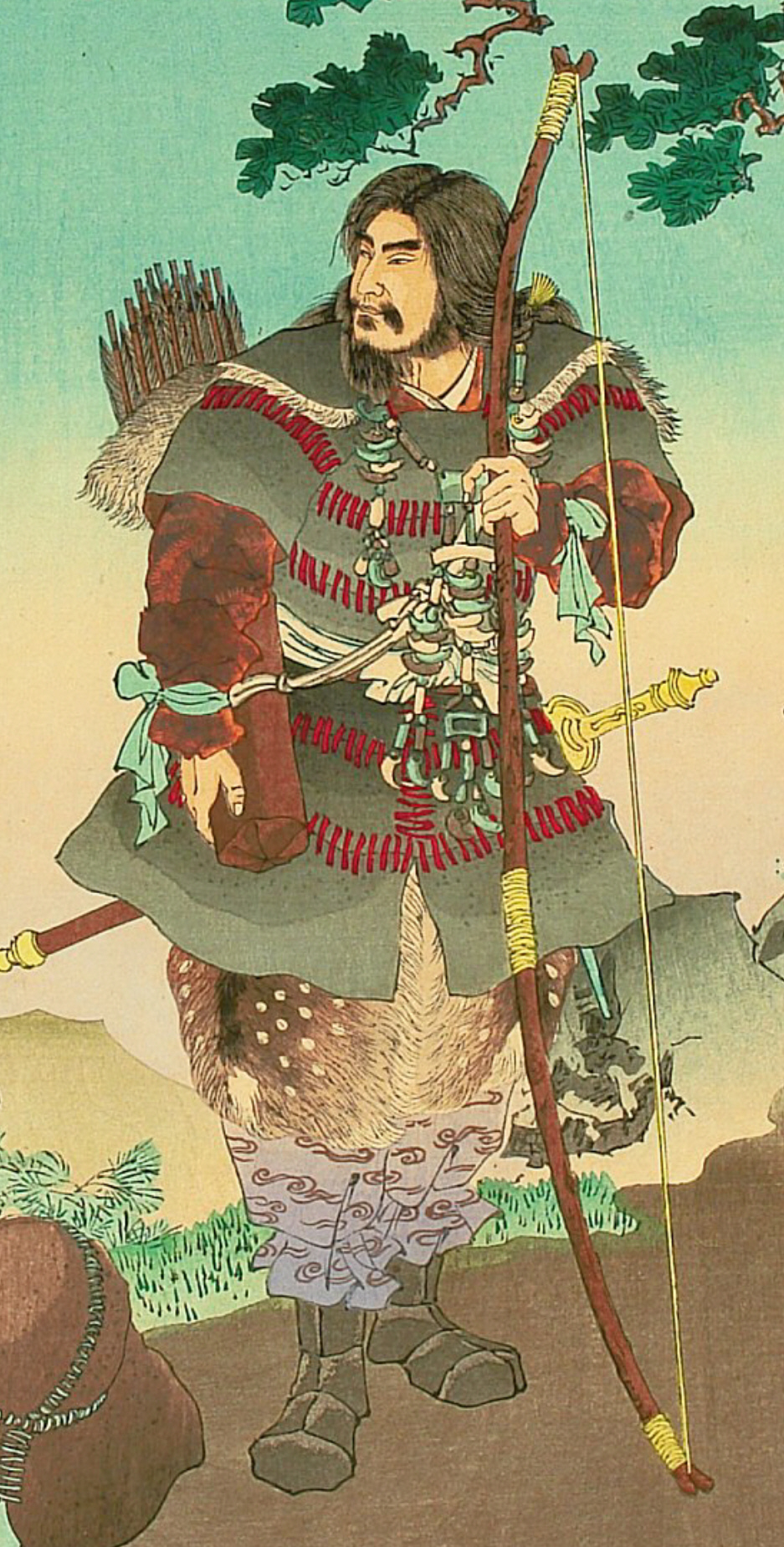
- Emperor Jimmu with his emblematic self bow, the kinshikyū (金鵄弓), (Note: So named after the incident in which a golden kite (金鵄, kinshi) landed on the tip of the upright bow during the final rout of Nagasunehiko's army.) by Adachi Ginkō, 1891

Emperor of Japan
- Reign: 660–585 BC (traditional)
- Successor: Suizei
- Born: Hikohohodemi (彦火々出見); 711 BC or 721 BC eastern Tsukushi-no-shima (now Kyushu)
- Died: 585 BC (aged 137 or 126) possibly Kashihara, Nara
- Burial: Unebi-yama no ushitora no sumi no misasagi (畝傍山東北陵) (Kashihara, Nara)
- Spouses: Ahiratsu-hime; Himetataraisuzu-hime
- Issue: Tagishimimi-no-Mikoto; Kisumimi; Hikoyai-no-Mikoto; Kamuyaimimi; Emperor Suizei
Posthumous name
- Chinese-style shigō: Emperor Jimmu (神武天皇); Japanese-style shigō: Kamu-yamato Iware-biko no Sumeramikoto (神日本磐余彦天皇)
- Father: Ugayafukiaezu
- Mother: Tamayori-hime
- Religion: Shinto

Emperor Jimmu

Japanese name
- Kanji: 神武天皇
Transcriptions
- Romanization: Jinmu-tennō

Emperor Jimmu (神武天皇, Jinmu Tennō; Japanese pronunciation: [dʑiꜜm.mɯ (ten.noː), dʑim.mɯ ten.noꜜː]) was the legendary first emperor of Japan according to the Nihon Shoki and Kojiki. His ascension is traditionally dated as 660 BC. In Japanese mythology, he was a descendant of the sun goddess Amaterasu, through her grandson Ninigi, as well as a descendant of the storm god Susanoo. He launched a military expedition from Hyūga near the Seto Inland Sea, captured Yamato, and established this as his center of power. In modern Japan, Emperor Jimmu's legendary ascension is marked as National Foundation Day on February 11.

There is little to no evidence to suggest that Jimmu existed; he is regarded by most modern scholars as a legendary figure.

== Name and title ==
Jimmu is recorded as Japan's first ruler in two early chronicles, Nihon Shoki (721) and Kojiki (712). Nihon Shoki gives the dates of his reign as 660–585 BC. In the reign of Emperor Kanmu (737–806), the eighth-century scholar Ōmi no Mifune retroactively designated rulers before Emperor Ōjin as tennō (天皇; "heavenly sovereign"), a Japanese pendant to the Chinese imperial title Tiān-dì (天帝), and gave several of them including Jimmu their posthumous names. Prior to this time, these rulers had been known as Sumera no mikoto (皇尊, "divine highness") or Ōkimi (大君, "great lord"). This practice had begun under Empress Suiko, and took root after the Taika Reforms with the ascendancy of the Nakatomi clan.

Both the Kojiki and the Nihon Shoki give Jimmu's name as Kamu-yamato Iware-biko no Mikoto (神倭伊波礼琵古命) or Kamu-yamato Iware-biko no Sumeramikoto (神日本磐余彦天皇). Iware indicates a toponym (an old place name in the Nara region) whose precise purport is unclear. '-no-Mikoto' is an honorific, indicating divinity, nobility, or royalty.

Among his other names were: Wakamikenu no Mikoto (若御毛沼命), Kamu-yamato Iware-biko hohodemi no Mikoto (神日本磐余彦火火出見尊) and Hikohohodemi (彦火火出見).

The Imperial House of Japan traditionally based its claim to the throne on its putative descent from the sun-goddess Amaterasu via Jimmu's great-grandfather Ninigi.

== Legendary narrative ==
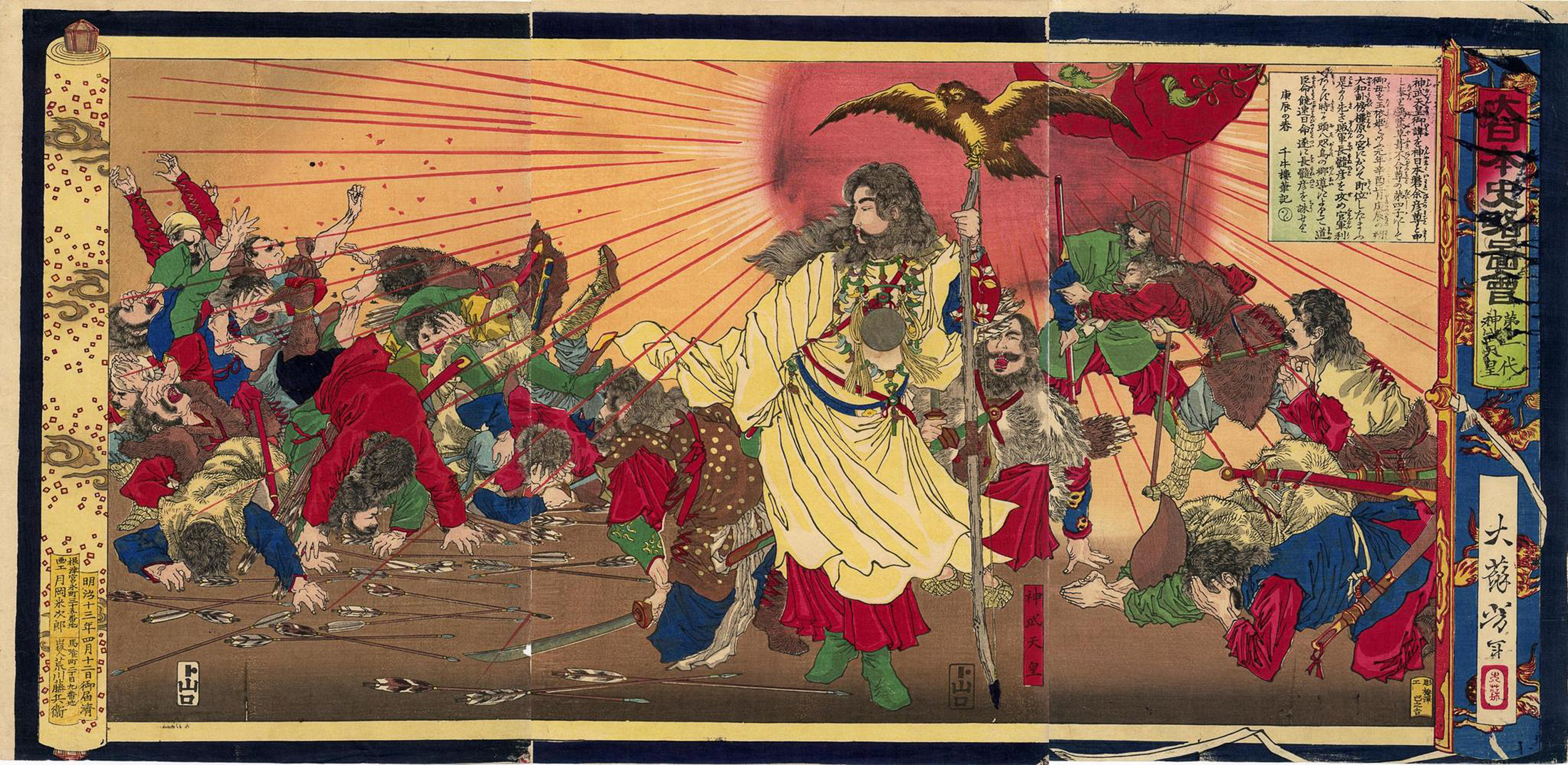
Emperor Jimmu, ukiyo-e by Tsukioka Yoshitoshi (1880)

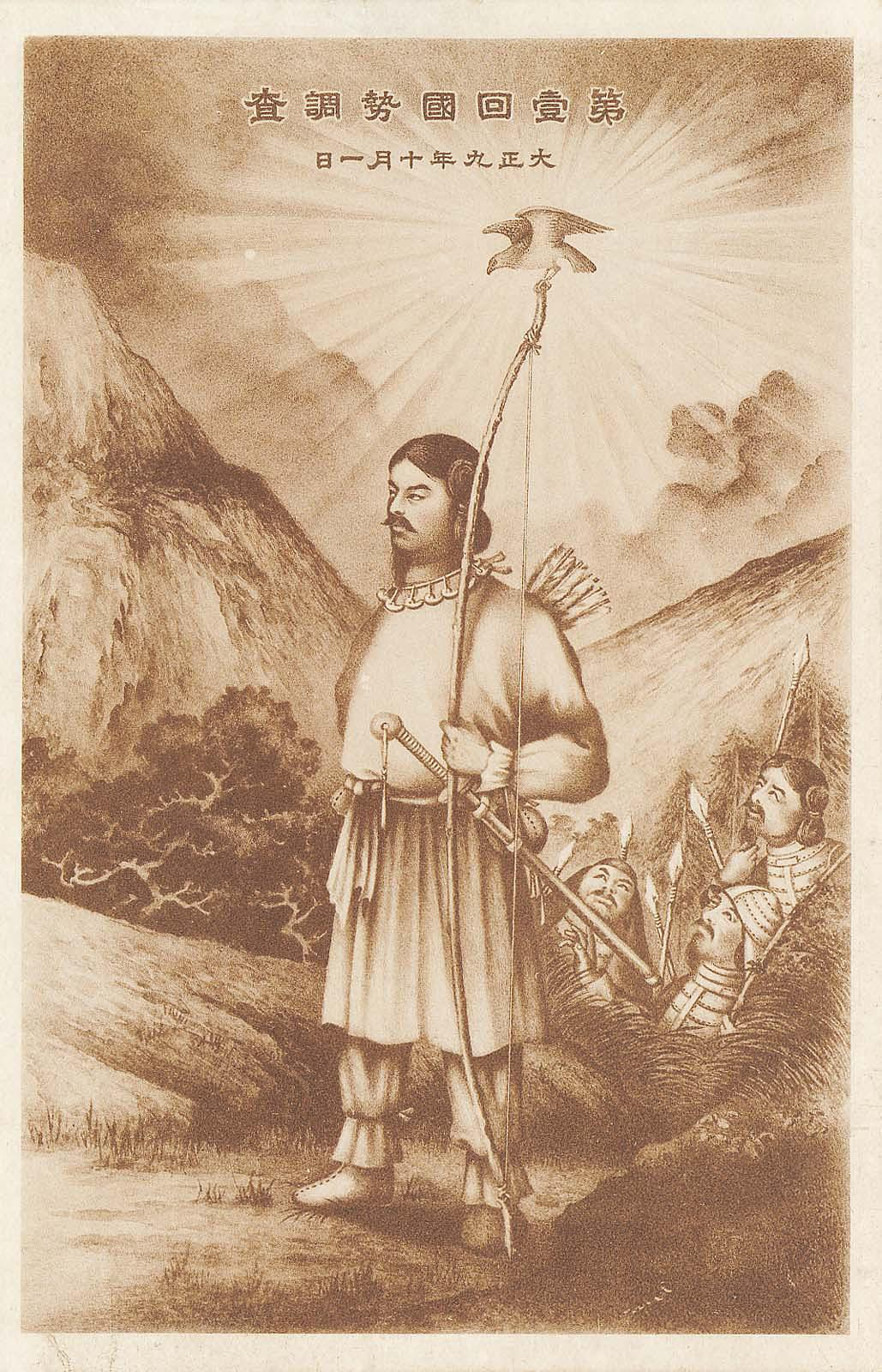
Emperor Jimmu, from the first National Census book 1920 in Japan

In Japanese mythology, the Age of the Gods is the period before Jimmu's accession.

The story of Jimmu seems to rework legends associated with the Ōtomo clan (大伴氏), and its function was to establish that clan's links to the ruling family, just as those of Suijin arguably reflect Mononobe tales and the legends in Ōjin's chronicles seem to derive from Soga clan traditions. Jimmu figures as a direct descendant of the sun goddess, Amaterasu via the side of his father, Ugayafukiaezu. Amaterasu had a son called Ame no Oshihomimi no Mikoto and through him a grandson named Ninigi-no-Mikoto. She sent her grandson to the Japanese islands where he eventually married Konohana-Sakuya-hime. Among their three sons was Hikohohodemi no Mikoto, also called Yamasachi-hiko, who married Toyotama-hime. She was the daughter of Ryūjin, the Japanese sea god. They had a single son called Hikonagisa Takeugaya Fukiaezu no Mikoto. The boy was abandoned by his parents at birth and consequently raised by Tamayori-hime, his mother's younger sister. They eventually married and had four sons. The last of these, Hikohohodemi, became Emperor Jimmu.

=== Migration ===
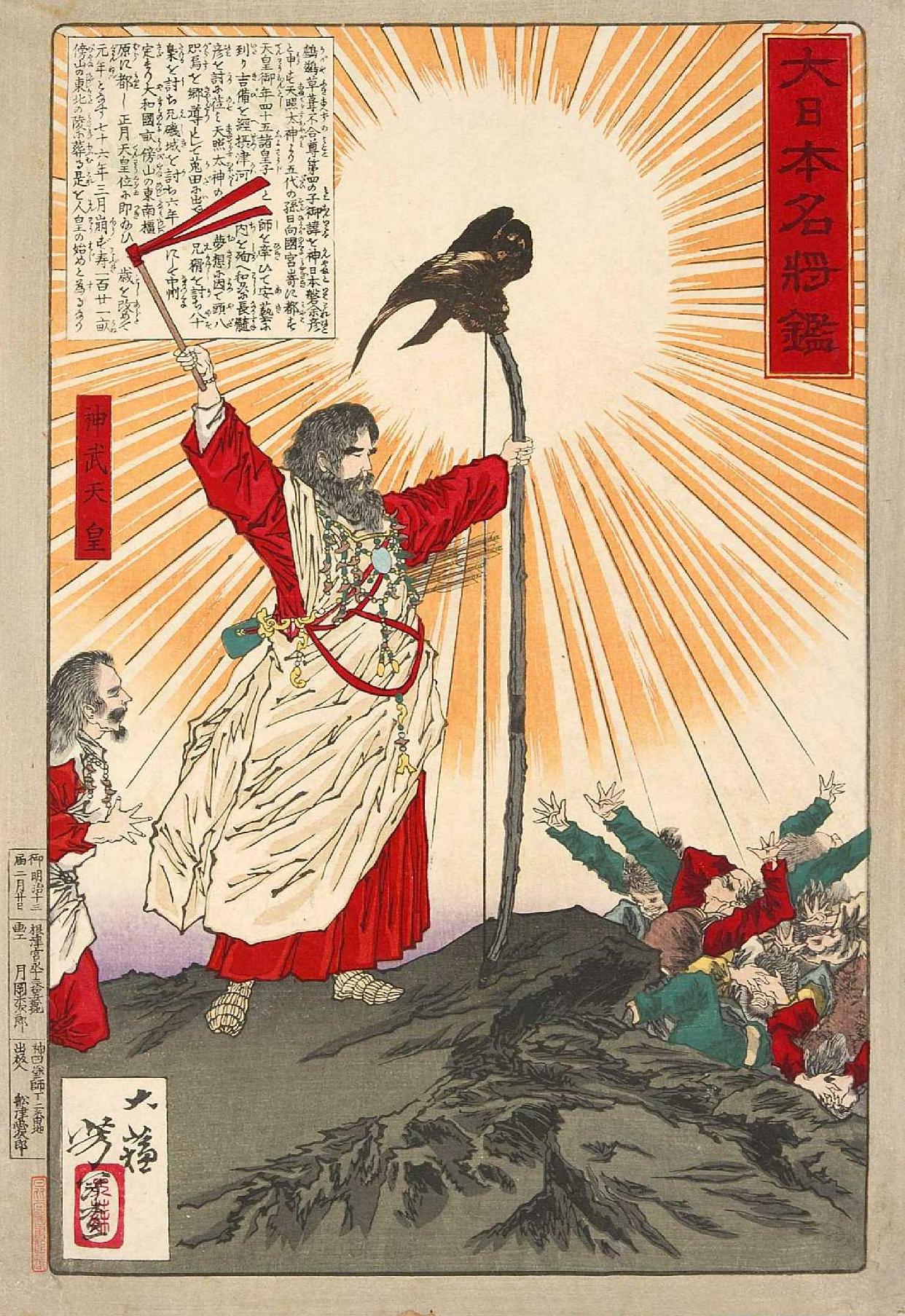
Depiction of a bearded Jimmu with his bow and the golden kite. This 19th-century artwork was painted by Tsukioka Yoshitoshi.

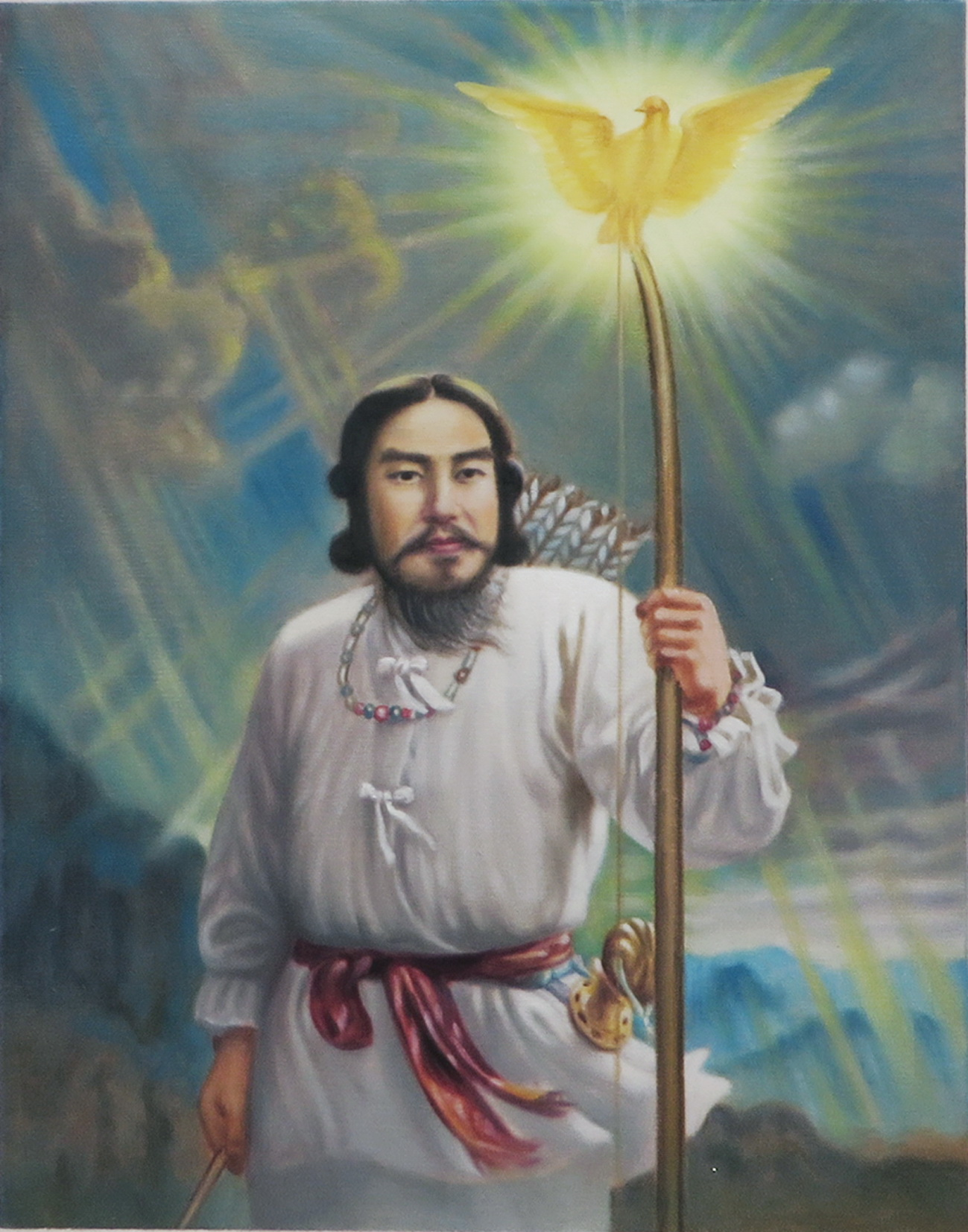
Painting of Jimmu by Renzō Kita in 1940

According to the chronicles Kojiki and Nihon Shoki, Jimmu's brothers Itsuse no Mikoto, Inahi no Mikoto, and Mikeiri no Mikoto were born in Takachiho, the southern part of Kyūshū in modern-day Miyazaki Prefecture. They moved eastward to find a location more appropriate for administering the entire country. Jimmu's older brother, Itsuse no Mikoto, originally led the migration, and led the clan eastward through the Seto Inland Sea with the assistance of local chieftain Sao Netsuhiko. As they reached Naniwa (modern-day Osaka), they encountered another local chieftain, Nagasunehiko ("the long-legged man"), and Itsuse was killed in the ensuing battle. Jimmu realized that they had been defeated because they battled eastward against the sun, so he decided to land on the east side of Kii Peninsula and to battle westward. In Japanese legend, during battle with Nagasunehiko a kinki ("golden kite") landed on Jimmu's bow and emitted rays of dazzling light, helping Jimmu defeat his enemies. They reached Kumano, and, with the guidance of a three-legged crow Yatagarasu (八咫烏; lit. 'eight-span crow'), they moved to Yamato. There, they once again battled Nagasunehiko and were victorious. The record in the Nihon Shoki of Emperor Jimmu states that his armed forces defeated a group of Emishi (蝦夷; lit. 'shrimp barbarians') before his enthronement. The Emishi were an ethnic group who lived in Honshu, particularly the Tōhoku region.

In Yamato, Nigihayahi, who also claimed descent from the Takamagahara gods, was protected by Nagasunehiko. However, when Nigihayahi met Jimmu, he accepted Jimmu's legitimacy. At this point, Jimmu is said to have ascended to the throne of Japan. Upon scaling a Nara mountain to survey the Seto Inland Sea he now controlled, Jimmu remarked that it was shaped like the "heart" rings made by mating dragonflies, archaically akitsu (秋津). A mosquito then tried to steal Jimmu's royal blood but since Jimmu was a god incarnate Emperor, akitsumikami (現御神), a dragonfly killed the mosquito. Japan thus received its classical name the Dragonfly Islands, akitsushima (秋津島).

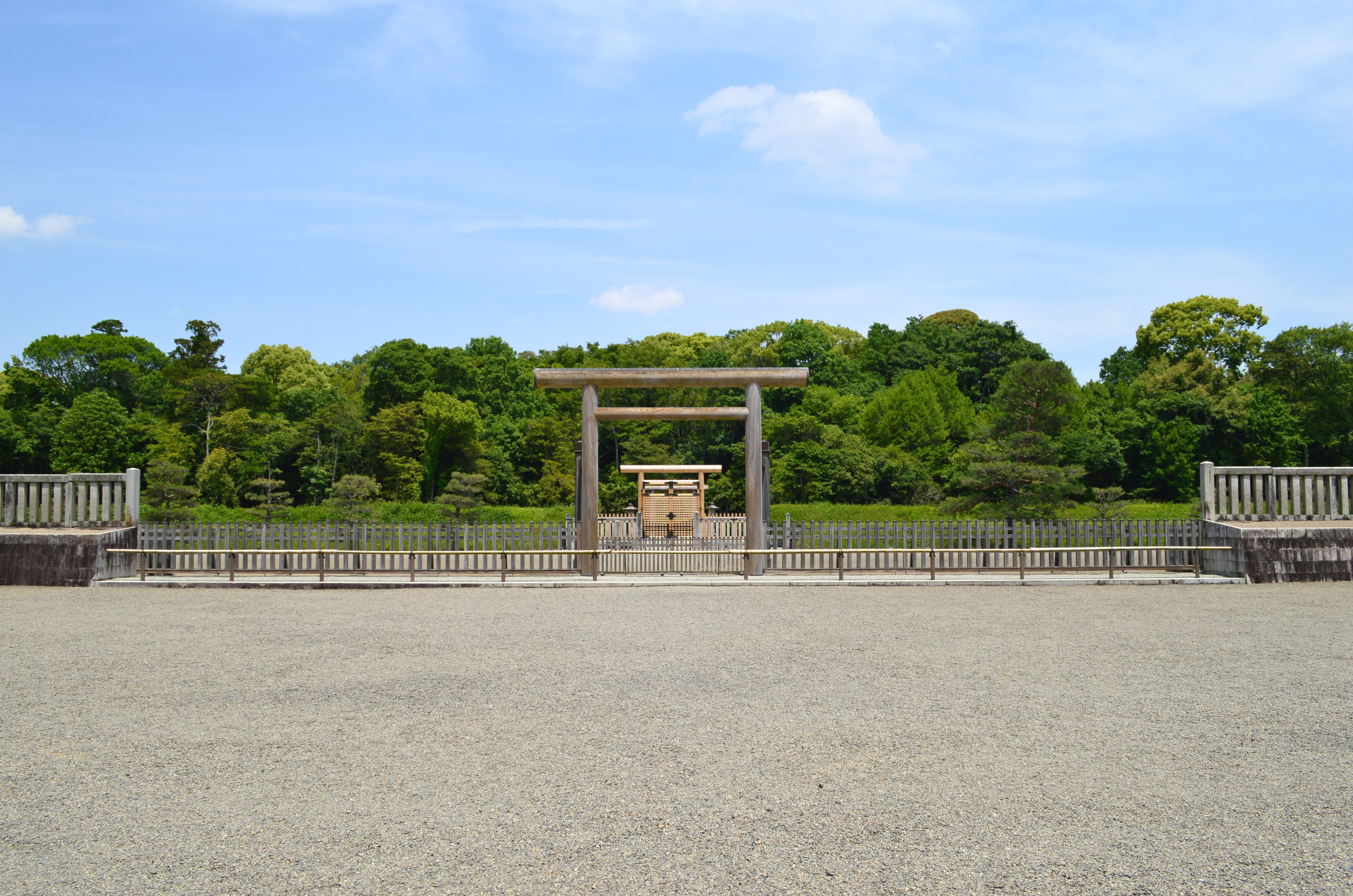
Unebi Goryō, the mausoleum of Emperor Jimmu in Kashihara City, Nara Prefecture

According to the Kojiki, Jimmu died when he was 137 years old. The Emperor's posthumous name literally means "divine might" or "god-warrior". It is generally thought that Jimmu's name and character evolved into their present shape just before the time in which legends about the origins of the imperial dynasty were chronicled in the Kojiki. There are accounts written earlier than either Kojiki and Nihon Shoki that present an alternative version of the story. According to these accounts, Jimmu's dynasty was supplanted by that of Ōjin, whose dynasty was supplanted by that of Keitai. The Kojiki and the Nihon Shoki then combined these three legendary dynasties into one long and continuous genealogy.

The traditional site of Jimmu's grave is near Mount Unebi in Kashihara, Nara Prefecture.

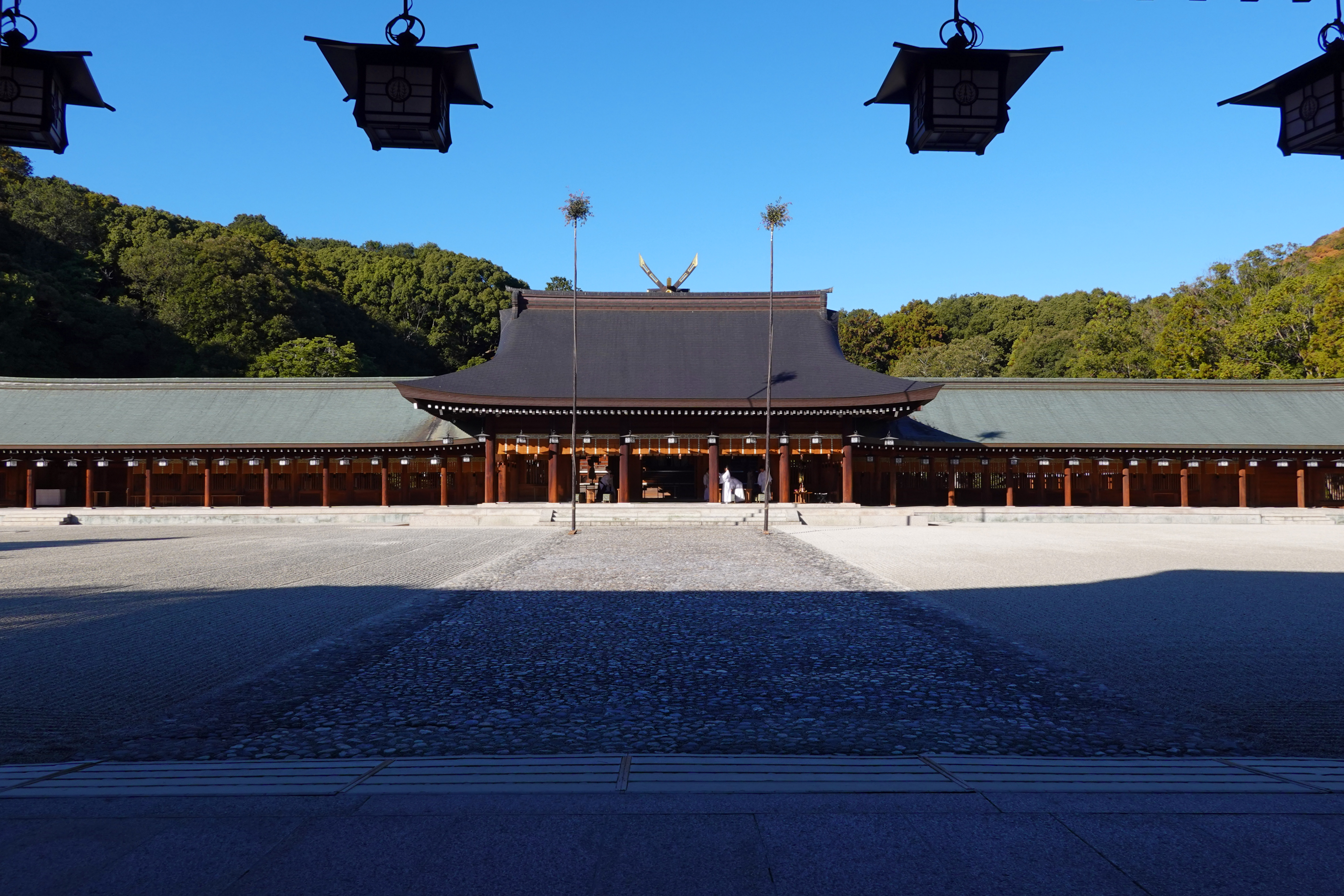
The inner prayer hall of Kashihara Shrine in Kashihara, Nara, the principal shrine devoted to Jimmu

== Imperial Era veneration ==
Veneration of Jimmu was a central component of the imperial cult that formed following the Meiji Restoration. In 1873, a holiday called Kigensetsu was established on February 11. The holiday commemorated the anniversary of Jimmu's ascension to the throne 2,532 years earlier. After World War II, the holiday was criticized as associated with the "emperor system." too closely It was suspended from 1948 to 1966, but later reinstated as National Foundation Day.

Between 1873 and 1945, an imperial envoy sent offerings every year to the supposed site of Jimmu's tomb. In 1890 Kashihara Shrine was established nearby, on the spot where Jimmu was said to have ascended to the throne.

Before and during World War II, expansionist propaganda made frequent use of the phrase hakkō ichiu, a term coined by Tanaka Chigaku based on a passage in the Nihon Shoki discussing Emperor Jimmu. Some media incorrectly attributed the phrase to Emperor Jimmu. For the 1940 Kigensetsu celebration, marking the supposed 2,600th anniversary of Jimmu's enthronement, the Peace Tower was constructed in Miyazaki.

That same year, numerous stone monuments relating to key events in Jimmu's life were erected around Japan. The sites at which these monuments were erected are known as Emperor Jimmu Sacred Historical Sites.

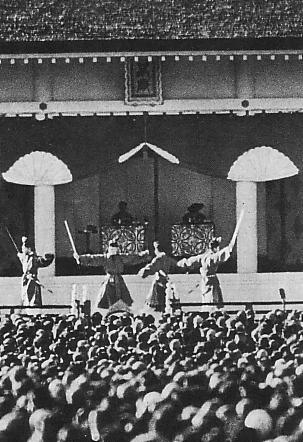
124th Emperor Hirohito and Empress Nagako presiding the celebration of the 2600th anniversary of mythical foundation of the Empire in November 1940

== Historicity ==
Since after World War II, when the prohibition on questioning the Kojiki and the Nihongi was lifted, documentary research in China and archaeological research in Japan has undermined much of the information in both the Kojiki and Nihon Shoki. No evidence has been found for Jimmu's existence. Today most modern scholars agree that the traditional founding of the imperial dynasty in 660 BC is a myth and that Jimmu is legendary. Emperor Sujin's historicity is considered possible by historians, while Emperor Kinmei is the first verifiable historical figure in the imperial lineage.

The dates of Jimmu reigning from 660 BC to 585 BC are improbable. The founding date is inaccurate because political unity in Japan most likely occurred at the end of the third century or the beginning of the fourth century A.D., at a point marked by the appearance of the Kofun tumuli. According to Dr. Lu, the year 660 BC was probably selected by the writers of Nihon Shoki to put the founding of Japan on a kanoto-tori year.

However, the stories of Jimmu may reflect real events of the mid to late Yayoi period. According to historian Peter Wetzler, Jimmu's conquest of Osaka and Nara may reflect an actual event. Still, the dates and many of the details are fictitious. Historian Kenneth G. Henshall stated that Jimmu's conquest may also reflect a time when the Yayoi people from continental Asia immigrated in masses starting from Kyushu and moving eastward during the Yayoi period.

Some scholars suggest that there may have been a real person behind Jimmu. He could have been a local ruler who conquered the area near Kashihara after 62 BC. Some scholars believe he was present in Miyazaki during the first century BCE while others say he was there during the third or fourth century AD. Nevertheless, there is a high probability that there was either a foreign or indigenous dynasty in the vicinity of Miyazaki Prefecture during the Kofun period.

According to Louis Frédéric, it’s unclear if he existed and he may have been a fusion of emperors Sujin and Keitai. The Japanese historian Ino Okifu identifies Emperor Jimmu with the Chinese alchemist and explorer Xu Fu, a hypothesis supported by certain traditions in Japan and regarded as possible by some modern scholars. The Yayoi period, during which significant changes in Japanese metallurgy and pottery occurred, started around the time of his supposed arrival. However, the legend of Xu Fu's voyage also has numerous inconsistencies with the linguistic and anthropological history of Japan.

== Consorts and children ==
- Consort: Ahiratsu-hime (吾平津媛), Hosuseri's (Ninigi-no-Mikoto's son) daughter
  - First son: Prince Tagishimimi (手研耳命)
  - Son: Prince Kisumimi (岐須美美命)
  - Daughter: Princess Misaki (神武天皇)
- Empress: Himetataraisuzu-hime (媛蹈鞴五十鈴媛), Kotoshironushi's daughter
  - Son: Prince Hikoyai no mikoto (日子八井命)
  - Second son: Prince Kamuyaimimi no mikoto (神八井耳命; d.577 BC)
  - Third son: Prince Kamununakawamimi (神渟名川耳尊), later Emperor Suizei

=== Family tree ===
A genealogical tree based on the Kojiki

	Himetataraisuzu-hime		Emperor Jimmu		Ahiratsu-hime
Kamuyaimimi		Hikoyai‡	Emperor Suizei	Tagishimimi	Kisumimi

‡ not in the Nihon Shoki

== See also ==
- 2600th Anniversary Celebrations of the Japanese Empire
- Emishi people
- Japanese imperial year
- Jōmon period
- King Arthur, a legendary figure from Britain who founded the country similar to Emperor Jimmu
- Modern system of ranked Shinto shrines
- Origins of Japan
- National Foundation Day
- Order of the Golden Kite
- Yayoi period

== Bibliography ==
- Aston, William G. (1896). Nihongi: Chronicles of Japan from the Earliest Times to A.D. 697 [Nihon Shoki]. London: The Japan Society of the UK. ISBN 978-0524053478.
- Brown, Delmer M. and Ichirō Ishida, eds. (1979). Gukanshō: The Future and the Past. Berkeley: University of California Press. ISBN 978-0-520-03460-0; OCLC 251325323
- Brownlee, John S. (1997). Japanese Historians and the National Myths, 1600–1945: The Age of the Gods. Vancouver: University of British Columbia Press. ISBN 0-7748-0645-1
- Chamberlain, Basil Hall (1919). "The Kojiki". Evinity Publishing. OCLC 1882339.
- Earhart, David C. (2007). Certain Victory: Images of World War II in the Japanese Media. Armonk, New York: M. E. Sharpe. ISBN 978-0-7656-1776-7
- Kitagawa, Joseph Mitsuo (1987). On Understanding Japanese Religion. Princeton: Princeton University Press. ISBN 978-0-69107313-2, 978-0-69110229-0; OCLC 15630317
- Nussbaum, Louis Frédéric (2002). Japan Encyclopedia. Harvard University Press. ISBN 978-0674017535.
- Ponsonby-Fane, Richard Arthur Brabazon (1959). The Imperial House of Japan. Kyoto: Ponsonby Memorial Society. OCLC 194887
- Titsingh, Isaac (1834). Annales des empereurs du Japon [Nihon Ōdai Ichiran] (in French). Paris: Royal Asiatic Society of Great Britain and Ireland. OCLC 5850691.
- Varley, H. Paul (1980). A Chronicle of Gods and Sovereigns: Jinnō Shōtōki of Kitabatake Chikafusa [Jinnō Shōtōki]. New York: Columbia University Press. ISBN 978-0231049405. OCLC 59145842.
- Hall, John (1971). Japan: From Prehistory to Modern Times. ISBN 4-8053-0276-3.

Emperor Jimmu Imperial House of Japan
Regnal titles
New creation	Emperor of Japan	Succeeded by Emperor Suizei
