= Kamo =

The name Kamo may refer to the following:

== Places ==
=== Japan ===
(Note: kamo (鴨), is the common word for duck in Japanese, but the following names do not necessarily mean duck and are not necessarily written with that character.)

- Kamo, Niigata
- Kamo District, Gifu
- Kamo District, Hiroshima
- Kamo District, Shizuoka
- Kamo, Kyoto
- Kamo, Okayama
- Kamo, Shimane
- Kamo, Shizuoka
- Kamō, Kagoshima
- Kamo River in Kyoto (Japanese: 鴨川,賀茂川)
- A number of minor rivers (Japanese: 鴨川,加茂川) listed under Kamogawa (disambiguation)
- Kamo shrines, which may mean Kamigamo shrine or Shimogamo shrine in Kyoto
- Kamo, a place name within Higashimiyoshi, Tokushima known for Kamo's giant camphor tree

=== Rest of the world ===
- Gavar, Armenia - formerly Kamo
- Kamo, Armenia
- Kamo, Azerbaijan
- Te Kamo, a town in the Northland Region of New Zealand
- Kamo River (Russia)

== People ==
- Kamo (Bolshevik) (1882–1922), real name of Simon Ter-Petrosian, Armenian-Georgian Bolshevik
- Kamo, nickname of former New Zealand sportsman Ian Jones (rugby union, born 1967)
- Kamo clan, surname of a Japanese clan (賀茂, 加茂, 鴨, 加毛)
  - Kamo Wake-ikazuchi, ancestral deity of the clan and Shinto deity of thunder
  - Kamo no Chōmei (1155–1216), an author
  - Kamo no Mabuchi (1697–1769), a poet
  - Shu Kamo (born 1939), a football player and manager
  - Kamo no Yasunori (917–977), an onmyōji
- first name (given name) of Serizawa Kamo (1826?–1863), commander of the Shinsengumi warriors
- Kamo (character), from the anime Doomed Megalopolis — the apprentice of Yasumasa Hirai
- Kamo (character) from the videogame The Legend of Zelda: The Wind Waker
- Kamo Mphela (born 1999), a Amapiano artist
- Kamo WW (born 2002), a South African Amapiano singer and influencer

== Cuisine ==
- kamo in Japanese cuisine may refer to the poultry product of the wild duck, the domesticated duck, or very frequently the crossbred variety known as aigamo. It may appear on menu items such as kamonanban (hot soba).
- kamo is one of Eggplant#Cultivars, of a large round shape; it is one of the better known "Kyoto vegetables" or Kyoyasai.

== Other ==
- Kamo (play), Noh play featuring the deity.
- Kamo language, a Savannas language of Nigeria

== See also ==
- Camo
