= Kamigamo Shrine =

Shrine in Kyoto, Japan

Kamigamo Shrine 上賀茂神社
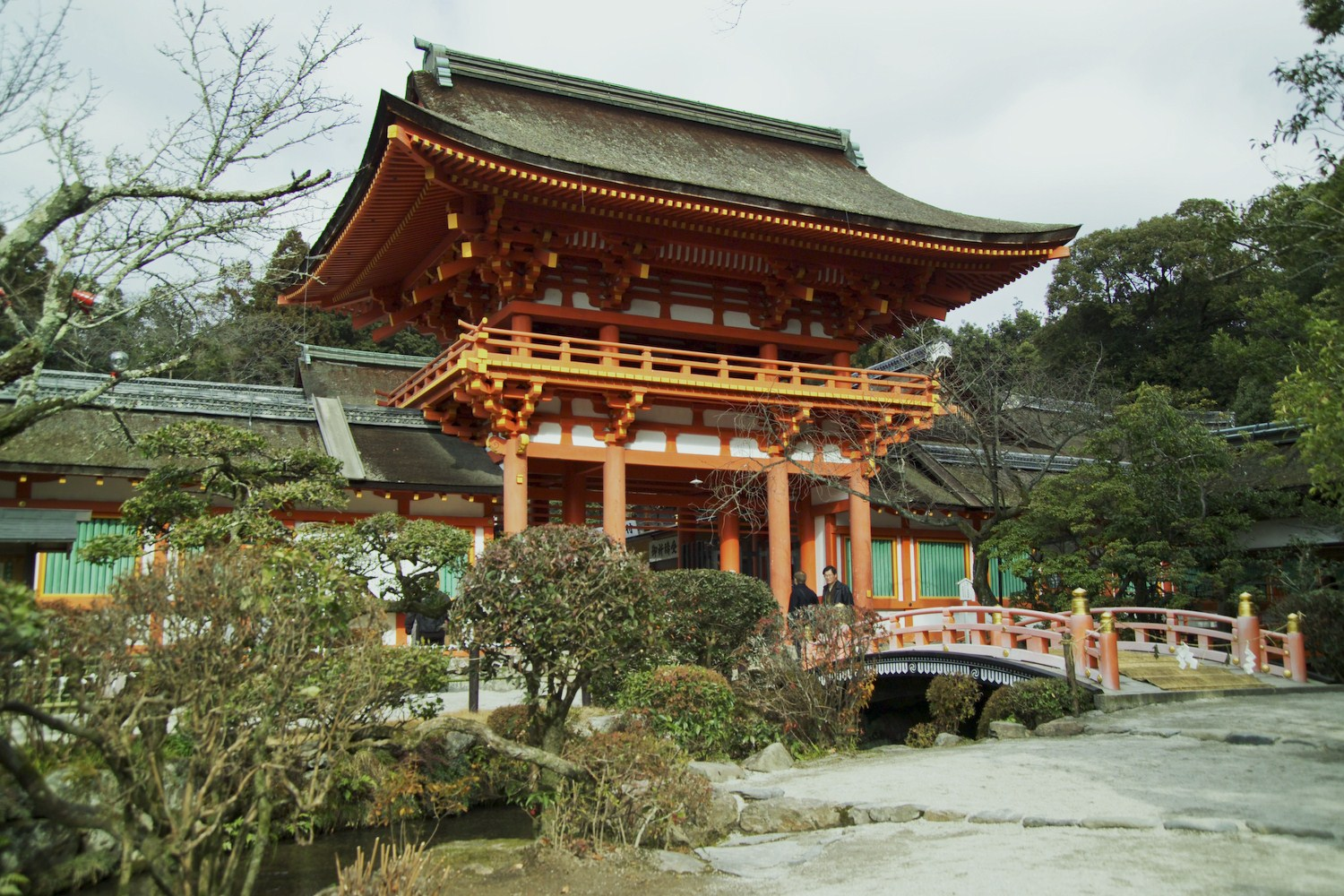

- Location within Japan

Religion
- Affiliation: Shinto
- Deity: Kamowakeikazuchinomikoto
- Festivals: Aoi Matsuri (Kamo no Matsuri; May 15th)
- Type: Shikinaisha; Twenty-Two Shrines; Yamashiro no Kuni ichinomiya Former kanpeitaisha Chokusaisha; Beppyo jinja

Location
- Location: 339 Kamigamomotoyama, Kita-ku, Kyoto, Kyoto Prefecture
- Coordinates: 35°03′37″N 135°45′10″E

Architecture
- Style: Sangensya-Nagare-zukuri
- Established: 678

Website
- www.kamigamojinja.jp/en/

Kamigamo Shrine (上賀茂神社, Kamigamo Jinja) is an important Shinto sanctuary on the banks of the Kamo River in north Kyoto, first founded in 678. Its formal name is the Kamo-wakeikazuchi Shrine (賀茂別雷神社, Kamo-wakeikazuchi jinja).

It is one of the oldest Shinto shrines in Japan and one of the seventeen Historic Monuments of Ancient Kyoto which have been designated by UNESCO as a World Heritage Site. The term Kamo-jinja in Japanese is a general reference to Shimogamo Shrine and Kamigamo Shrine, the traditionally linked Kamo shrines of Kyoto. The Kamo-jinja serve the function of protecting Kyoto from malign influences.

The jinja name identifies the Kamo family of kami or deities who are venerated. The name also refers to the ambit of shrine's nearby woods, which are vestiges of the primeval forest of Tadasu no Mori. In addition, the shrine name references the area's early inhabitants, the Kamo clan, many of whom continue to live near the shrine their ancestors traditionally served.

Kamogamo Shrine is dedicated to the veneration of Kamo Wake-ikazuchi, the kami of thunder.

== History ==
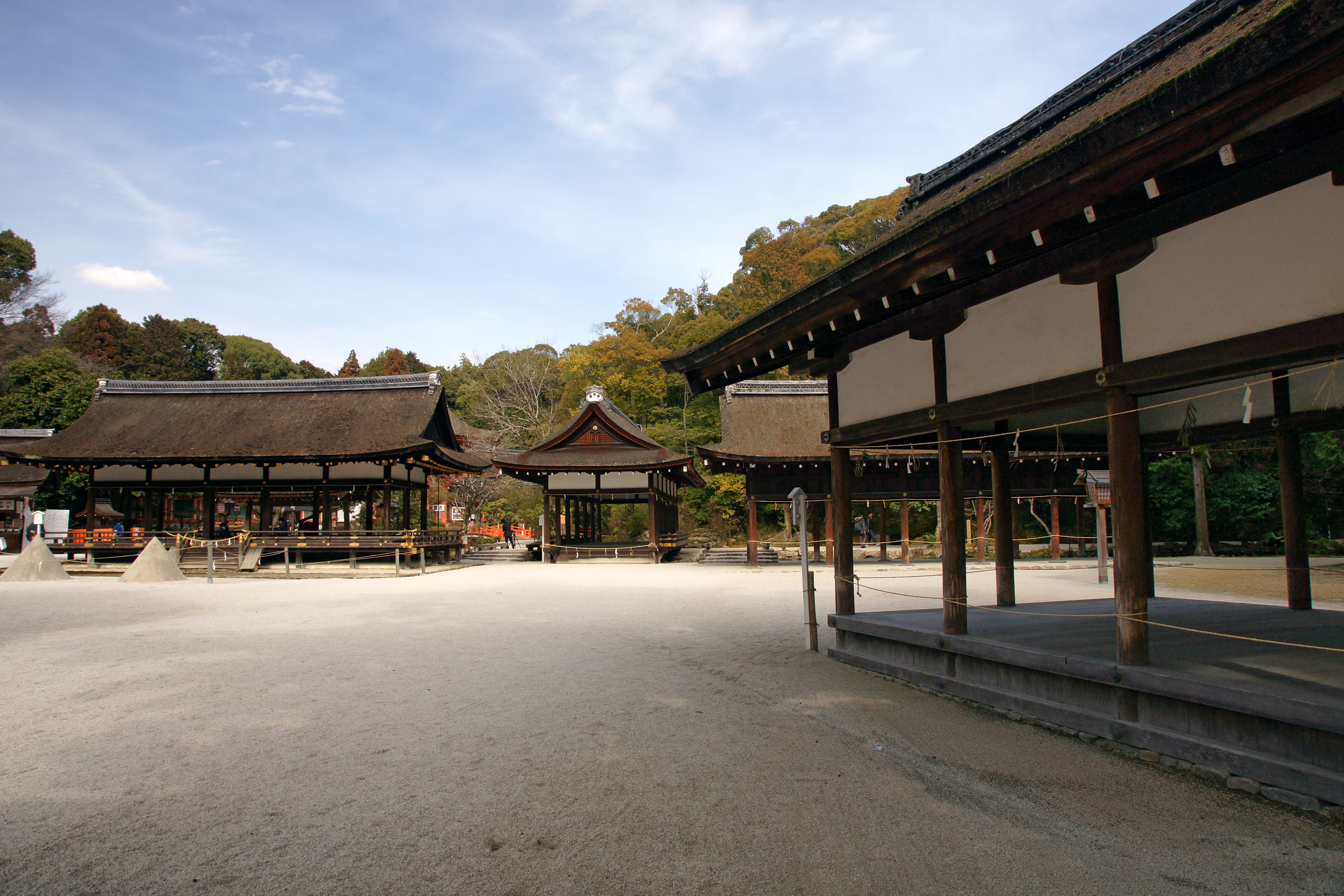
A serene expanse at the shrine

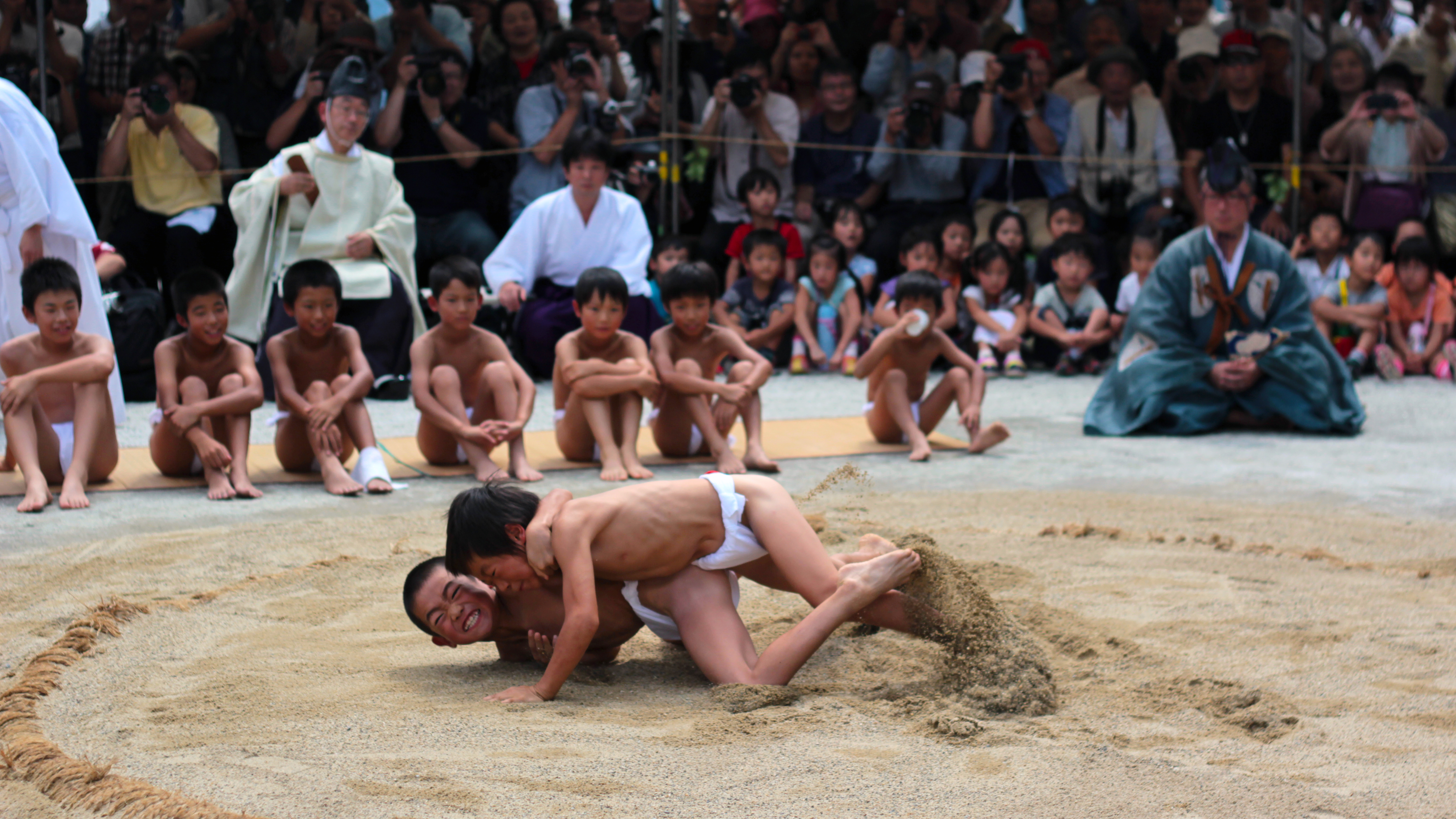
Karasu-zumo - lit. "crow sumo", a part of the festivities held each year at the shrine during Choyo.

The shrine became the object of Imperial patronage during the early Heian period.

Records from the reign of Emperor Heizei (806–809) mention that Kamo-mioya jinja was amongst a select number of establishments which had been granted a divine seal for use on documents. The seal would have been enshrined in its own unique mikoshi (Oshite jinja). This granting of a special seal and the practices associated with its use and preservation conformed to a pattern established by Emperor Kōnin (770–781) in 778 (Hōki 9).

In 965, Emperor Murakami ordered that Imperial messengers were sent to report important events to Japan's guardian kami, including Kamo Wake-ikazuchi.

Kamigamo, along with the Shimogamo Shrine, was designated as one of two chief Shinto shrines (ichinomiya) for the former Yamashiro Province.

From 1871 through 1946, Kamigamo was officially designated one of the Kanpei-taisha (官幣大社), meaning that it stood in the first rank of government supported shrines.

=== Imperial visits ===
- 794 (Enryaku 13): Emperor Kanmu came as part of a grand progress.
- 942 (Tengyō 5, 29th day of the 4th month): Emperor Suzaku visited to offer thanks for restoration of peace.
- 979 (Tengen 2, 10th day of the 10th month): Emperor En'yū decided that an Imperial visit Hachiman at Iwashimizu Shrine should be paired with a visit to Kamo.
- 1711 (Hōei 8): Emperor Nakamikado took refuge in the Hosodono when the palace had become uninhabitable.

== Structures ==
The jinja is famous for its haiden (worship hall), rebuilt in 1628–1629 (Kan'ei 6).

A number of priests' residences are situated on its grounds, and one, the Nishimura House, is open to the public.

=== Gallery ===
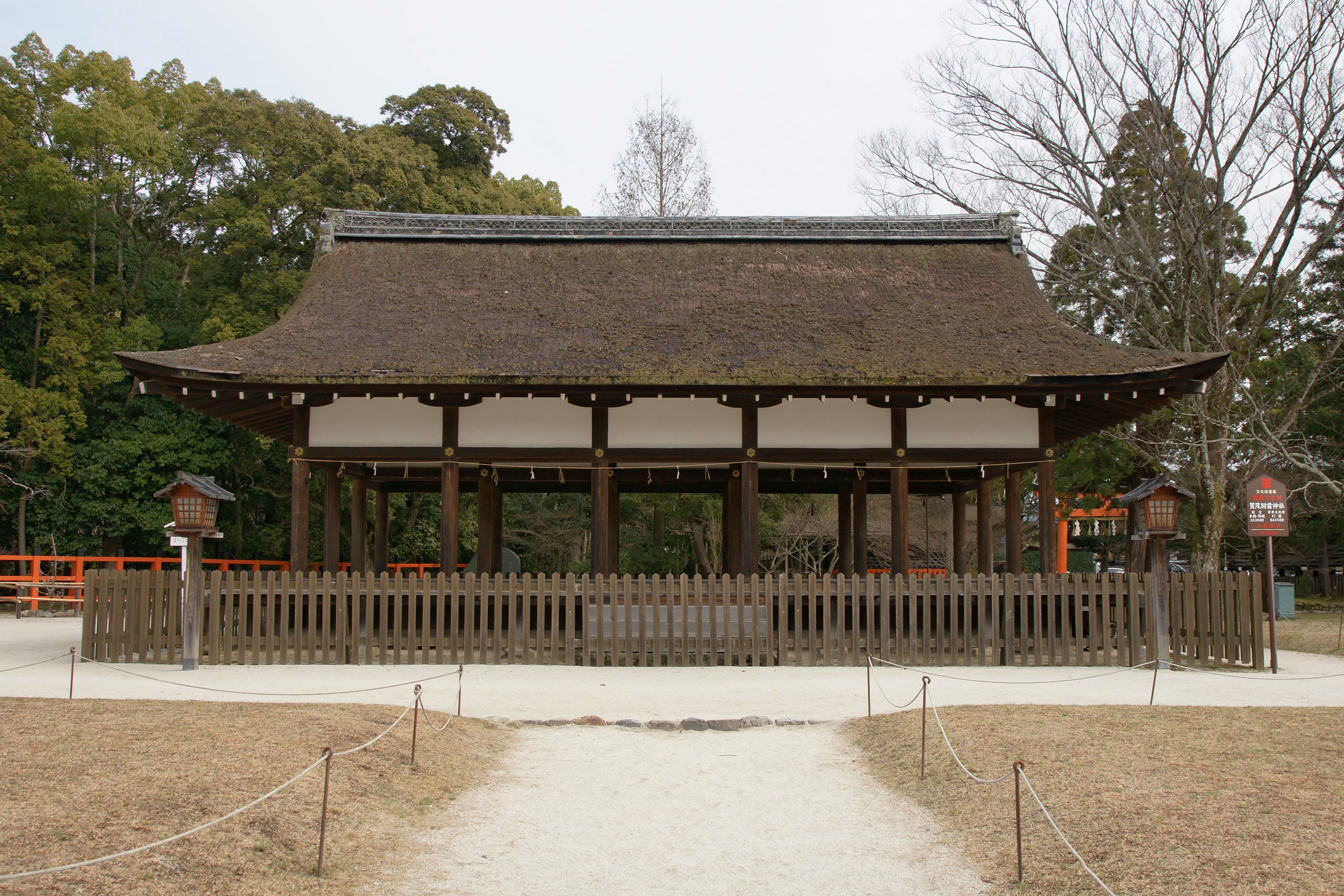
Geheiden

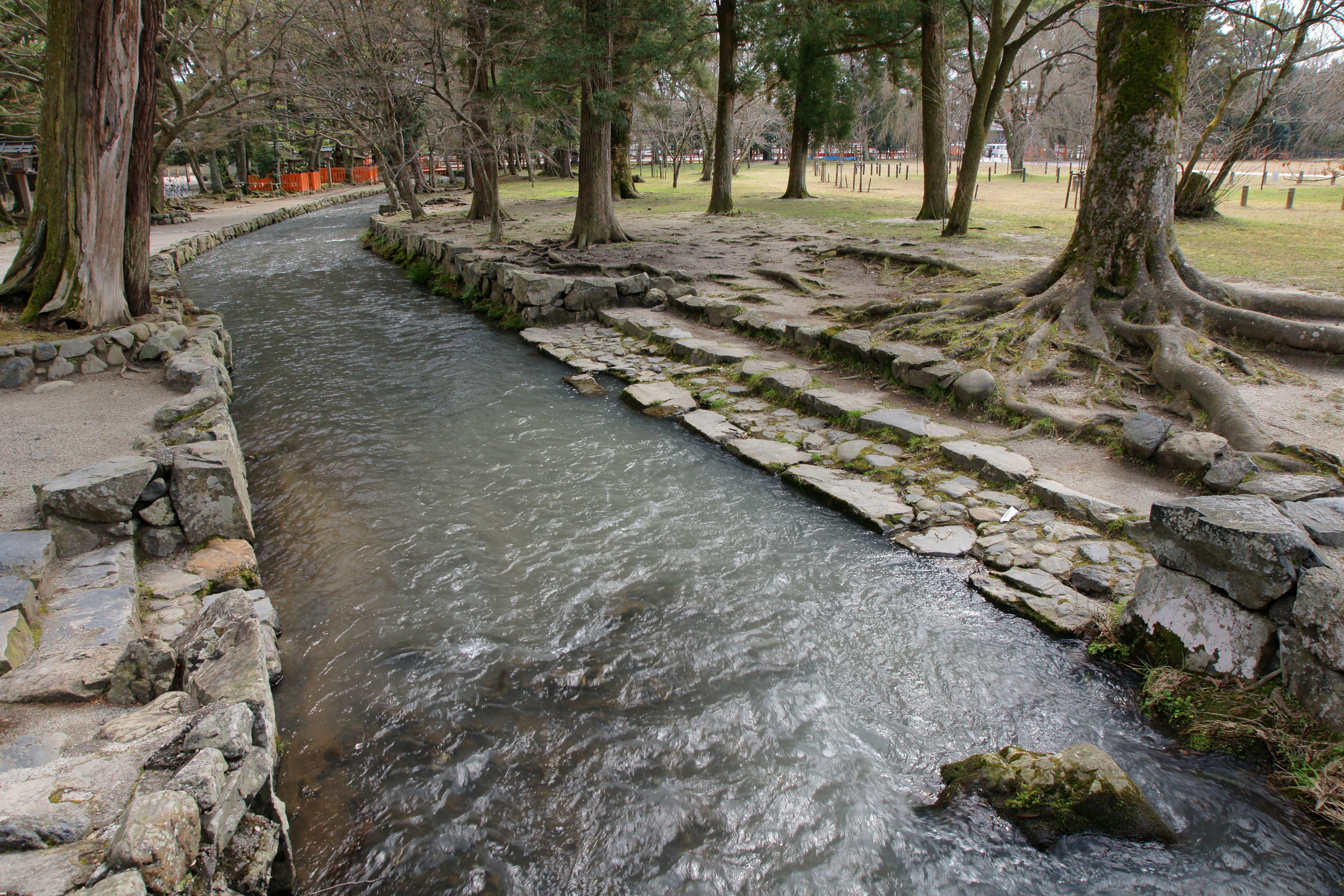
Nara-no-ogawa

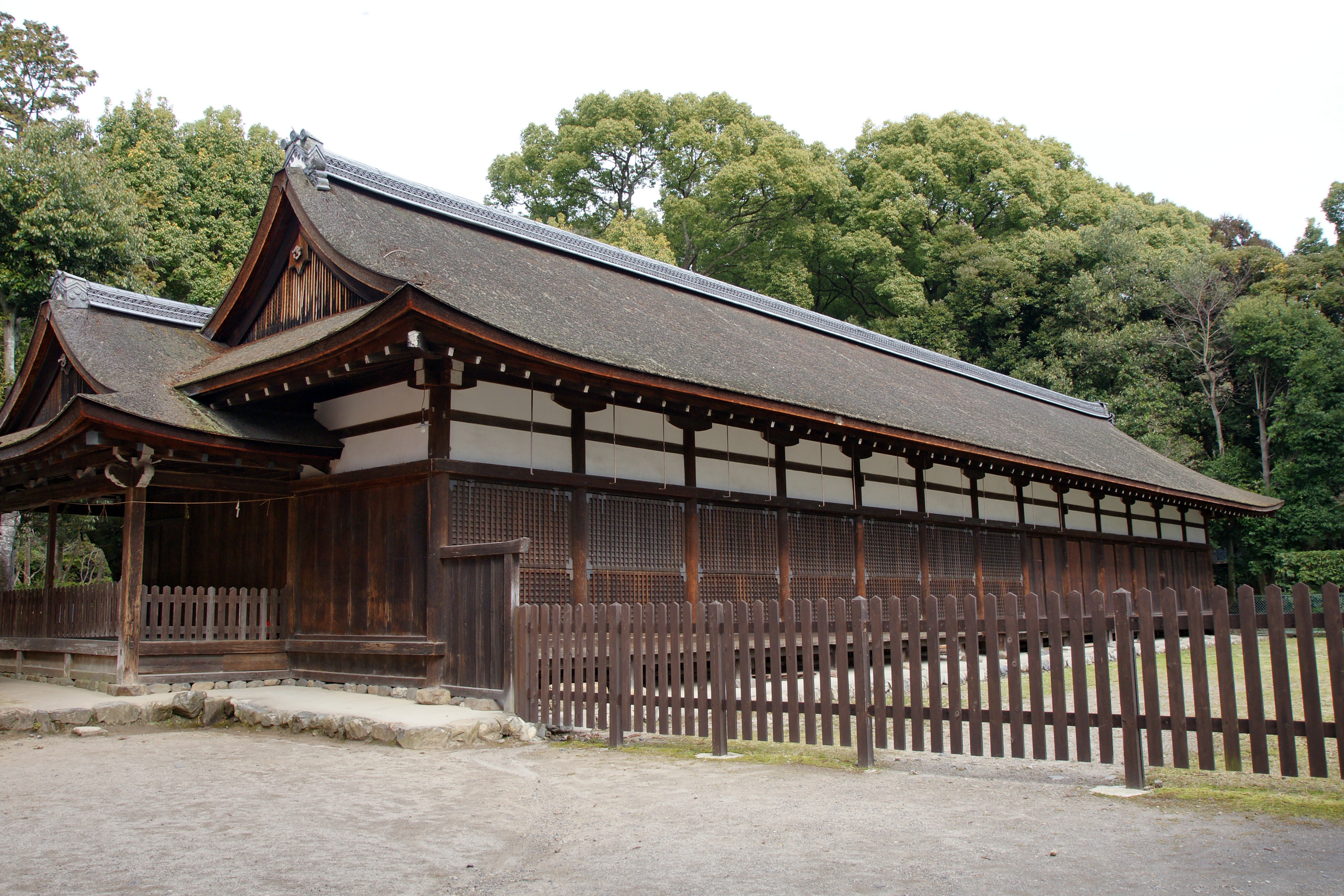
Kita-shinsenjo

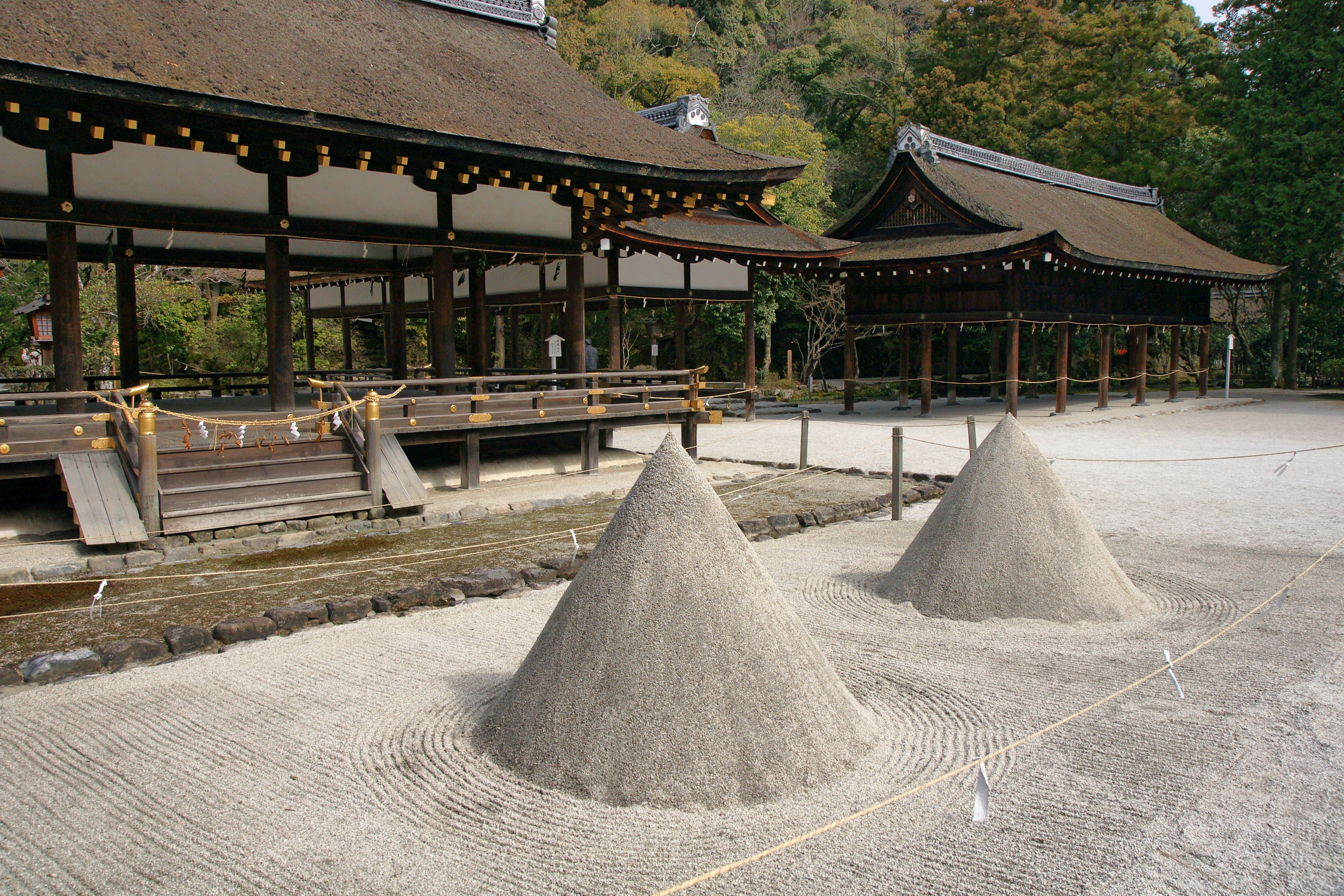
Tatesuna & Saiden

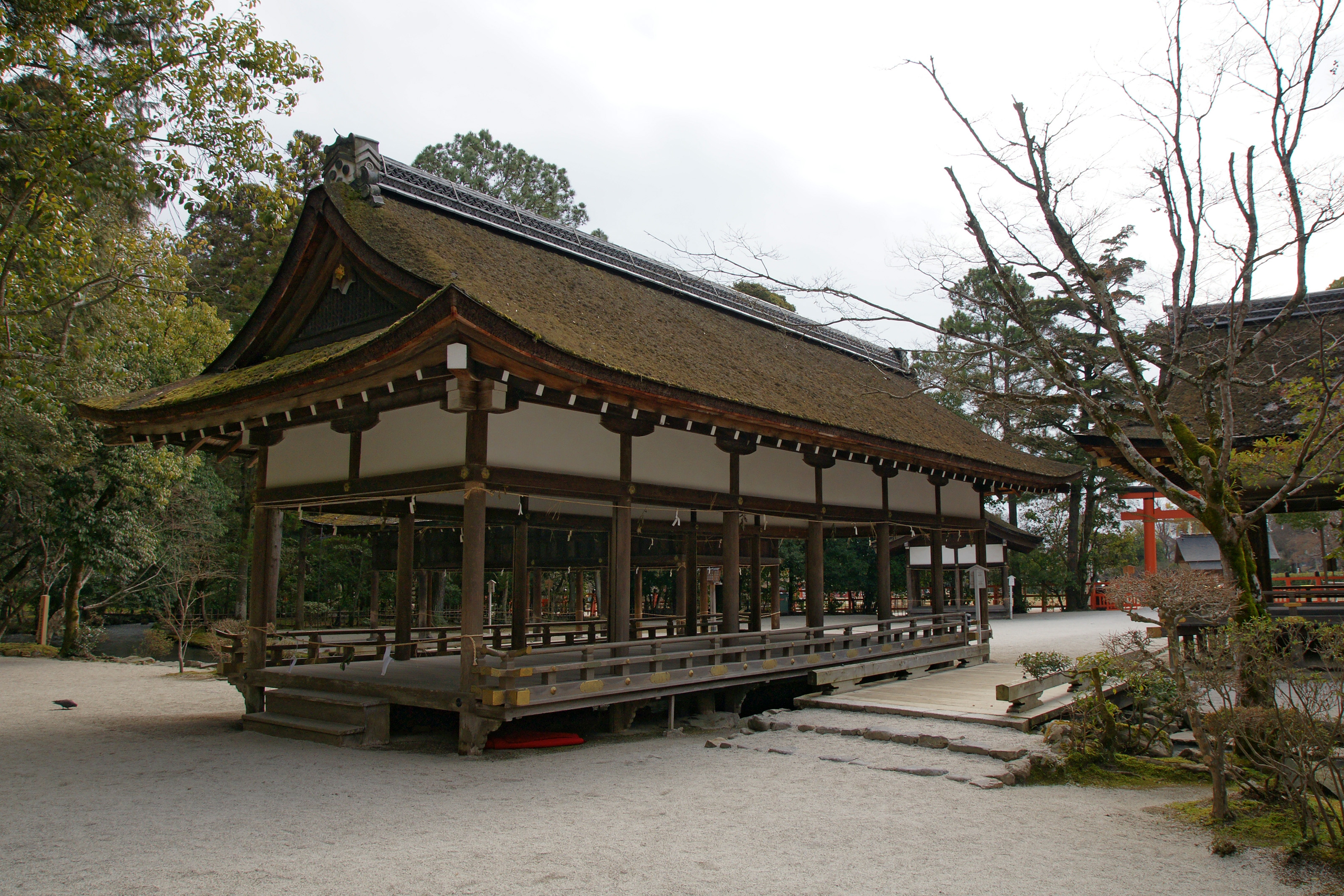
Hashiden

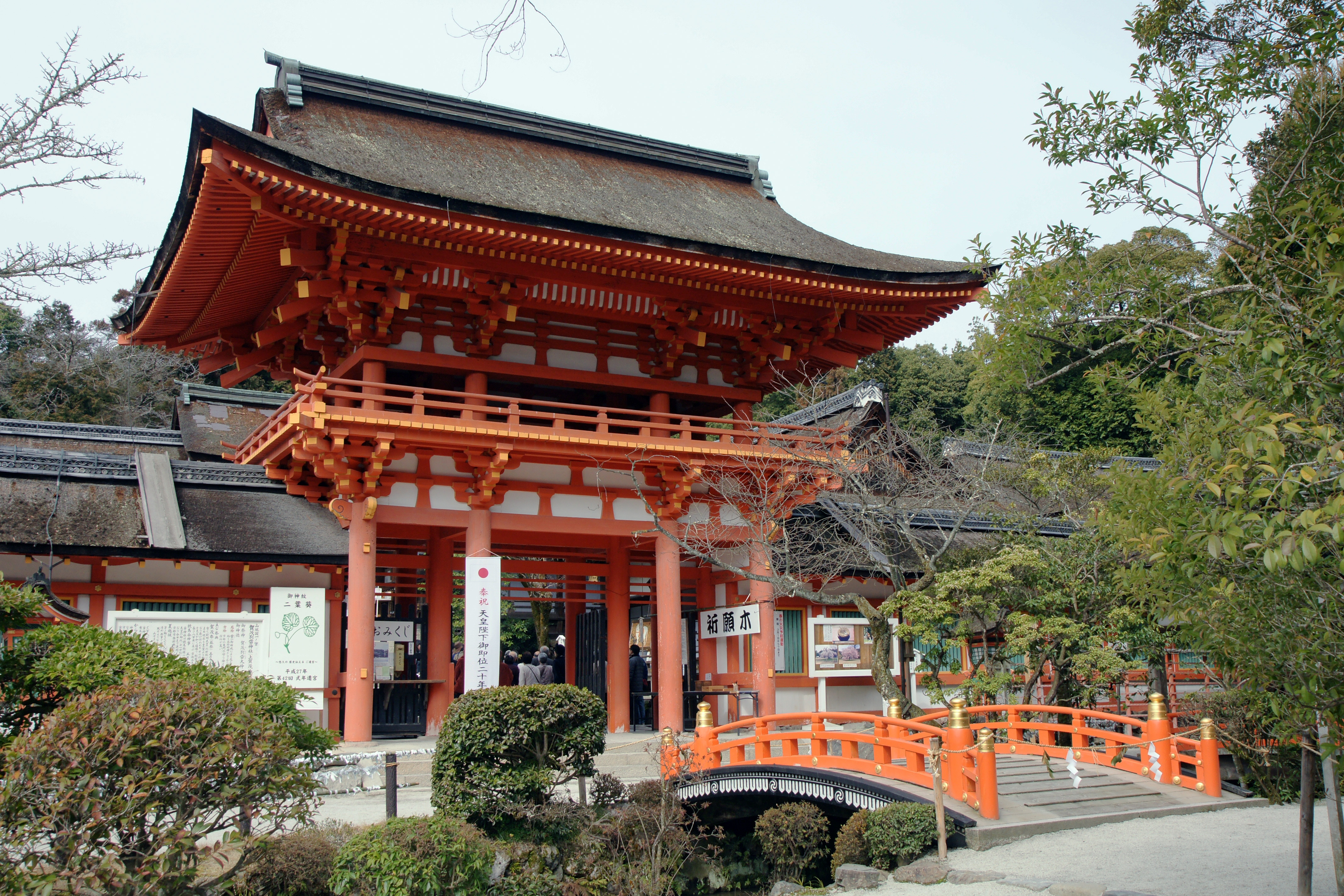
Rōmon

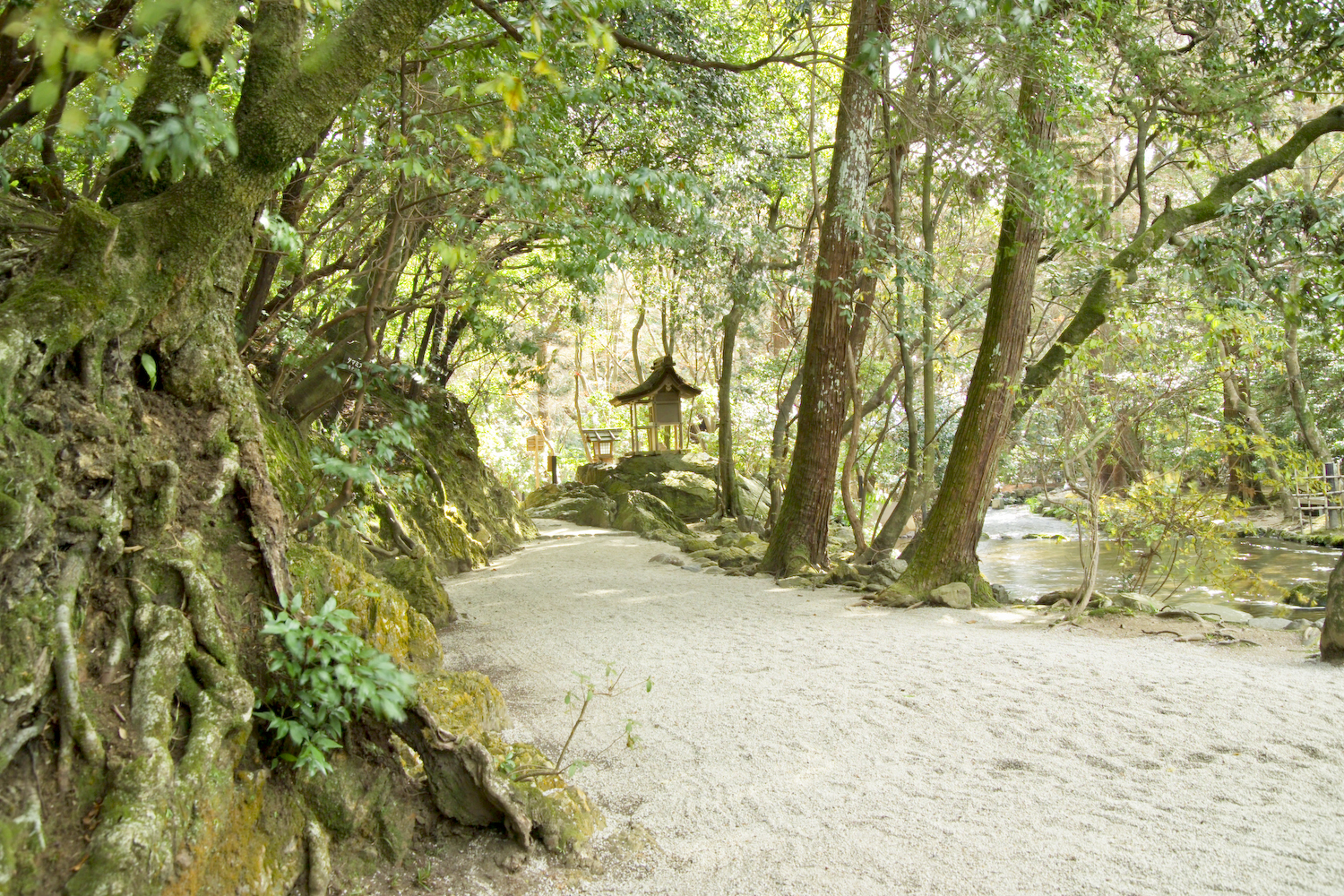
Vestige of primeval forest

== See also ==
- List of Shinto shrines
- Modern system of ranked Shinto Shrines
- Twenty-Two Shrines
- Yurihonjo hinakaido, an annual traditional doll display festival held in part of the shrine
