= Kamo shrines =

Shinto sanctuary complex in Kyoto, Japan

Kamo Shrine (賀茂神社, Kamo-jinja)
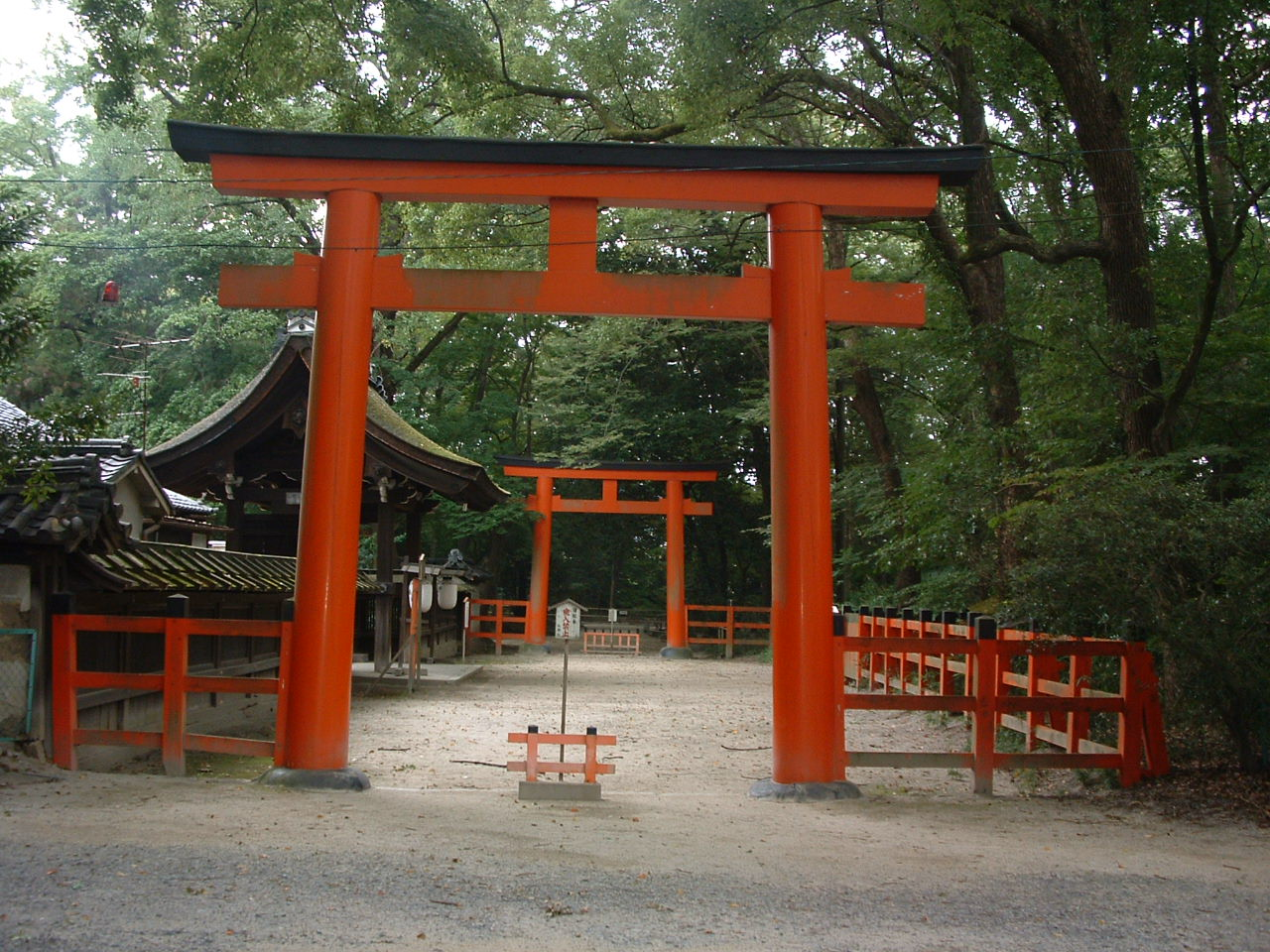
- A pair of torii gates at Shimogamo Shrine.

- Location within Japan

Religion
- Affiliation: Shinto

Location
- Coordinates: 35°03′37″N 135°45′10″E

Kamo Shrine (賀茂神社, Kamo-jinja) is a general term for an important Shinto sanctuary complex on both banks of the Kamo River in northeast Kyoto. It is centered on two shrines. The two shrines, an upper and a lower, lie in a corner of the old capital which was known as the "devil's gate" (鬼門, kimon) due to traditional geomancy beliefs that the north-east corner brought misfortune. Because the Kamo River runs from the north-east direction into the city, the two shrines along the river were intended to prevent demons from entering the city.

The Kamo Shrine encompasses what are now independent but traditionally associated jinja or shrines: the Kamo-wakeikazuchi Shrine (賀茂別雷神社, Kamo-wakeikazuchi jinja) in Kyoto's Kita Ward, and the "Kamo-mioya Shrine'" (賀茂御祖神社, Kamo-mioya jinja) in Sakyo Ward. They are amongst the "Historic Monuments of Ancient Kyoto" which have been designated by UNESCO as a World Heritage Site.

The jinja name identifies the clustered kami or deities who are venerated at the Kamo Shrine; and the name refers to the ambit of shrine's encircling woods. The shrine name also references the area's early inhabitants, the Kamo clan, many of whom continue to live near the shrine their ancestors traditionally served. The Kamo are credited with establishing this Shinto sacred place.

The formal names of corollary jinja memorialize vital roots in a history which pre-dates the founding of Japan's ancient capital. Although now incorporated within boundaries of the city, the Tadasu no Mori location was a site planning factor. It is theorized that this forest was the primeval forest home of the sacerdotal Kamo clan, who were the exclusive caretakers of the shrine from prehistoric times. The boundaries of today's smaller forest encompasses approximately 12.4 hectares, which are preserved as a national historical site (を国の史跡). The woods of this sacred grove are designated by UNESCO as a World Cultural Heritage site along with other Shinto shrines in its environs.

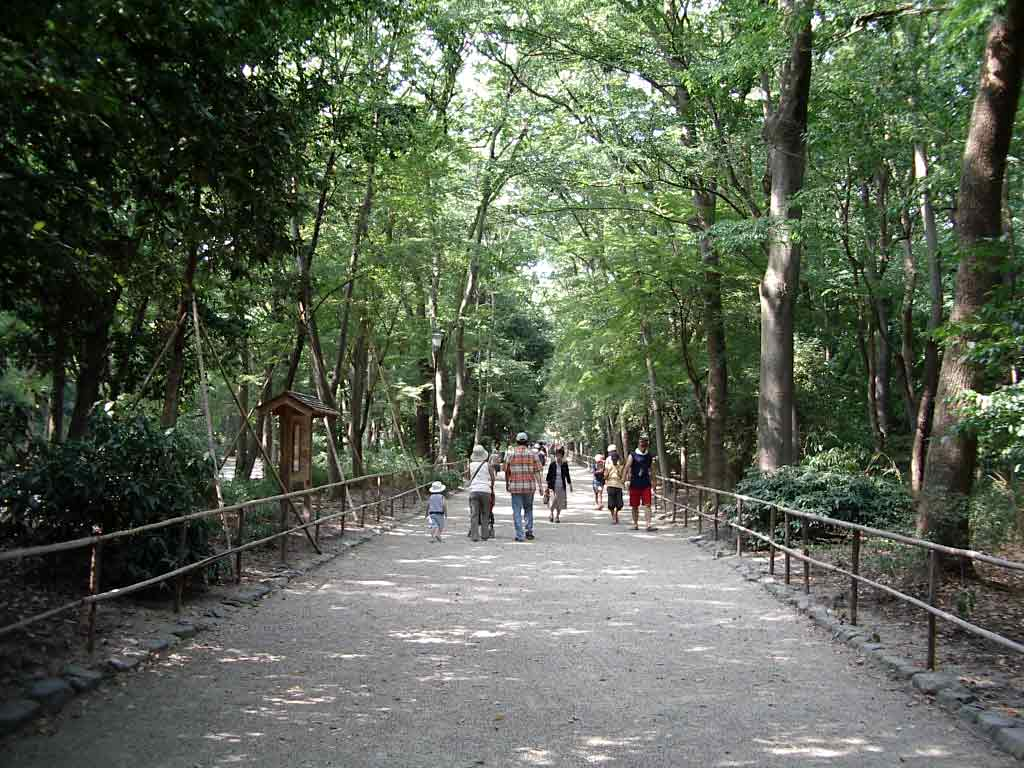
This pathway leads through Tadasu no Mori (the "Forest Where Lies are Revealed").

The shrine's annual festival, Kamo no Matsuri, also called Aoi Matsuri, is the oldest of Kyoto's three major festivals. The others are Jidai Matsuri and Gion Matsuri.

== Shinto belief ==
The popular name for Kamo-wakeikazuchi jinja is the Kamigamo jinja or Kamigamo Shrine, also called Upper Shrine. In part, it is called the "upper" shrine because it is situated on the east bank of the Kamo River (鴨川 or 賀茂川, Kamo-gawa) up-stream from its non-identical twin.

The more commonly used name for Kamo-mioya jinja is the Shimogamo jinja or Shimogamo Shrine, also called the Lower Shrine. In part, it is called the "lower" shrine because it is situated at the confluence of the Takano River (高野川, Takano-gawa) and the Kamo River down-stream from its twin.

The Kamo Shrine is so named because its rituals and festivals are designed to assist in the veneration of the Kamo family of kami and other associated deities; and Kamo kami (kami-no-Kamo) is referenced in other Shinto contexts. In the "Congratulatory Words of the Chieftain of Izumo," the "sacred grove of Kamo" is mentioned along with other wooded Shinto sanctuaries at Ō-miwa, Unade and Asuka:

Then, Ō-namochi-no-mikoto said:
"The Sovereign Grandchild will dwell peacefully in the land of Yamato."
Thus saying, he attached his peaceful spirit
To a mirror of large dimensions,
Eulogizing it by the name
Yamato-no-Ō-mono-nushi-Kushi-mika-tama-no-mikoto,
And had it dwell in the sacred grove of Ō-miwa.
He caused the spirit of his son
Aji-suki-taka-hiko-ne-no-mikoto
To dwell in the sacred grove of Kamo in Kaduraki;
Caused the spirit of Koto-shiro-nushi-no-mikoto
To dwell in Unade;
And caused the spirit of Kayanarumi-no-mikoto
To dwell in the sacred grove of Asuka.

At the Kamigamo Shrine, Kamo Wake-ikazuchi, the kami of thunder, is the focus of attention and reverence.

Shimogamo Shrine is dedicated to the veneration of Kamo Wake-ikazuchi's mother, Kamo Tamayori-hime. Shimogamo is also dedicated to Kamo Taketsune, who is the father of Kamo Taayori-hime.

All feature prominently in the annual Aoi Festival, which occurs in May. Featured in this event are a procession between the two shrines, horse races, and demonstrations of mounted archery (yabusame).

Kamigamo Shrine's two large conical sand mounds memorialize the holy trees that once served to welcome spirits.

Shimogama Shrine has since become one of the key shrines in the area, being associated with prayers to ensure the success of the annual rice harvest. The Shrine is located within Tadasu no Mori (糺の森), 'the forest of truth,' a primeval forest that is reputed to have never been burned down. The forest has, in fact, suffered some damage over the centuries when all of Kyoto was burned during successive revolts and wars; but the forest growth has rebounded again and again. Tadasu no mori is left to grow in its natural state. It is neither planted nor pruned.

Although Kamigamo and Shimogamo shrines are considered to be paired or twinned, they are not located next to each other. Approximately 2 km. distance separates these two Shinto shrine complexes, which can be explained in part because shrines on the outskirts of Heian-kyō were developed to prevent the infiltration of demons. The Kamogawa river descends from an ill-omened direction; and the shrines along the flow were positioned in order to prevent demons from using the river to enter the city. Although Kamo-jinja is not directly on the banks of the Kamo River, the site locations were positioned as part of a plan for mitigating the consequences of periodic flooding.

== History ==
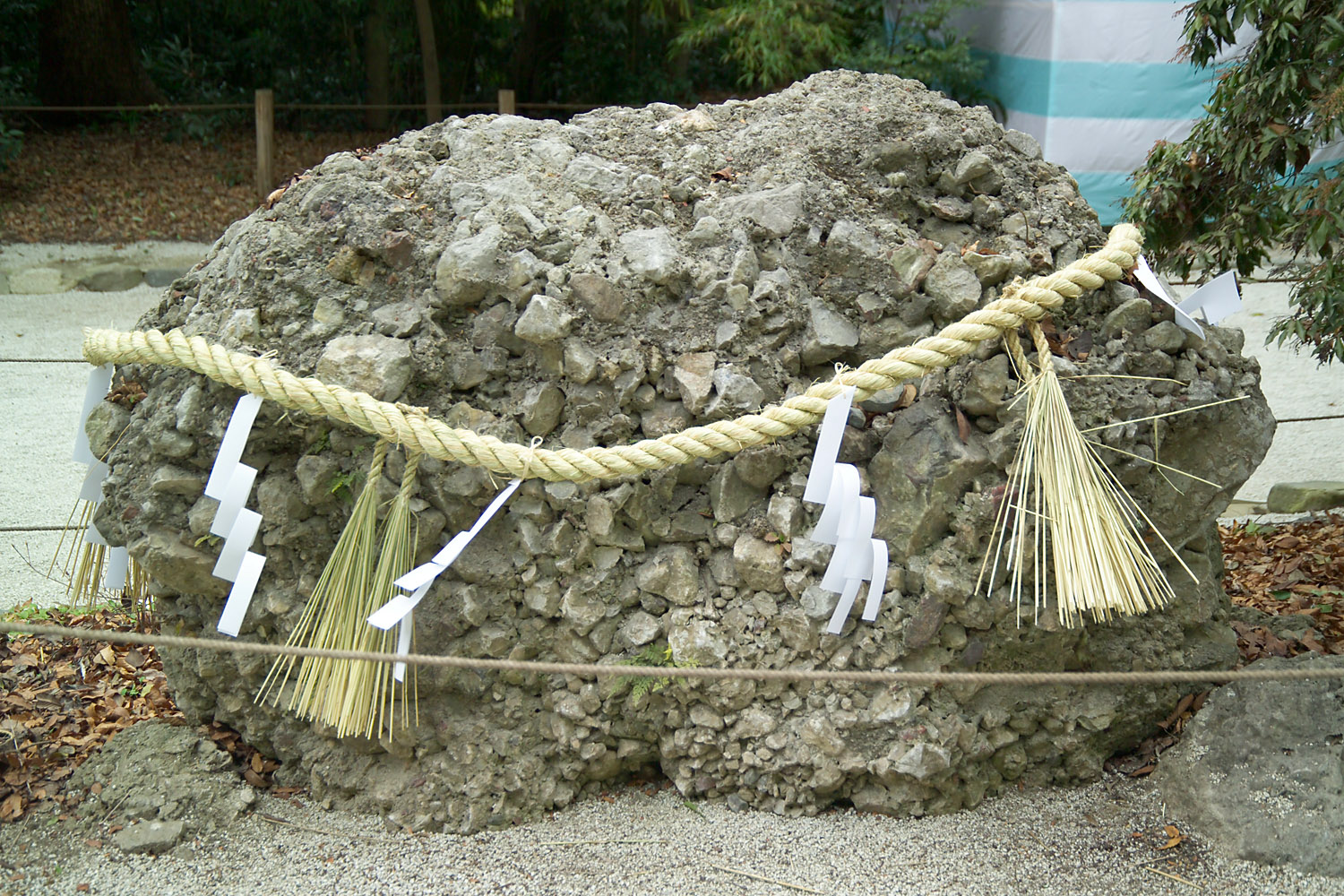
Sazare-Ishi (conglomerate rock) alludes to pebbles which are said to grow into boulders as described in the lyrics of Kimi ga Yo.

The shrines became the object of Imperial patronage during the early Heian period. In 965, Emperor Murakami ordered that Imperial messengers were sent to report important events to Japan's guardian kami, including those venerated at the Kamo Shrine. These heihaku were initially presented to 16 shrines.

The lower shrine is that of a kami mother; and the upper shrine is that of her kami offspring (mikogami). The head priests of both have the same title, Kamo-no-Agata-no Nushi. In agata-no-nushi titles, the appended noun is typically a place name; but in a Taihō ritsuryō consolidation, the Kamo mirror the Yamato clan's amalgamating conventions in merging the area, its name, its sacred centers and its kami within a single nominative identifier.

=== Kamigamo Shrine ===
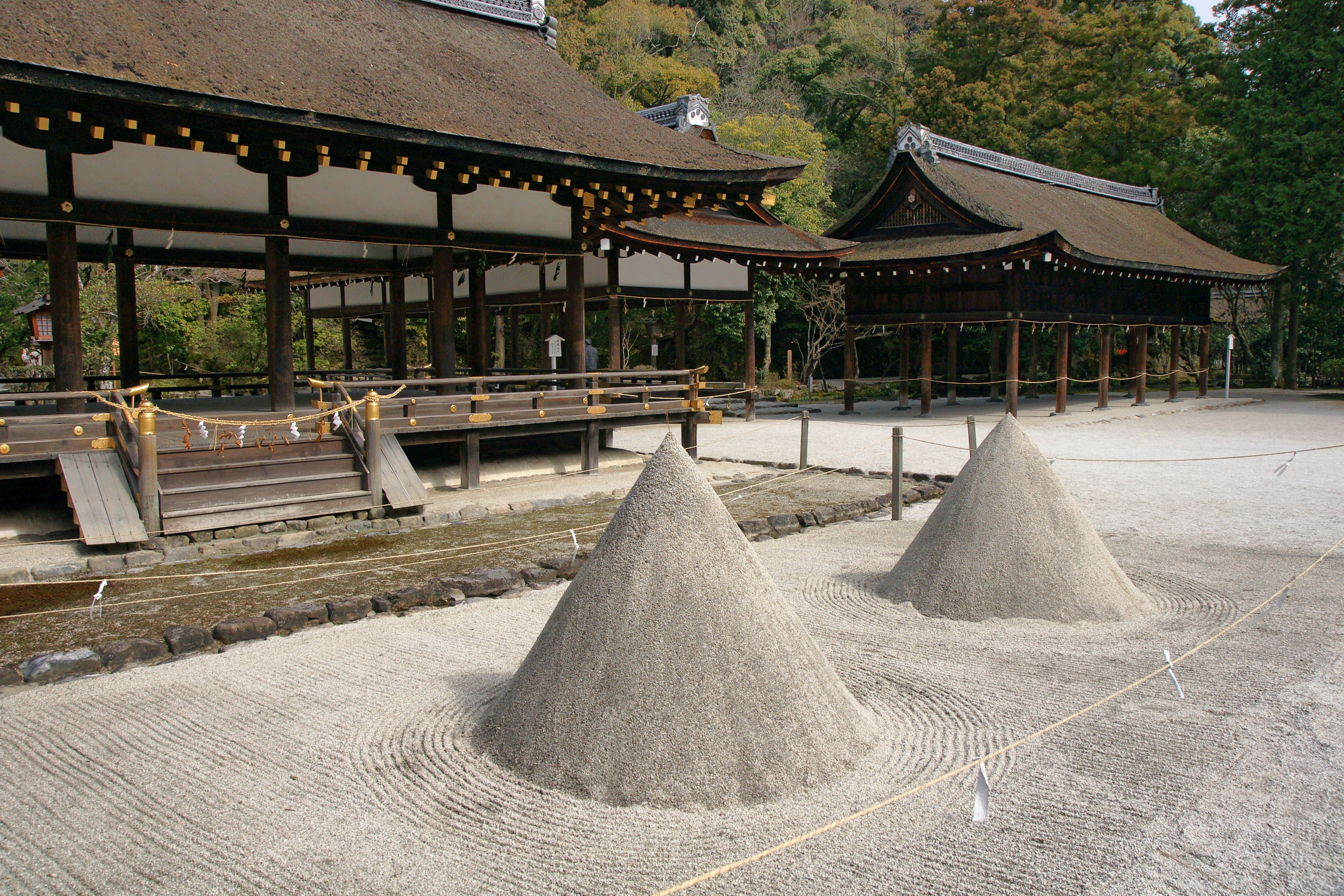
Tatesuna are a pair of standing cones of sand in front of Sai-Den at Kamigamo-jinja. They are traditionally construed as allusions to a pair of sacred mountains.

From 1871 through 1946, the Kamigamo Shrine was officially designated one of the Kanpei-taisha (官幣大社), meaning that it stood in the first rank of government supported shrines.

It is famous for its haiden (worship hall), rebuilt in 1628-1629 (Kan'ei 6). A number of priests' residences are situated on its grounds, and one, the Nishimura House, is open to the public.

=== Shimogamo Shrine ===
The Shimogamo Shrine was officially designated Kanpei-taisha in 1871.

Shimogamo Shrine is believed to be 100 years older than Kamigamo Shrine, dating back to the 6th century.

A shrine structure was erected in 678 during the reign of the Emperor Tenmu, and this became the principal building during the reign or of the Emperor Kanmu when he transferred the capital from Heijō-kyō, and Nagaoka-kyō to Heian-kyō.

=== Imperial progresses to the shrines ===
- January 16, 795 (Enryaku 13, 21st day of the 12th month): Emperor Kanmu made an Imperial progress to both Kamo shrines.
- October 25, 1334 (Kenmu 1, 27th day of the 9th month): Emperor Go-Daigo made an Imperial progress to Kamo-jinja.
- April 29, 1863 (Bunkyū 3, on the 11th day of the 3rd month): Emperor Kōmei made an Imperial progress to the Kamo Shrines. He was accompanied by the shōgun, all the principal officials and many feudal lords. This was the first Imperial progress since Emperor Go-Mizunoo visited Nijō Castle more than 230 years before; and no Emperor had visited Kamo since Emperor Go-Daigo honored both shrines in Kenmu 1 (1334).

== List of Kamo shrines ==
- Shimogamo Shrine
- Kamigamo Shrine
- Kanamura Wake Ikazuchi Shrine

== See also ==
- List of Shinto shrines
- Twenty-Two Shrines
- Modern system of ranked Shinto Shrines
- Saiin
