= Shimogamo Shrine =

Shinto shrine in Japan

Shimogamo Shrine 下鴨神社
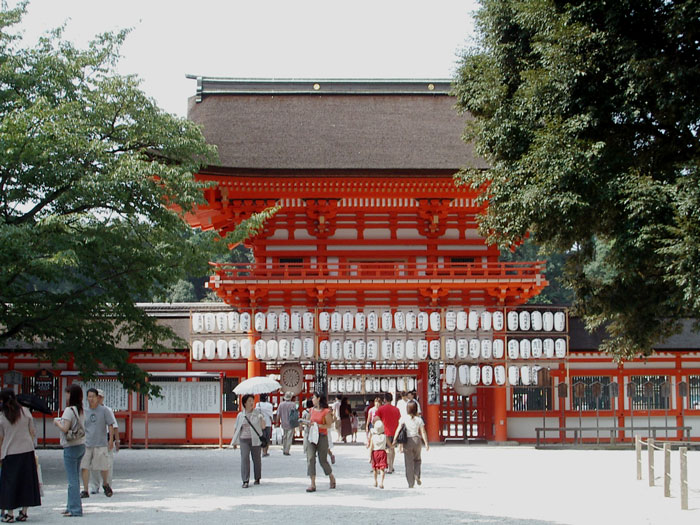
- Shimogamo Shrine

- Location within Japan

Religion
- Affiliation: Shinto
- Deity: Tamakushi-hime (玉依姫命); Kamotaketsunumi no Mikoto (賀茂建角身命)
- Festivals: Aoi Matsuri (Kamo no Matsuri; May 15th)
- Type: Shikinaisya; Yamashiro no Kuni ichinomiya Twenty-Two Shrines; Former kanpeitaisha Chokusaisha; Beppyo jinja

Location
- Location: 59 Shimogamo Izumigawa-chō, Sakyō-ku, Kyoto, Kyoto Prefecture
- Coordinates: 35°02′20″N 135°46′21″E

Architecture
- Style: Nagare-zukuri
- Established: 6th century

Website
- www.shimogamo-jinja.or.jp/english/

Shimogamo Shrine (Japanese: 下鴨神社, Hepburn: Shimogamo-jinja) is an important Shinto sanctuary in the Shimogamo district of Kyoto city's Sakyō ward. Its formal name is Kamo-mioya Shrine (賀茂御祖神社, Kamo-mioya-jinja). It is one of the oldest Shinto shrines in Japan and is one of the seventeen Historic Monuments of Ancient Kyoto which have been designated by UNESCO as a World Heritage Site. The term Kamo-jinja in Japanese is a general reference to Shimogamo Shrine and Kamigamo Shrine, the traditionally linked Kamo shrines of Kyoto; Shimogamo is the older of the pair, being believed to be 100 years older than Kamigamo, and dating to the 6th century, centuries before Kyoto became the capital of Japan (794, see Heian-kyō). The Kamo-jinja serve the function of protecting Kyoto from malign influences.

The jinja name identifies the Kamo family of kami or deities who are venerated. The name also refers to the ambit of shrine's nearby woods, which are vestiges of the primeval forest of Tadasu no Mori. In addition, the shrine name references the area's early inhabitants, the Kamo clan, many of whom continue to live near the shrine their ancestors traditionally served.

Shimogamo Shrine is dedicated to the veneration of Tamayori-hime (玉依姫; lit. 'the spirit-inviting maiden') and her father, Kamo Taketsunomi (賀茂建角身). Tamayori-hime is the mother of Kamo Wakeikazuchi (賀茂別雷; the thunder-divider of Kamo), who was sired by Honoikazuchi-no-mikoto (火雷神; the God of Fire and Thunder). Kamigamo Shrine, the other of the two Kamo shrines of Kyoto, is dedicated to Kamo Wakeikazuchi. These kami are variously associated with thunder.

== History ==
The shrine became the object of Imperial patronage during the early Heian period. Shimogamo, along with the Kamigamo Shrine, was designated as one of two chief Shinto shrines (ichinomiya) for the former Yamashiro Province. In 965, Emperor Murakami ordered that Imperial messengers were sent to report important events to Japan's guardian kami, including Kamo-Tamayori-hime and Kamo-Taketsune. The writer of Hōjōki, Kamo no Chōmei (鴨長明), was the second son of one of the head priests of the shrine, Kamo no Nagatsugu (鴨長継). From 1871 through 1946, Shimogamo was officially designated one of the Kanpei-taisha (官幣大社), meaning that it stood in the first rank of government supported shrines. Today, it is one of the most visited sites during the new year, and the popular national pastime game of kemari is often played by Shinto priests.

=== Imperial visits ===
- 794 (Enryaku 13): Emperor Kanmu came as part of a grand progress.
- 942 (Tengyō 5, 29th day of the 4th month): Emperor Suzaku visited to offer thanks for restoration of peace.
- 979 (Tengen 2, 10th day of the 10th month): Emperor En'yū decided that an Imperial visit Hachiman at Iwashimizu Shrine should be paired with a visit to Kamo.
- 1088 (Kanji 27th day of the 4th month): Emperor Horikawa visited Kamo.
- 1156 (Hōgen 1, 23rd day of the 4th month): Emperor Go-Shirakawa traveled to Kamo.

== Architecture ==
The oldest records of the shrines existence dates it back to Emperor Sujin's reign, around 97 B.C., where it is known that part of the shrine underwent repairs. By around the 8th century, the shrine had fully taken up its modern form.

In accordance with a Shinto tradition known as Shikinen Sengu, the shrine has been re-built many times throughout different periods. It was rebuilt at approximately 21 year intervals consistently for nearly 300 years, from 1036 to 1322. Afterwards, due to certain practical constraints, repairs and reconstructions mostly ceased. The majority of the shrine was reconstructed in once again 1629, strongly restoring it to its Heian period form. Additional reconstruction and repairs took place on the two main shrine buildings (the Higashi Honden and the Nishi Honden) four times in the 17th and 18th centuries, and once finally in 1863. Today, following tradition, limited repairs and reconstructions take place at scheduled 21 year intervals.

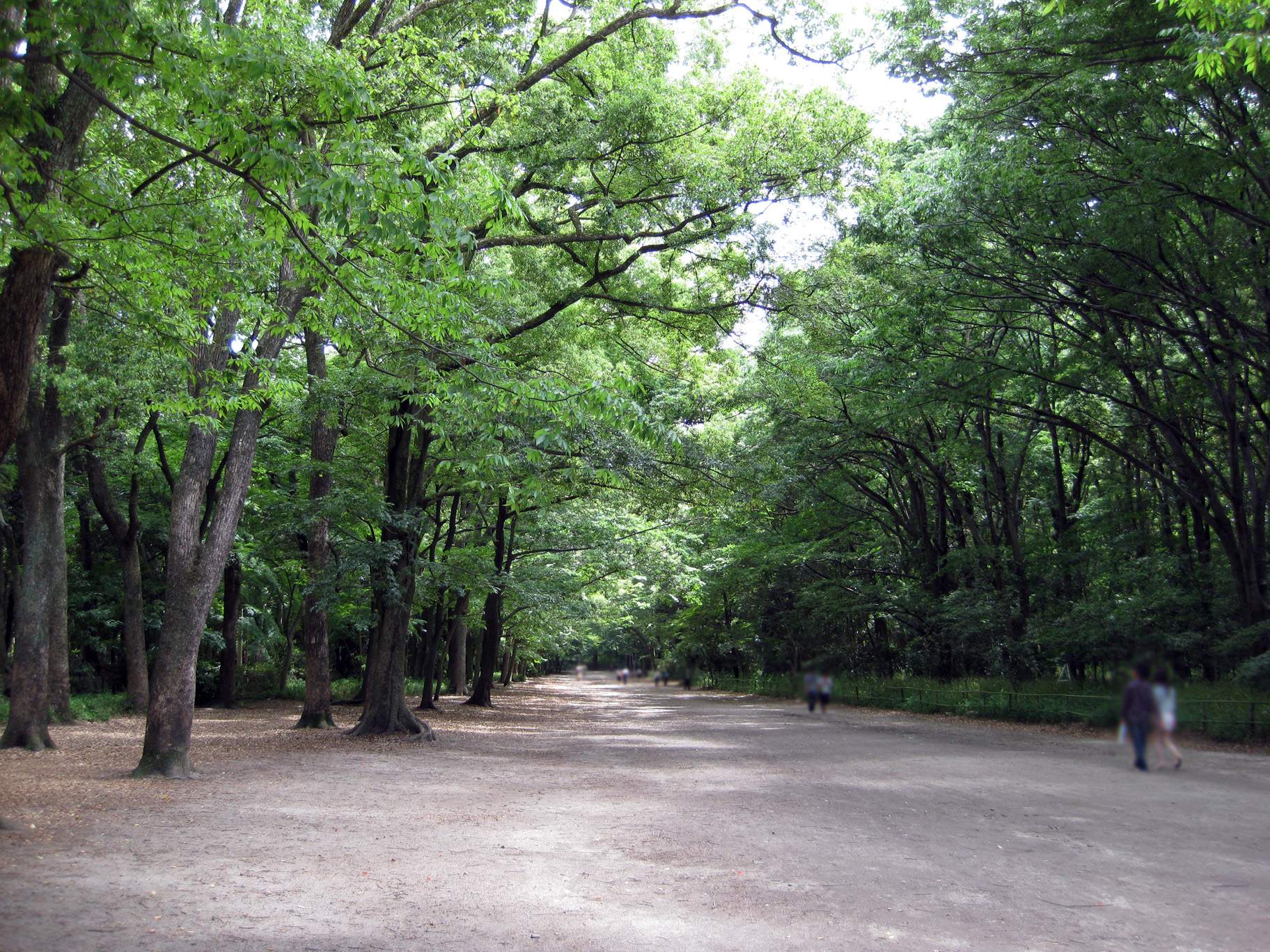
Tadasu no Mori Forest, as seen approaching the shrine.

The overall layout of the shrine is similar to the other Kamo shrine, the Kamigamo Shrine, with some unique properties of its own. There are a total of 57 structures on the site. Approaching the shrine, the experience is mostly the same as it once was in the past, thanks to the Tadasu no Mori forest. This forest is the oldest remaining in Kyoto, and mostly surrounds the shrine's total area of 30 acres. The approach through the forest, or the Sandō, passes through many Torii gates, and serves as an important procession path for events, festivals, and other religious ceremonies. Similar to the Kamigamo shrine, there are many bridges and other Kairō along the path. However, unlike the Kamigamo, the layout and majority of the shrine's buildings follow an axial plan defined by the Sandō, traditional of Shinto shrines.

Throughout the shrine, there are many different structures and worship areas that are dedicated to specific prayers and or specific shinto deities. A notable unique aspect of the Shimogamo Shrine are the seven Kotosha shrines. These structures are all contained in one courtyard next to one another, and likely date back to the Edo period. Each of the shrines are dedicated to either one or two gods of the Chinese zodiac. It is customary for visitors passing through to pray before the enshrined deity that corresponds to their birth year.

The two main shrines of the site are the East Main Hall and the West Main Hall. The East Main Hall or the Higashi Honden enshrines Kamo Taketsunumi no Mikoto, a god that is said to have been incarnated as a golden hawk that aided Emperor Jimmu. The West Main Hall or the Nishi Honden enshrines Tamayorihime no Mikoto, the only daughter of Taketsunumi no Mikoto. She is said to have given birth to the deity that is enshrined at the Kamigamo Shrine, Ajisukitakahikone. Public access to the shrine's Honden is traditionally restricted (typical of shinto shrines), usually only being open for certain festivals or to shinto priests for religious ceremonies.

=== Gallery ===
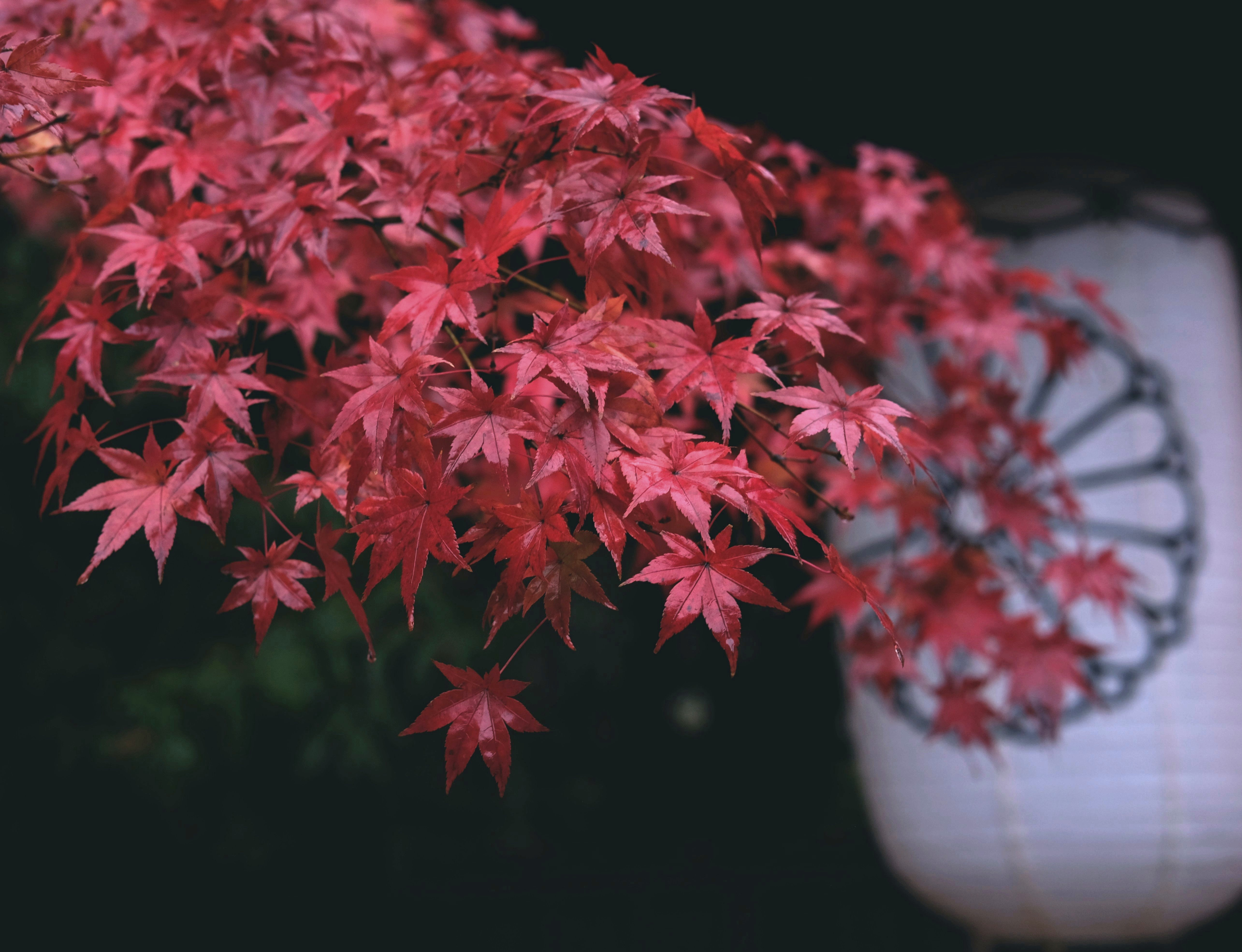
Maple leaves and paper lantern at the shrine

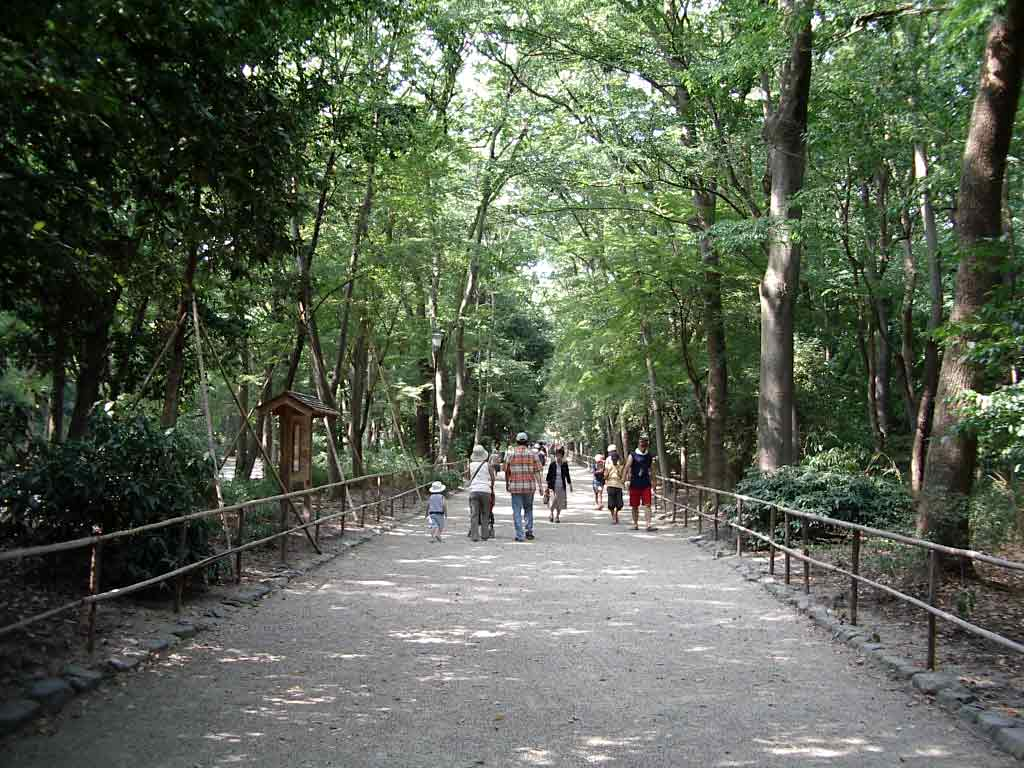
This pathway leads through Tadasu no Mori (the "Forest Where Lies are Revealed").

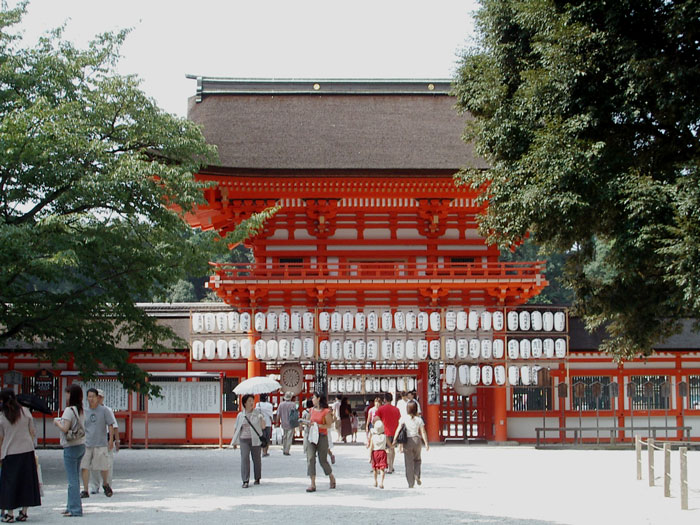
Rōmon

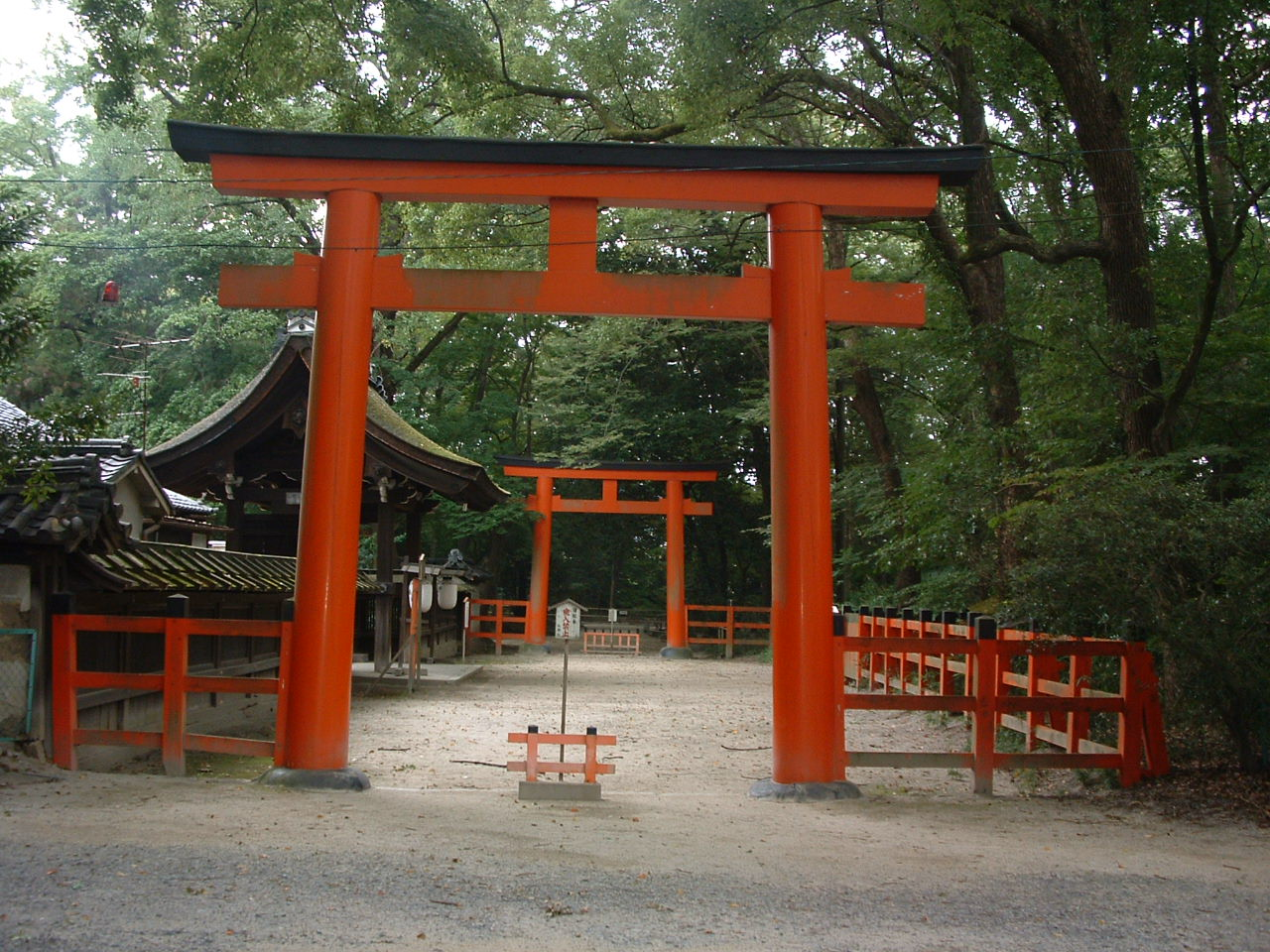
A pair of torii gates, Kawai-jinja

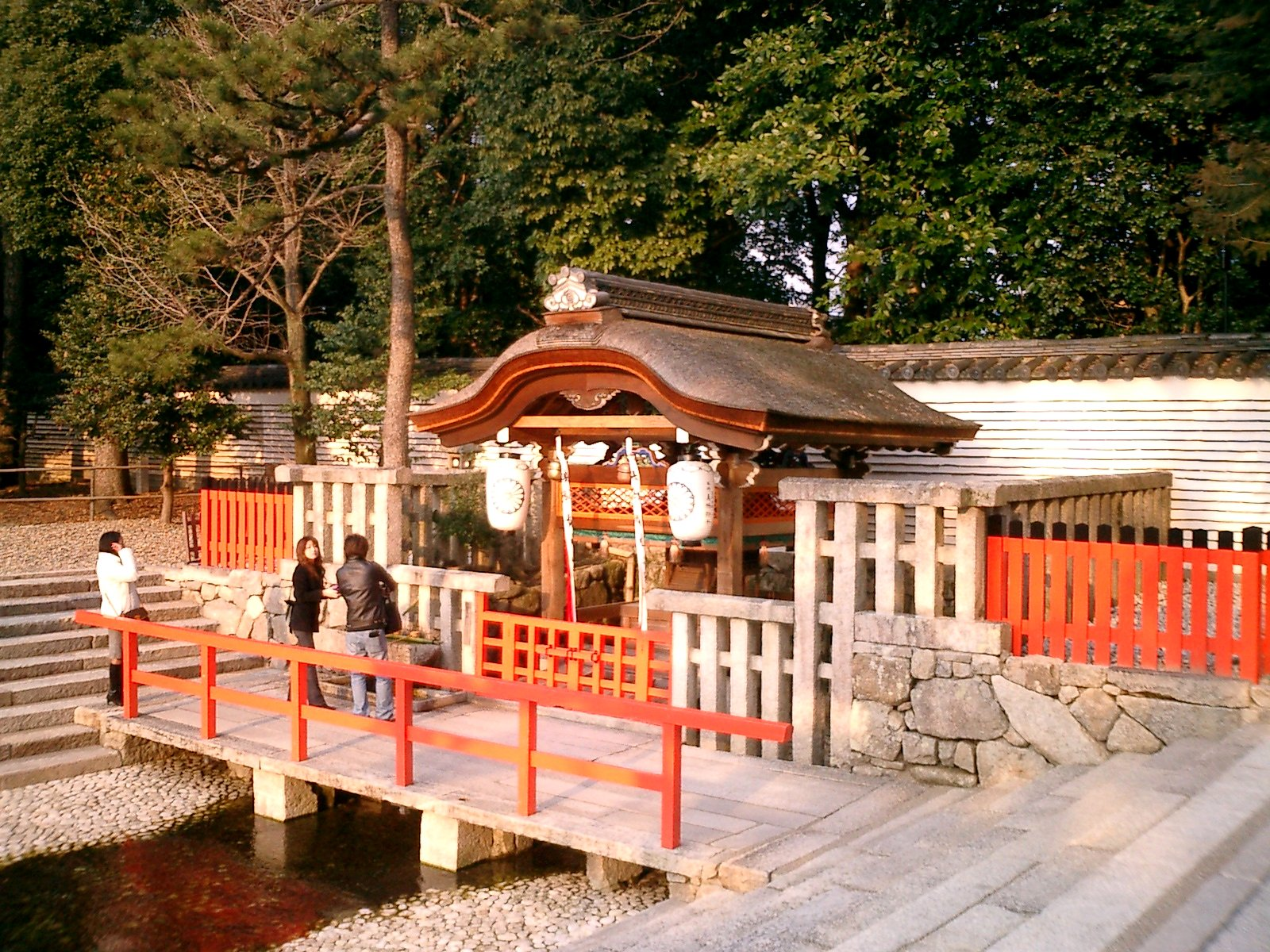
Mitarai-sha

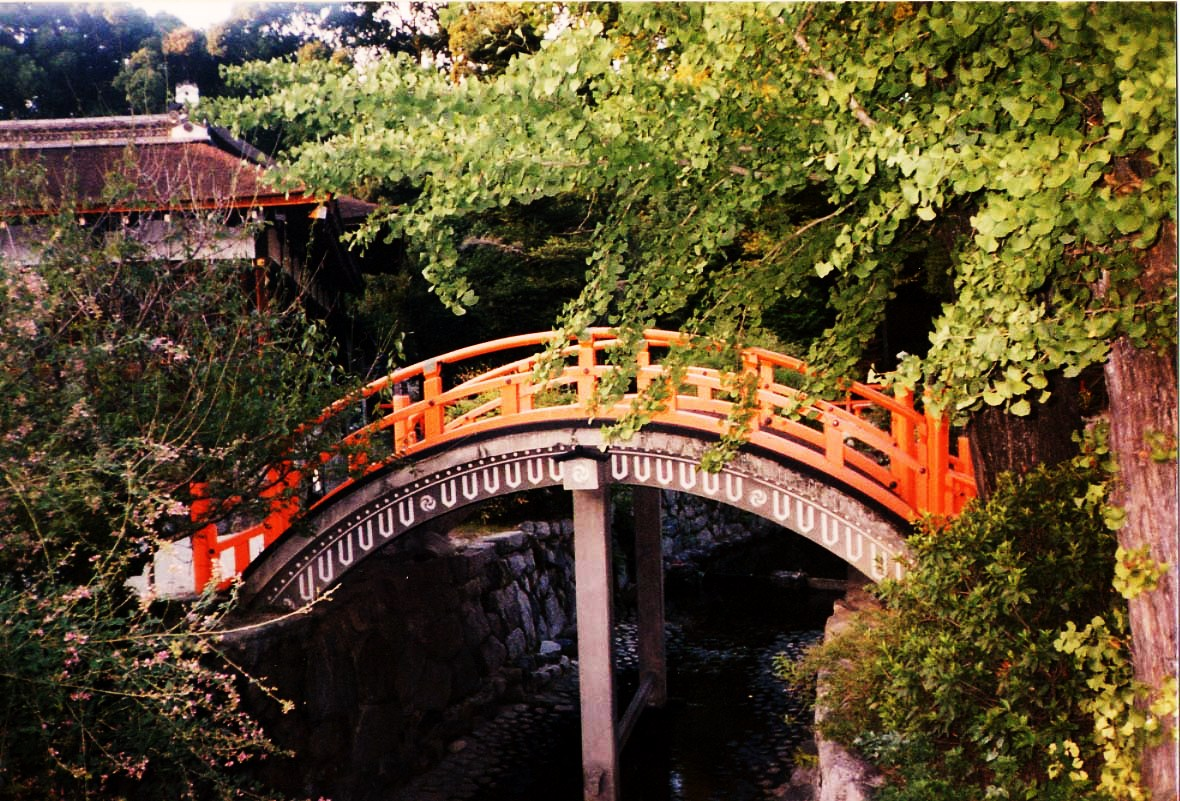
Taikobashi bridge

== See also ==
- List of Shinto shrines
- Twenty-Two Shrines
- Modern system of ranked Shinto shrines
- Mitarashi dango
