= Camo =

Camo or CAMO may refer to:

- Camouflage, particularly military camouflage
- Camo, Cuneo, a frazione of the province of Cuneo in north-west Italy
- Camo (app), a webcam app by British software company Reincubate
- "Camo", a single by BoA featured on the album One Shot, Two Shot
- CAMO (French: Club Aquatique de Montreal), a swim club in Montreal, Quebec, Canada
- Continuing Airworthiness Management Organisation
- Camo, a playable life dragon character in the Skylanders video game franchise
