= Kanamura Wake Ikazuchi Shrine =

Shinto shrine in Ibaraki Prefecture, Japan

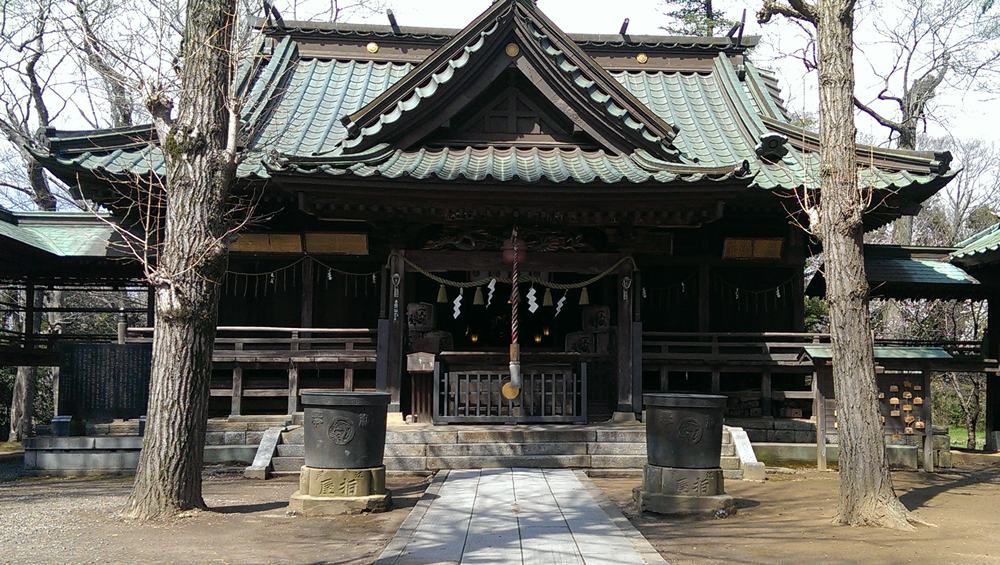
- Kanamura Wake Ikazuchi Shrine in Tsukuba, Ibaraki, Japan

- Location within Japan

Religion
- Affiliation: Shinto
- Deity: Kamo Wake-ikazuchi

Location
- Coordinates: 36°5′16.7″N 139°59′58.2″E

Kanamura Wake Ikazuchi Shrine (金村別雷神社, kanamura wake ikazuchi jinja) is a Shinto shrine in Tsukuba, Ibaraki, Japan. It is also called "Raijin-sama" and "Kanamura-sama" by locals. It is the second largest shrine in Tsukuba, after Mt. Tsukuba Shrine, and it is one of the three major Raijin shrines in the Kanto area. It is a Kamo shrine.

== History ==
It was founded on March 15, 931, during the reign of Emperor Suzaku, by a feudal lord named Toyoda-ko. It enshrines the thunder deity Kanamura-wake-ikazuchi-no-kami.

The shrine is west of Tsukuba in Kamigō, an urbanized area, but the surrounding area is fields, the Kokai River runs west of this area. To the north, on the other side of the Kikai River is Mototoyoda, site where the Toyoda Clan established a castle (Toyota Castle). Those areas in the past were controlled by the Toyoda Clan.

== Local festivals (Matsuri) ==
This deity is said to have a strong side, one that releases thunder to correct wrongs, and a gentle side, one that releases rain so that all living things can grow. It is especially popular with people seeking good fortune in agriculture. Festivals are held at this shrine in January (New Year's), April (Spring Festival), and November (Fall Festival).
