= Takitsuhiko =

Japanese deity

In Japanese mythology, Takitsuhiko (also Taki-tsu-hiko) is a god of waterfalls. He is known also as 'Prince Cataract', and is the son of Ajisukitakahikone as well as the nephew of Takemikazuchi.
