= Takano River =

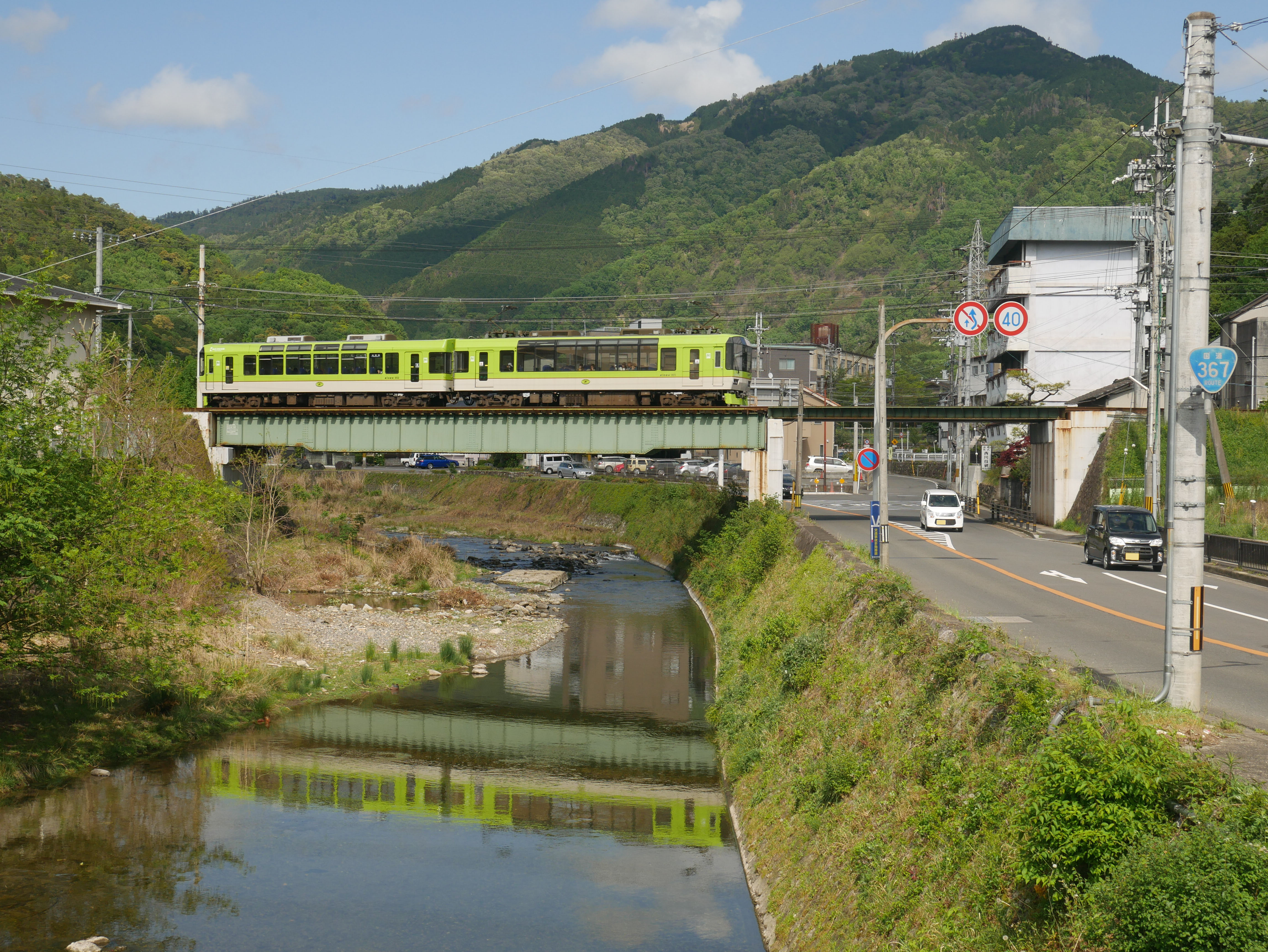
- Takano river from Hanazono bridge in Kyoto

- Location within Japan

Location
- Country: Japan

Physical characteristics
- Mouth
  - location: Kamo River
  - coordinates: 35°01′45″N 135°46′19″E

Basin features
- River system: Yodo River

The Takano River is located in Kyoto Prefecture, Japan.

The Kamo River and Takano River join on the Tadasu River Banks (Jp., Tadasu-gawara 糺河原). There is the "River Confluence" shrine of Shimogamo Shrine, leading to the forested area called Tadasu-no-mori.

== See also ==
- Kamo River
