= Tadasu no Mori =

Forest associated to Shinto shrines in Kyoto, Japan

Coordinates: 35°03′37″N 135°45′10″E

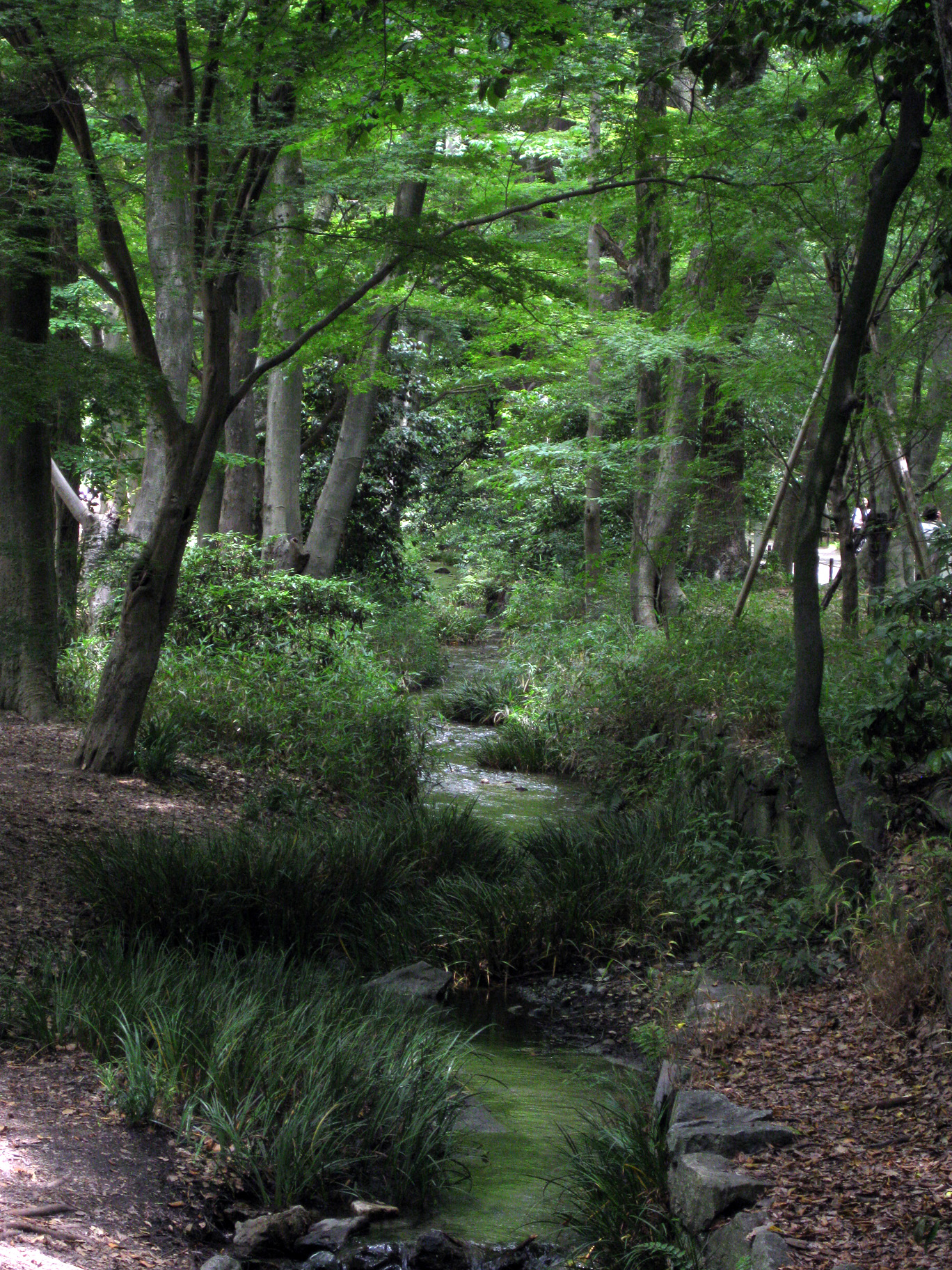
A wild tangle of undergrowth

Tadasu no Mori (糺の森), which literally translates to "Forest of Correction" or "Forest of Purification" in English, is located in the Sakyo Ward of Kyoto City, at the site of the Kamomioya Shrine. The forest itself is a sacred grove associated with an important Shinto sanctuary complex known in Japanese as the Kamo-jinja, situated near the banks of the Kamo River just north of where the Takano River joins the Kamo River in northeast Kyoto city, Japan. The term Kamo-jinja in Japanese is a general reference to Shimogamo Shrine and Kamigamo Shrine, the traditionally linked Kamo shrines of Kyoto. The Kamo-jinja serve the function of protecting Kyoto from malign influences.

Positioned at the convergence of the Kamo River and Takano River, the area of Tadasu No Mori's virgin forest encompasses about 12.4 hectares, or 124,500 square meters (more than double the size of Liberty Island where the Statue of Liberty stands).

== Historical overview ==
The preserved forest of Tadasu No Mori lies within the Shimogamo Shrine area, one of the seventeen historical sites in and around Kyoto which in 1994 were designated by UNESCO as Historic Monuments of Ancient Kyoto. It is today the last remnant of a primeval forest which is reputed to have never been burned down. The forest has, in fact, suffered some damage over the centuries when all of Kyoto was burned during successive revolts and wars, but the forest growth has rebounded again and again. The forest is left to grow in its natural state. It is neither planted nor pruned.

Originally in Ancient Kyoto, the forest spanned about 4.95 million square meters, however, Kyoto was the stage for multiple wars during the middle ages of Japan, including the Onin War (1467-1477). On June 14 1470, during the Onin War, 70% of Tadasu No Mori was burned to the ground. Additionally, some areas of the forest were then taken by the Shogunate via the land forfeit ordinances in the 4th year of the Meiji era, reducing the territory of Tadasu No Mori to its current size.

Since the period in which it was a part of the Yamashiro Province, the flora of Tadasu No Mori, the core of which is deciduous elm trees including the zelkova and the hackberry (nettle), has been largely maintained, totaling about 4,700 trees of 40 distinct species. The forest spans from the Kamo River to the Takano River upon a narrow strip of land running north-south between the two waterways. Many clear-water streams flow throughout the forest and feed into the two larger rivers, while the outskirts of the forest are also dense with vegetation which thrives along the riverside. Mentioned in "Tale of Genji" and "The Pillow Book" of ancient times, the forest continues to be a historic landmark, to this day offering a refuge of rest and relaxation.

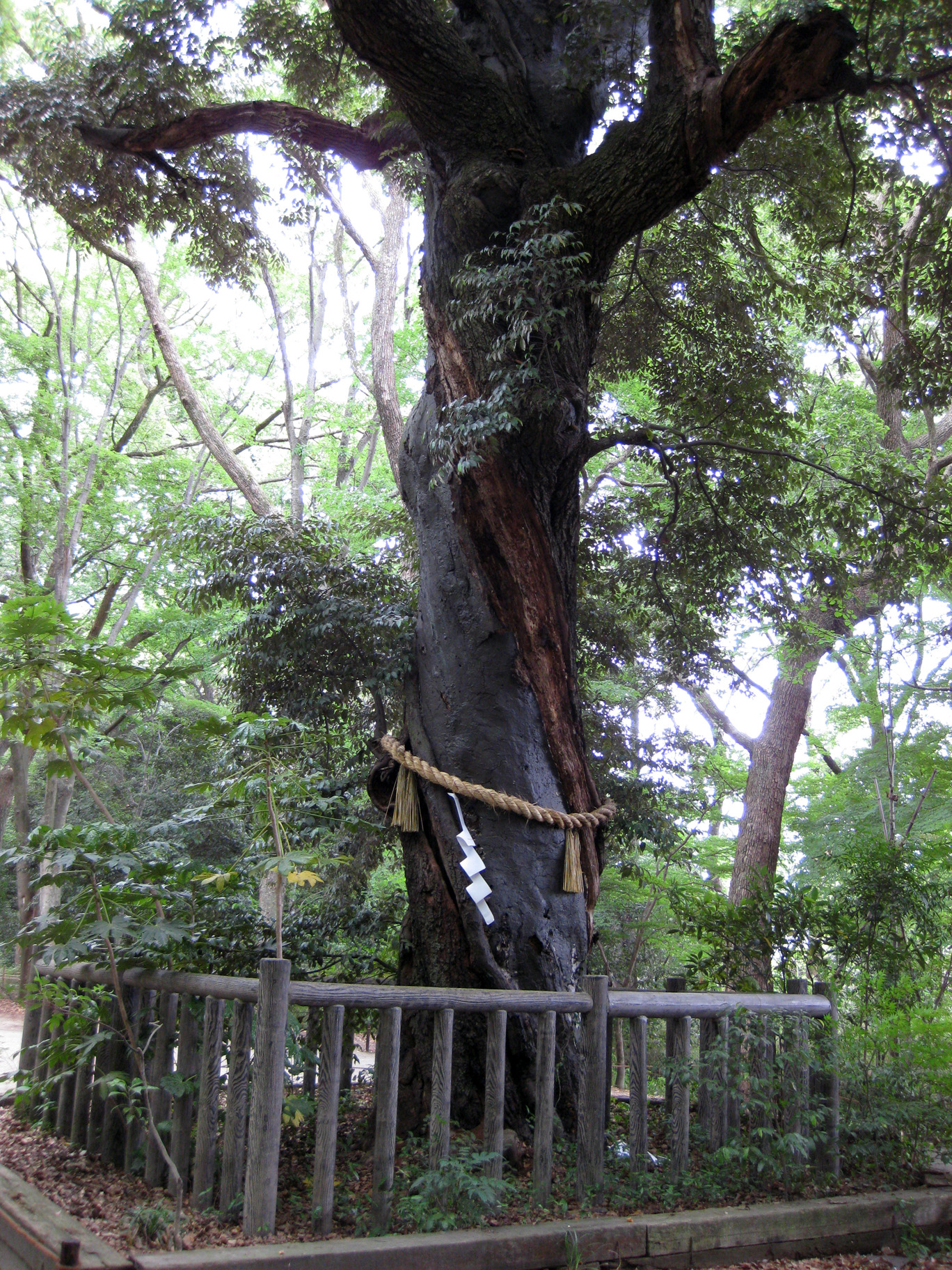
A tree singled out from amongst the others in the forest

== World Heritage site ==
In 1983, Tadasu No Mori was designated as a National Historic Site, protecting it as a site of ecological preservation. Then in 1994, Tadasu No Mori became a World Heritage site, as the entirety of the Shimogamo Shrine grounds, which encompasses the forest, was designated by UNESCO as a Historic Monuments of Ancient Kyoto, along with seventeen other sites in the Kyoto area.

== Ecology ==
Tadasu No Mori is referred to as an untouched virgin forest, but in reality, lots of human effort has been made to preserve the forest over the years. Tadasu No Mori is composed mostly of deciduous tree species, especially those commonly found along riversides. Additionally, many camphor trees were planted after the Muroto Typhoon of 1934 caused severe flooding which drowned much of the forest's vegetation. Other plants such as the red camellia were later planted to aid the function and aesthetic of the Shimogamo Shrine. In contrast to the generally dark and mysterious atmosphere of some shrines, the area of Tadasu No Mori is rather bright as there is not a dense presence of coniferous trees.

=== Climate ===
As the Kyoto Basin sits at a warm temperate zone of Japan, broad-leaf coniferous forests commonly develop in this region. During winter months, however, Tadasu No Mori, located at the northern most border of the Kyoto Basin, becomes far colder at night, making conditions unsuitable for the growth of conifers. Instead, broad-leaf deciduous forests grow strongly, particularly those of the Elm family.

=== Trees ===
Today, Tadasu No Mori is host to about mature 4,700 trees of diameter greater than 10 centimeters. In the near future, there will be about 600 trees within Tadasu No Mori between the ages of 200 and 600 years-old. In 1983, a survey of Tadasu No Mori's vegetation, led by a team from Kyoto University's Research Institute for Mathematical Sciences, found that 71.9% of the forest was Aphananthe aspera elm, 15.9% was of Japanese zelkova (keyaki), and many other species including Japanese hackberry (enoki), oak, camellia (tsubaki), purple holly (nanaminoki), laurel (aoki), and the Trachycarpus (shuro).

Tree Population of Tadasu No Mori (Tree trunk of circumference of 1 meter or greater)
	1939（Ikeda）		1991（Morimoto et al.）		2002 (Morimoto et al.）	
Species	Tree count	Percentage of total population (%)	Tree count	Percentage of total population (%)	本数	Percentage of Total Population. (%)
Aphananthe aspera elm	44	45.4	239	19.4	243	19.2
Japanese Zelkova	21	21.6	129	10.5	147	11.6
Red-bark oak	6	6.2	5	0.4	4	0.3
Japanese hackberry	4	4.1	233	18.9	254	20
Purple Holly	3	3.1	7	0.5	4	0.3
Japanese camellia	3	3.1	4	0.3	4	0.3
Dog Cherry	3	3.1	0	0	0	0
Japanese oak	2	2.1	29	2.3	36	2.8
Chinese elm	2	2.1	5	0.4	4	0.3
Chinquapin	1	1	76	6.1	79	6.2
Ginkgo biloba	1	1	26	2.1	30	2.3
Japanese cedar	1	1	23	1.8	30	2.3
Lusterleaf Holly	1	1	11	0.8	11	0.8
Indian soapberry	1	1	0	0	1	0
Japanese Nutmeg	1	1	0	0	0	0
Yellow catalpa	1	1	0	0	0	0
Magnolia kobus	1	1	0	0	0	0
Japanese Maple	1	1	0	0	0	0
Camphor	0	0	336	27.3	324	25.5
Ring cupped oak	0	0	28	2.2	26	2
Bamboo-leaf oak	0	0	10	0.8	14	1.1
other	0	0	63	3.8	56	4.4
TOTAL	97	100	1227	100	1267	100

=== Wildlife ===
Not many large mammals have been observed in Tadasu No Mori. In the 1960s there were sightings of the Japanese Squirrel (Sciurus lis), however, in recent years the squirrel's presence has vanished. In terms of birds, the Brown Hawk-Owl (Ninox scutulata), a migratory bird which generally spends winters in South East Asia, was observed on three instances nesting within hollow trees during a 2002 survey of Tadasu No Mori. Since elm trees often form hollow cavities, Tadasu No Mori is considered a suitable habitat for such birds.

== See also ==
- Chinju no Mori
