= Continuing airworthiness management organization =

Civil aviation organization

Continuing airworthiness management organisation (CAMO) is a civil aviation organization authorized to schedule and control continuing airworthiness activities on aircraft and their parts

The scope of the CAMO is to organise and manage all documents and publications for Maintenance Organizations Part 145 and Part M approved, like development and management of aircraft maintenance programmes fulfilled. A CAMO must also provide record keeping of maintenance performed. In other words, a CAMO is responsible to the Air Operator Certificate (AOC) holder. EASA has the power to give CAMO second privileges also but not in all cases. These second privileges allow the CAMO to conduct airworthiness review on aircraft, issue (or recommend for issue) Airworthiness Review Certificates and issue 'permit to fly' for maintenance check flights.

General requirements to be met by a CAMO are facilities (offices and documentation storage), a Continuing Airworthiness Management Exposition (CAME) which must be approved by the competent authority of the country or EASA and company procedures (to comply with Part M requirements). A CAMO can also be the operator of the aircraft.

Personnel required to be employed in a CAMO are the Accountable Manager (which can be the same person for CAMO and operator), the Quality Manager (to ensure all EASA requirements are in compliance) and appropriately qualified staff for airworthiness management. These personnel must be mentioned in the CAME. In case of second privileges Airworthiness Review Staff must be employed.

Like any other aviation organisation a CAMO is audited by authorities and must fulfill all requirements. Findings in audits are categorized in levels.

- Level 1 finding is a serious hazard to flight safety and the approval to operate can be revoked until a satisfactory correction is taken.
- Level 2 finding is non serious to flight safety, but must be taken care of because it can lead to a Level 1 finding.
