= Kamo, Armenia =

Village in Shirak, Armenia

Kamo Կամո
- Location within Armenia Location within Shirak
- Coordinates: 40°49′41″N 43°56′54″E
- Country: Armenia
- Province: Shirak
- Municipality: Akhuryan

Population (2011)
  - Total: 1,340
- Time zone: UTC+4
  - Summer (DST): UTC+5

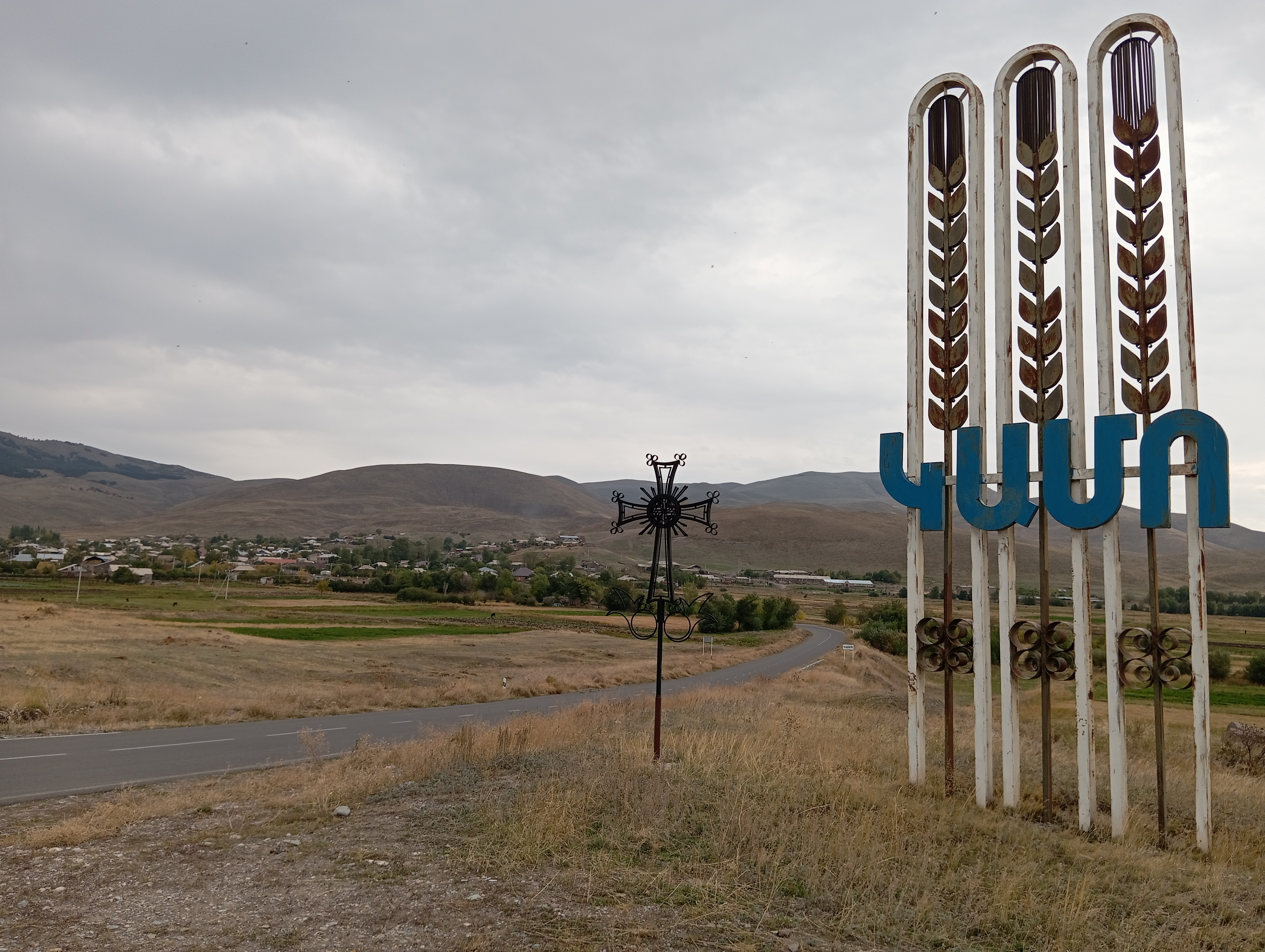

Kamo (Armenian: Կամո) is a village in the Akhuryan Municipality of the Shirak Province of Armenia. The village was named after Kamo, the nom de guerre of Simon Ter-Petrossian (1882-1922).

== Demographics ==
Historical population
Year	Pop.	±% p.a.
1831	414	—
1897	1,422	+1.89%
1926	1,290	−0.34%
1939	1,489	+1.11%
1959	1,334	−0.55%
1970	1,375	+0.28%
1979	1,283	−0.77%
2001	1,519	+0.77%
2011	1,340	−1.25%
