= Kamogawa =

Kamogawa may refer to:

- Kamo-gawa or Kamo River, a river through Kyoto City
- Kamogawa, Chiba, a city in Chiba Prefecture
  - Kamogawa Sea World
- 10143 Kamogawa, asteroid discovered 1994
