= Camo (app) =

App that allows mobile devices to be used as a webcam

- Developer: Reincubate
- Release: June 16, 2020; 6 years ago
- Operating system: Windows, macOS, iOS, Android (operating system)
- Available in: 11 languages
- List of languages English, French, Italian, Russian, others
- Type: Live streaming
- License: Proprietary
- Website: reincubate.com/camo

Camo is a freemium webcam app by British software company Reincubate allowing phones and other mobile devices to be used as webcams and document cameras.

The app runs on macOS and Microsoft Windows and is compatible with iOS and Android phones.

The app comes in a free and Pro version. The free version uses the mobile device's main camera, while the Pro version gives accesses to all cameras.

Camo studio (the mac or pc app) can use a camera on that device without the need for a mobile phone.

Camo studio can also be paired to an android or apple phone running the camo app to allow the mac/windows device to make use of what is generally a superior camera.
