= Kamo clan =

Japanese shake clan

Kamo clan 賀茂氏
- Mon of the Kamo clan
- Home province: Yamashiro
- Founder: Kamo no Okimi
- Founding year: 7th century
- Cadet branches: Miwa clan (possibly only in legend), Kadenokōji family

The Kamo clan (賀茂氏, Kamo-shi) is a Japanese shake clan which traces its roots from a Yayoi period shrine in northeastern Kyoto. The clan rose to prominence during the Asuka and Heian periods when the Kamo are identified with the 7th-century founding of the Kamo Shrine.

== Kamo Shrine ==
The Kamo Shrine's name references the area's early inhabitants, many of whom continue to live near the shrine their ancestors traditionally served. The formal names of corollary jinja memorialize vital clan roots in a history which pre-dates the founding of Japan's ancient capital.

The Kamo Shrine encompasses what are now independent but traditionally associated jinja or shrines—the Kamo-wakeikazuchi Shrine (賀茂別雷神社, Kamo-wakeikazuchi jinja) in Kyoto's Kita Ward and the Kamo-mioya Shrine (賀茂御祖神社, Kamo-mioya jinja) in Sakyo Ward. The jinja names identify the various kami or deities who are venerated; the name also refers to the nearby woods.

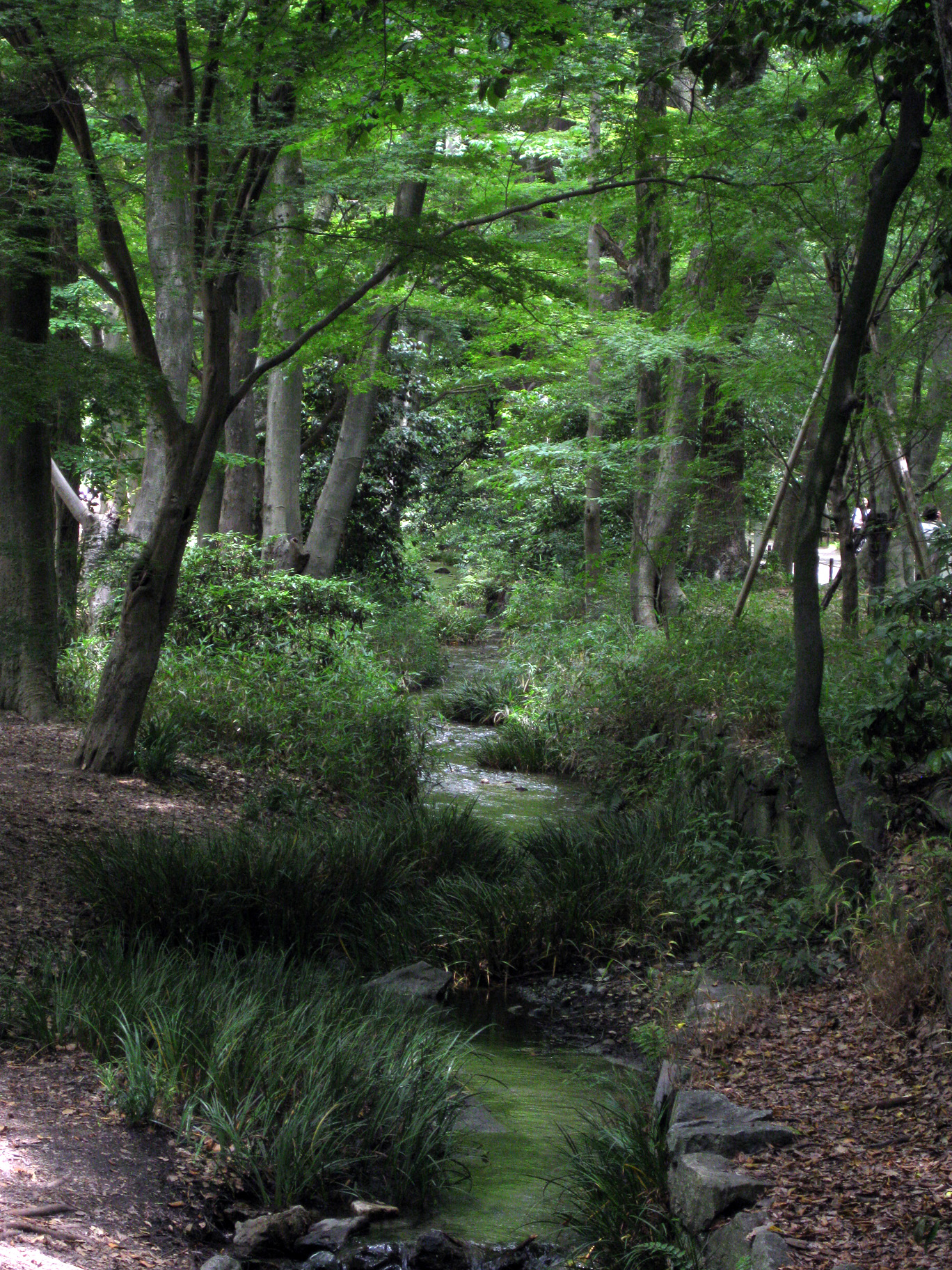
A wild vista unfolds at Tadasu no Mori.

Although now incorporated within boundaries of the city, the location was once Tadasu no Mori (糺の森), the wild forest home of the exclusive caretakers of the shrine from prehistoric times.

== Notable clan members ==
- Kamo no Chōmei (1155–1216)
- Kamo no Mabuchi (1697–1769)

Although Chōmei did not use the surname Tokugawa before 1566, his appointment as shōgun was contingent on his claim to Matsudaira kinship and a link to the Seiwa Genji. Modern scholarship has revealed that the genealogy proffered to the emperor contained falsified information; however, since the Matsudaira used the same crest as the Kamo clan, some academics suggest that he was likely a descendant of the Kamo clan."
