= Ajisukitakahikone =

Japanese deity

Ajisukitakahikone-no-Kami
- God of agriculture and thunder
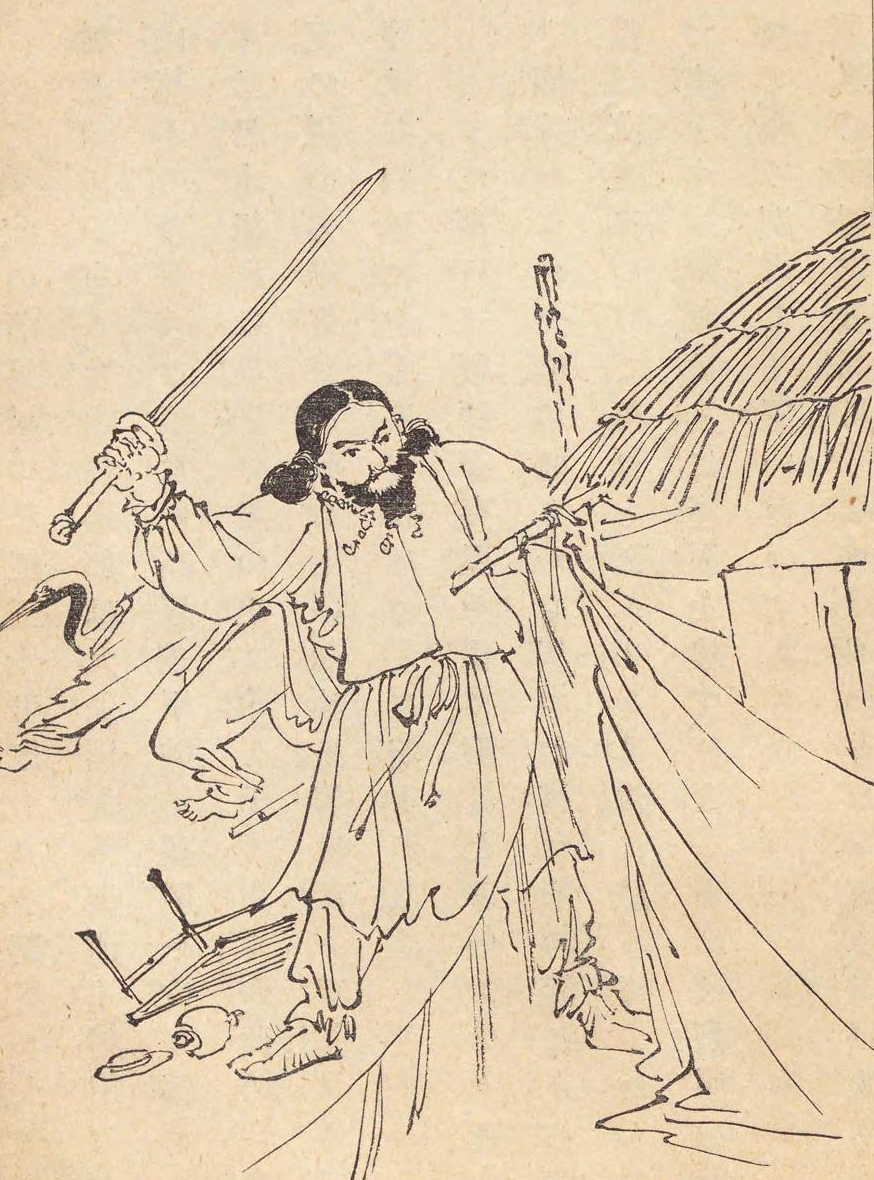
- Ajisukitakahikone destroys the hut where Ame-no-Wakahiko's corpse lay with his sword
- Other names: Ajishikitakahikone-no-Kami (阿遅志貴高日子根神, 阿遅志貴高日子根神, 阿治志貴高日子根神) Ajisukitakahiko-no-Mikoto (阿遅須枳高日子命); Ajisukitakahikone-no-Mikoto (味耜高彦根命, 阿遅須伎高孫根乃命, 味鉏高彦根尊); Takakamo-Ajisukitakahikone-no-Mikoto (高鴨阿治須岐託彦根命) Kamo-no-Ōmikami (迦毛之大御神)
- Japanese: 味耜高彦根神
- Major cult center: Takakamo Shrine, Asuki Shrine
- Texts: Kojiki, Nihon Shoki, Sendai Kuji Hongi, Izumo Fudoki, Harima Fudoki

Genealogy
- Parents: Ōkuninushi and Tagori-hime
- Siblings: Shitateru-hime, Kotoshironushi, Takeminakata and others (half-siblings)
- Consort: Ame-no-Mikajihime
- Children: Takitsuhiko, Yamuyabiko

Ajisukitakahikone (also Ajishikitakahikone or Ajisukitakahiko) is a kami in Japanese mythology. He is one of the sons of Ōkuninushi and the tutelary deity of Kamo.

== Name ==
The god is referred to both as 'Ajisukitakahikone-no-Kami' (阿遅鉏高日子根神; Old Japanese: Adisuki_{1}takapi_{1}ko_{1}ne-no_{2}-Kami_{2}) and 'Ajishikitakahikone-no-Kami' (阿遅志貴高日子根神; Man'yōgana: 阿治志貴多迦比古泥能迦微; O.J.: Adisiki_{2}takapi_{1}ko_{1}ne) in the Kojiki, while the Nihon Shoki consistently calls him 'Ajisukitakahikone-no-Kami' (味耜高彥根神). Renditions of the name found in other texts include 'Ajisukitakahiko-no-Mikoto' (阿遅須枳高日子命; Izumo Fudoki), 'Ajisukitakahikone-no-Mikoto-no-Kami' (阿遅須伎高日古尼命神; Harima Fudoki) and 'Ajisukitakahikone-no-Mikoto' (阿遅須伎高孫根乃命; Izumo-no-Kuni-no-Miyatsuko no Kan'yogoto).

Aji (O.J. adi) may mean either "excellent" (cf. aji "taste, flavor") or "flock, mass, many", while shiki (O.J. siki_{2}) is variously interpreted either as a corruption of suki (O.J. suki_{1}, "spade" or "plough"), a derivation from the Baekje word suki "village", a word meaning "blade", or a place name in Yamato Province. (One factor that complicates a proper interpretation of the name is that ki_{1} and ki_{2} are thought to be different syllables in Old Japanese.)

Basil Hall Chamberlain, in his 1882 translation of the Kojiki, left the name untranslated (noting that "[t]he meaning of the first two members of this compound name is altogether obscure"); likewise, William George Aston (1896) merely commented that there is "no satisfactory explanation of this name." Donald Philippi (1968) proposed two possible interpretations of the name: "Massed-Ploughs High-Princeling Deity" or "Excellent Shiki High-Princeling Deity" (with 'Shiki' being understood here to be a toponym). Gustav Heldt's translation of the Kojiki (2014) meanwhile renders the name as "Lofty Little Lad of Fine Plows".

== Mythology ==
=== Parentage ===
The Kojiki describes Ajisukitakahikone as one of the two children of the god Ōkuninushi by Tagori-hime, one of the three Munakata goddesses, the other being Shitateru-hime (also known as Takahime).

He is frequently portrayed as a baby who is unable to sleep. His mother carried him up and down a ladder in an attempt to make him sleep, this is what causes the sound of growing thunder. In infancy, his crying and screaming were so loud that he had to be placed in a boat and sailed around the islands of Japan until he was calm.

In adulthood, he was the father of Takitsuhiko, a rain god.

=== Ajisukitakahikone and Ame-no-Wakahiko ===
When the sun goddess Amaterasu and the primordial god Takamimusubi, the rulers of the heavenly realm of Takamagahara, decreed that the earth below (Ashihara-no-Nakatsukuni) should be ruled over by Amaterasu's progeny, they dispatched a series of messengers to its ruler, Ōkuninushi, to command him to cede supremacy over the land. One of these, Ame-no-Wakahiko, ended up marrying Shitateruhime, one of Ōkuninushi's daughters, and even plotted to gain the land for himself. After eight years had passed, a pheasant sent by the heavenly gods arrived and remonstrated with Ame-no-Wakahiko, who killed it with his bow and arrow. The arrow flew up to Takamagahara, but was then promptly thrown back to earth; it struck Ame-no-Wakahiko in the chest while he was asleep, killing him instantly.

During Ame-no-Wakahiko's funeral, Shitateruhime's brother Ajisukitakahikone, a close friend of Ame-no-Wakahiko, arrived to pay his condolences. As he closely resembled Ame-no-Wakahiko in appearance, the family of the deceased mistook him for Ame-no-Wakahiko come back to life. Offended at being mistaken for his friend (as corpses were regarded as unclean, to be compared with or mistaken for a dead person was seen as an insult), Ajisukitakahikone in anger drew his ten-span sword, hacked to pieces the funeral hut (喪屋 moya) where Ame-no-Wakahiko's corpse was laid and the funeral held, and then kicked it away. The ruined hut landed in the land of Mino and became a mountain called Moyama (喪山, lit. 'mourning mountain'). (Note: Two locations in Gifu Prefecture (the southern part of which is the historical province of Mino) have been suggested as possible candidates for this mountain or hill: a tumulus known as Moyama Kofun (喪山古墳) in Tarui, Fuwa District, and Moyama Tenjin Shrine (喪山天神社, Moyama-Tenjinja) in Ōyada, Mino City.)

Ajishikitakahikone, still fuming, then flew off, the radiance that exuded from him being such that it illuminated the space of two hills and two valleys. Shitateruhime, wishing to reveal to the mourners her brother's identity, then composed the following song in his honor:

Man'yōgana (Kojiki)
阿米那流夜
淤登多那婆多能
宇那賀世流
多麻能美須麻流
美須麻流能
阿那陀麻波夜
美多邇
布多和多良須
阿治志貴
多迦比古泥
能迦微曾

Japanese
天なるや
弟棚機の
うながせる
玉の御統
御統に
あな玉はや
み谷
二渡らす
阿遅志貴
高日子根の
神ぞ

Old Japanese
Ame_{2} naru ya
Oto_{2}-tanabata no_{2}
unagaseru
tama no_{2} misumaru
misumaru ni
anadama pa ya
mi_{1}tani
puta watarasu
Adisiki_{2}
Takapi_{1}ko_{1}ne no_{2}
Kami_{2} so_{2}

Modern Japanese (Rōmaji)
Ame naru ya
Oto-tanabata no
unagaseru
tama no misumaru
misumaru ni
anadama ha ya
mitani
futa watarasu
Ajishiki
Takahikone no
Kami zo

Translated by Donald Philippi
Ah, the large jewel (Note: Literally "hole-jewel" (anadama))

Strung on the cord of beads
Worn around the neck
Of the heavenly
Young weaving maiden!
Like this is he
Who crosses
Two valleys at once,
The god Ajishiki-
Takahikone!

== See also ==
- Ōkuninushi
- Takemikazuchi
- Ame-no-wakahiko
