= Ōkuninushi =

Deity (kami) in Japanese Shinto

- God of nation-building, agriculture, medicine, and protective magic
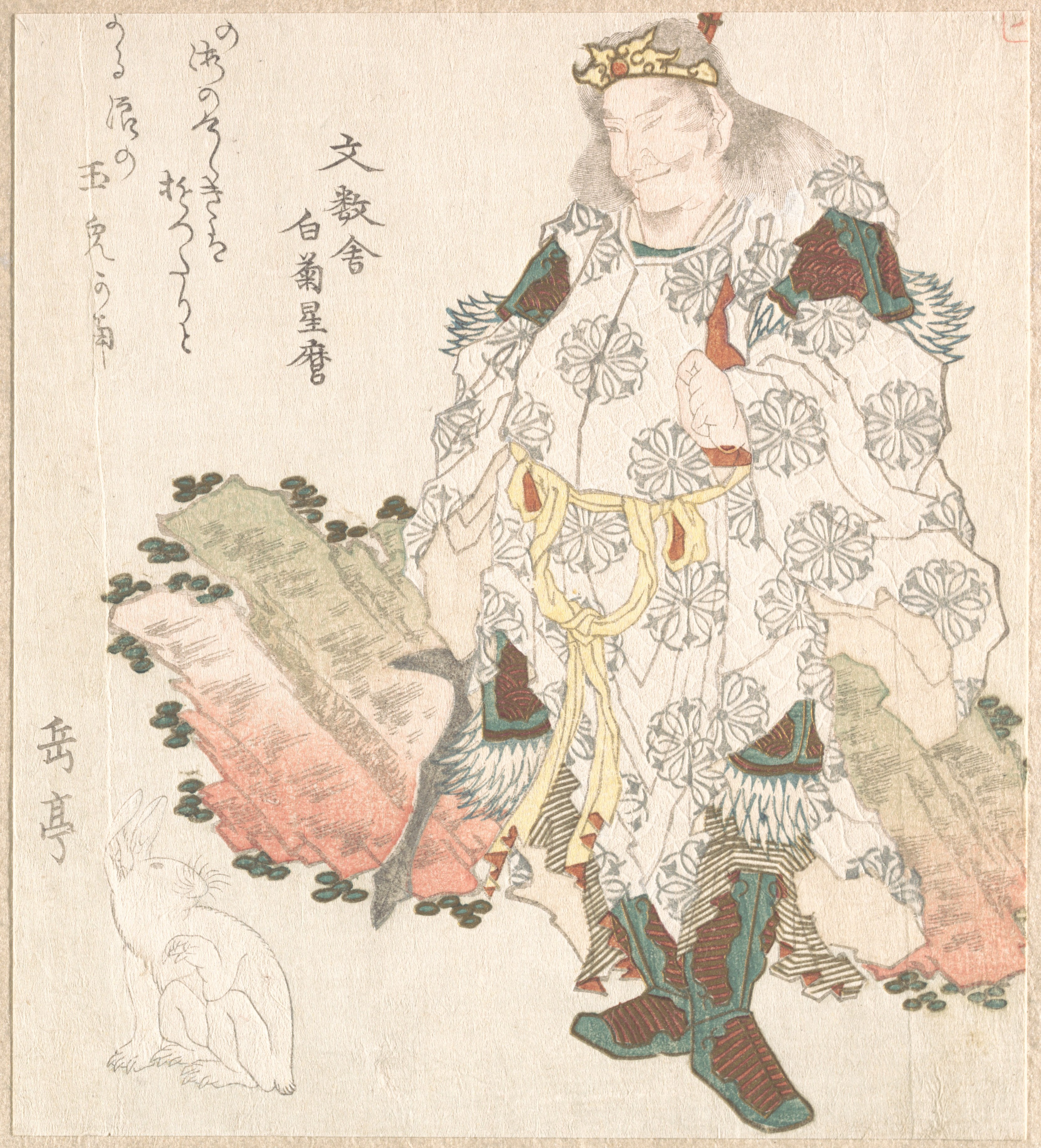
- Ōkuninushi, here portrayed as a wise old nobleman, with The White Hare of Inaba that he saved
- Other names: Ōanamuchi / Ōanamuji / Ōnamuji-no-Kami (大穴牟遅神) Ōnamuchi-no-Kami (大己貴神); Ōnamuchi-no-Mikoto (大己貴命, 大汝命); Ōanamochi-no-Mikoto (大穴持命); Ōnamochi-no-Kami (大名持神); Kunitsukuri Ōnamuchi-no-Mikoto (国作大己貴命); Ame-no-Shita-Tsukurashishi-Ōkami (所造天下大神); Ashihara-no-Shikoo (葦原色許男, 葦原醜男); Yachihoko-no-Kami (八千矛神, 八千戈神); Ōmononushi-no-Kami (大物主神) Ōkunitama-no-Kami (大国玉神); Utsushikunitama-no-Kami (宇都志国玉神, 顕国玉神); Kakuriyo-no-Ōkami (幽世大神) Daikoku-sama (大黒様, だいこくさま)
- Japanese: 大国主神
- Major cult center: Izumo Taisha, Ōmiwa Shrine and others
- Color: Black
- Texts: Kojiki, Nihon Shoki, Izumo Fudoki and others

Genealogy
- Parents: Ame-no-Fuyukinu and Sashikuniwakahime (Kojiki); Susanoo-no-Mikoto and Kushinadahime (Nihon Shoki)
- Siblings: Unnamed eighty brothers
- Consort: Yagamihime, Suseribime, Nunakawahime,Takiribime, Kamuyatatehime, Torimimi (Totori), and others
- Children: Kinomata (Kimata), Shitateruhime, Ajisukitakahikone, Kotoshironushi, Takeminakata and others

Ōkuninushi (大国主(おおくにぬし); historical orthography: オホクニヌシ, 'Ohokuninushi'), also known as Ō(a)namuchi (Oho(a)namuchi) or Ō(a)namochi (Oho(a)namochi) among other variants, is a kami (divine figure) in Japanese mythology. He is one of the central deities in the myth cycle recorded in the Kojiki (c. 712) and the Nihon Shoki (720) alongside the sun goddess Amaterasu and her brother, the wild god Susanoo, who is reckoned to be either Ōkuninushi's distant ancestor or father. In these texts, he is portrayed as the head of the kunitsukami (gods of the earth) and the original ruler of the lush terrestrial world, Ashihara no Nakatsukuni (葦原中国).

In an event called the kuni-yuzuri, the amatsukami (heavenly deities), led by Amaterasu, demanded that Ōkuninushi relinquish his rule over the land. He agreed to their terms and withdrew into the netherworld (幽世, kakuriyo), which was given to him to rule over in exchange.

The next event was the Tenson Kōrin: Amaterasu's grandson Ninigi descended from heaven to govern Ashihara no Nakatsukuni and became the ancestor of the Imperial House of Japan.

Ōkuninushi is closely associated with the Izumo Province (now Shimane Prefecture) in western Japan; indeed, the myth of his surrender to the amatsukami may reflect the subjugation and absorption of this area by the Yamato Kingship based in what is now Nara Prefecture. Aside from the Kojiki and the Shoki, the imperially-commissioned gazetteer report (Fudoki) of this province, dating from the early 7th century, contain many myths concerning Ōkuninushi (there named 'Ōanamochi') and related deities. Myths which feature Ōkuninushi or deities equated with him are also found in the Fudoki of other provinces, such as those of Harima (now southwestern Hyōgo Prefecture). He is also known for his romantic escapades with several goddesses, which resulted in many divine offspring, including the gods Kotoshironushi and Takeminakata.

He is enshrined in many shrines throughout Japan, with the Izumo-taisha in Shimane being the most famous and preeminent. The sectarian group Izumo-taishakyo, based at this shrine, considers Ōkuninushi its central deity and main focus of worship. He was also syncretized with the Buddhist deity Daikokuten in the shinbutsu-shūgō system prevalent before the Meiji era.

== Name ==
Ōkuninushi is referred to by the following names in the Kojiki:

- Ō(a)namuji-no-Kami (大穴牟遅神(おお(あ)なむぢのかみ); historical orthography: おほ(あ)なむぢ Ofo(a)namuji; Old Japanese: Opo(a)namudi) – The god's original name
- Ashihara-Shikoo (葦原色許男(あしはらしこお), "Ugly Man / Young Warrior of the Reed Plains"; hist. orthography: あしはらしこを; OJ: Asipara-Siko_{2}wo) – Used in three instances in the narrative proper
- Ōkuninushi-no-Kami (大国主神(おおくにぬしのかみ), "Master of the Great Land" / "Great Master of the Land"; hist. orthography: おほくにぬし Ofokuninushi; OJ: Opokuninusi) – One of two new names later given to Ōnamuji by Susanoo; used as the god's default name in the subsequent narrative
- Utsushikunitama-no-Kami (宇都志国玉神(うつしくにたまのかみ), "Spirit (tama) of the Living Land" / "Living Spirit of the Land"; OJ: Utusikunitama) – Another name bestowed by Susanoo
- Yachihoko-no-Kami (八千矛神(やちほこのかみ), "Eight Thousand Spears"; OJ: Yatipoko_{2}) – Used exclusively in the story of Ōkuninushi wooing Nunakawahime of Koshi
- Izumo-no-Ōkami (出雲大神(いずものおおかみ), "Great Deity of Izumo"; hist. orthography: いづものおほかみ, OJ: Idumo_{1}-no_{2}-Opokami_{2}) – Used in an anecdote in the annals of Emperor Suinin

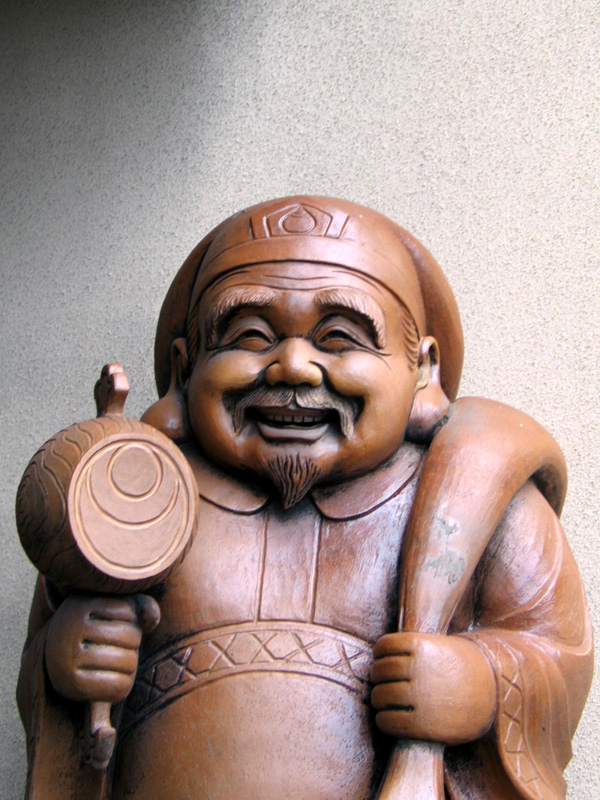
Ōkuninushi was popularly conflated with the deity Daikokuten (pictured).

In the Nihon Shoki, the god is mainly referred to as Ō(a)namuchi-no-Kami (大己貴神(おお(あ)なむちのかみ); hist. orthography: おほ(あ)なむち (Ofo(a)namuti); OJ: Opo(a)namuti) or Ō(a)namuti-no-Mikoto (大己貴命(おお(あ)なむちのみこと)). One variant cited in the text lists the same alternate names for Ōkuninushi as those found in the Kojiki, most of which are written using different characters.

- Ōkuninushi-no-Kami (大国主神)
- Ōmononushi-no-Kami (大物主神(おおものぬしのかみ) "Great Thing-Master" or "Great Spirit-Master"; hist. orthography: おほのもぬし Ofomononushi; OJ: Opomo_{2}no_{2}nusi) – Originally an epithet for the deity of Mount Miwa in Nara Prefecture. While seemingly portrayed as a distinct entity in the Kojiki, the Shoki depicts the two as essentially being the same entity, with Ōmononushi being Ōkuninushi's mitama 'aspect, spirit'
- Kunitsukuri Ōnamuchi-no-Mikoto (国作大己貴命(くにつくりおお(あ)なむちのみこと), "Maker of the Land, Ōnamuchi-no-Mikoto")
- Ashihara-Shikoo (葦原醜男)
- Yachihoko-no-Kami (八千戈神)
- Ōkunitama-no-Kami (大国玉神(おおくにたまのかみ), "Spirit of the Great Land" / "Great Spirit of the Land"; hist. orthography: おほくにたま Ofokunitama; OJ: Opokunitama)
- Utsushikunitama-no-Kami (顕国玉神)

The name Ō(a)namuchi or Ō(a)namochi is also used in other texts. The Fudoki of Izumo Province, for instance, refers to the god both as Ōanamochi-no-Mikoto (大穴持命) and as Ame-no-Shita-Tsukurashishi-Ōkami (所造天下大神, "Great Deity, Maker of All Under Heaven"). The Fudoki of Harima Province meanwhile uses Ōnamuchi-no-Mikoto (大汝命); a god found in this text known as Iwa-no-Ōkami (伊和大神, "Great Deity of Iwa") is also identified with Ōkuninushi.

As the first two characters of 'Ōkuninushi', 大国, can also be read as 'Daikoku', the god was conflated with the Buddhist divinity Daikokuten (Mahākāla) and came to be popularly referred to as Daikoku-sama (大黒様, だいこくさま).

== Genealogy ==
In the Kojiki, Ōnamuji / Ōkuninushi is the son of the god Ame-no-Fuyukinu (天之冬衣神) and his wife, Sashikuniwakahime (刺国若比売). The text thus portrays him as a sixth-generation descendant of the god Susanoo.

The Nihon Shoki's main narrative meanwhile depicts him as the offspring of Susanoo and Kushinadahime, although a variant cited in the same text describes Ōnamuchi as Susanoo's descendant in the sixth generation (in agreement with the Kojiki).

== Mythology ==
=== In the Kojiki ===
==== The White Hare of Inaba ====
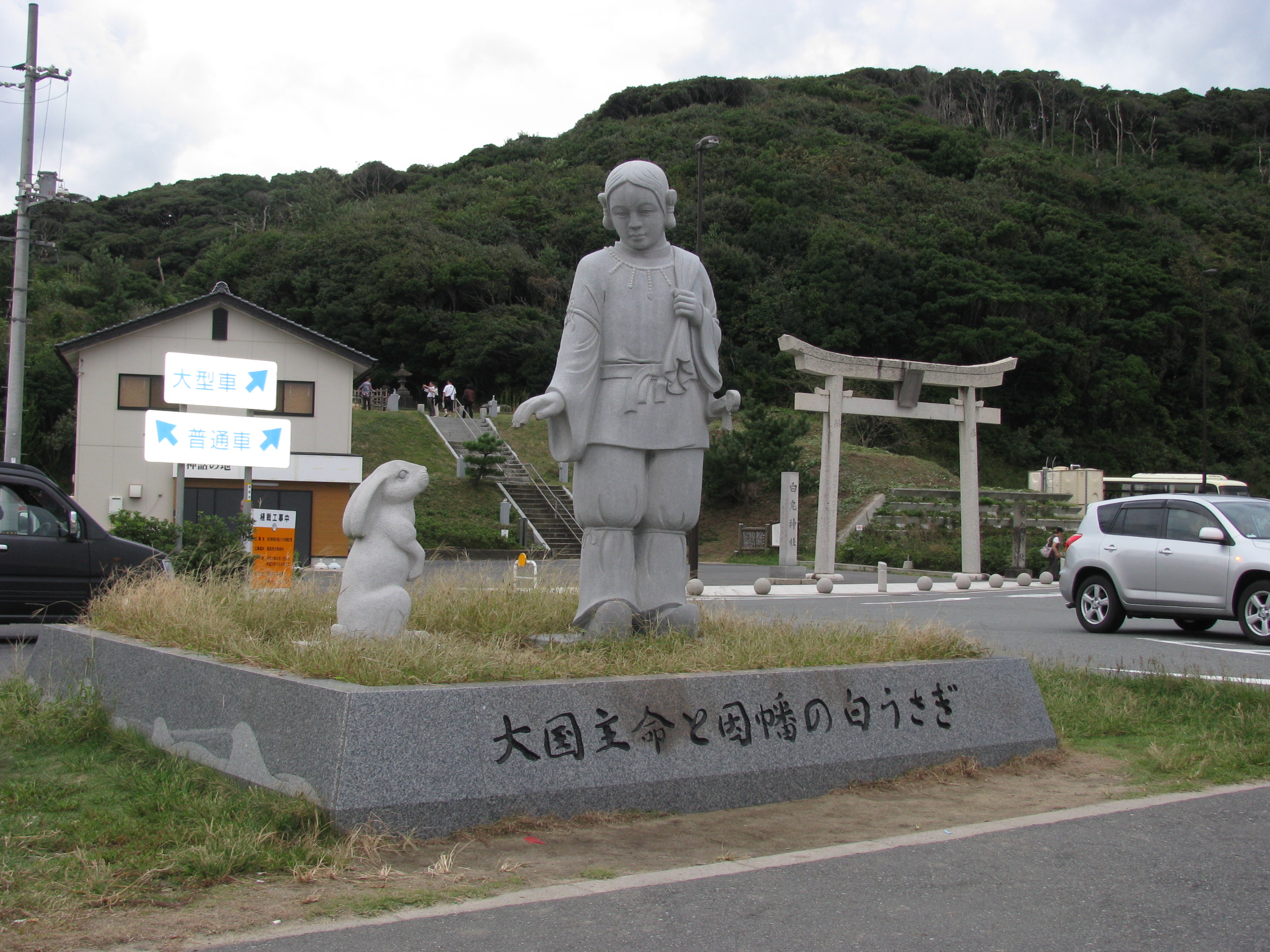
Statue of The White Hare of Inaba and Ōnamuji (Ōkuninushi) at Hakuto Shrine in Tottori, Tottori Prefecture

Ōkuninushi (as Ōnamuji) first appears in the Kojiki in the famous tale of The White Hare of Inaba. Ōnamuji's elder brothers, collectively known as the yasokami (八十神 'eighty deities', 'eighty' probably being an expression meaning 'many'), were all suitors seeking the hand of Yagamihime (八上比売) of the land of Inaba in marriage. As they were travelling together from their home country of Izumo to Inaba to court her, the brothers encounter a rabbit, flayed and raw-skinned, lying in agony upon the Cape of Keta (気多前 Keta no saki, identified with Hakuto Coast in Tottori Prefecture). Ōnamuji's brothers, as a prank, instructed the hare to wash itself in the briny sea and then blow itself dry in the wind, but this only made the hare's pain worse.

Ōnamuji, acting as his brothers' bag-carrier, then finds the hare. Upon being asked what happened, the hare explains that it came from the island of Oki across the sea and tricked a number of wani (和邇, the term may mean either 'shark' or 'crocodile') into forming a bridge for it to cross. But before the hare had completely gotten ashore to safety, it gloated about having tricked them; in retaliation, the last wani in line then grabbed it and tore off its fur. Ōnamuji then advised the hare to wash itself in fresh water and then roll in the pollen of cattail grass. Upon doing so, the hare recovered from its injuries. In gratitude, it predicts that Ōnamuji will be the one to win the princess.

This rabbit said to Ōnamuji-no-Kami:

"These eighty deities will certainly never gain Yagamihime. Although you carry their bags, you shall gain her."
At this time Yagamihime replied to the eighty deities:

"I will not accept your offers. I will wed Ōnamuji-no-Kami."

==== Attempts on Ōnamuji's life ====
Ōnamuji's brothers, furious at having been rejected by Yagamihime, then conspired to slay him. They first bring Ōnamuji to the foot of Mount Tema in the land of Hōki and compelled him, on pain of death, to catch a red boar (in reality a boulder heated red-hot and rolled down the mountain by them). Ōnamuji was burned to death upon grabbing the rock, but his mother, Sashikuniwakahime, went up to heaven and petitioned the primordial deity Kamimusubi for aid. Kamimusubi dispatched two clam goddesses, Kisagaihime (𧏛貝比売) and Umugihime (蛤貝比売), who then restored Ōnamuji to life as a handsome young man.

The brothers next tricked Ōnamuji into walking onto a fresh tree log split open and held apart by a wedge, and snapped it shut, killing him a second time. His mother revived him once again and bade him to seek refuge with the god Ōyabiko-no-Kami (大屋毘古神) in the land of Ki. Ōnamuji's brothers caught up with him as he was escaping, but he eluded their grasp by slipping through a fork of a tree.

==== Ōnamuji and Suseribime ====
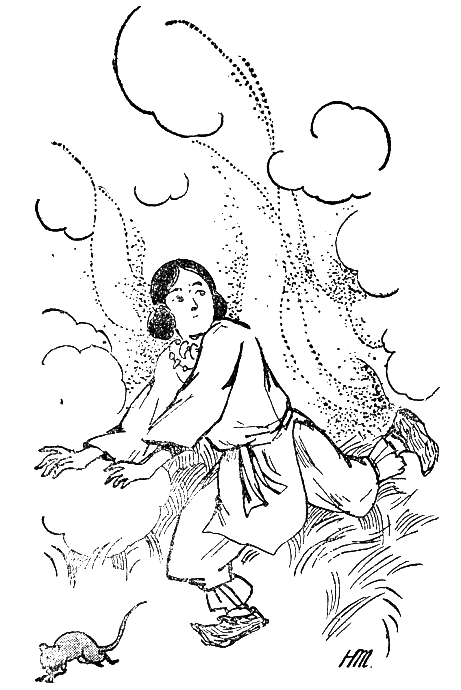
Ōnamuji being aided by a mouse

Ōnamuji was told to seek out Susanoo, who dwelt in the underworld of Ne-no-kuni to obtain wise counsel. There he met Susanoo's daughter, Suseribime (須勢理毘売), with whom he shortly fell in love. Upon learning of their affair, Susanoo imposed four trials on Ōnamuji:

- Susanoo first invited Ōnamuji to his palace and had him sleep in a room full of snakes. Suseribime aided Ōnamuji by giving him a magical scarf which protected him.
- The following night, Susanoo had Ōnamuji sleep in another room full of centipedes and bees. Suseribime again gave Ōnamuji a scarf that repelled the insects.
- Susanoo shot an arrow into an enormous meadow and had Ōnamuji fetch it. As Ōnamuji was busy looking for the arrow, Susanoo set the field on fire. A field mouse showed Ōnamuji a hole where he could hide and brought him the arrow.
- Susanoo, upon discovering that Ōnamuji had survived, summoned him back to his palace and had him pick the lice and centipedes from his hair. Using a mixture of red clay and nuts given to him by Suseribime, Ōnamuji pretended to chew and spit out the insects he was picking.

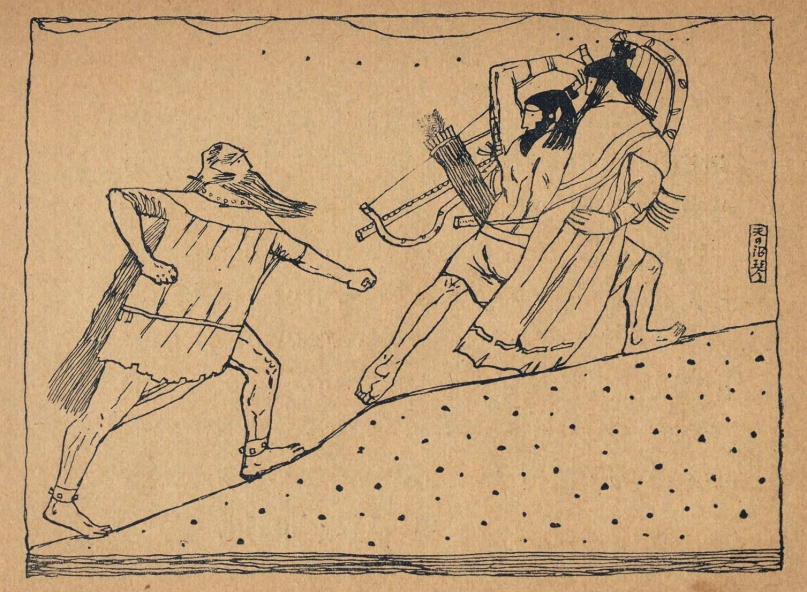
Ōnamuji and Suseribime escaping from Ne-no-Kuni (Natori Shunsen)

After Susanoo was lulled to sleep, Ōkuninushi tied Susanoo's hair to the rafters of the palace and fled with Suseribime, also taking Susanoo's bow and arrows and koto with him. When the couple made their escape, the koto brushed against a tree, awakening Susanoo. The god jumped up, bringing down his palace around him. Susanoo then pursued them as far as Yomotsu Hirasaka, the slopes at the border of the underworld. As the two were fleeing, Susanoo grudgingly gave his blessing to Ōnamuji, renaming him Master of the Great Land (大国主, Ōkuninushi) and Spirit of the Living Land (宇都志国玉, Utsushi-kuni-tama).

Using Susanoo's weapons, Ōkuninushi defeats his wicked brothers and becomes the undisputed ruler of the terrestrial realm, Ashihara no Nakatsukuni, the 'Central Land of Reed Plains'.

==== Ōkuninushi's affairs ====
Ōkuninushi begins the monumental task of creating and pacifying Ashihara no Nakatsukuni. In accordance with their previous betrothal, he marries Yagamihime and brings her to his palace, but she, fearing Suseribime (who had become Ōkuninushi's chief wife), eventually went back to Inaba, leaving her newborn child wedged in the fork of a tree. The child was thus named 'Ki(no)mata-no-Kami' (木俣神, from ki (no) mata "tree fork").

Ōkuninushi – in this section of the narrative given the name Yachihoko-no-Kami (八千矛神, "Deity of Eight Thousand Spears") – then wooed a third woman, Nunakawahime (沼河比売) of the land of Koshi, singing the following poem:

The god
Yachihoko,
Unable to find a wife
In the land of the eight islands,
Hearing that
In the far-away
Land of Koshi
There was a wise maiden,
Hearing that
There was a fair maiden,
Set out
To woo her,
Went out
To win her.

Not even untying
The cord of my sword,
Not even untying
My cloak,
I stood there
And pulled and shoved
On the wooden door
Where the maiden slept.

Then, on the verdant mountains,
The nue bird sang.
The bird of the field,
The pheasant resounded.
The bird of the yard,
The cock crowed.
Ah how hateful
These birds for crying!
Would that I could make them
Stop their accursed singing! [...]

Nunakawahime answers him with another song, which goes in part:

O deity
Yachihoko!
Since I am but a woman,
Supple like the pliant grass,
My heart is fluttering
Like the birds of the seashore.
Although now I may be
A free, selfish bird of my own;
Later, I shall be yours,
A bird ready to submit to your will.
Therefore, my lord, be patient;
Do not perish with yearning.

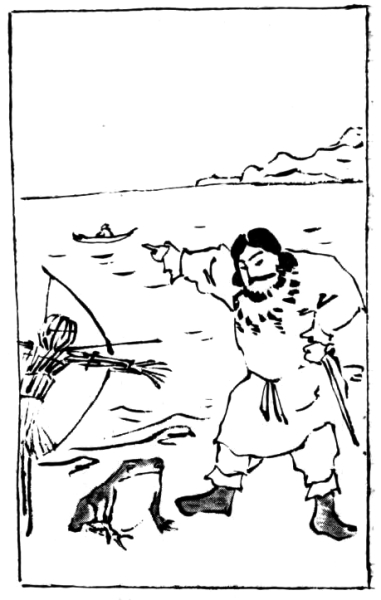
Ōkuninushi asking a toad and the scarecrow god Kuebiko about the newly arrived Sukunabikona

Upon learning of her husband's dalliance with Nunakawahime, Suseribime became extremely jealous. Feeling harassed, Ōkuninushi prepares to leave Izumo for Yamato. Suseribime then offers Ōkuninushi a cup filled with sake, begging him (also via song) to stay with her. Ōkuninushi and Suseribime were thus reconciled.

In addition to these three goddesses, Ōkuninushi also took three other wives and had children by them: Takiribime-no-Mikoto (多紀理毘売命), one of three goddesses born when Susanoo and Amaterasu held a ritual pact (ukehi) to prove Susanoo's innocence long ago, Kamuyatatehime-no-Mikoto (神屋楯比売命), and Torimimi-no-Kami (鳥耳神), also known as Totori-no-Kami (鳥取神).

==== Ōkuninushi, Sukunabikona and Ōmononushi ====
When Ōkuninushi was at the Cape of Miho in Izumo, a tiny god riding on the waves of the sea in a bean-pod appears and comes to him. Ōkuninushi asked the stranger his name, but he would not reply. A toad then told Ōkuninushi to ask Kuebiko (久延毘古), a god in the form of a scarecrow who "knows all things under the heavens." Kuebiko identifies the dwarf as Sukunabikona-no-Kami (少名毘古那神), a son of Kamimusubi. At Kamimusubi's command, Ōkuninushi formed and developed the lands with Sukunabikona at his side. Eventually, however, Sukunabikona crossed over to the "eternal land" (常世国, tokoyo no kuni) beyond the seas, leaving Ōkuninushi without a partner. As Ōkuninushi lamented the loss of his companion, another god appears, promising to aid Ōkuninushi in his task if he will worship him. Ōkuninushi then enshrined the deity – identified in a later narrative as Ōmononushi-no-Kami (大物主神) – in Mount Mimoro in Yamato in accordance with the latter's wish.

==== The transfer of the land (Kuni-yuzuri) ====
After a time, the gods of Takamagahara, the 'High Plain of Heaven', declare that Ōkuninushi's realm, Ashihara no Nakatsukuni, must be turned over to their rule. Amaterasu decrees that Ame-no-Oshihomimi-no-Mikoto (天忍穂耳命), one of five male deities born during Amaterasu's and Susanoo's ukehi ritual that Amaterasu subsequently adopted as her sons, shall take possession of the land, but Ame-no-Oshihomimi, after inspecting the earth below and deeming to be in an uproar, refuses to go. A second son, Ame no hohi (天菩比命) was then sent, but ended up currying favor with Ōkuninushi and did not report for three years. The third messenger, Ame-no-Wakahiko (天若日子), ended up marrying Shitateruhime (下照比売), Ōkuninushi's daughter with Takiribime. After he did not send word back for eight years, the heavenly deities sent a pheasant to question Ame-no-Wakahiko, which he killed with his bow and arrow. The bloodied arrow, after it flew up to heaven, was thrown back to earth, killing Ame-no-Wakahiko in his sleep. During Ame-no-Wakahiko's funeral, Shitateruhime's brother and Ame-no-Wakahiko's close friend Ajisukitakahikone (阿遅志貴高日子根) is furious at being mistaken for the dead god (whom he resembled in appearance) and destroys the mourning house where the funeral was held.

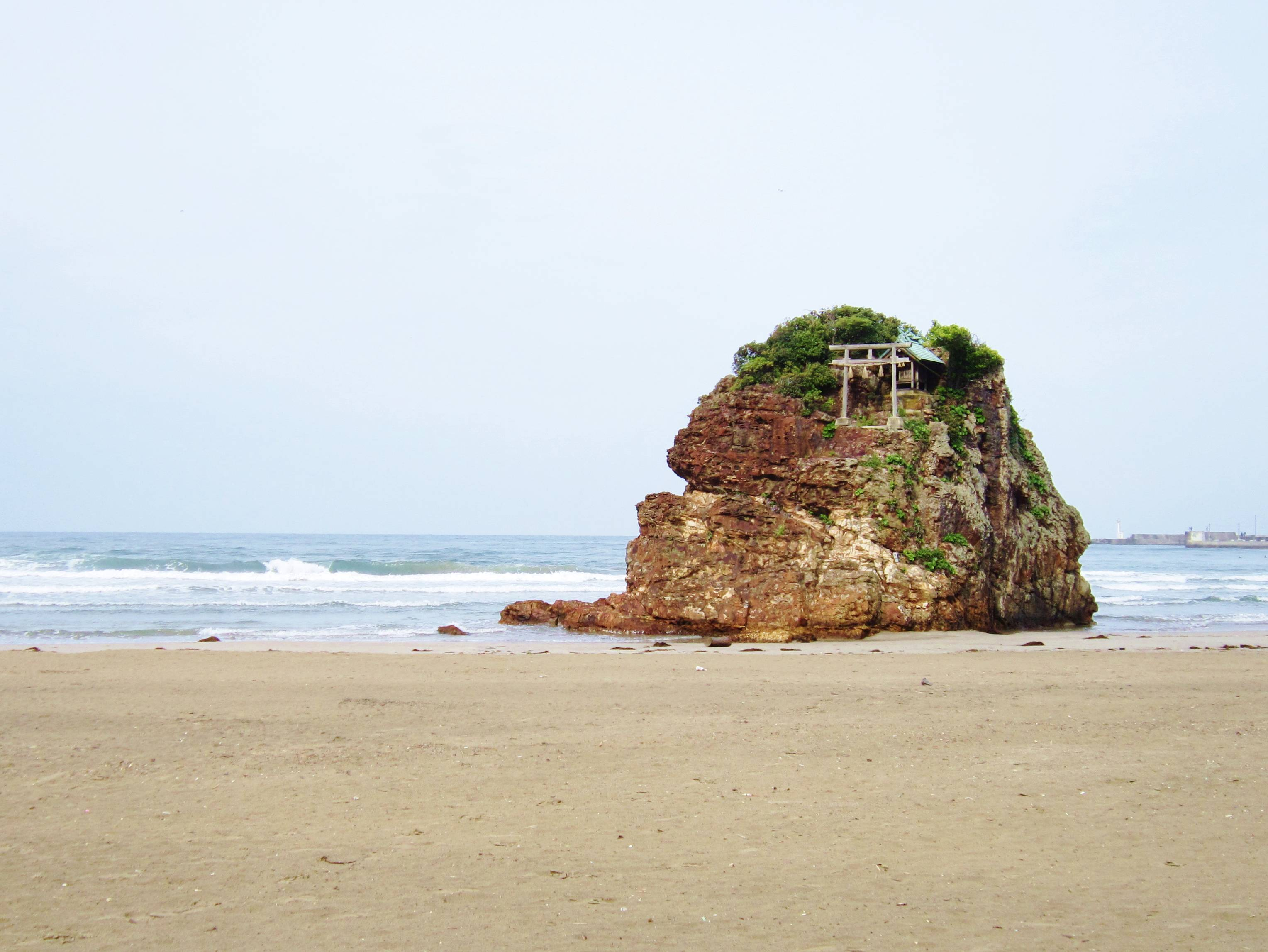
Inasa Beach, Shimane Prefecture

The heavenly deities then dispatch the warrior god Takemikazuchi-no-Kami (建御雷神), who descends on the shores of Inasa (伊那佐之小浜, Inasa no ohama) in Izumo. Ōkuninushi tells Takemikazuchi to confer with his son Kotoshironushi-no-Kami (事代主神), his son with Kamuyatatehime, who had gone hunting and fishing in the Cape of Miho. After being questioned, Kotoshironushi accepts the demands of the heavenly kami and disappears. When Takemikazuchi asks if Ōkuninushi has any other sons who ought to be consulted, another son, Takeminakata-no-Kami (建御名方神), appears and challenges Takemikazuchi to a test of strength. Takemikazuchi defeats Takeminakata, who flees to the sea of Suwa in the land of Shinano and surrenders. After hearing that his two sons have submitted, Ōkuninushi relinquishes his control of the land. Making a final request that a magnificent palace – rooted in the earth and reaching up to heaven – be built in his honor, he withdrew himself into the "less-than-one-hundred eighty-road-bendings" (百不足八十坰手, momotarazu yasokumade; i.e. the unseen world of the spirit) and disappeared from the physical realm.

==== Prince Homuchiwake ====
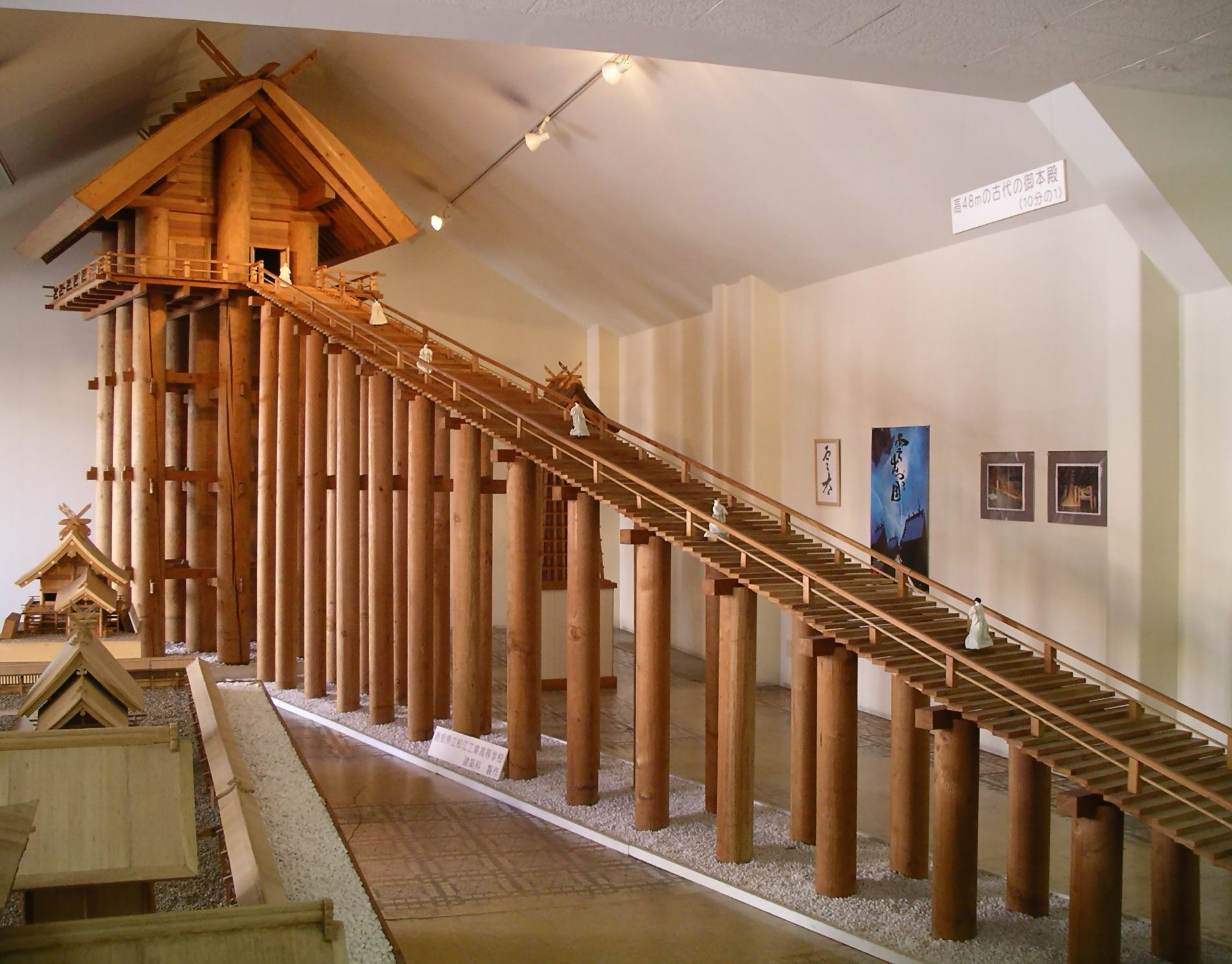
Scale model reconstruction of the ancient honden of Izumo Taisha

Ōkuninushi indirectly appears in a narrative set during the reign of Emperor Suinin.

Prince Homuchiwake (本牟智和気命), Suinin's son with his first chief wife Sahohime (狭穂姫命, also Sawajihime), was born mute, unable to speak "[even when his] beard eight hands long extended down over his chest" until he heard the cry of a swan (or a crane), at which he babbled his first words. A servant named Yamanobe no Ōtaka (山辺大鶙) was dispatched to seize the bird, which he pursued across long distances until he finally caught it in the river-mouth of Wanami (和那美之水門, Wanami no minato) in Koshi. The captured bird was brought before Homuchiwake, but the prince was still unable to talk freely. In a dream, Suinin heard a god demanding that his shrine "be built like the emperor's palace," at which the prince will gain the power of speech. The emperor then performed divination (futomani), which revealed Homuchiwake's condition to have been due to a curse (tatari) laid by the "great deity of Izumo" (出雲大神, Izumo-no-Ōkami; i.e. Ōkuninushi). Suinin then bade his son to worship at the god's shrine. After going to Izumo, Homuchiwake and his entourage stopped by the Hi River (known today as the Hii River), where a pontoon bridge and a temporary dwelling was built for the prince. Homuchiwake, upon seeing a mountain-like enclosure made of leaves being set up on the river, was finally cured of his muteness and spoke coherently.

When they were about to present his food, the prince spoke:

"That down river which is like a mountain of green leaves, looks like a mountain but is not a mountain. Could it be the ceremonial place of the priests who worship Ashihara-Shikoo-no-Ōkami in the shrine of So at Iwakuma in Izumo?"

[Thus] he inquired.

Then the princes, his attendants, heard and rejoiced, saw and were glad, and causing the prince to remain in [the place] Ajimasa-no-Nagaho-no-Miya, they sent urgent messengers [to the emperor].

== See also ==
- Izumo-taisha
- Kotoshironushi
- Susanoo
- Takeminakata
- Yue Lao
  - Red thread of fate

== Bibliography ==
- Aoki, Michiko Y., tr. (1997). Records of Wind and Earth: A Translation of Fudoki, with Introduction and Commentaries. Association for Asian Studies, Inc. ISBN 978-0924304323.
- Aston, William George, tr. (1896). Nihongi: Chronicles of Japan from the Earliest Times to A.D. 697. London: Kegan Paul, Trench, Trübner & Co.
- Chamberlain, Basil, tr. (1882). A Translation of the "Ko-Ji-Ki," or "Records of Ancient Matters". Yokohama: Lane, Crawford & Co.
- Kuroita, Katsumi (1943). Kundoku Nihon Shoki, vol. 1 (訓読日本書紀 上巻). Iwanami Shoten.
- Philippi, Donald L., tr. (2015). Kojiki. Princeton University Press. ISBN 978-1400878000.
- Takeda, Yūkichi, ed. (1956). "Kōchū Kojiki (校註 古事記)". 青空文庫 Aozora Bunko.
