= White Hare of Inaba =

Japanese myths

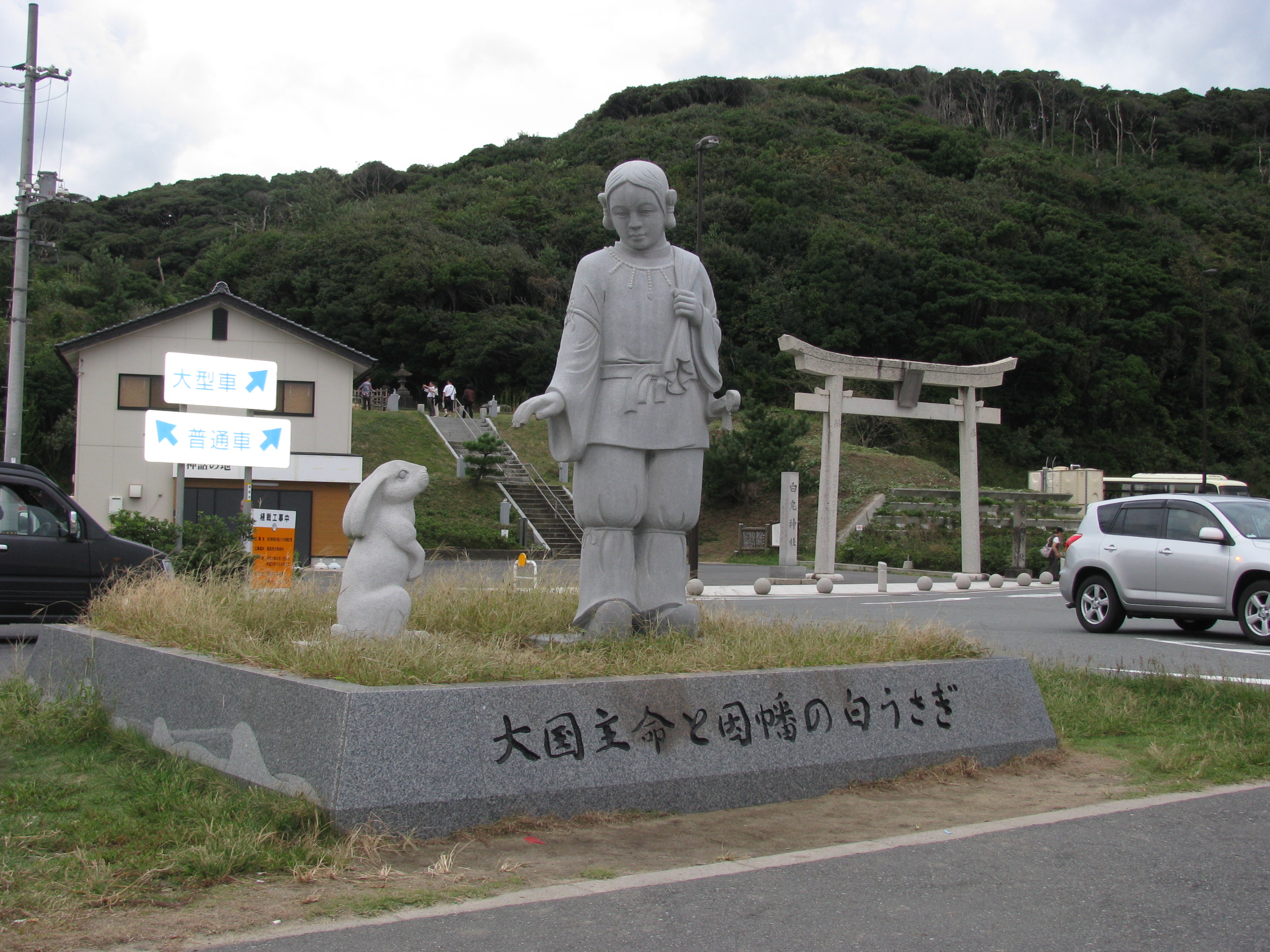
The White Hare of Inaba and Ōnamuchi-no-kami at Hakuto Shrine in Tottori

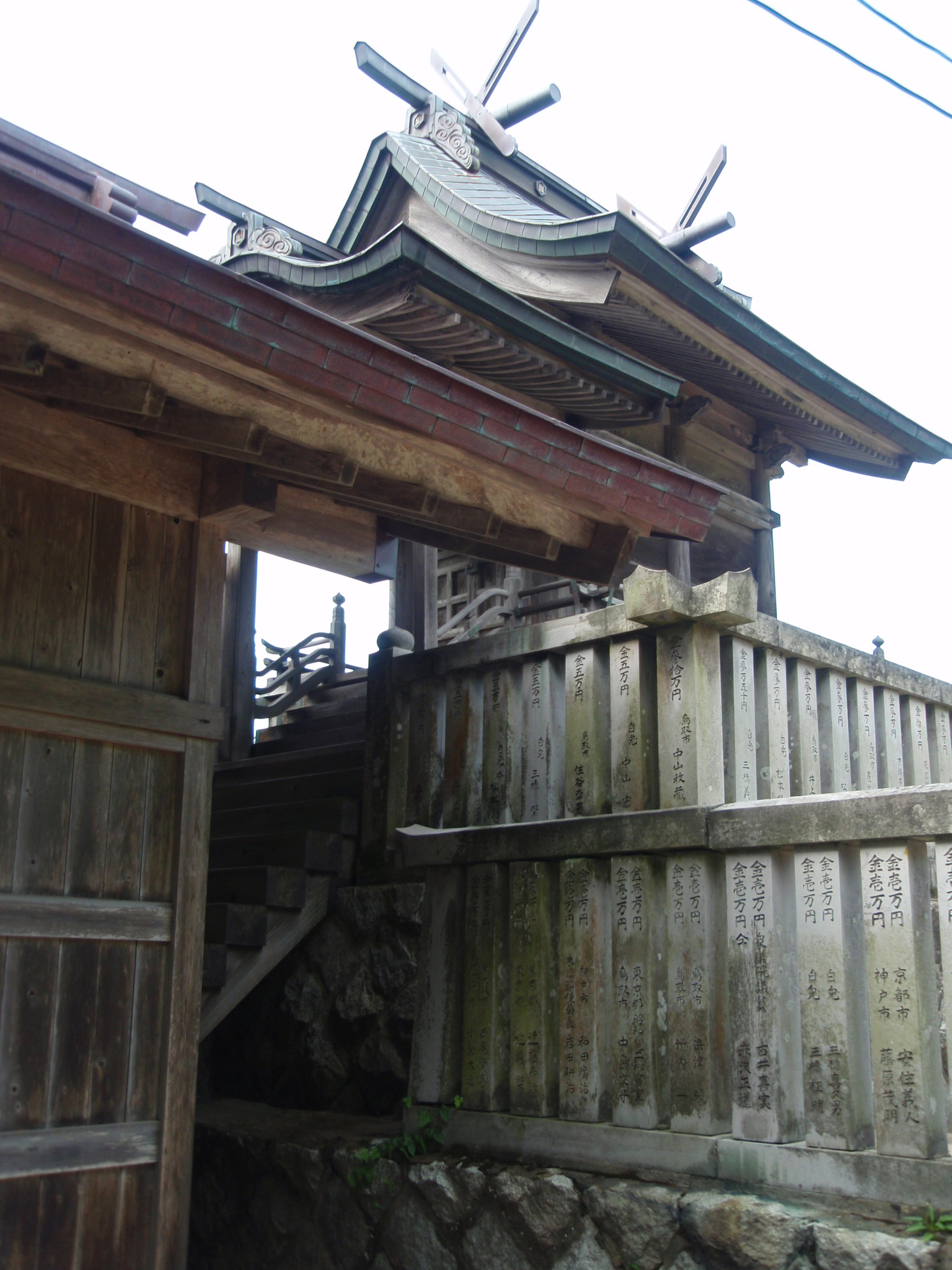
Honden main hall of the Hakuto Shrine, dedicated to the White Hare of Inaba

The White Hare of Inaba (因幡の白兎, Inaba no Shirousagi) can refer to two distinct Japanese myths, both from the ancient province of Inaba, now the eastern part of Tottori Prefecture. The White Hare of Inaba legend belongs to the Izumo denrai, or tradition of myths originating from the Izumo region. The White Hare of Inaba forms an essential part of the legend of the Shinto god Ōnamuchi-no-kami, which was the name for Ōkuninushi within this legend.

The hare referred to in the legend is the Lepus brachyurus, or Japanese hare, possibly the subspecies found on the Oki Islands known as the Lepus brachyurus okiensis. The Japanese hare ranges between 43 centimetres (17 in) and 54 centimetres (21 in) in length, and is much smaller than the common European hare. Japanese hares are typically brown, but may turn white during winter in areas with a varying climate, such as that of the Inaba region.

== Kojiki version ==
One version of the tale of the White Hare of Inaba is found in the Kojiki, the oldest extant chronicle in Japan, which dates from early in the 8th century (711-712). The legend appears in the first of the three sections of the Kojiki, the Kamitsumaki, also known as the Jindai no Maki, or "Volume of the Age of the Gods". This section of the Kojiki outlines the myths concerning the foundation of Japan prior to the birth of the Emperor Jimmu, the first Emperor of Japan.

In the Kojiki version of the myth, a hare tricks some wanizame (Note: Wanizame may refer to the wani, a dragon or sea monster in Japanese mythology. In the San'in region, from which the myth originates, wanizame is synonymous with the common shark.) into being used as a land bridge in order to travel from the Island of Oki to Cape Keta. Cape Keta is now identified with the Hakuto Coast in the present-day city of Tottori. The hare challenges the sharks to see whose clan is larger—that of the sharks, or that of the hares. The hare had the sharks lie in a row across the sea. The hare then hopped across them, counting them as he went. Nearing the end, the hare exclaims that he has deceived the sharks in order to use them as a bridge. The last shark attacks the hare, ripping his fur from him.

Ōnamuchi-no-kami (Ōkuninushi's name at that time) and his eighty brothers were traveling through the Inaba region to woo Princess Yakami of Inaba. While the brothers were on their way to visit the princess, the flayed hare stopped them and asked them for help. Rather than helping the hare, they advised it to wash in the sea and dry itself in the wind, which naturally caused it great pain. In contrast, Ōnamuchi, unlike his quarreling elder brothers, told the hare to bathe in fresh water from the mouth of a river, and then roll in the pollen of cattails. The body of the hare was restored to its original state, and after its recovery, revealed its true form as a god. In gratitude, the hare told Ōnamuchi, the lowest born in the family, that he would marry Princess Yakami.

The White Hare of Inaba legend emphasizes the benevolence of Ōnamuchi, who was later enshrined at the Izumo-taisha. Japanese scholars have traditionally interpreted the struggle between the kind Ōnamuchi and his wrathful eighty brothers as a symbolic representation of civilization and barbarism in the emergent Japanese state.

The version of the White Hare of Inaba legend told in the Kojiki has been compared to similar myths from Java in Indonesia, Sri Lanka, and India.

== Ise ga Naru version ==
Long ago, when Japanese goddess Amaterasu and her entourage traveled around at the boundary of Yakami in Inaba, they were looking for a place for their temporary palace, suddenly a white hare appeared. the white hare bit Amaterasu's clothes and took her to an appropriate place for a temporary palace along Nakayama mountain and Reiseki mountain. About two hours' walk, accompanied by the white hare, Amaterasu reached a mountain top plain, which is now called Ise ga naru. Then, the white hare disappeared at Ise ga naru.

The place of this legend is in Yazu town and Tottori city, in Tottori Prefecture (ancient Inaba and Houki), where the shrine Hakuto Jinja reveres the white hare.
