= Cap LeMoine, Nova Scotia =

Community in Nova Scotia, Canada

Coordinates: 46°30′4.85″N 61°4′26.5″W

Cap LeMoine in Nova Scotia

Cap LeMoine (Scottish Gaelic: Bràigh na h-Aibhneadh; also referred to as Cap Le Moine or Cap Le Moyne) is a small community in the Canadian province of Nova Scotia, located in Inverness County on Cape Breton Island. One of the early settlers in the area was Isadore Chiasson, who was licensed to live there in 1796.

Cap LeMoine was home to Joe's Scarecrow Village before it ceased operations in 2011.
