= Ting mong =

Human-like decoy or mannequin placed in front of houses in Cambodia

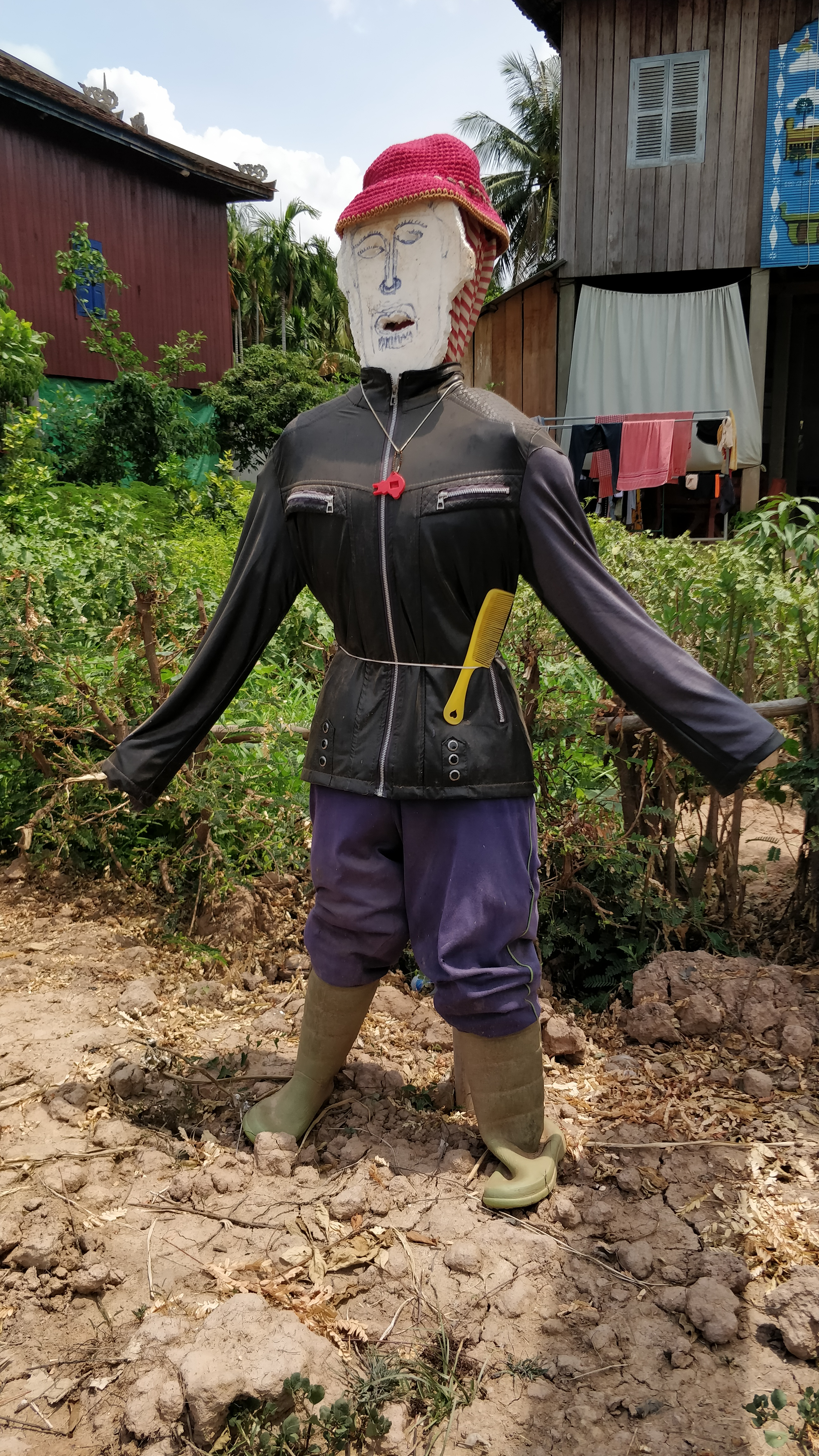
A ting mong in 2020, during the COVID-19 pandemic in Cambodia

Ting mong (Khmer: ទីងមោង) is a decoy or mannequin popular in Khmer folklore, traditionally with a head and no body, but more recently in the shape of a human, similar in its shape to the scarecrow, but different in its function as its purpose is not to scare crows but to fight away evil spirits and plagues.

== Origin ==
According the Khmer ethnologist Ang Choulean, the Khmer scarecrow can be traced back to the guardian deities in the Angkorian temples. Those with a scary face and no body, can be traced back to the figure of Rahu, while others recall giants and demons of Khmer mythology.

== Design ==
Ting mong have varying designs in the different provinces of Cambodia. They are often made of an old pot of broken clay painted with charcoal to make a scary face. They are hung on the outer fence of private houses, especially near the entrance.

In the Province of Siemreap, ting mong are often weapon-bearing scarecrows.

Since the 1990s, the design of the ting mong has evolved as villagers decorated the entrance of the village or their houses with humanoid scarecrows using second-hand clothes which were cheaper and more accessible in bulk than in the past. While the original idea was to scare the ghosts away, ghost scarers now tend to look more like human beings who emit a certain sense of humor.

In the present day, superstitious farmers erect ting tong as floral-shirted scarecrows with a plastic pot for a head and armed with a stick.

== Function ==
The original function of the ting mong was to chase away the evil spirits.

After the fall of the brutal Khmer Rouge regime in 1979. according to the recollections of older Cambodians, people made effigies of Khmer Rouge soldiers, trapping their spirits inside scarecrows that were then burned in mass bonfires. In alternative tellings of this story, a disease spread throughout the provinces that year, associated with the dead cadres, and scarecrows were erected to banish it.

The rocambolesque apparel with which they have been geared with since the 1990s has suggested a more humoristic function. Since 2020, ting mong have gained in popularity as they helped to soothe the fear linked to the pandemic of coronavirus.

== See also ==
- Scarecrow
- Kuebiko, a scarecrow from Japanese folklore who cannot walk but has comprehensive awareness.
