= Kuebiko =

Shinto wisdom deity taking the form of a scarecrow

- God of wisdom
- Member of the Kami
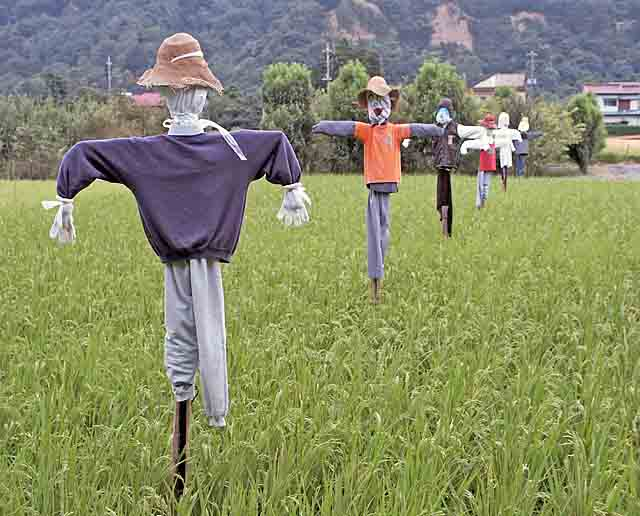
- A grouping of Japanese scarecrows similar to Kuebiko
- Other names: Yamada no sohodo

Kuebiko (久延毘古) is the Shinto kami ("god; deity") of folk wisdom, knowledge and agriculture, and is represented in Japanese mythology as a scarecrow who cannot walk but has comprehensive awareness.

== Names ==
Kuebiko is the main name for this kami. There is also an alternate name of Yamada no sohodo (山田之曾富騰), mentioned in the Kojiki.

- Kuebiko comes from kueru (崩える), an archaic verb meaning "to break down; to become shabby and disordered", plus hiko (彦), an old epithet for "boy, young man", in turn from hi ko (日子), literally "sun child". The meaning could be translated as something like "shabby young man".
- Yamada no sohodo is formed like an old-fashioned formal name, from surname or literal noun Yamada (山田, lit. 'mountain + paddy'), genitive or possessive particle no (の), and sohodo (案山子), in turn from soho ("sopping wet") + -do, a contraction from -bito, the compounding form of hito (人). The meaning of this name could be construed as "soaked person of the mountain paddies", a euphemism for "scarecrow".

== Mythology ==
The (c. 712) Kojiki ("Record of Ancient Matters") has the earliest reference to Kuebiko in the myth of Ōkuninushi ("Great Land Master"). When Ōkuninushi was at Cape Miho in Izumo, a small kami arrived in a boat. Nobody knew his name, but a toad suggested asking Kuebiko, who revealed the god was a scion of the goddess Kami-musubi (神産巣日) named Sukuna-bikona (少彦名神). In Basil Hall Chamberlain's translation,

Then the toad spoke, saying: "As for this, the Crumbling Prince will surely know it." Thereupon [the Deity Master-of-the-Great-Land] summoned and asked the Crumbling-Prince, who replied, saying: "This is the Little-Prince-the-Renowned-Deity, the august child of the Deity-Producing-Wondrous-Deity." ... So [the Deity here] called the Crumbling Prince, who revealed the Little-Prince-the-Renowned-Deity, is what is now [called] the scarecrow in the mountain fields. This Deity, though his legs do not walk, is a Deity who knows everything in the Empire.

== Modern worship ==
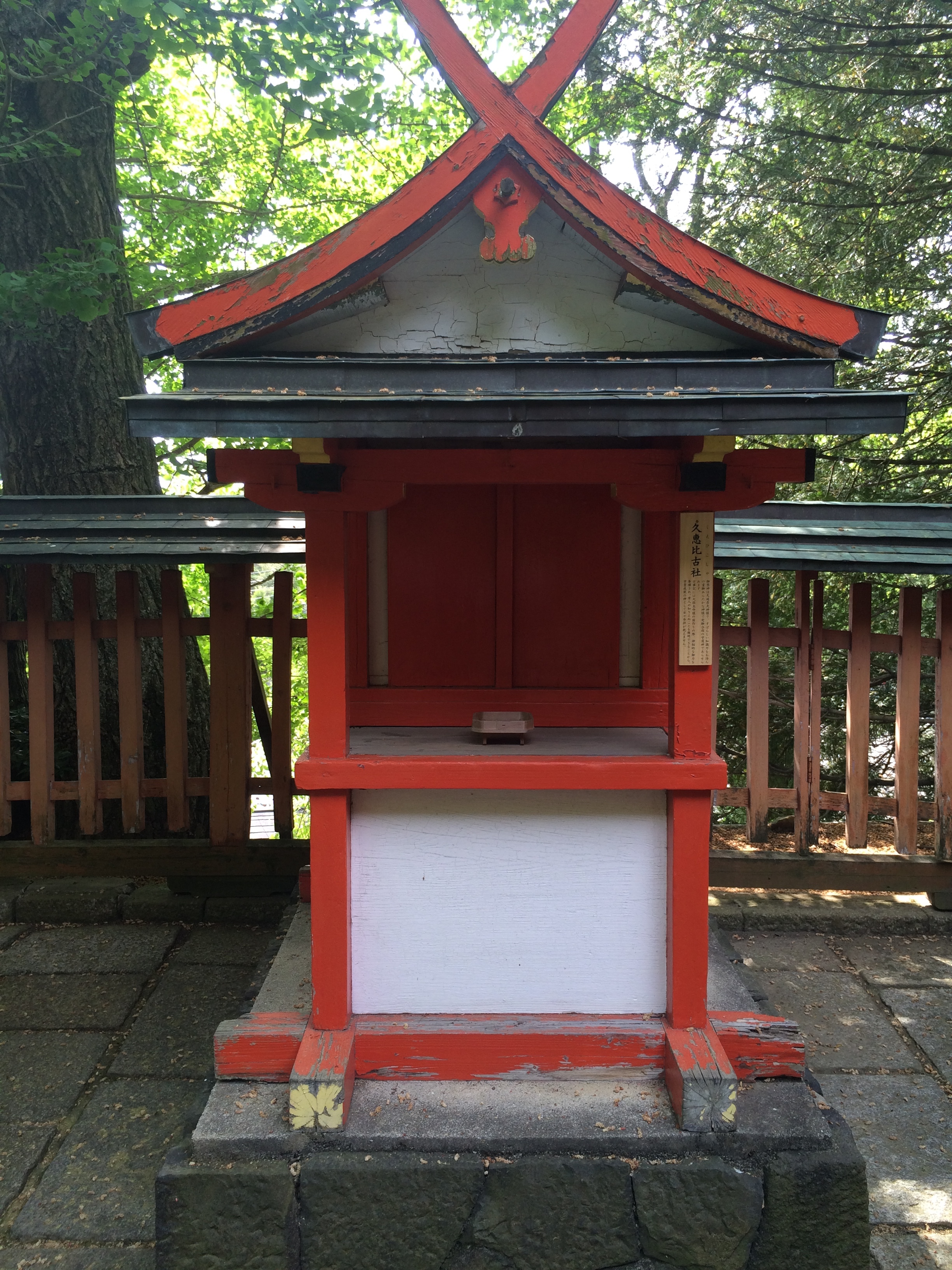
A shrine dedicated to Kuebiko

In the present day, Kuebiko is worshipped as the god of agriculture or scholarship and wisdom. The Kuebiko Shrine (Kuebiko jinja 久延彦神社), which is a subordinate shrine (massha) of Ōmiwa Shrine in Sakurai, Nara, is dedicated to this deity.

== See also ==
- Ting mong, a Cambodian scarecrow used against spirits and plagues
