= Joe's Scarecrow Village =

Canadian roadside attraction

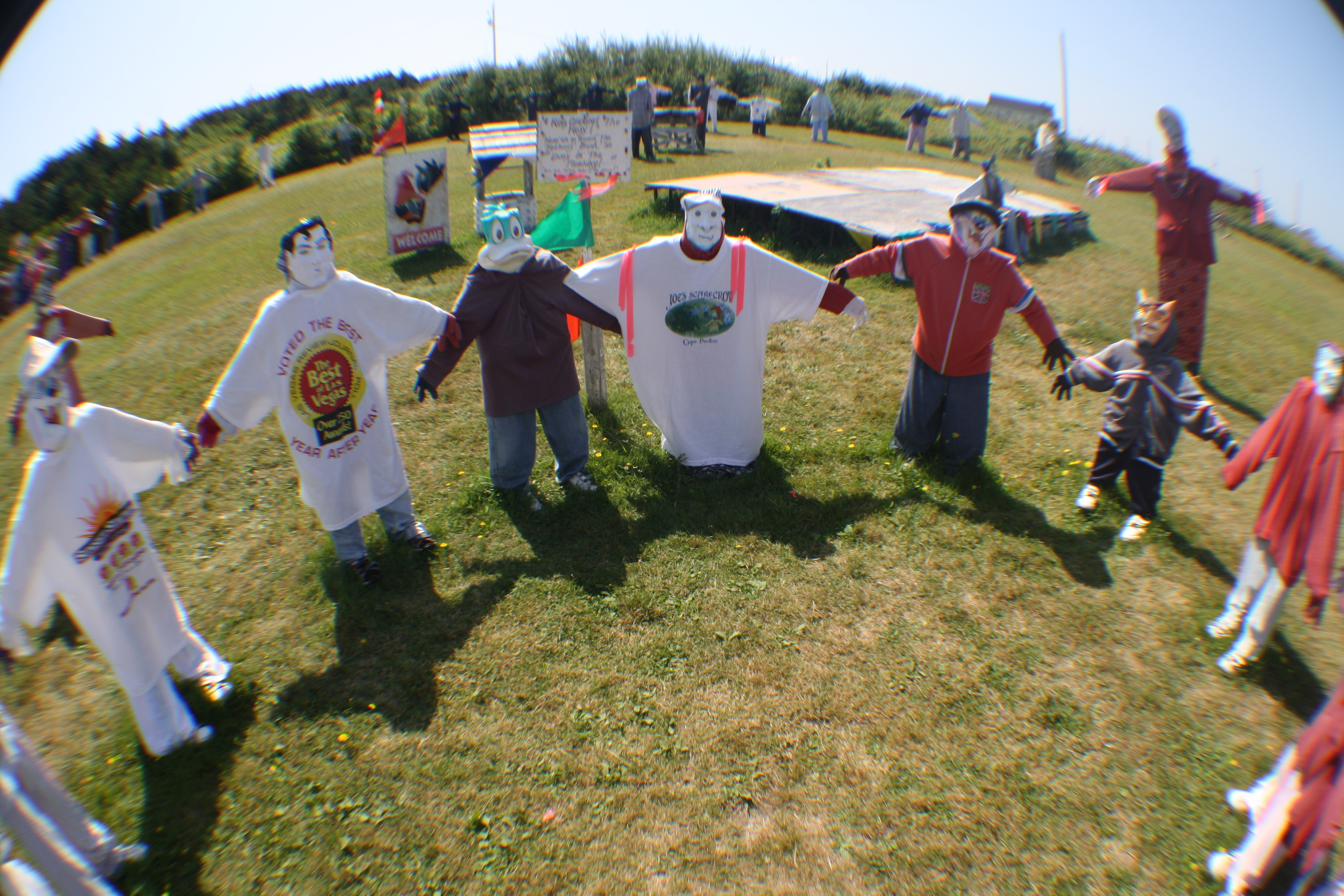
- Scarecrow children in a circle
- Interactive map of Joe's Scarecrow Village
- Location: 11877 Cabot Trail, Cap LeMoine, Cape Breton, Nova Scotia
- Coordinates: 46.49592°N 61.07427°W
- Opened: 1984
- Closed: 2011
- Owner: Chester Delaney
- Theme: Scarecrows
- Operating season: Late spring to early fall
- Free admission (donations accepted)

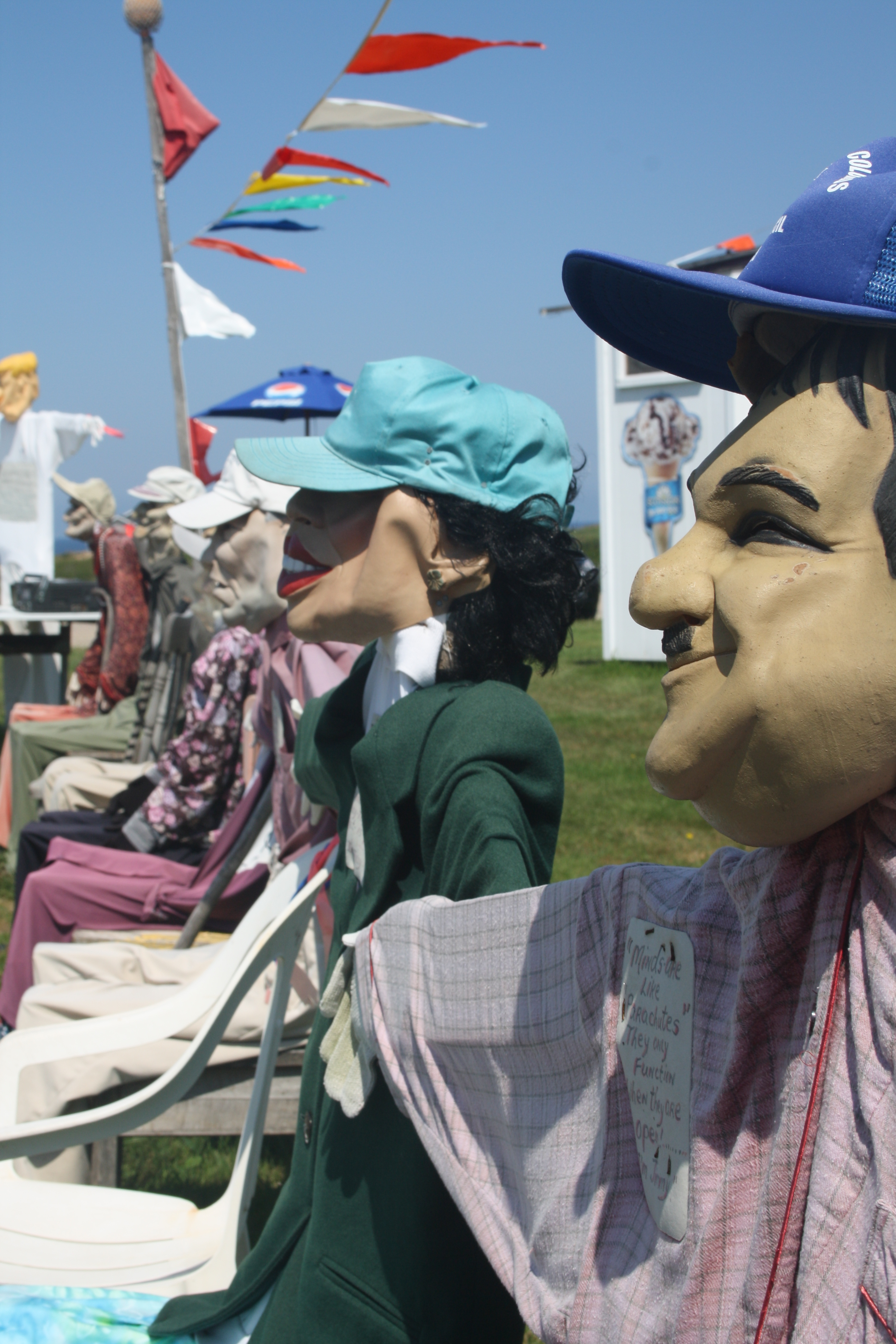
Scarecrows sitting in a row

Joe's Scarecrow Village, also known simply as Joe's Scarecrows, was a roadside attraction located in Cap LeMoine near Chéticamp in Nova Scotia. The village was founded in 1984 by Joe Delaney and later run by his son Chester Delaney before closing in 2011.

== Description ==
Joe's Scarecrow Village was a collection of scarecrows located in a field beside the Cabot Trail, a Cape Breton highway with a high volume of tourists. The scarecrows were dressed in a variety of costumes, including those of fisherman, a wedding party, school children, celebrities, and politicians. Joe Delaney, the attraction's creator, described the costumes as being similar to those traditionally worn by local Acadians for mi-carême festivities. The scarecrows were labelled with names and descriptions, with some of the scarecrows being memorials to local people. The Village featured a souvenir shop and snack bar. The attraction did not charge admission but accepted donations for the ongoing maintenance of the project. As a novel tourist site, Delaney was given an innovation award by the Cape Breton Tourist Association, and an honor roll award by the Tourist Industry Association of Nova Scotia.

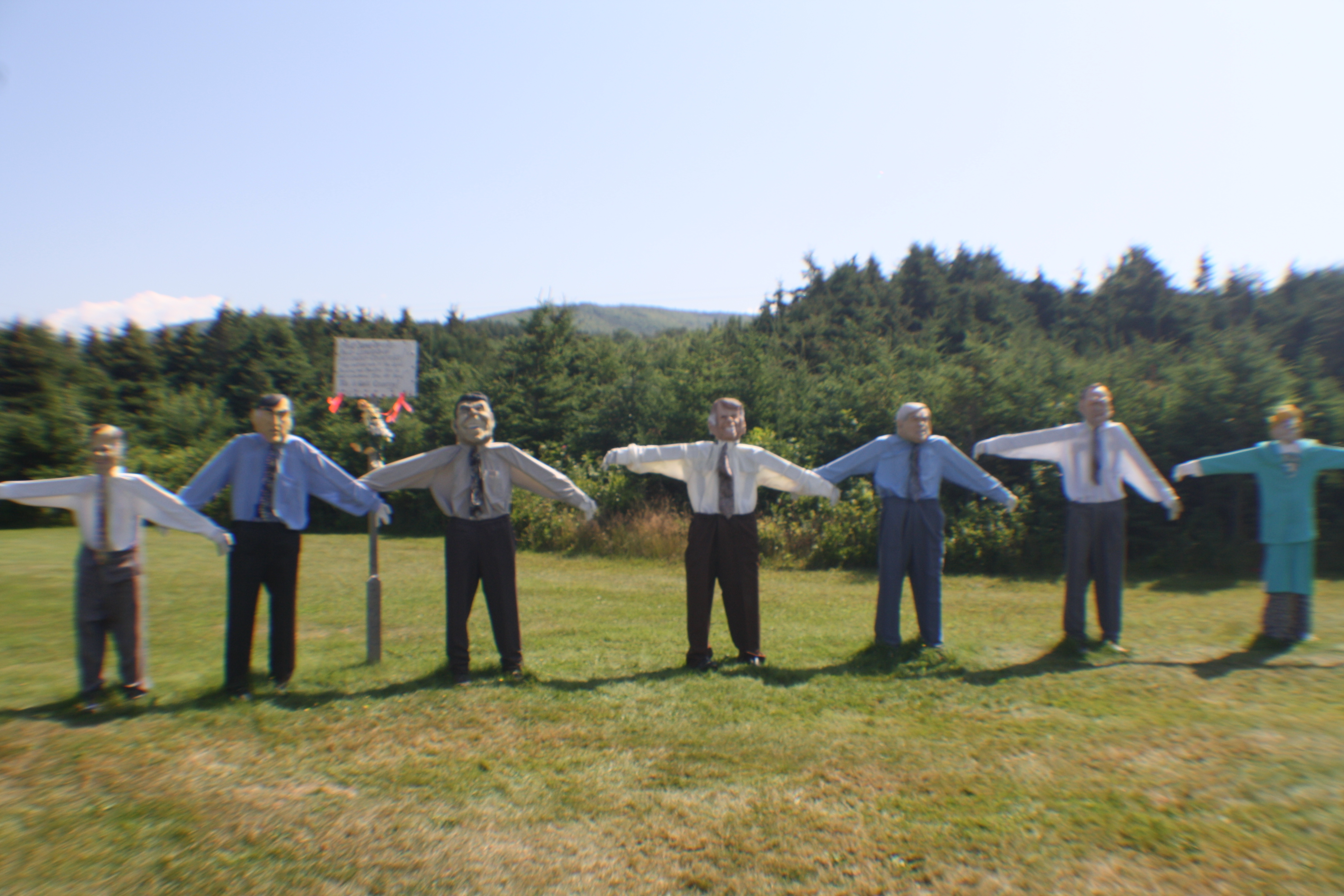
Politicians in scarecrow form

== Origins ==
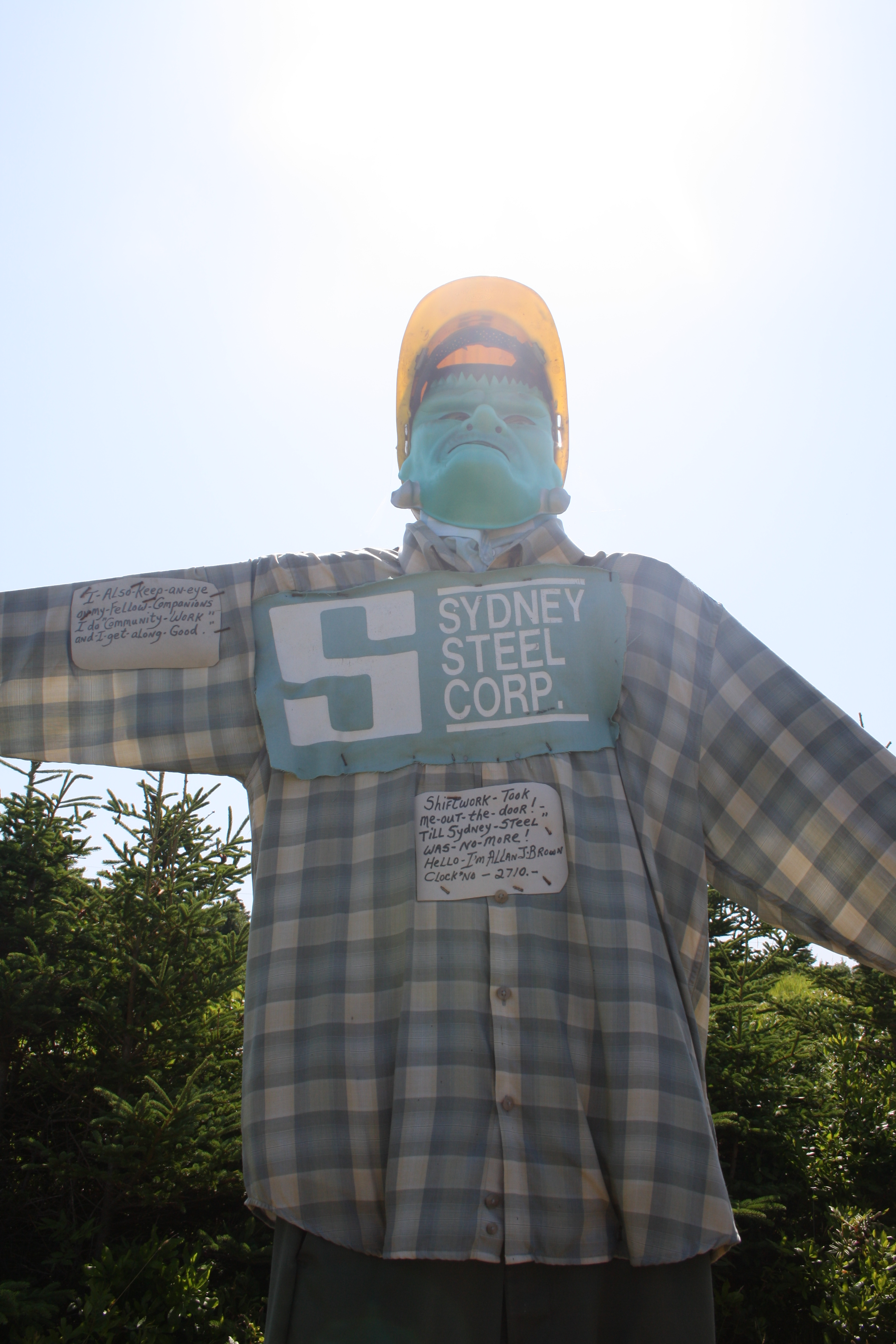
A scarecrow representing a Sydney Steel Corporation worker

Joe's Scarecrow Village was started by Joe Delaney, a retired school janitor who planted a vegetable garden on his property in 1984. Delaney and his sons built three scarecrows intended to keep wild animals out of the vegetable garden. They set up the scarecrows in the garden at night, and the following morning found a charter bus and several cars parked on the side of the road. In all, there were more than 50 people in the field looking at the scarecrows and taking photos. According to Delaney, a woman from California said to him, "Joe, for the love of God, never mind your garden. Put up more scarecrows. That's what we want to see. If you can make those three, you can make more. And that's what people want to see. Instead of these gift shops and museums and all that." This inspired Delaney to begin creating more scarecrows. In 1984, Delaney had created a total of 12 scarecrows; by 1985 this number grew to around 30, and by 1986 there were 46 scarecrows. In 1986 Joe's Scarecrows had approximately 18,000 visitors from around the world. By 1989, it had attracted over 27,000 visitors. At that time, Delaney referred to his Scarecrow Village as "Joe's Drive-in Theatre of Scarecrows."

== 1986 Massacre ==
At the end of the 1986 season on the eve of Armistice Day, Joe's Scarecrow Village was vandalized in what Delaney called the 1986 Massacre. 45 of the 46 scarecrows were destroyed—broken and cut apart. Delaney named the only remaining scarecrow "Rory" and dubbed him the lone survivor of the massacre. Delaney wrote an article, in the voice of Rory asking people to help repair the scarecrow village. The article was published in a local newspaper and Delaney received an outpouring of support including donations of old clothing and financial contributions. A teacher in British Columbia put on a play about Joe's Scarecrows to raise money for the restoration. The following season Delaney rebuilt the scarecrow village, which grew to over 100 scarecrows.

== In popular culture ==
Joe's Scarecrows was featured on episode 1 of the ITV program Billy Connolly: Journey to the Edge of the World in which Billy Connolly plays the banjo with the scarecrows and is surprised by a scarecrow made in his likeness. The attraction was also profiled in Bill Richardson's Scorned and Beloved: Dead of Winter Meetings with Canadian Eccentrics (1997) ISBN 0-676-97079-6. The 1994 documentary Lawn and Order also featured Joe's Scarecrows.
