= Garden owl =

Pest control decoy

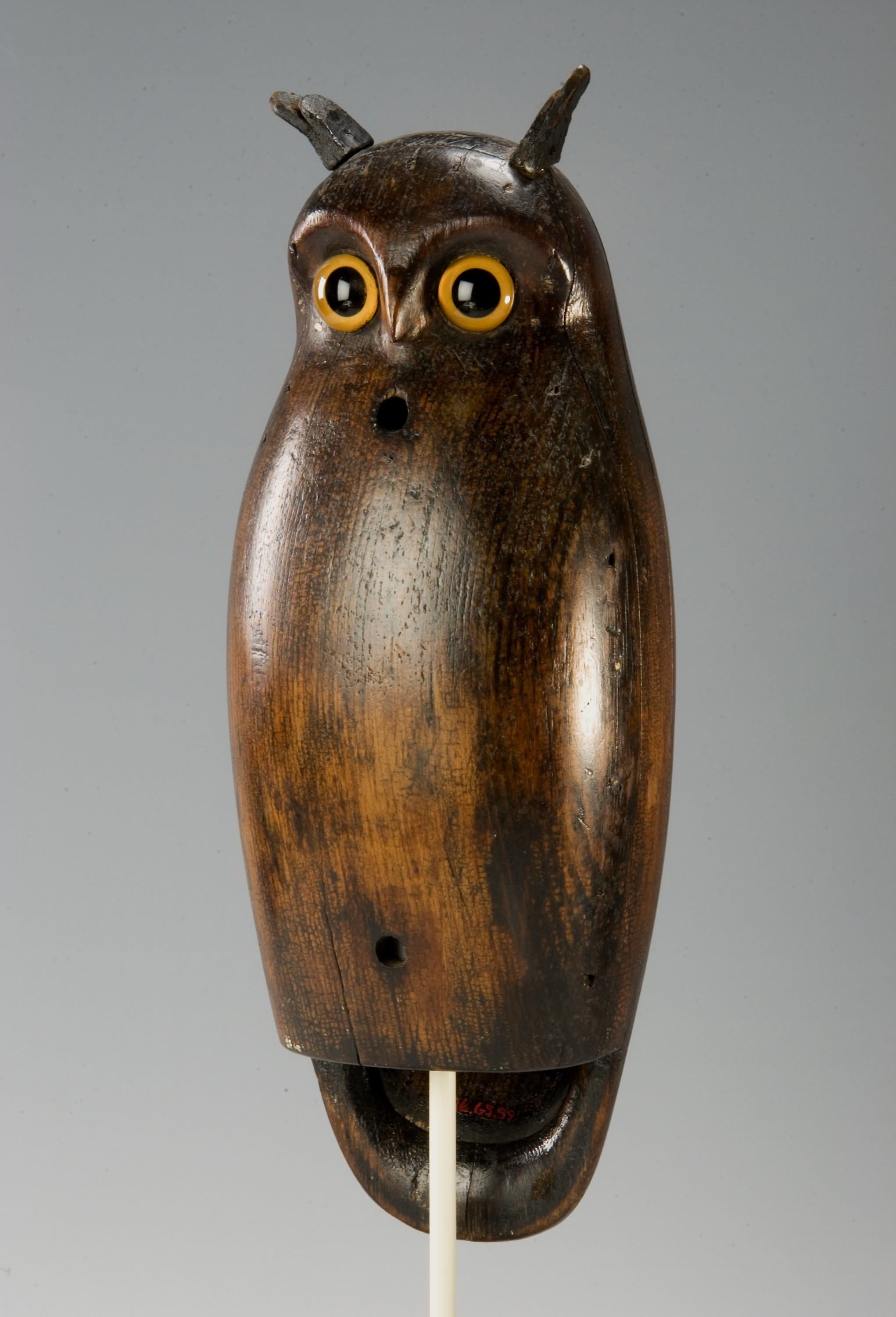
A carved wooden decoy owl from the early 20th century, with glass eyes

A garden owl is a scarecrow resembling a horned owl, commonly employed as a method to deter the presence of pests, particularly birds or rodents, in agricultural and urban environments.

== Manufacture and design ==
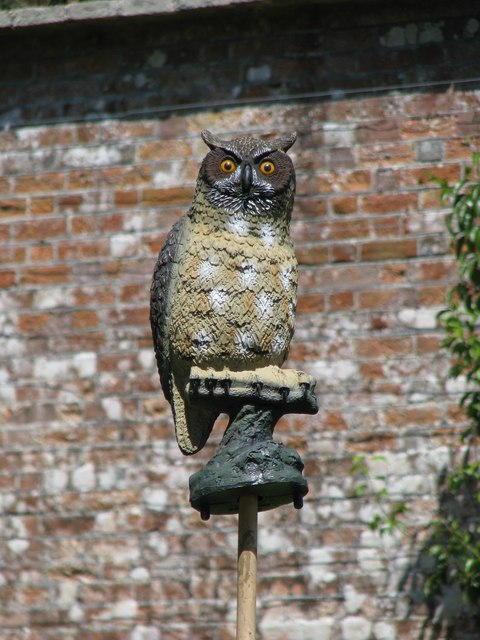
A plastic decoy owl

Modern garden owls are commonly constructed from plastic blow molds. There are many manufactures of garden owls. A swiveling head and wind-powered wings are features that are often used to mimic a living owls behavior, and increase the garden owl's ability to deter pests. Many technological updates to the garden owl have been made including solar motors, motion sensors, and hidden cameras.

== Effectiveness ==
The presence of a garden owl may temporarily mitigate pests, but will gradually lose its effectiveness with time. Moving the decoy, adding a sound element, or surrounding the decoy with reflective materials are methods known to increase the longevity of the garden owl's effectiveness.

== History ==
Hunting decoys are the early predecessors of garden owls. Both Native Americans and Europeans used bird decoys in strategic hunting practices. European records show efforts to reducing bird damage to crops though usage of decoys dating back to the 1400s. Books on pest control that mention using decoys were written in the 1600s. American owl decoys date back to the 1900's and were made of materials such as balsa wood, papier-mâché, and leather.
