= Scarecrow =

Human-like decoy or mannequin placed in fields

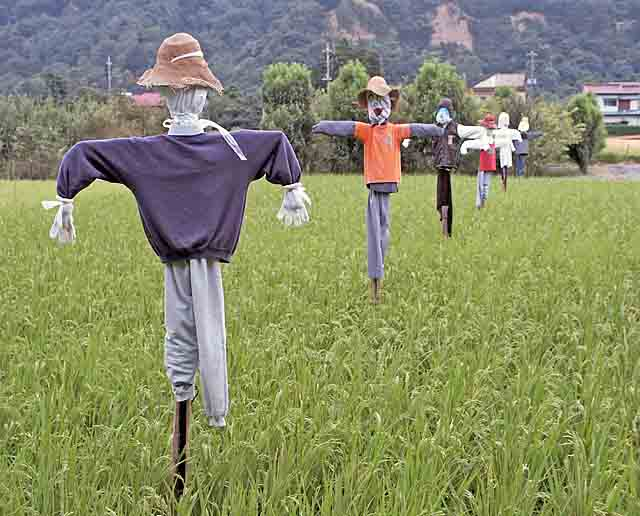
Scarecrows in a rice paddy in Japan

A scarecrow is a decoy or mannequin that is often in the shape of a human. Scarecrows are usually dressed in old clothes and placed in open fields to discourage birds from disturbing and feeding on recently cast seed and growing crops. Scarecrows are used around the world by farmers, and are a notable symbol of farms and the countryside in popular culture.

== Design ==
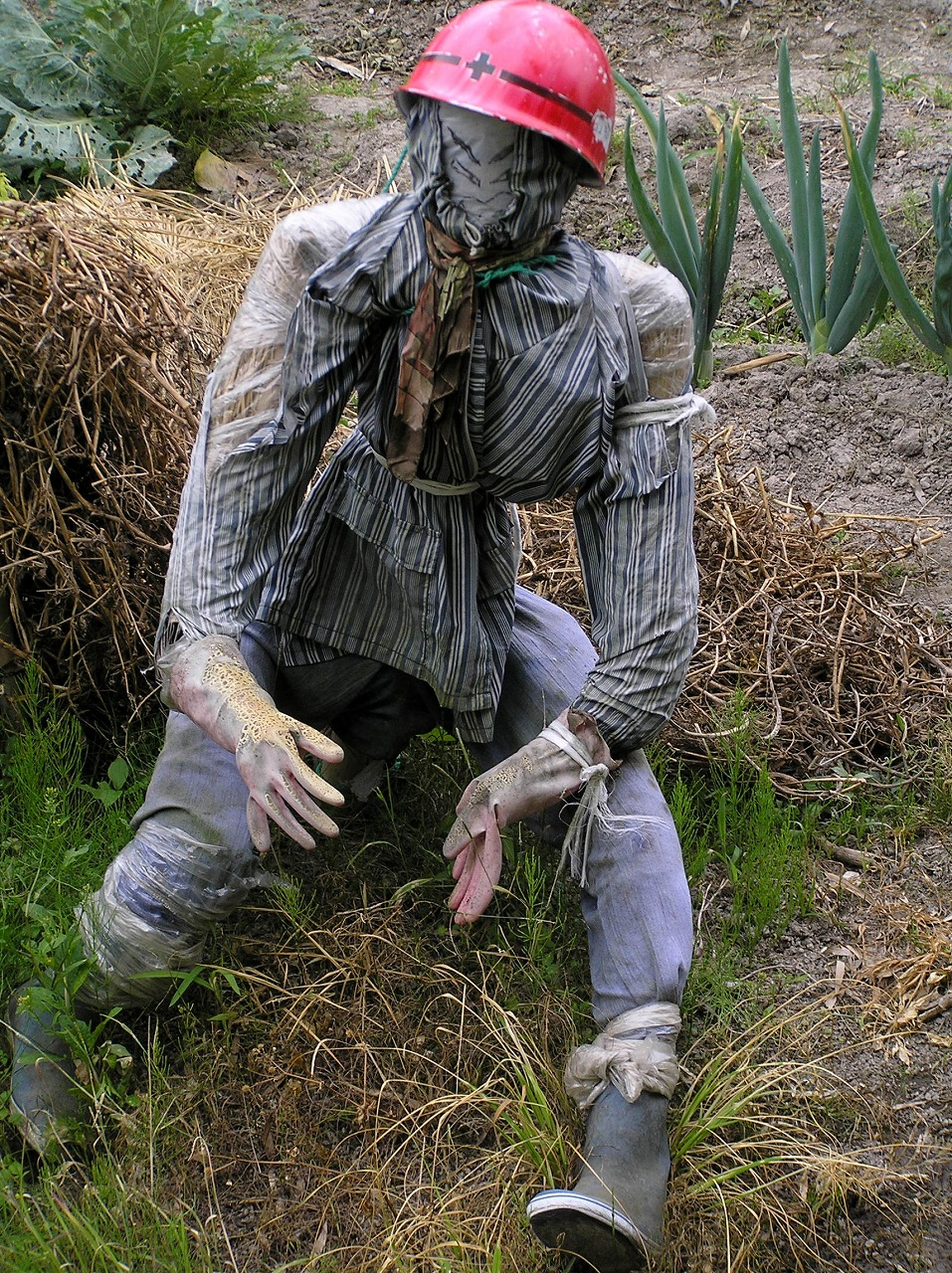
A scarecrow wearing a helmet (Japan)

The common form of a scarecrow is a humanoid figure dressed in old clothes and placed in open fields to discourage birds such as crows or sparrows from disturbing and feeding on recently cast seed and growing crops. Machinery such as windmills have been employed as scarecrows, but the effectiveness lessens as animals become familiar with the structures.

Since the invention of the scarecrow, more effective methods have been developed. On California farmland, highly-reflective aluminized PET film ribbons are tied to the plants to produce shimmers from the sun. Another approach is using automatic noise guns powered by propane gas. One winery in New York has even used inflatable tube men or airdancers to scare away birds.

== Other names ==
- In the United Kingdom, where there are a number of different languages and dialects, there are a wide range of alternative names such as:
  - hay-man in England
  - tattie bogle or bodach-rocais (lit. 'old man of the rooks') in Scotland
  - bwbach in Wales
  - hodmedod in Berkshire
  - murmet in Devon
  - gallybagger on the Isle of Wight
  - tattie bogal on the Isle of Skye
  - mommet in Somerset
  - mawkin in Sussex

== In popular culture ==
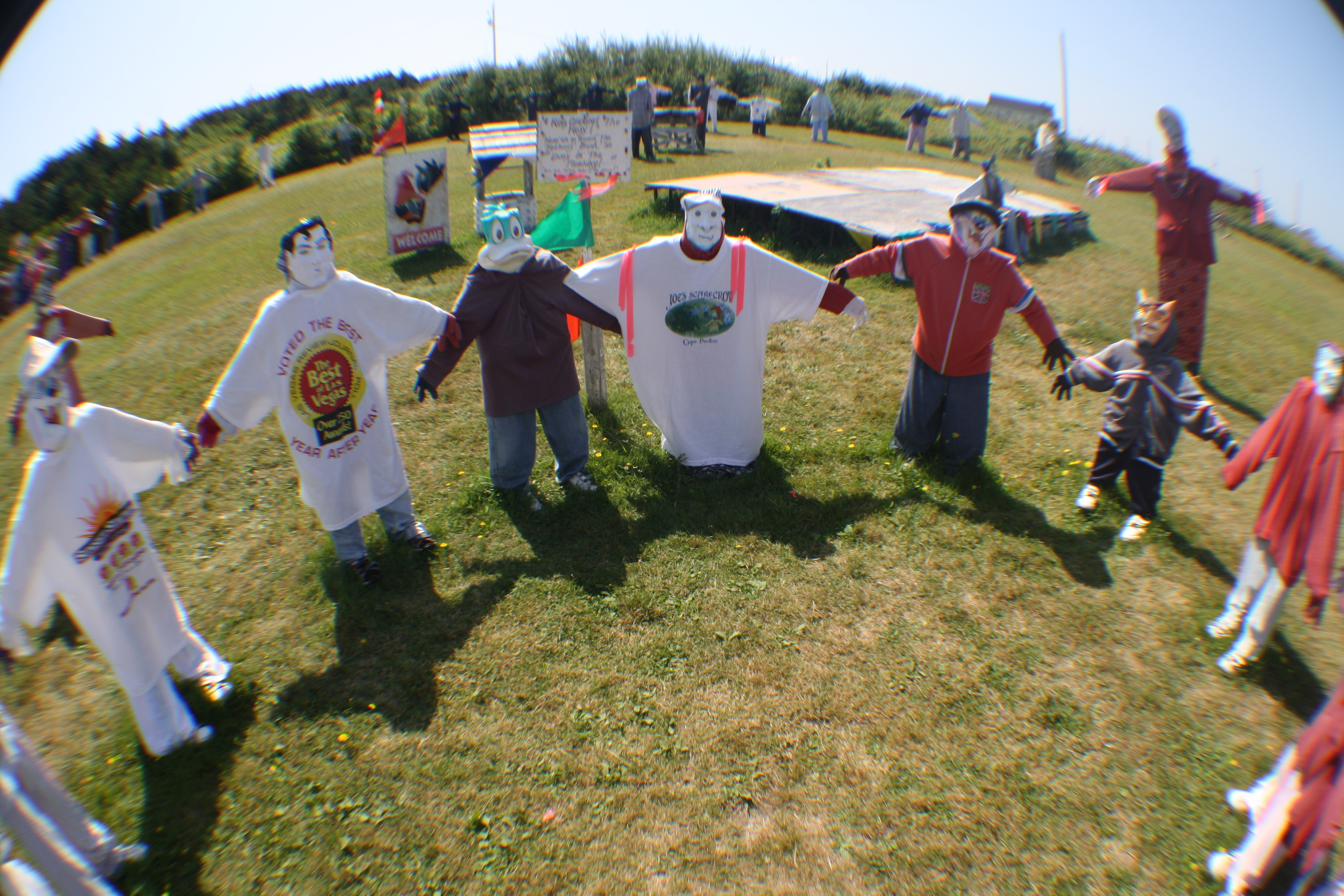
Circle of scarecrow children at Joe's Scarecrow Village

- Joe's Scarecrow Village in Cape Breton, Canada, was a roadside attraction displaying dozens of scarecrows.
- The Japanese village of Nagoro, on the island of Shikoku in the Tokushima Prefecture, has 35 inhabitants but more than 350 scarecrows.
- The Scarecrow is a character in the fictional Land of Oz created by American author L. Frank Baum. One of its best known representations is in the 1939 MGM film The Wizard of Oz, where the character was played by Ray Bolger.
- A supervillain named Scarecrow is part of the Rogues Gallery of the DC hero Batman. A different supervillain with the same name is part of the Marvel Universe.
- Spud the Scarecrow is a major character in the British preschool animated series Bob the Builder.
- Scarecrow character Worzel Gummidge first appeared on British radio in 1935 and has subsequently been the central character in several British children's books and television programmes.

=== Festivals ===
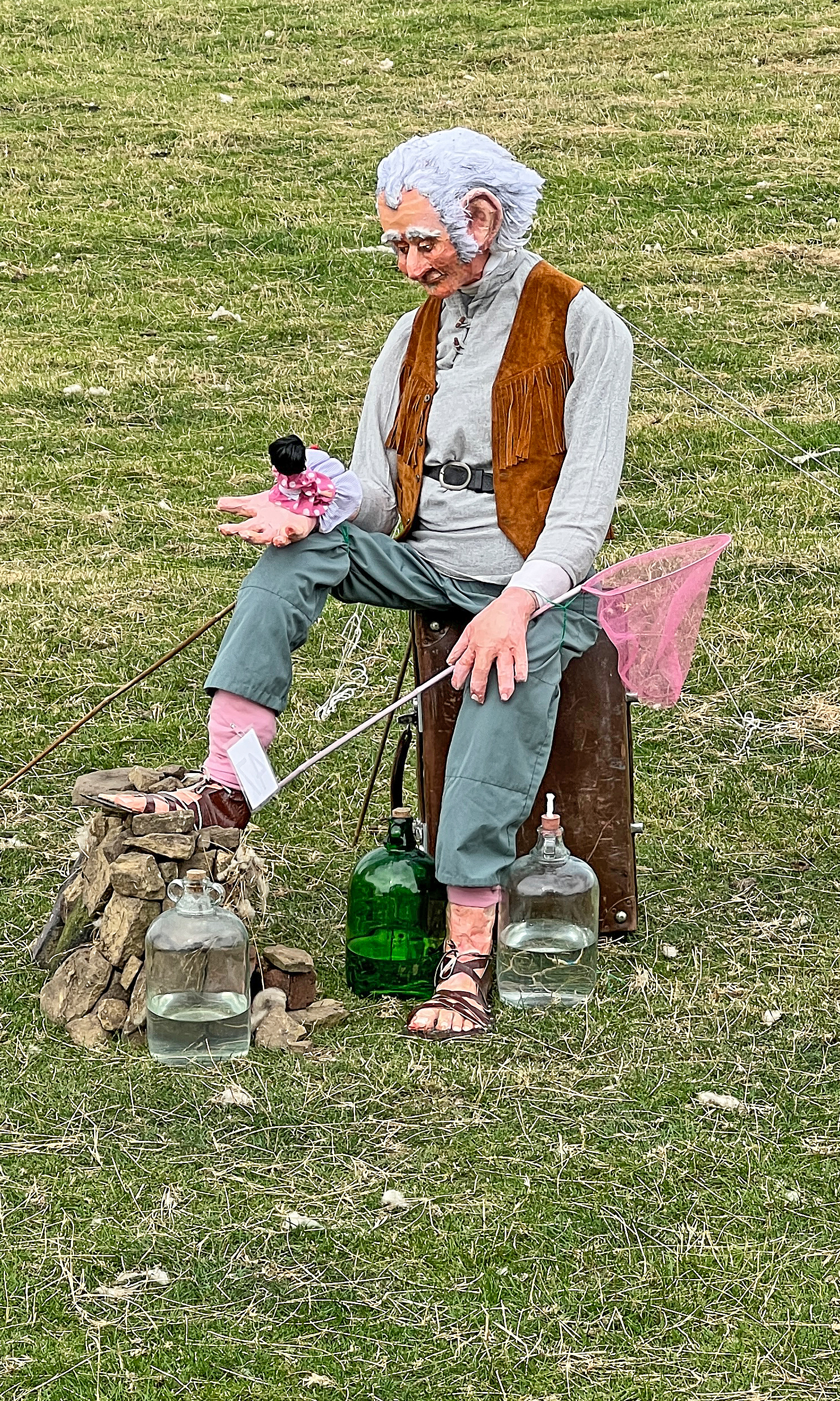
Scarecrow of The BFG at Norland Scarecrow Festival, West Yorkshire, England

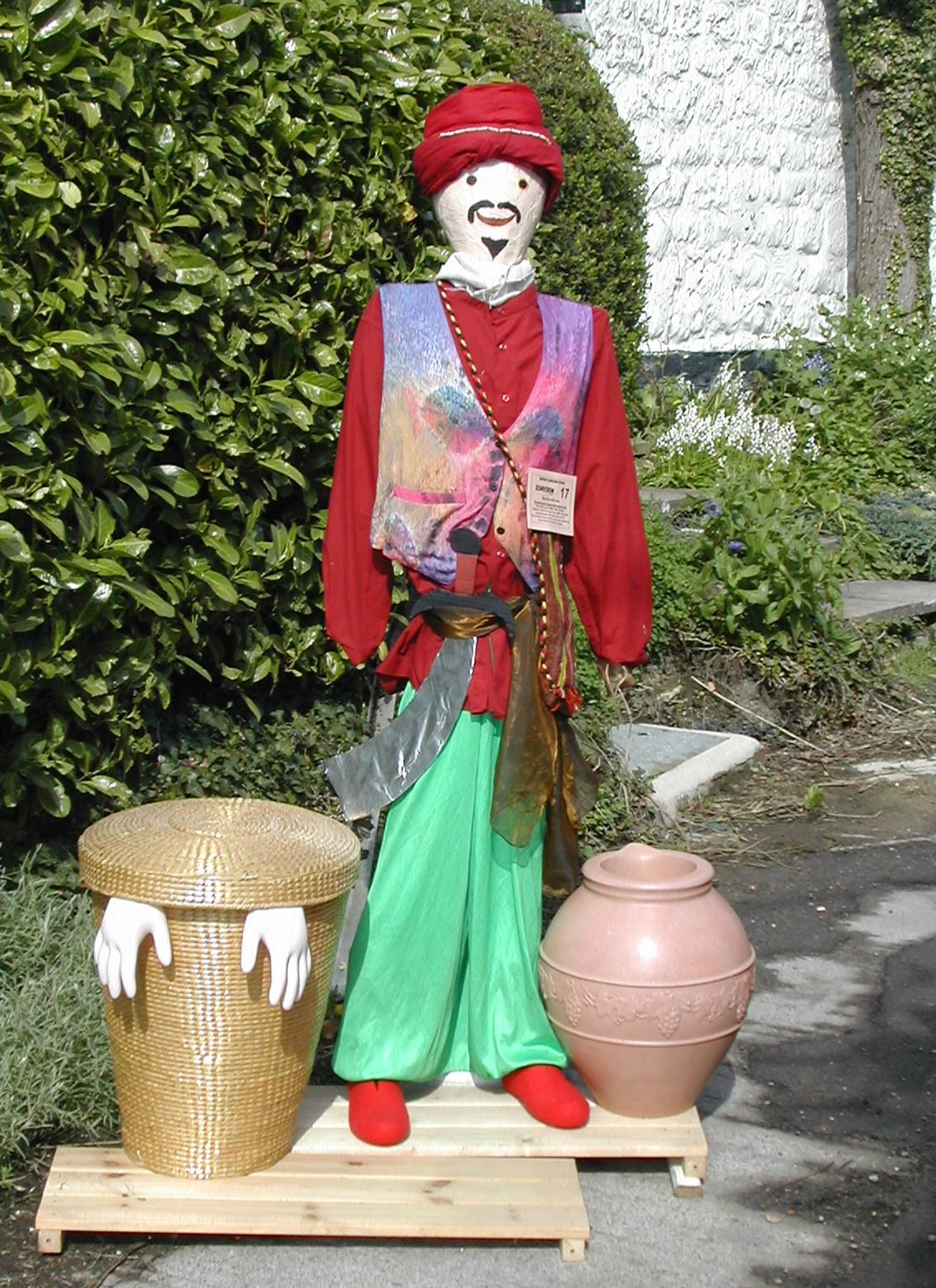
Urchfont Scarecrow Festival, Ali Baba

- In England, the Urchfont Scarecrow Festival was established in the 1990s and has become a major local event, attracting up to 10,000 people annually for the May Day Bank Holiday. Originally based on an idea imported from Derbyshire, or Kettlewell, North Yorkshire, it was the first Scarecrow Festival to be established in the whole of southern England.
- Belbroughton, north Worcestershire, holds an annual Scarecrow Weekend on the last weekend of each September since 1996, which raises money for local charities. The village of Meerbrook in Staffordshire holds an annual Scarecrow Festival during the month of May. Tetford and Salmonby, Lincolnshire, jointly host one.
- The festival at Wray, Lancashire, was established in the early 1990s and continues to the present day. In the village of Orton, Eden, Cumbria scarecrows are displayed each year, often using topical themes such as a Dalek exterminating a Wind turbine to represent local opposition to a wind farm.
- The village of Blackrod, near Bolton in Greater Manchester, holds a popular annual Scarecrow Festival over a weekend usually in early July.
- Norland, West Yorkshire, has a Scarecrow festival. Kettlewell in North Yorkshire has held an annual festival since 1994. The villages of Cotherstone, Staindrop, and Middleton-in-Teesdale in County Durham have annual scarecrow festivals.
- Scotland's first scarecrow festival was held in West Kilbride, North Ayrshire, in 2004, and there is also one held in Montrose. On the Isle of Skye, the Tattie bogal event is held each year, featuring a scarecrow trail and other events. Tonbridge in Kent also host an annual Scarecrow Trail, organised by the local Rotary Club to raise money for local charities. Gisburn, Lancashire, held its first Scarecrow Festival in June 2014.
- Mullion, in Cornwall, has an annual scarecrow festival since 2007.
- In the US, St. Charles, Illinois, hosts an annual Scarecrow Festival. Peddler's Village in Bucks County, Pennsylvania, hosts an annual scarecrow festival and presents a scarecrow display in September–October that draws tens of thousands of visitors.
- The "pumpkin people" come in the autumn months in the valley region of Nova Scotia, Canada. They are scarecrows with pumpkin heads applied to them doing various things such as playing the fiddle or riding a wooden horse. Hickling, in the south of Nottinghamshire, is another village that celebrates an annual scarecrow event. It is very popular and has successfully raised a great deal of money for charity. Meaford, Ontario, has celebrated the Scarecrow Invasion since 1996.
- In the Philippines in 2015, the Province of Isabela started a scarecrow festival named after the local language: the Bambanti Festival. The province invites all its cities and towns to participate for the festivities, which last a week; it has drawn tourists from around the island of Luzon.
- The largest gathering of scarecrows in one location is 3,812 and was achieved by National Forest Adventure Farm in Burton-upon-Trent, Staffordshire, UK, on 7 August 2014.

== Gallery ==
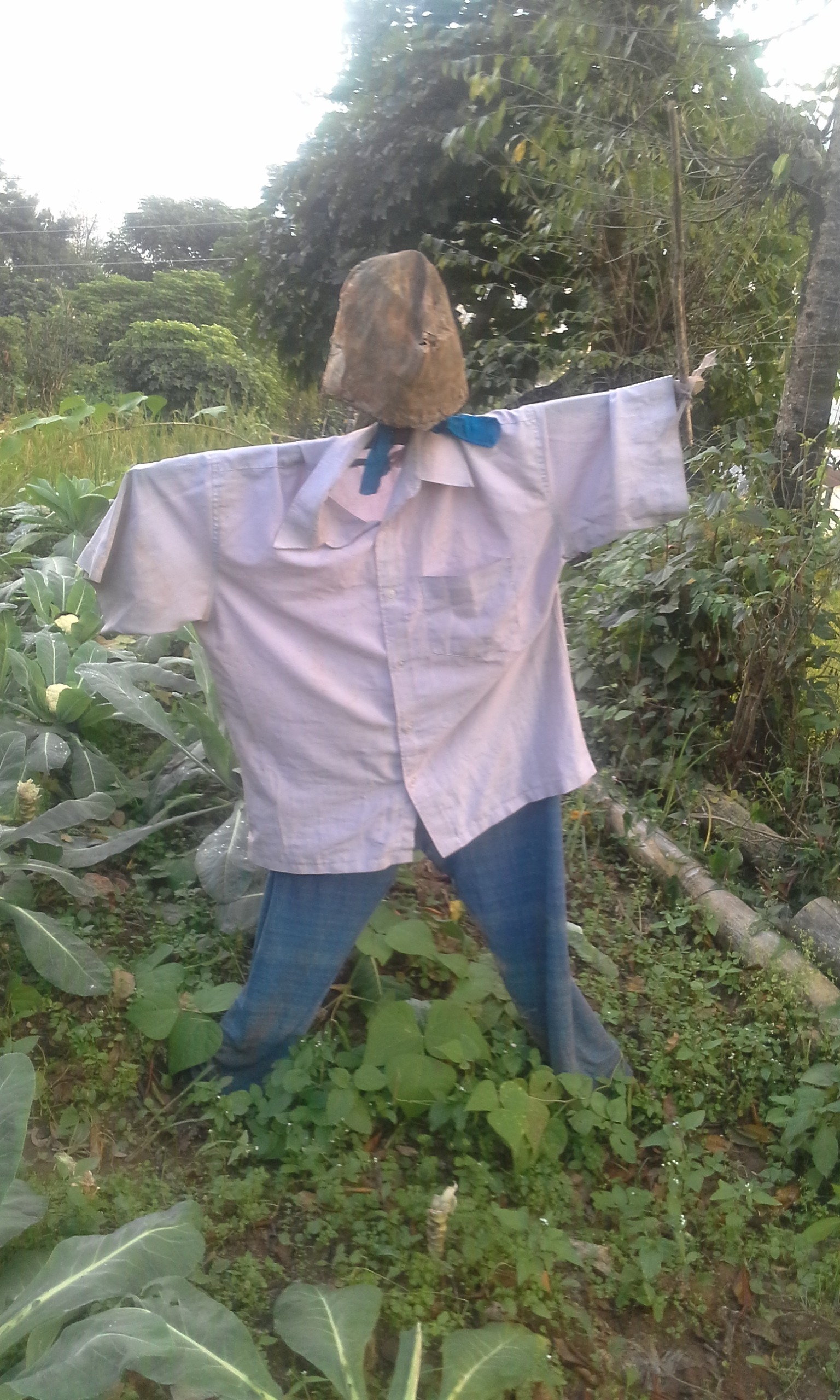
A scarecrow known as "Bungkhyachaa" in Nepali in a cauliflower field in Nepal

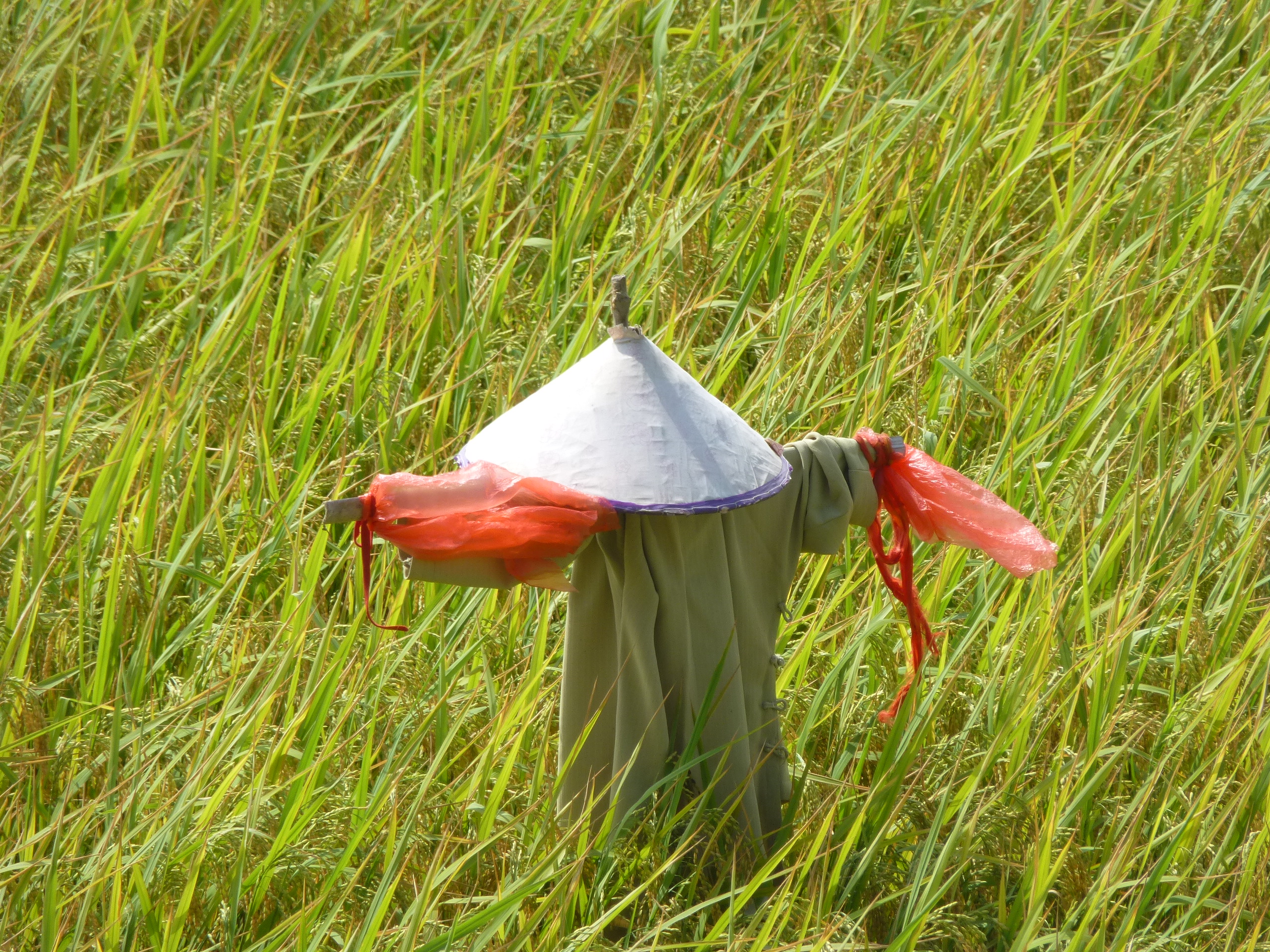
Scarecrow near Hui'an, China

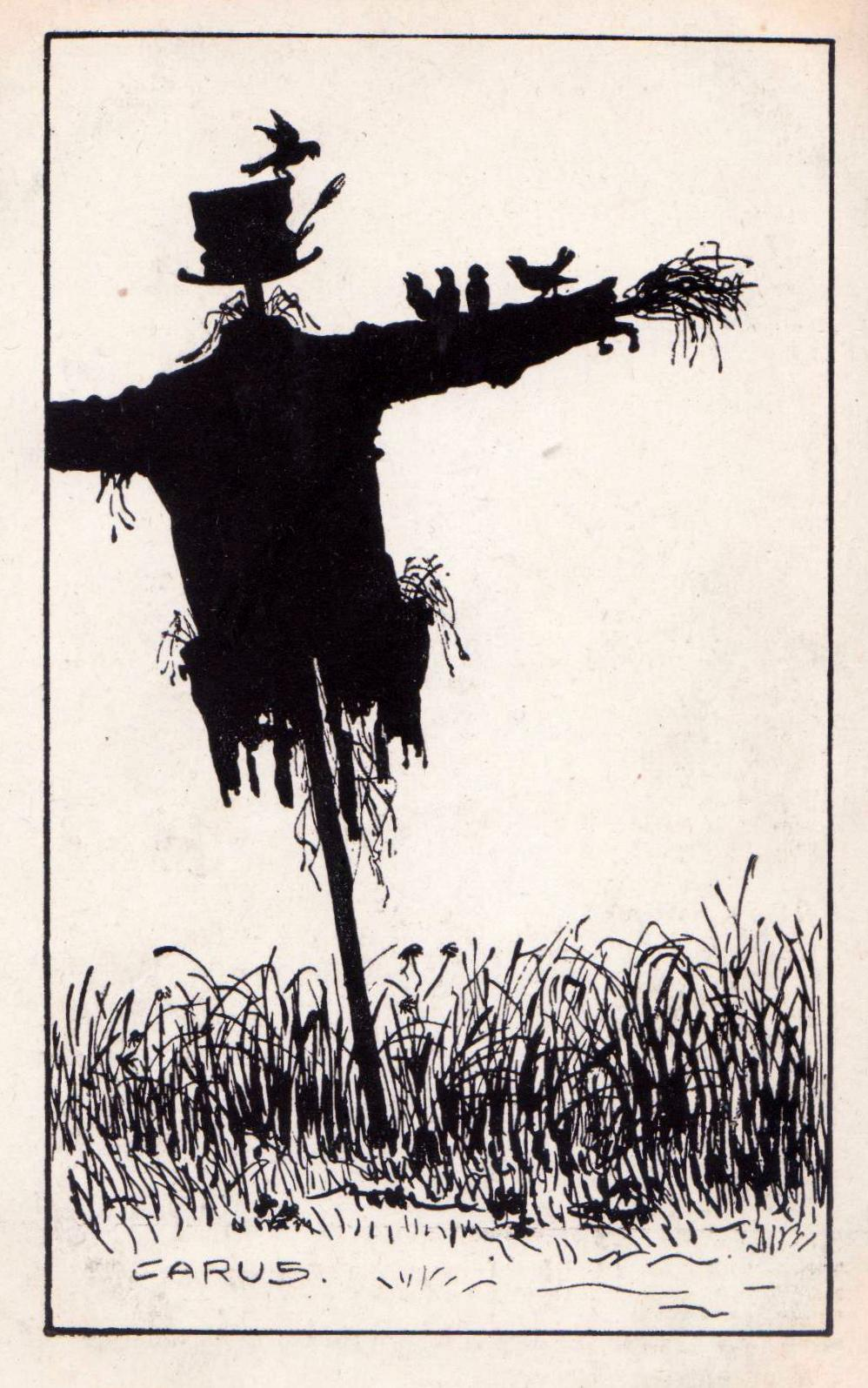
Scarecrow. Drawing by Carus. Postcard from 1910–1915.

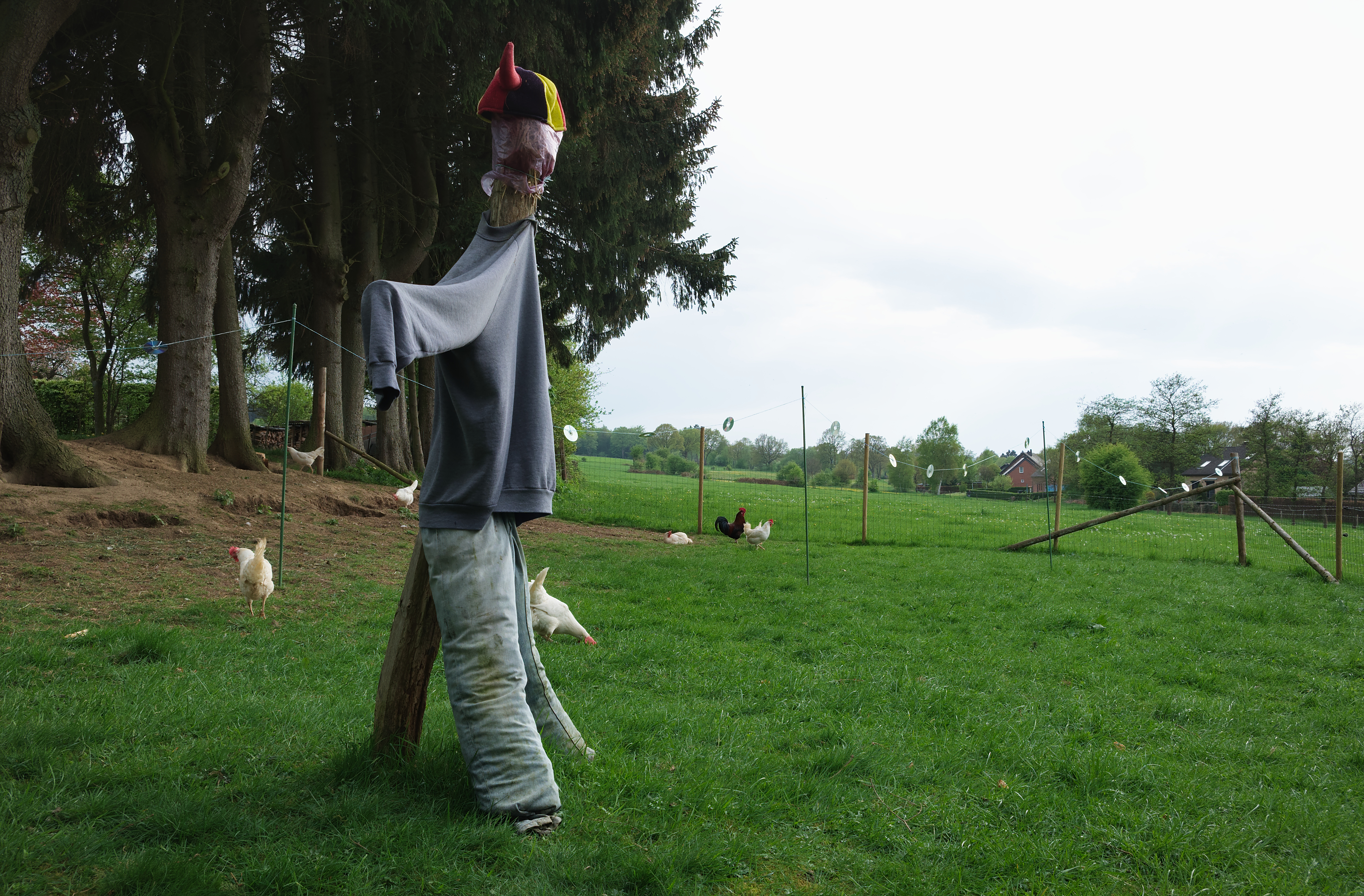
Scarecrow in Belgium

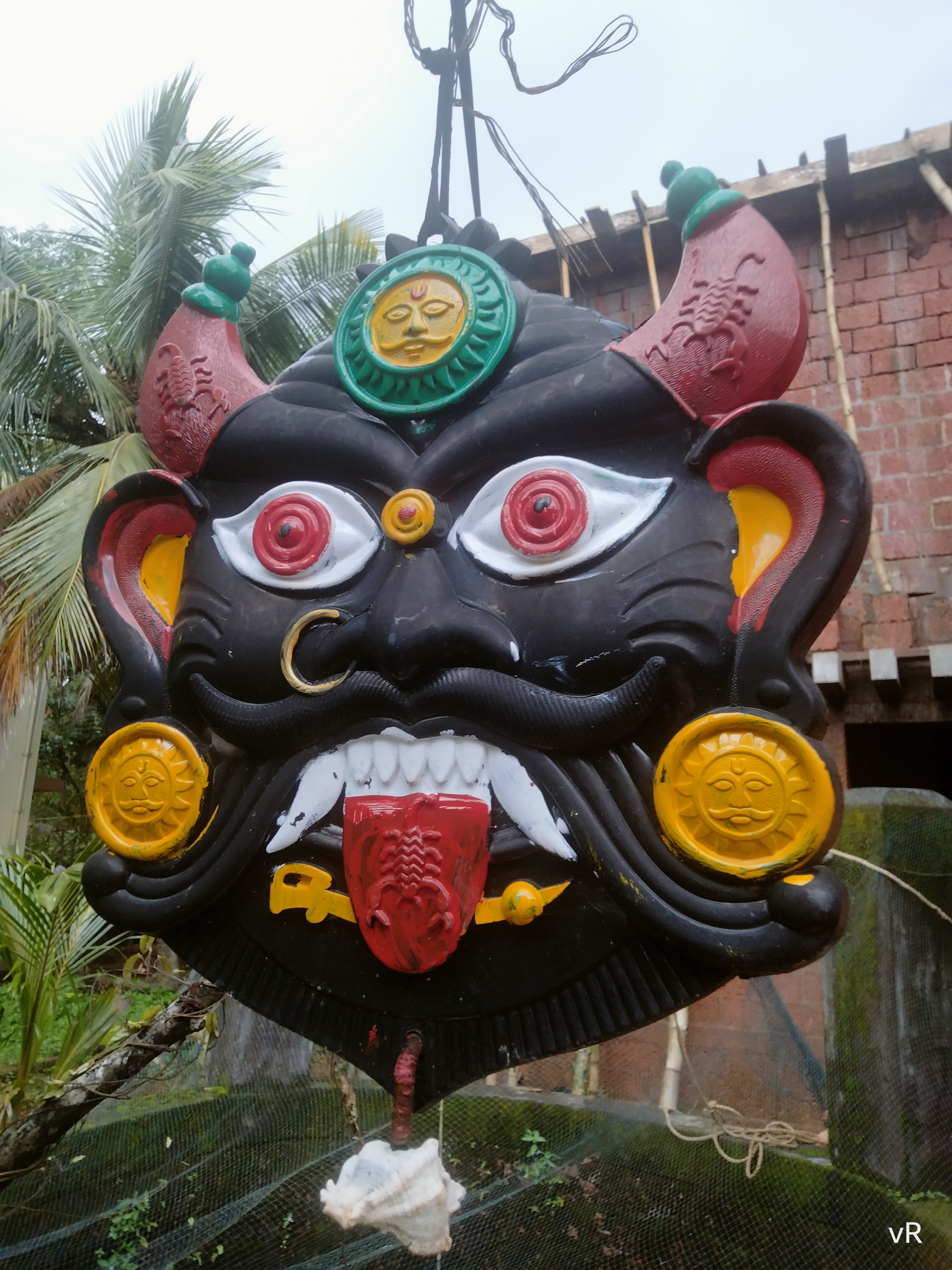
Scarecrow at Madikai Ambalathukara

Scarecrow at a construction site in Pondicherry

== See also ==
- Bird control
- Effigy
- Garden owl
- Henohenomoheji
- Klopotec
- Kostroma
- Kuebiko
- Kunekune (urban legend)
- Straw man (dummy)
- Sōzu
- Ting mong
