= Hakuto Shrine =

Shinto shrine in Tottori Prefecture, Japan

Hakuto Jinja (白兎神社)
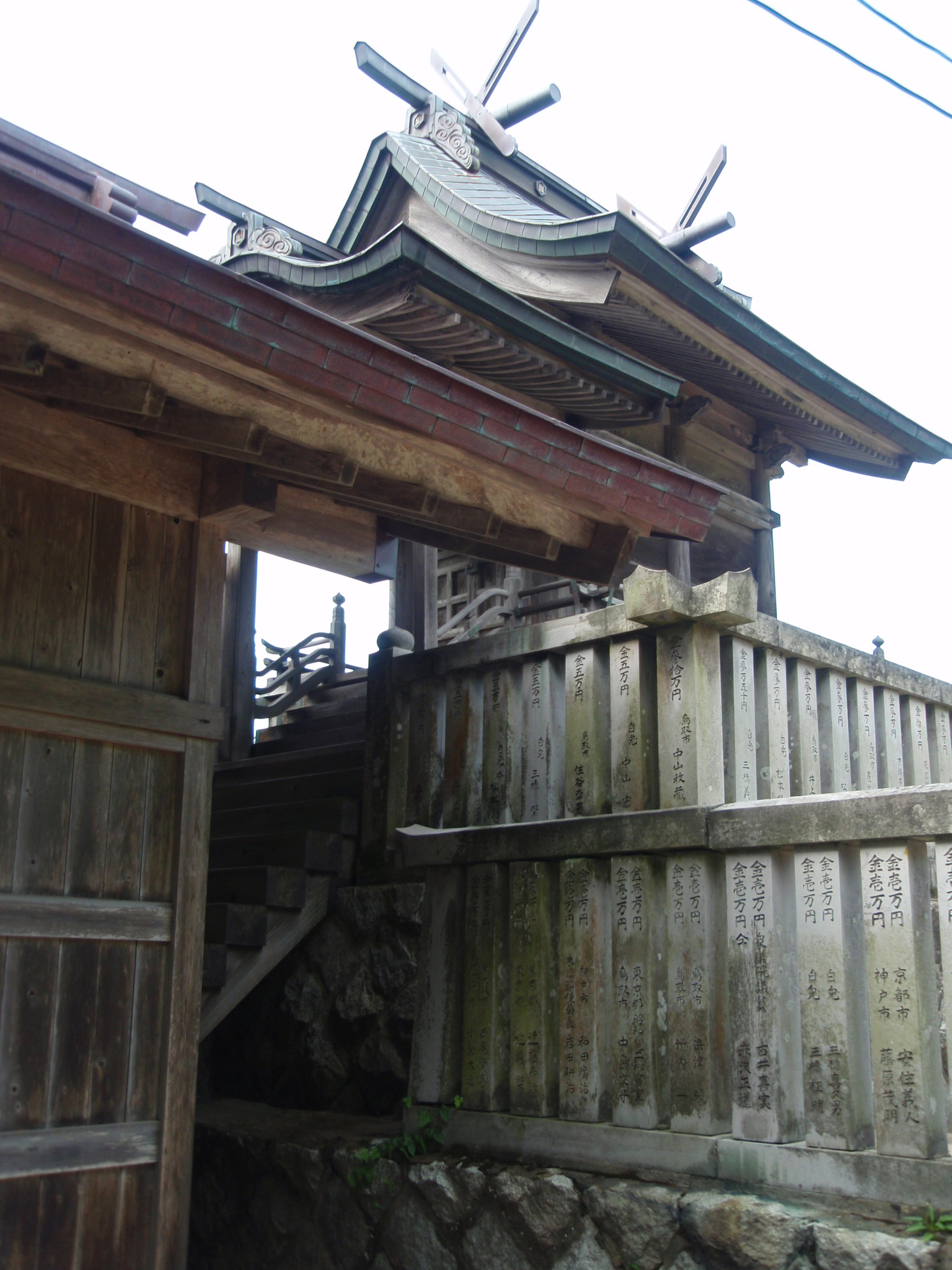
- Hakuto Shrine honden

- Location within Japan

Religion
- Affiliation: Shinto

Location
- Interactive map of Hakuto Jinja (白兎神社)
- Coordinates: 35°31′27″N 134°06′56″E

Hakuto Shrine (白兎神社, Hakuto Jinja) is a Shinto shrine in Tottori, Tottori Prefecture, Japan. The shrine is dedicated to the Hare of Inaba, a legend originating in ancient Inaba province. In 1937, its trees were designated a Natural Monument.

== See also ==
- Monuments of Japan
