= Miwa Shrine (disambiguation) =

Miwa Shrine (三輪神社, Miwa-jinja, also written as 三輪明神 Miwa-myōjin) refers to a number of related Shinto shrines in Japan dedicated to the kami Ōmononushi. It may refer to:

- Miwa Shrine, the main shrine in Sakurai, Nara Prefecture (formally known as Ōmiwa Shrine)
- Miwa Shrine (Gifu) in Gifu, Gifu Prefecture
- Miwa Shrine (Ōgaki) in Ōgaki, Gifu Prefecture
- Miwa Shrine (Ibigawa) in Ibigawa, Gifu Prefecture
- Miwa Shrine (Takatsuki) in Takatsuki, Osaka Prefecture

== See also ==
- Ōmiwa Shrine (disambiguation)
