= Tourism in Japan =

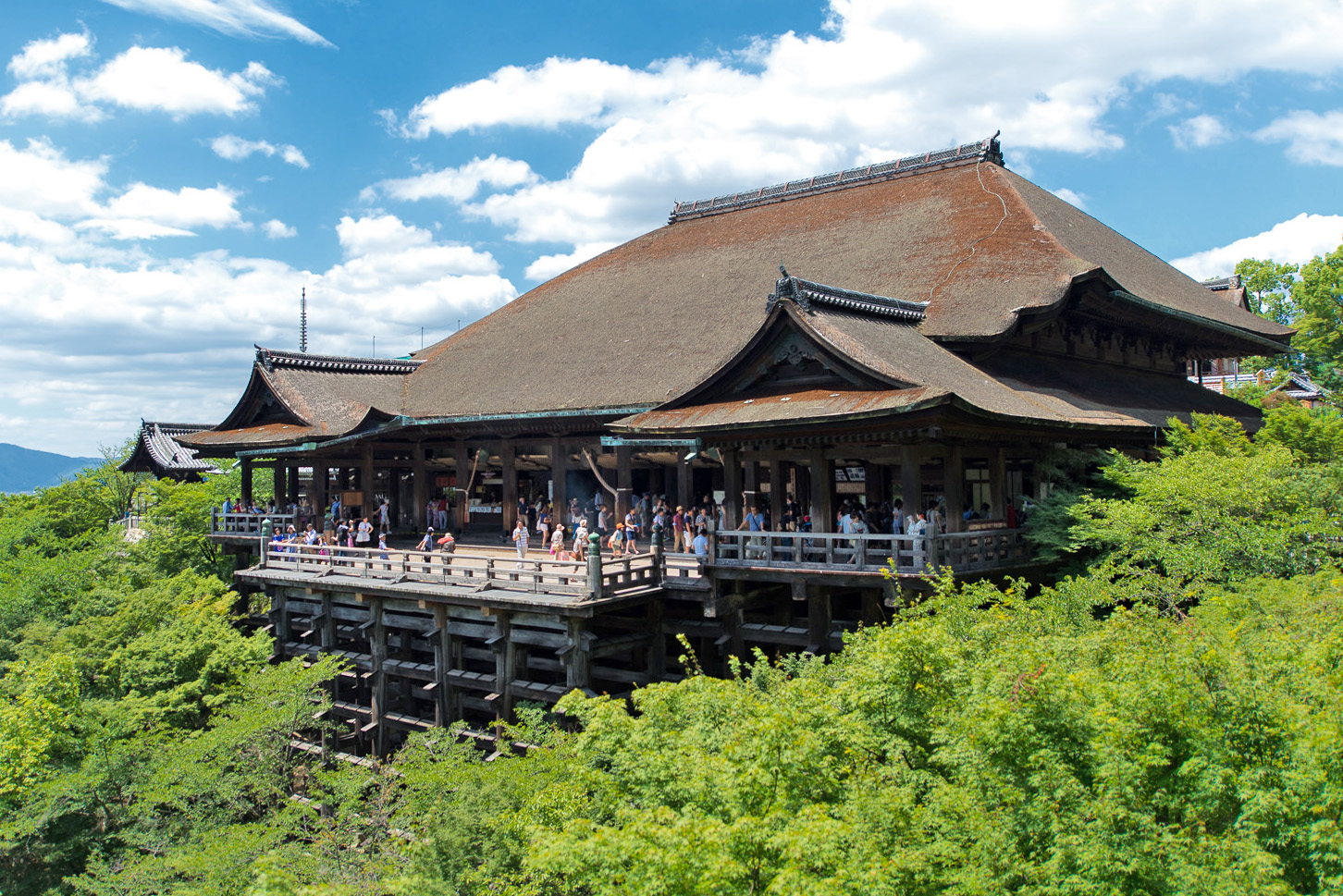
Kiyomizu-dera, the most crowded temple in Kyoto

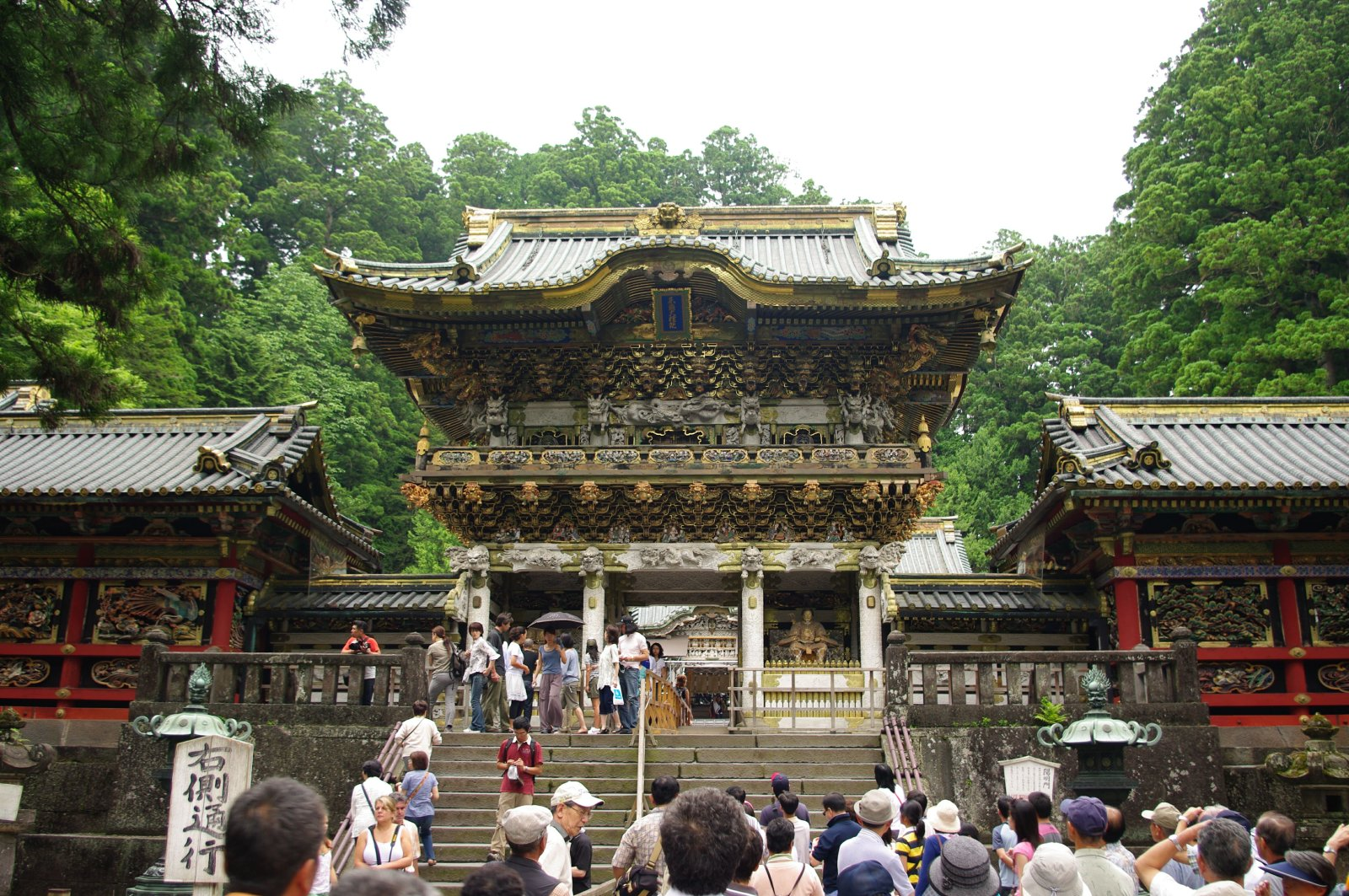
Crowds of tourists at Nikkō Tōshō-gū

Tourism in Japan is a major industry and contributor to the Japanese economy. In 2025, the number of international tourists visiting Japan was 42.7 million. The total number of domestic tourists in Japan, including day trips, reached 540 million in 2024, while total tourism consumption within the country amounted the same year to 34.3 trillion yen ($237 billion), accounting for 5.6% of the country’s GDP of 609 trillion yen ($4,208 billion). As of 2023, it is the world's fourth-largest travel and tourism market.

Japan's most visited prefectures are Tokyo, Osaka, Chiba, Kyoto and Fukuoka.

Among the most popular sites are Sensoji temple (Tokyo), Nikkô, the Fushimi Inari shrine or the Kinkakuji in Kyoto. Japan has 26 World Heritage Sites, including Himeji Castle and the Historic Monuments of Ancient Kyoto and Nara.

The 2024 Travel and Tourism Competitiveness Report ranked Japan 3rd out of 141 countries overall, which was the highest in Asia. Japan gained relatively high scores in almost all of the featured aspects, such as health and hygiene, safety and security, cultural resources and business travel.

Tourism is also at the heart of a debate in Japan, where there is growing frustration with the influx of visitors. The term "overtourism" is being used to describe this phenomenon.

== History ==
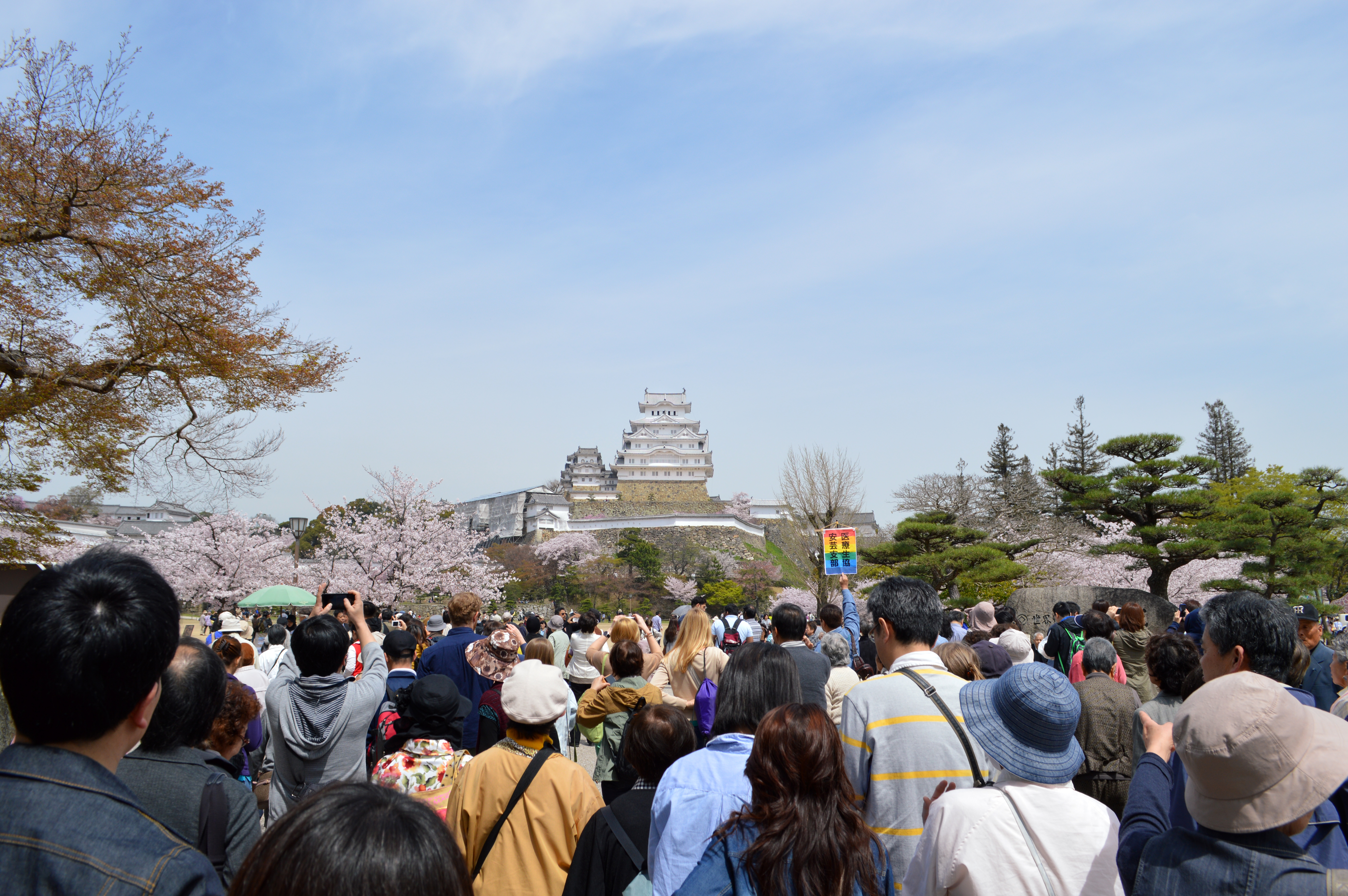
Throngs of tourists on their way to Himeji Castle in Himeji (WHS)

=== From the middle ages to early modern period ===
In medieval Japan, travel became increasingly common with cultural and aristocratic figures from Kyoto, and they initiated the genre of travel literature in Japan. Notable examples of travel literature from this period include the Tosa Nikki (935), part of the Sarashina Nikki (12th century), and the volume 4 of the Tohazugatari (1313). By the late medieval period, supported by a network of inns offering fixed-rate lodging and meals, travel was widespread. Hot springs such as Kusatsu, Arima, and Gero gained fame, attracting notable figures such as warriors and monks. Tourist souvenirs including ladles and toothpicks were popular among visitors. Pilgrimages to Mount Fuji also flourished.

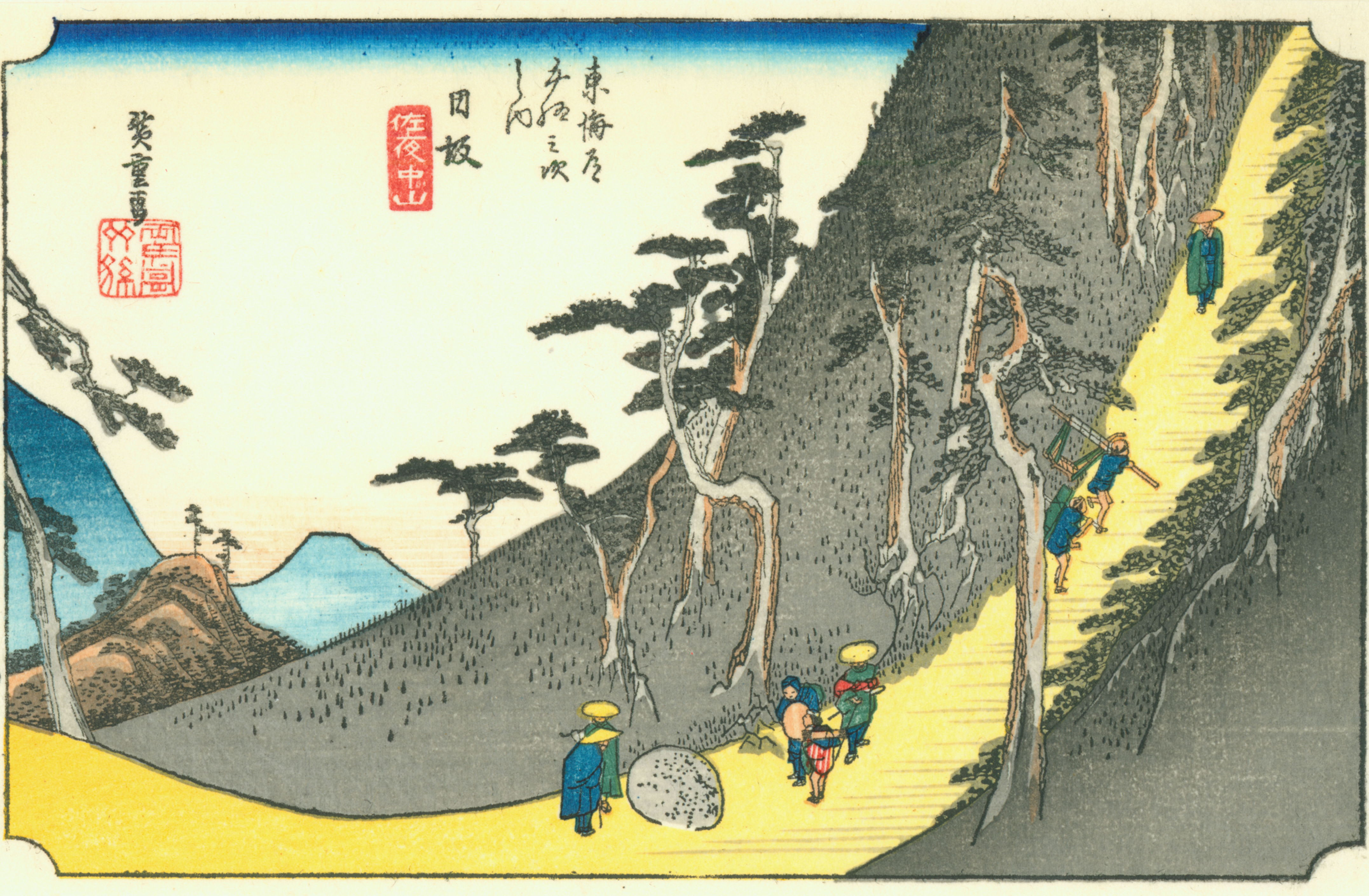
Travelling was popularised through travel literature and ukiyo-e

During the Edo period, despite restrictions on travelling through checkpoints, guidebooks facilitated the popularisation of travel. Commoners with permits could undertake leisure trips, often disguised as pilgrimages. Inns, teahouses, and local products thrived, and travel information spread via diaries and ukiyo-e prints. Pilgrimages such as the Ise Grand Shrine’s Okage Mairi became major social phenomena, marking the beginnings of a modern tourism industry. However, foreign travel was extremely rare due to Japan's isolation policy. Matsuo Bashō's 1689 trip to the then "far north" of Japan, which inspired his famous haibun work Oku no Hosomichi, occurred not long after Hayashi Razan categorized the Three Views of Japan in 1643. During this time, Japan was a closed country to foreigners, so no foreign tourism existed in Japan.

=== Meiji era and international tourism ===
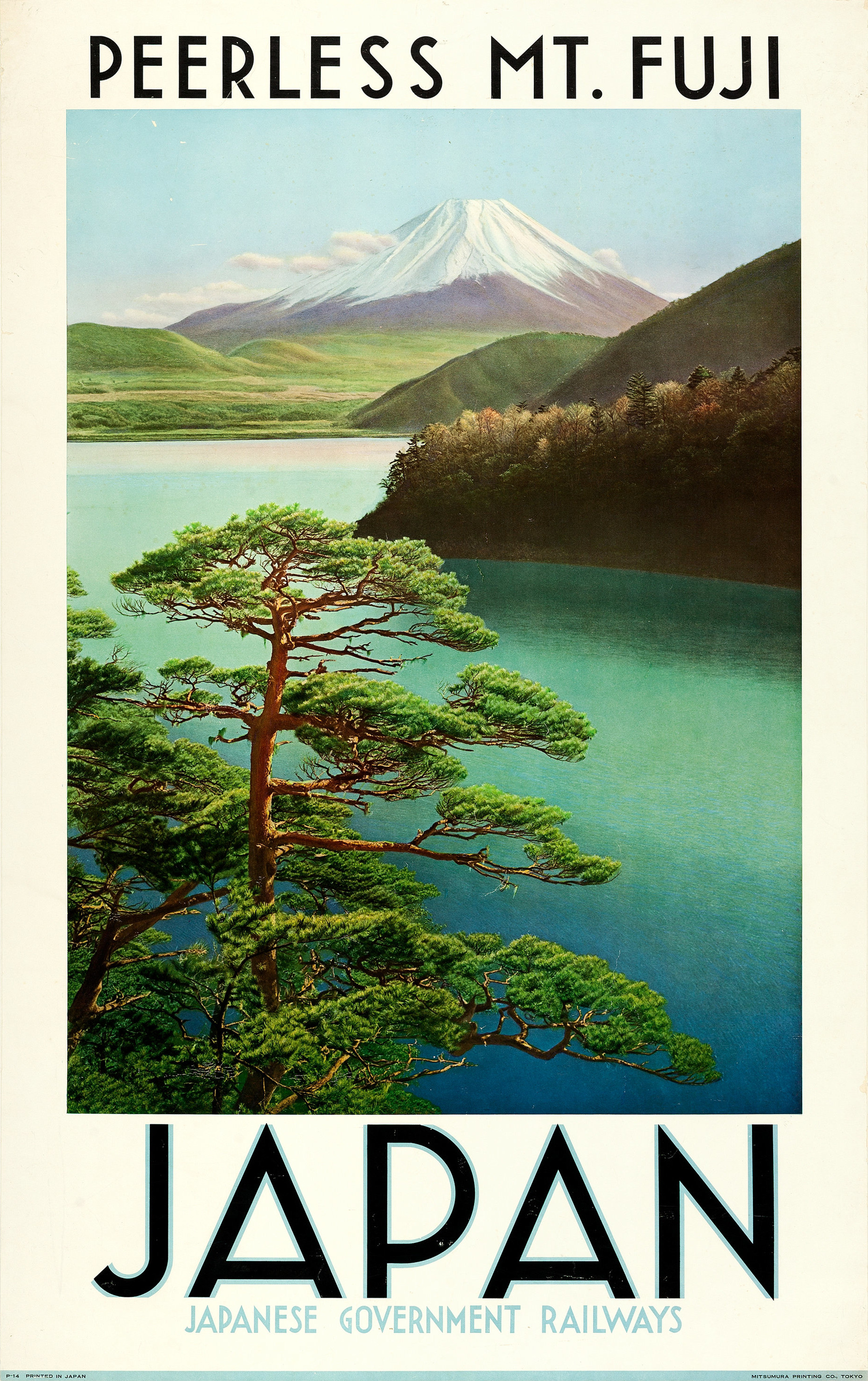
A 1930s travel advertisement by the Japanese Government Railways

Japan opened its borders in the late Edo period, but due to its location in the Far East and the limited transport options, there were not many foreign visitors. Foreigners eventually gained the freedom to travel within Japan, and efforts to actively attract international tourists began on the Japanese side. In 1912, the Japan Travel Bureau (JTB) was established. Another major milestone in the development of the tourism industry in Japan was the 1907 passage of the Hotel Development Law, as a result of which the Railways Ministry began to construct publicly owned hotels throughout Japan. During the interwar period, overseas travel to distant places such as Europe and the Americas was primarily limited to businesspeople, immigrants, and students, with leisure travel being mostly reserved for the wealthy.

In terms of domestic tourism, the dismantling of the feudal system, the development of transport networks such as railways and steamships, and the spread of information made domestic travel easier. Tourism-oriented travel became increasingly popular, and regions across Japan began developing themselves for sightseeing and leisure purposes. Long-distance domestic travel became accessible.

In 1930, the Japanese Government Railways created the Board of Tourist Industry (国際観光局, Kokusai Kankō Kyoku) with the specific goal of attracting foreign tourists to Japan. In addition to supporting the development of resort hotels, the Board was responsible for designing and printing posters and foreign-language guidebooks for distribution overseas. Due to the Pacific War, the Board was abolished in 1942.

=== Postwar period ===
During the postwar Allied occupation period, most foreign tourists in Japan were GHQ personnel or visitors from the United States. In 1954, Kōnosuke Matsushita, the founder of Panasonic, contributed an article titled The Case for a Tourism-Oriented Nation to Bungei Shunju. Matsushita argued that tourism could be considered a form of trade, and he pointed out that while exporting goods involves depleting Japan's resources, scenic attractions such as Mount Fuji and the Seto Inland Sea remain unchanged no matter how often they are viewed. He proposed that revenue earned through inbound tourism could be reinvested in other industries, and help rebuild the country's economy beyond its pre-war stature.

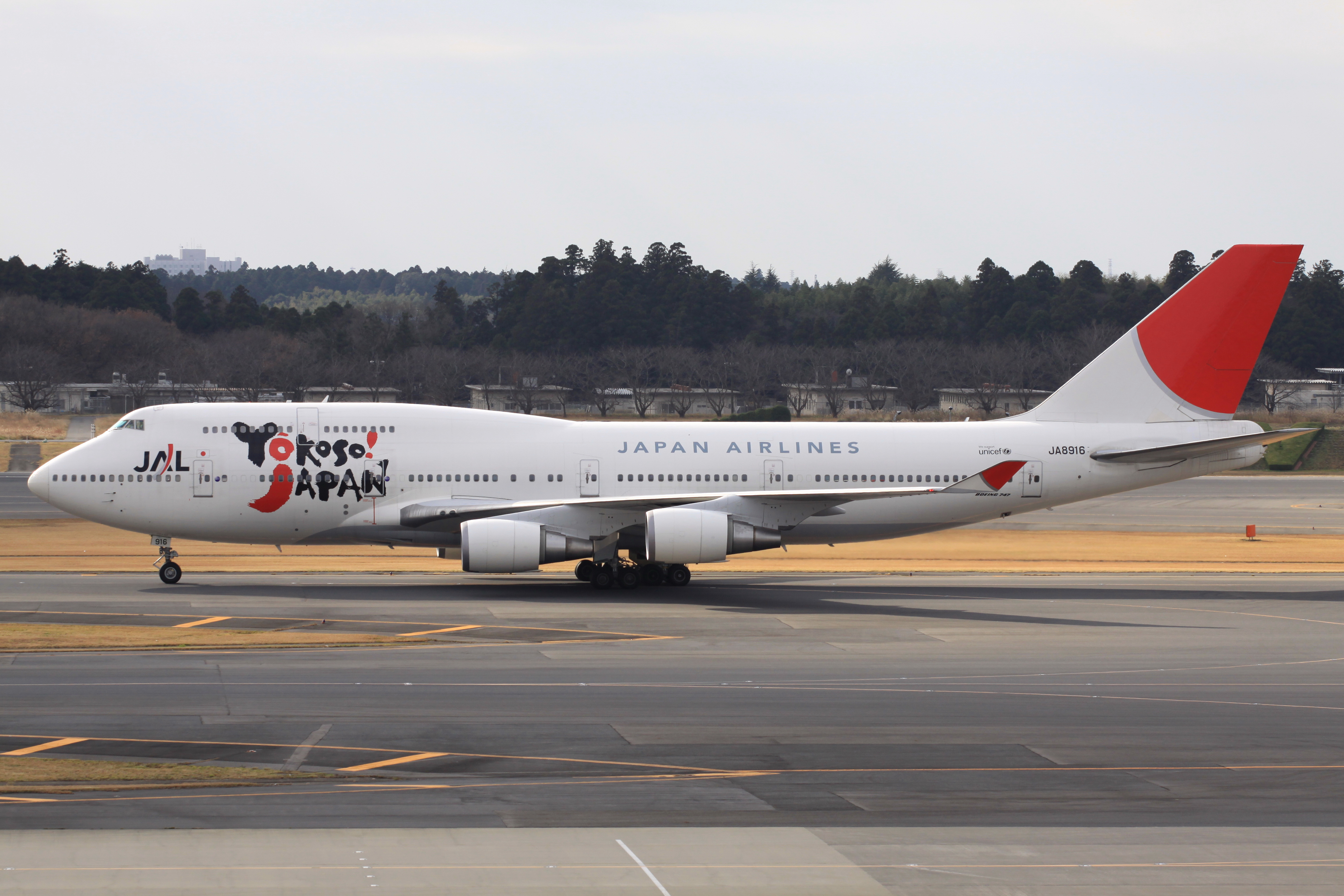
The Visit Japan campaign, launched by the Koizumi administration in 2003 with the catchphrase 'Yokoso! Japan!', was the country's first government-backed initiative to promote inbound tourism.

For much of post-war period, Japan has been an exceptionally unattractive tourist destination for its population and GDP size. From 1995 to 2014, Japan was by far the least visited G7 country, and typically ranked below smaller countries like Sweden in total numbers As of 2013, Japan was one of the least visited countries in the OECD on a per capita basis. Japan avoided campaigns to attract inbound tourists, especially because its large current account surplus had caused international friction with some countries. There were also factors such as Japan being among the world's most expensive countries at the time (for example, Tokyo was rated by the Economist Intelligence Unit as the most expensive city in the world for 14 years in a row ending in 2006), as well as the language barrier.

==== Active promotion of inbound tourism (21st century) ====
From 2013, under the Abe administration, policies to attract international tourists were implemented to offset the shrinking domestic demand caused by population decline and ageing. As a result, by 2014, for the first time in 55 years, income from foreign tourists exceeded the amount spent by Japanese tourists abroad, which means Japan finally ran a tourism surplus. Within six years, the number of international visitors has more than tripled, reaching 31.9 million visitors in 2019. Japan received a record 36.87 million tourist arrivals in 2024, an increase of over 47% from the year prior.

== Current status ==
Domestic tourism remains a vital part of Japanese economy and Japanese culture. Across the nation, Japanese children in many middle schools see the highlight of their years as a visit to Tokyo Tower, Yomiuriland, Tokyo Disneyland, Sensō-ji, and/or Tokyo Skytree, and many high school students often visit Okinawa or Hokkaido. The extensive rail network together with domestic flights sometimes in planes with modifications to favor the relatively short distances involved in intra-Japan travel allows efficient and speedy transport. International tourism plays a smaller role in the Japanese economy compared to other developed countries; in 2013, international tourist receipts was 0.3% of Japan's GDP, while the corresponding figure was 1.3% for the United States and 2.3% for France. In 2019, the value was up to 1.0% of GDP, driven by an increase in international tourism, while the country's GDP has remained stable.

From a statistical perspective, spending by international tourists in Japan is classified as exports. As a result, the inbound tourism industry ranks as the second-largest export industry after the automobile industry, which recorded 17.7 trillion yen ($122 billion) in export value. In 2025, domestic tourism spending by Japanese nationals, the number of international tourists, and the total tourism spending by international visitors all reached record highs.

Tourists from South Korea have made up the largest number of inbound tourists several times in the past. In 2010, their 2.4 million arrivals made up 27% of the tourists visiting Japan. Travelers from China have been the highest spenders in Japan by country, spending an estimated 196.4 billion yen (US$2.4 billion) in 2011, or almost a quarter of total expenditure by foreign visitors, according to data from the Japan Tourism Agency. From 2016 to 2020, Japanese government hoped to receive 40 million foreign tourists every year by 2020. According to the Japan National Tourism Organization in 2017, 3 out of 4 foreign tourists came from other parts of East Asia, namely South Korea, mainland China, Taiwan and Hong Kong.

The worldwide popularity of Japanese popular culture significantly drives tourism to Japan. Anime, manga, J-pop, cinema, video games, cuisine and other cultural facets have created a strong "soft power" appeal that draws millions of fans and tourists from around the globe to the country.

=== Overtourism ===
Following the easing of COVID-19-era travel restrictions, 2024 is on track to be a record-breaking year for the number of overseas tourists. This tourism boom can be attributed in part to the weakening Japanese yen. The unprecedented number of foreign tourists has led to claims that some parts of Japan are suffering from overtourism. In response to this surge, officials in some parts of Japan have introduced measures to counter its negative effects. For example, Yamanashi Prefecture has set a cap of daily climbers of Mount Fuji at 4,000 people and began charging an entrance fee of ¥2,000. Also in Yamanashi Prefecture, a mesh barrier was set up to block a view of Mount Fuji behind a Lawson convenience store in Fujikawaguchiko due to tourist-caused disturbances in the area. As of 2024, some Japanese officials have considered instituting a two-tiered pricing system which would have foreign tourists pay more than residents at certain tourist attractions in order to counter the effects of overtourism.

=== Motivation for visiting Japan ===
International Tourists: Foreign visitors travel to Japan for its seasonal beauty, cuisine, history, culture, manga and anime.

Domestic Tourists: Japanese domestic travelers are motivated by seasonal events, relaxation, and the desire to get out of the city. Many do short trips to hot springs, nature spots, or historical towns.

== Tourism statistics ==
Foreign tourists to Japan

These are the top 35 nationalities that visited Japan from 2018 to 2025:

Country/Territory	Total							
Country/Territory	3/2026	2025	2024	2023	2022	2021	2020	2019
South Korea	3,058,082	9,459,711	8,817,765	6,958,494	1,012,751	18,947	694,476	5,584,597
Taiwan	2,041,517	6,763,424	6,044,316	4,202,434	331,097	5,016	487,939	4,890,602
China	1,073,716	9,096,455	6,981,342	2,425,157	189,125	42,239	1,069,256	9,594,394
United States	803,473	3,306,823	2,724,594	2,045,854	323,513	20,026	219,307	2,187,557
Hong Kong	650,259	2,517,402	2,683,391	2,114,402	269,285	1,252	346,020	2,290,792
Thailand	392,916	1,233,103	1,148,848	995,558	198,037	2,758	219,830	1,318,977
Australia	344,608	1,058,396	920,196	613,062	88,648	3,265	143,508	621,771
Philippines	241,006	885,023	818,659	622,293	126,842	5,625	109,110	613,114
Malaysia	208,824	636,575	506,883	415,712	74,095	1,831	76,573	501,592
Indonesia	207,989	640,577	517,651	429,382	119,723	5,209	77,724	412,779
Vietnam	206,001	678,594	621,173	573,916	284,113	26,586	152,559	495,051
Canada	179,249	688,021	579,445	425,874	55,877	3,536	53,365	375,262
Singapore	170,747	726,251	691,226	591,267	131,969	857	55,273	492,252
United Kingdom	135,382	535,004	437,230	321,482	57,496	7,294	51,024	424,279
Germany	98,801	429,479	325,870	233,410	45,748	5,197	29,785	236,544
France	91,497	457,566	385,071	277,436	52,782	7,024	43,102	336,333
India	75,830	315,062	233,061	166,394	54,314	8,831	26,931	175,896
Italy	55,660	309,377	229,785	152,305	23,683	3,527	13,691	162,769
Mexico	55,395	200,395	151,835	94,684	9,152	1,124	9,528	71,745
Spain	44,576	245,576	182,284	115,873	15,926	3,053	11,741	130,243
Russia	41,182	194,908	99,264	41,965	10,324	3,723	22,260	120,043
New Zealand	34,479	136,875	115,012	78,978	12,107	1,404	16,070	94,115
Brazil	32,250	110,594	85,609	50,570	9,436	2,731	6,888	47,575
Turkey	25,710	107,730	62,099	31,198	7,129	1,161	2,886	22,724
Netherlands	25,286	133,093	102,981	74,486	12,064	1,860	8,481	79,479
Nepal	24,143	131,565	111,568	83,302	75,200	11,648	17,191	51,577
Myanmar	19,576	76,676	70,597	45,815	22,763	1,531	10,884	30,977
Mongolia	16,655	63,468	53,049	39,916	19,267	1,685	7,118	31,513
Switzerland	17,777	89,640	72,193	53,395	8,917	1,387	6,036	53,908
Poland	17,442	95,900	63,828	40,634	5,745	1,350	3,996	38,534
Sweden	17,341	69,903	52,099	39,245	7,900	1,112	7,622	53,836
Denmark	13,463	50,641	40,950	30,780	5,403	794	4,780	32,893
Ireland	12,205	45,037	32,995	22,985	4,458	820	3,270	39,387
Sri Lanka	12,064	53,984	49,015	36,742	21,536	3,127	8,918	28,380
Argentina	12,049	33,838	19,809	13,177	2,198	798	4,220	23,805
Israel	11,812	93,543	59,499	45,143	7,673	619	2,315	44,214
Portugal	11,536	57,391	42,300	27,812	3,176	728	3,179	32,349
Belgium	10,851	64,189	47,063	34,352	6,611	1,122	4,074	39,245
Norway	10,798	37,527	28,901	21,541	3,736	557	3,620	24,838
Austria	10,085	50,416	36,820	26,360	5,025	888	3,605	27,530
Cambodia	9,610	32,358	27,314	27,067	13,618	784	7,420	28,492
Finland	8,335	34,805	28,780	21,404	4,608	736	4,859	29,437
Bangladesh	8,115	31,019	23,896	19,559	11,981	1,789	4,444	15,174
Chile	7,531	23,739	18,460	13,808	1,902	276	3,381	13,370
Pakistan	7,058	30,171	23,710	21,132	11,423	4,284	6,145	17,208
Czech Republic	5,930	31,667	19,924	13,958	2,487	753	1,679	14,356
Romania	5,894	30,736	22,765	15,316	2,376	552	1,409	14,837
Greece	5,323	21,044	14,885	9,969	1,869	744	1,091	9,494
Colombia	5,199	22,572	15,602	9,598	1,495	476	1,098	11,745
Peru	4,359	12,097	6,582	5,195	1,196	254	1,191	6,022
Hungary	4,283	22,292	15,827	11,316	2,511	1,034	1,302	12,696
South Africa	4,179	19,187	12,541	9,357	2,561	838	1,623	19,543
Kazakhstan	4,081	16,422	10,375	8,571	1,511	601	890	5,431
Ukraine	3,144	13,910	9,412	6,749	3,795	1,070	1,466	10,176
Saudi Arabia	3,028	24,088	17,443	12,380	2,403	1,039	11,152	7,403
Lithuania	2,812	13,896	9,377	6,226	1,286	272	672	5,260
Laos	2,695	10,104	7,429	6,359	1,804	150	1,169	6,154
Bulgaria	2,663	13,030	9,480	6,360	1,024	338	627	6,324
Uzbekistan	2,426	12,321	9,068	8,075	5157	1,567	1,290	5,243
Croatia	2,383	10,015	6,078	4,067	634	414	470	4,099
Brunei	2,210	8,070	7,335	6,292	1,159	23	742	4,866
United Arab Emirates	1,849	15,867	14,512	10,270	2,705	203	770	8,891
Estonia	1,706	6,262	4,512	3,458	753	224	584	3,379
Egypt	1,688	9,634	7,080	4,816	2,223	1,187	1,294	6,345
Slovenia	1,684	10,007	6,038	3,779	676	308	493	3,347
Iran	741	9,008	9,387	7,145	2,152	746	720	5,252
Total (all countries)	10,683,888	42,683,837	36,870,148	25,066,350	3,832,110	245,862	4,115,828	31,882,049

== Major tourist destinations ==
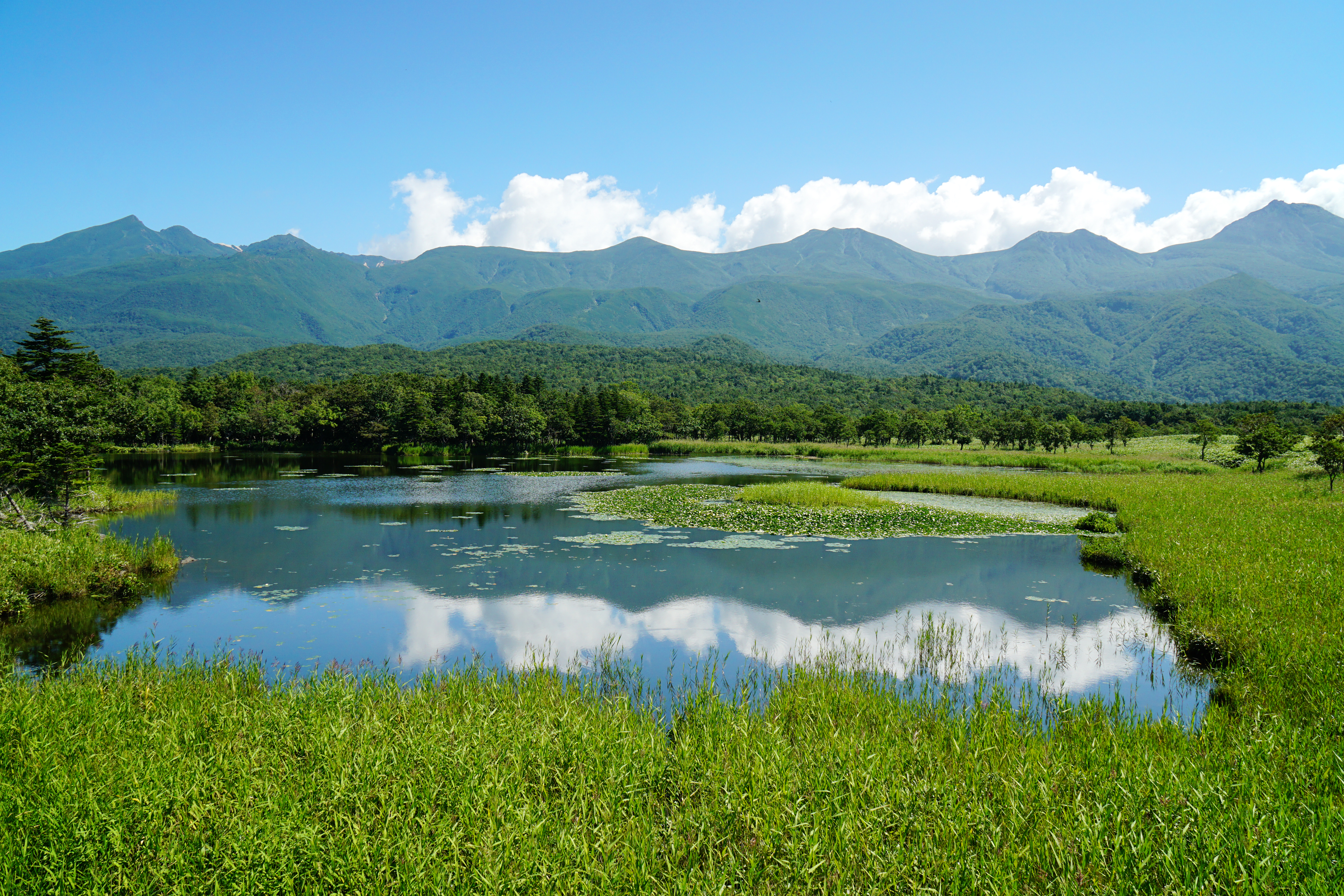
Goko Five Lakes in Shiretoko (WHS)

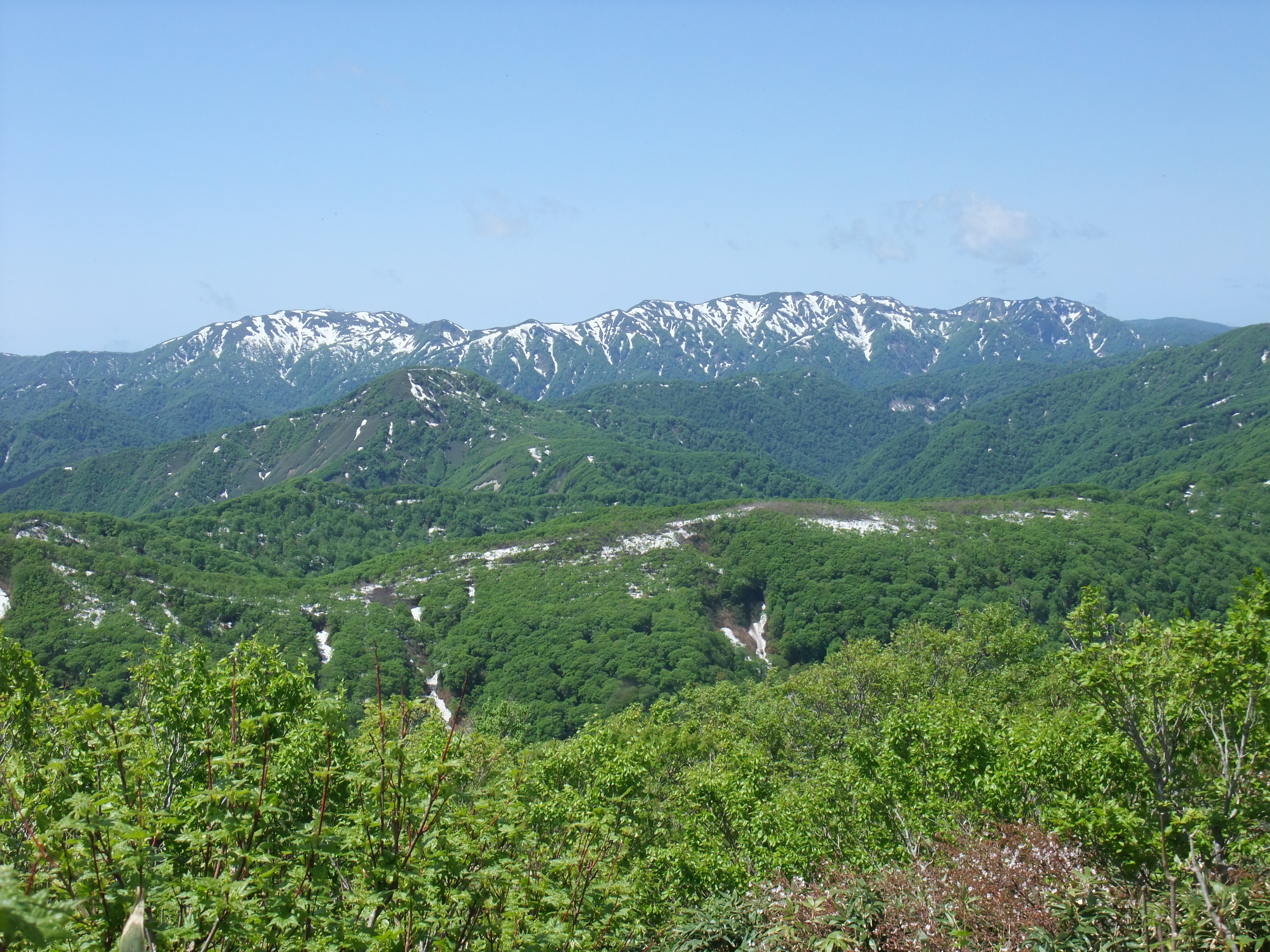
Shirakami-Sanchi (WHS)

Shinjuku in Tokyo, and Mount Fuji

Shirakawa-gō (WHS)

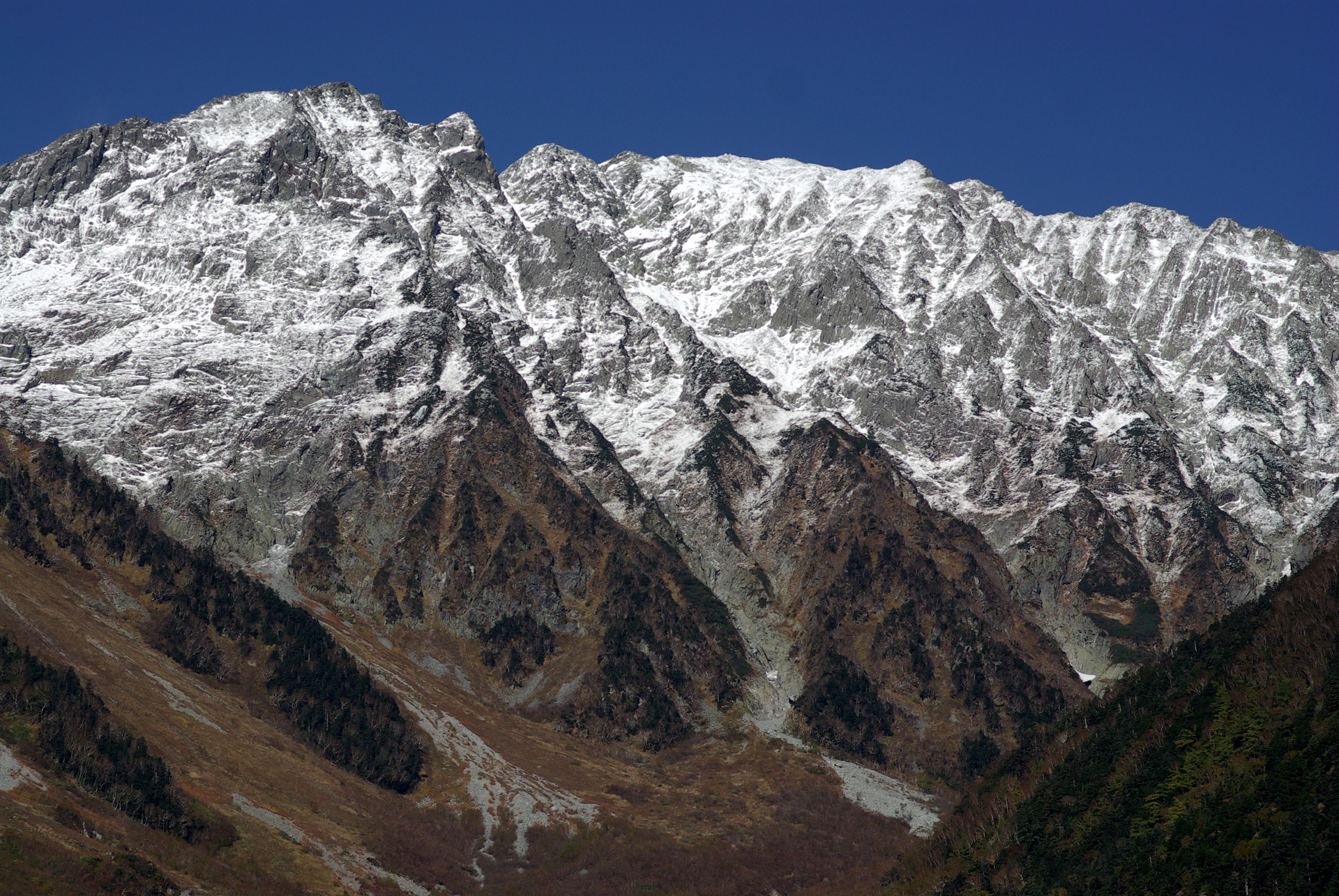
Japanese Alps from Kamikōchi

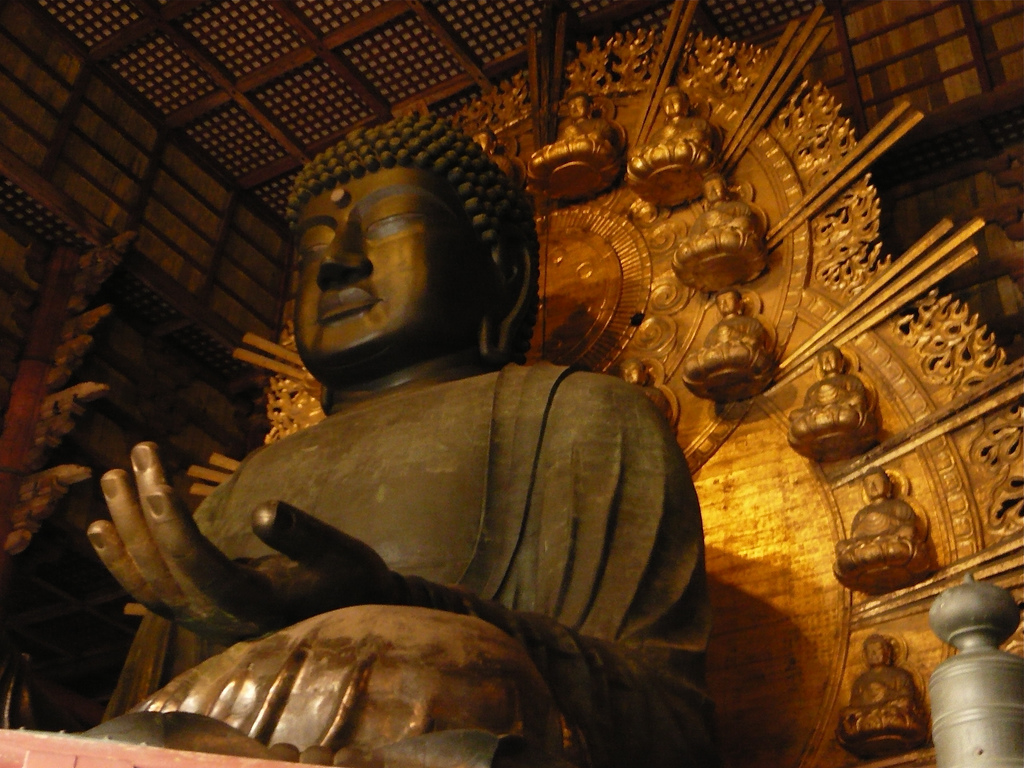
Tōdai-ji Daibutsu in Nara (WHS)

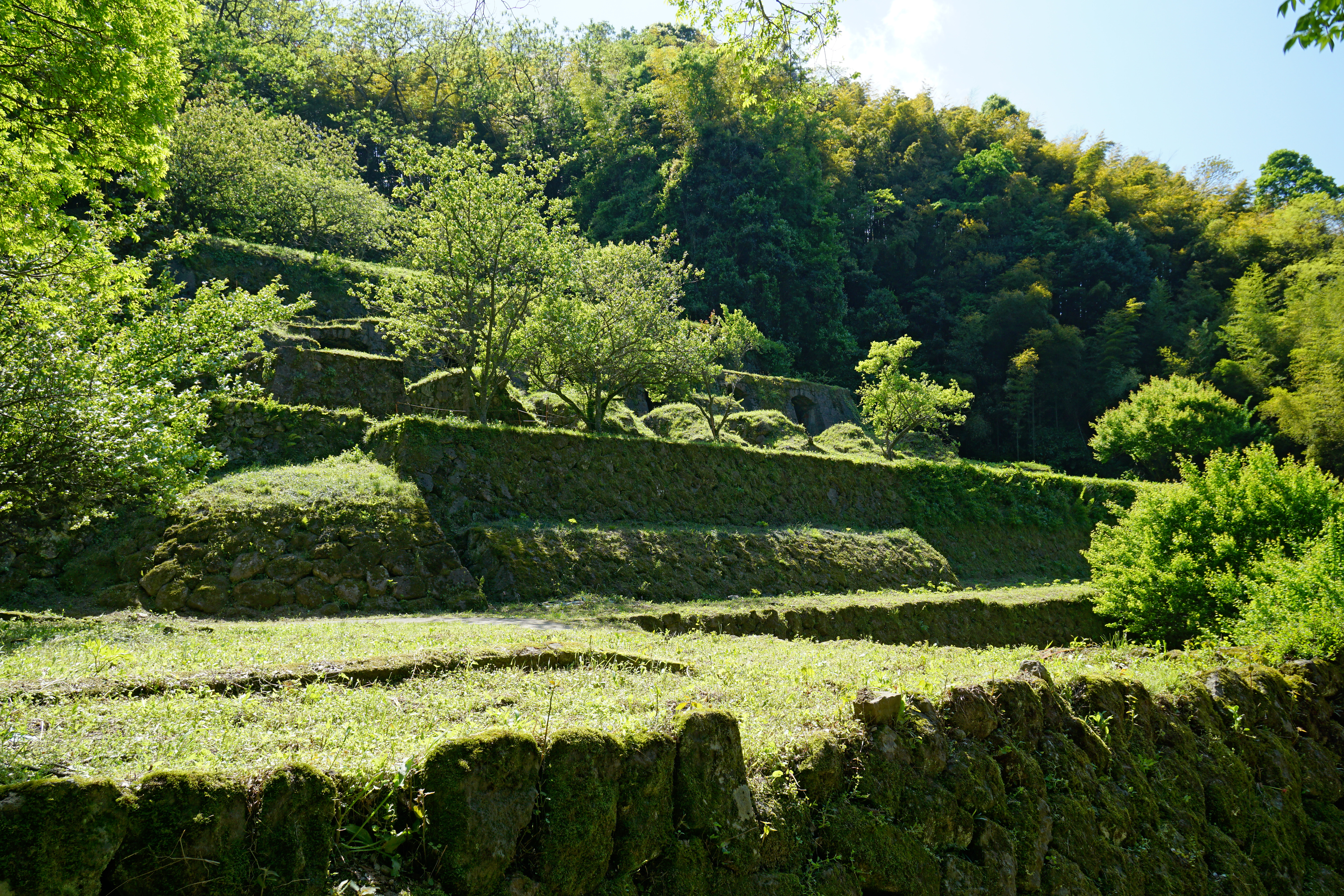
Iwami Ginzan Silver Mine (WHS)

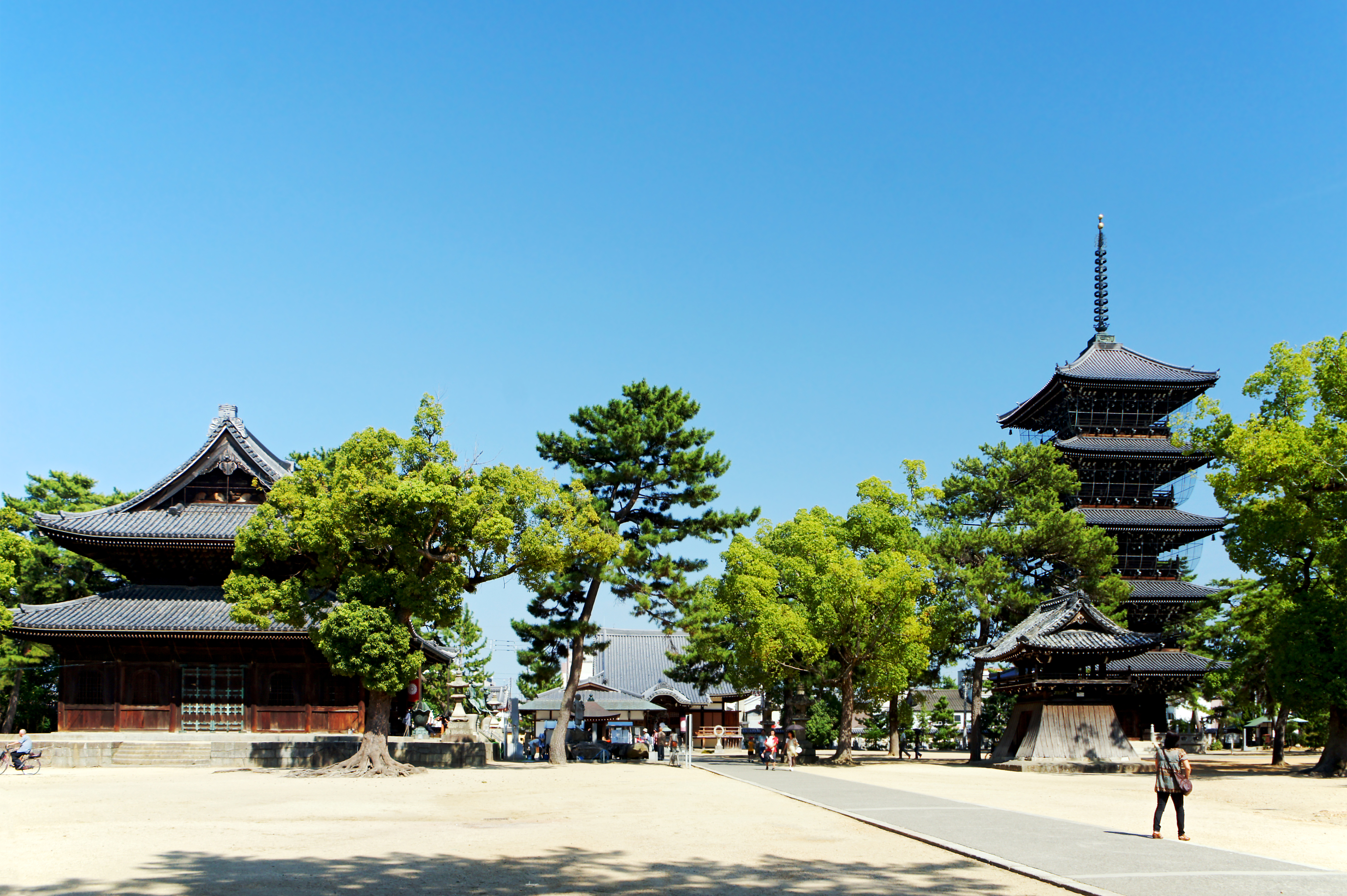
Shikoku Pilgrimage (Zentsū-ji)

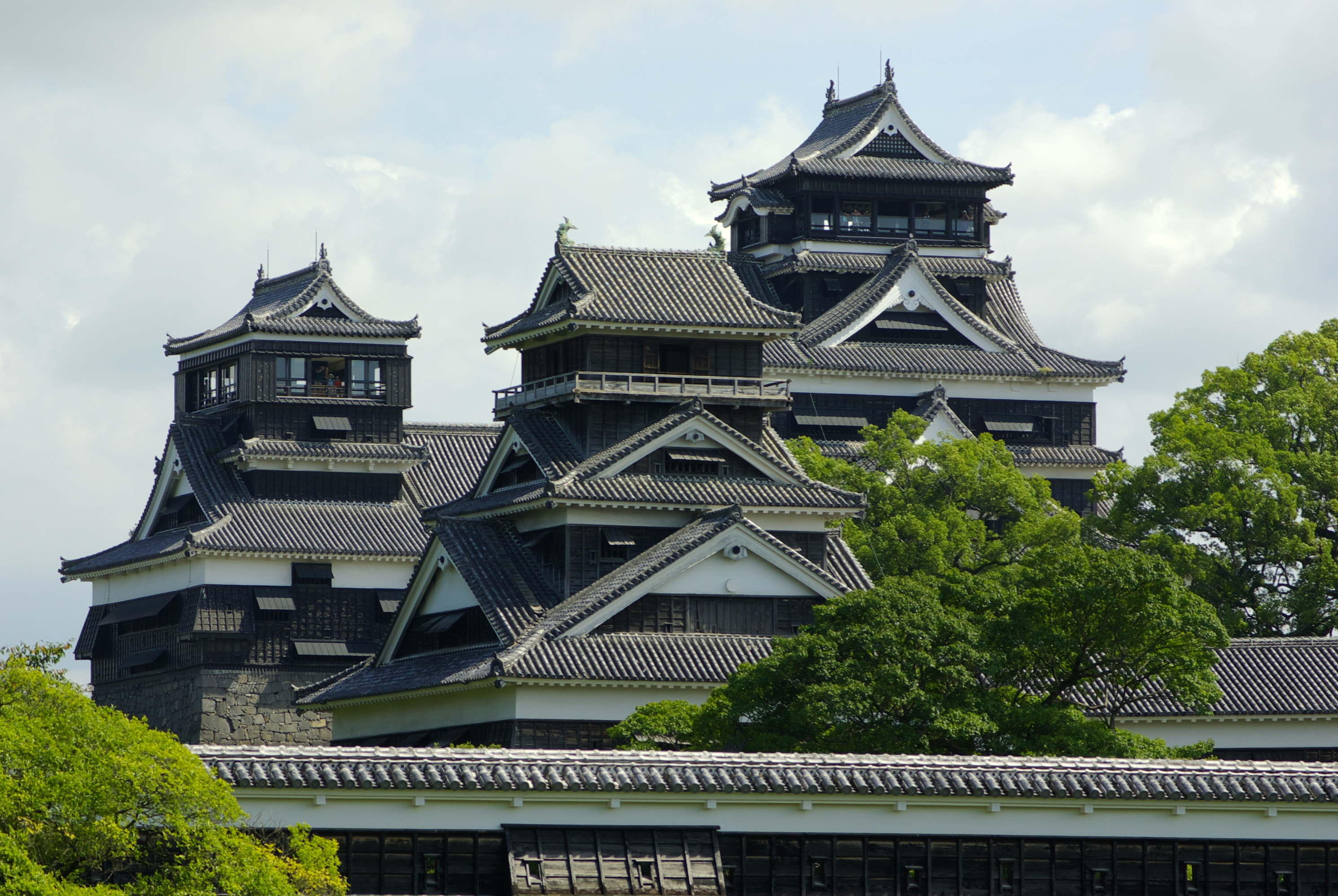
Kumamoto Castle, Kumamoto

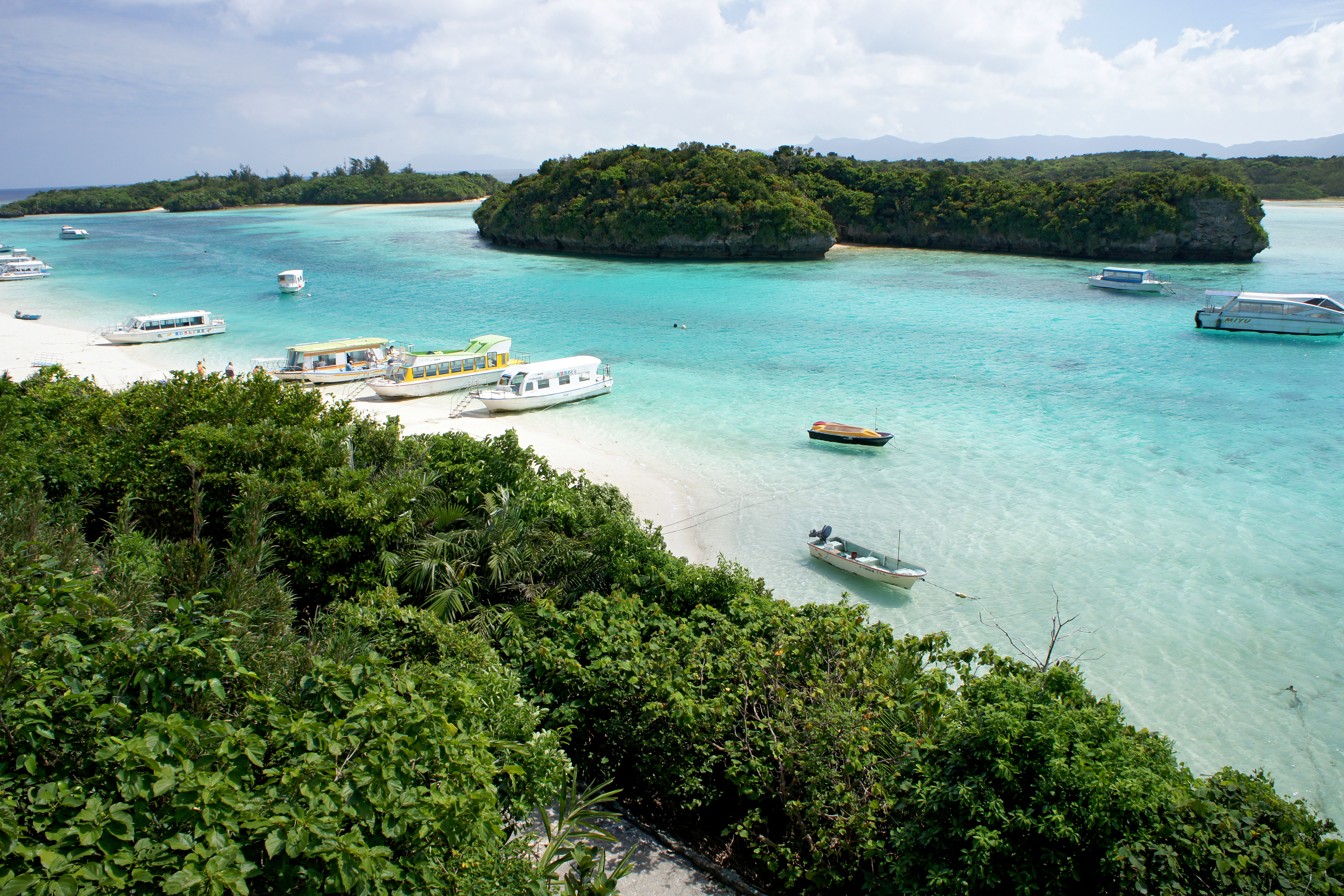
Ishigaki Island, Okinawa

=== Hokkaido ===
- Niseko Ski Resort
- Shiretoko Peninsula (WHS)
- Teshikaga – Lake Mashū, Lake Kussharo
- Tōya Caldera and Mount Usu Geopark
- Daisetsuzan Volcanic Group
- Hakodate
- Otaru

=== Tōhoku region ===
- Shirakami-Sanchi (WHS)
- Mount Osore
- Lake Towada
- Hirosaki – Hirosaki Castle, Nakacho Samurai District
- Hiraizumi – Chūson-ji, Mōtsū-ji, Kanjizaiō-in, Takkoku-no-Iwaya
- Semboku – Kakunodate Samurai District, Lake Tazawa, Nyūtō Onsen
- Yamagata – Yama-dera Temple, Zaō Onsen
- Matsushima

=== Kantō region ===
- Nikkō – Shrines and Temples of Nikkō (WHS), Kegon Falls, Lake Chūzenji, Cedar Avenue of Nikko
- Tomioka Silk Mill (WHS)
- Kinugawa Onsen – Edo Wonderland Nikko Edomura, Tobu World Square
- Utsunomiya – Oya stone museum, Utsunomiya Futarayama Shrine
- Ashikaga, Tochigi – Ashikaga Gakkō, Ashikaga Flower Park
- Tokyo – Imperial Palace, Asakusa, Akihabara, Ginza, Harajuku/Omotesandō, Nakano Broadway, Shibuya, Shinjuku, Tsukiji Fish Market, Ueno Park, Fujiko F. Fujio Museum, Studio Ghibli Museum
- Tokyo Disney Resort
- Kamakura – Tsurugaoka Hachiman-gū, Kōtoku-in, Kenchō-ji, Engaku-ji, Meigetsu-in, Hase-dera
- Kusatsu Onsen
- Hakone Onsen

=== Chūbu region ===
- Mount Fuji
- Japanese Alps – Tateyama Kurobe Alpine Route(Mount Tate), Hida Mountains, Kiso Mountains, Akaishi Mountains
- Kurobe Gorge Railway
- Shiga Kōgen
- Matsumoto – Matsumoto Castle, Mount Hotaka, Kamikōchi
- Shirakawa-gō and Gokayama (WHS)
- Takayama – Sanmachi Traditional Street, Ōshinmachi Traditional Street, Higashiyama Temple Area
- Kanazawa – Kenroku-en Garden, Kanazawa Castle, Higashi Geisha District, Nagamachi Samurai District
- Sakai – Tōjinbō, Maruoka Castle
- Nagoya – Nagoya Castle, Atsuta Shrine, Sakae, Nagoya Station (Meieki), Ōsu Kannon temple

=== Kansai region ===
- Kyoto – Kinkaku-ji, Ginkaku-ji, Kiyomizu-dera, Ryōan-ji, Sanjūsangen-dō, etc., they are parts of Historic Monuments of Ancient Kyoto (WHS)
- Uji – Byōdō-in and Ujigami Shrine (WHS), Relation of The Tale of Genji
- Ōtsu – Lake Biwa, Hiyoshi Taisha, Sakamoto Temple District, Mount Hiei, Enryaku-ji (WHS)
- Ōmihachiman – Traditional Riverside District
- Nara – Tōdai-ji, Tōshōdai-ji, Kōfuku-ji, Yakushi-ji, Heijō Palace, Kasuga-taisha and Nara Park, etc. They are parts of the Historic Monuments of Ancient Nara (WHS).
- Ikaruga – Hōryū-ji and Hōki-ji are Buddhist Monuments in the Hōryū-ji Area (WHS).
- Yoshino (Mount Yoshino) – Kimpusen-ji, Yoshimizu Shrine, Yoshino Mikumari Shrine, etc. They are parts of the Sacred Sites and Pilgrimage Routes in the Kii Mountain Range (WHS).
- Shingū – Kumano Hayatama Taisha and Kumano River (WHS)
- Nachikatsuura – Nachi Falls, Kumano Kodō, etc., they are parts of Sacred Sites and Pilgrimage Routes in the Kii Mountain Range (WHS)
- Mount Kōya – Kongōbu-ji (WHS)
- Osaka – Osaka Castle, Umeda, Namba, Dōtonbori, Shinsaibashi, Shinsekai, Shitennō-ji, Sumiyoshi-taisha, Universal Studios Japan, Kaiyukan, Rinku Town, Den-Den Town, Expo Commemoration Park, Kamagasaki
- Himeji – Engyō-ji, Koko-en Garden, and Himeji Castle (WHS)
- Kobe – Port of Kobe, Rokkō Mountains, Kitano-chō, Arima Onsen, Kobe Luminarie
- San'in Kaigan Geopark – Toyooka, Izushi, Kinosaki Onsen, Yumura Onsen

=== Chūgoku region ===
- Hiroshima Prefecture – Itsukushima Shrine (WHS), Onomichi, Tomonoura
- Okayama Prefecture – Kurashiki, Kōrakuen Garden, Okayama Castle
- Tottori Prefecture – Tottori Sand Dunes, Mount Daisen, Mount Hyōno, San'in Kaigan Geopark
- Shimane Prefecture – Iwami Ginzan Silver Mine (WHS), Izumo-taisha, Matsue Castle, Oki Islands, Tsuwano
- Yamaguchi Prefecture – Hagi

=== Shikoku ===
- Shikoku Pilgrimage (Zentsū-ji, Motoyama-ji, etc.)
- Ehime Prefecture – Dōgo Onsen, Matsuyama Castle
- Kagawa Prefecture – Kotohira-gū Shrine, Ritsurin Garden, Shōdo Island, Naoshima Island
- Tokushima Prefecture – Naruto whirlpools, Awa Dance Festival in Tokushima
- Kōchi Prefecture – Kōchi Castle, Cape Muroto (Muroto Geopark), Cape Ashizuri

=== Kyushu ===
- Ōita Prefecture – Many types of hot springs in Beppu, Ōita or Yufuin, Ōita, Usa jingū, stone bridges, small stonehenge on the top of Komekamiyama (mountain), Hello Kitty Harmonyland
- Nagasaki Prefecture – Ōura Church, Higashi-Yamate, Minami-Yamate including the Glover Garden, Huis Ten Bosch (theme park), Hidden Christian Sites (WHS)
- Kagoshima Prefecture – Yakushima (WHS), Sakurajima, Amami Ōshima
- Miyazaki Prefecture – Kirishima-Yaku National Park, Takachiho, Old Exculibur on the top of Takachiho-kyo mountain, Nichinan, Miyazaki, Chambered barrows of Saitobaru kofungun, Heiwadai Park
- Kumamoto Prefecture – Kumamoto Castle, Mount Aso
- Saga Prefecture – Pre-400 BC Yayoi archaeological site in Yoshinogari site
- Fukuoka Prefecture – Mojiko Retro Town, Kokura Castle, Dazaifu Tenman-gū, Remains of Dazaifu (government)

=== Okinawa ===
- Okinawa Prefecture – Shuri Castle, Nakagusuku Castle, Nakijin Castle, etc. They are parts of the Gusuku Sites and Related Properties of the Kingdom of Ryukyu.
- Okinawa Prefecture -- American Village, Okinawa Churaumi Aquarium, Chuo Park Avenue, Himeyuri Peace Museum
- Okinawa Prefecture -- (WHS), Ishigaki Island, Miyako Island, Iriomote Island, Traditional Ryukyuan Houses in Taketomi Island (something to note is that, Traditional Ryukyuan Houses are across All of the former Ryukyuan Kingdom, not just specifically Taketomi Island.)

== See also ==
- Groups of Traditional Buildings
- Japanese museums
- List of National Geoparks in Japan
- List of Special Places of Scenic Beauty, Special Historic Sites and Special Natural Monuments
- World Heritage Sites in Japan
- List of museums in Japan
- National Treasures of Japan
- Omiyage
- Ryokan (Japanese inn)
- Visa policy of Japan
