= Historic Monuments of Ancient Kyoto (Kyoto, Uji and Otsu Cities) =

UNESCO World Heritage Site in Japan

UNESCO World Heritage Site
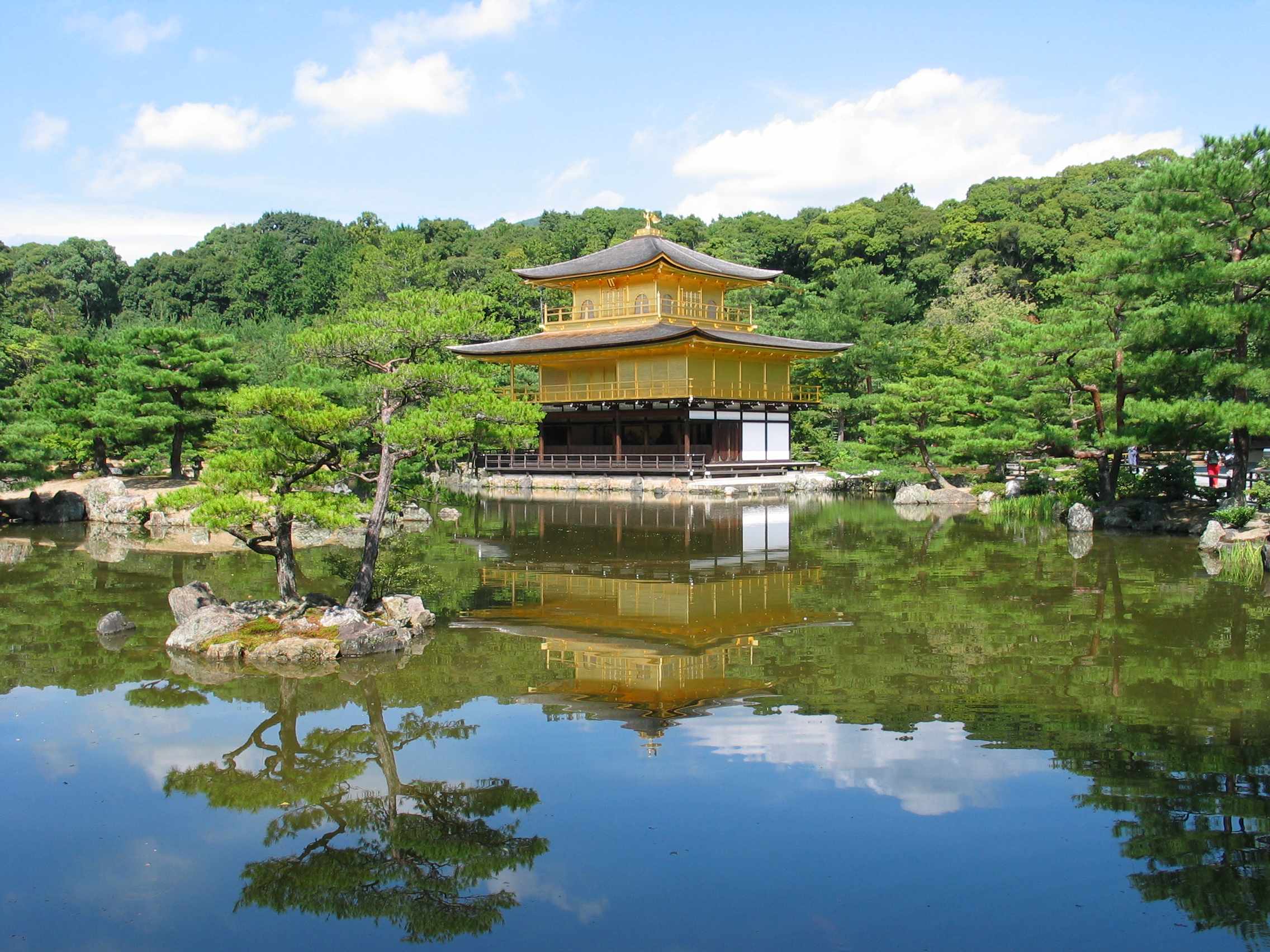
- Kinkakuji in Kyoto

- Location within Kansai region Location within Japan
- Location: Kansai region, Honshu, Japan
- Criteria: Cultural: (ii), (iv)
- Reference: 688
- Inscription: 1994 (18th Session)
- Area: 1,056 ha (2,610 acres)
- Buffer zone: 3,579 ha (8,840 acres)

The UNESCO World Heritage Site Historic Monuments of Ancient Kyoto (Kyoto, Uji and Otsu Cities) encompasses 17 locations in Japan within the city of Kyoto and its immediate vicinity. In 794, the Japanese imperial family moved the capital to Heian-kyō. The locations are in three cities: Kyoto and Uji in Kyoto Prefecture; and Ōtsu in Shiga Prefecture; Uji and Ōtsu border Kyoto to the south and north, respectively. Of the monuments, 13 are Buddhist temples, three are Shinto shrines, and one is a castle. The properties include 38 buildings designated by the Japanese government as National Treasures, 160 properties designated as Important Cultural Properties, eight gardens designated as Special Places of Scenic Beauty, and four designated as Places of Scenic Beauty. UNESCO listed the site as World Heritage in 1994.

== Selection criteria ==
Kyoto has a substantial number of historic buildings, unlike other Japanese cities that lost buildings to foreign invasions and war; and has the largest concentration of designated Cultural Properties in Japan. Although ravaged by wars, fires, and earthquakes during its eleven centuries as the imperial capital, Kyoto was spared from much of the destruction and danger of World War II. It was saved from the nearly universal firebombing of large cities in Japan in part to preserve it as the primary atomic bomb target. It was later removed from the atomic bomb target list by the personal intervention of Secretary of War Henry L. Stimson, as Stimson wanted to save this cultural center which he knew from a diplomatic visit in 1926. As a result, Nagasaki was then added as a target.

The 17 properties of the World Heritage Site originate from a period between the 10th century and the 19th century, and each is representative of the period in which it was built. The historical importance of the Kyoto region was taken into account by the UNESCO in the selection process.

== List of sites ==
The table lists information about each of the 17 listed properties of the World Heritage Site listing:

Name: in English and Japanese
Type: Purpose of the site. The list includes 13 Buddhist temples ("-ji"), 3 Shinto shrines ("-jinja"), and one castle ("-jo").
Period: time period of significance, typically of construction
Location: the site's location (by ward) and by geographic coordinates
Description: brief description of the site

Name	Image	Type	Period	Location	Description
Kamowakeikazuchi Shrine (賀茂別雷神社) a.k.a. Kamigamo Shrine (上賀茂神社)	CAPTION	Shinto shrine	7th century - early Heian period	Kita-ku, Kyoto, 35°03′37″N 135°45′10″E	One of the oldest Shinto shrines in Japan, one of the two Kamo-jinja, the traditionally linked Kamo shrines of Kyoto. The Kamo-jinja serve the function of protecting Kyoto from malign influences. The shrine is dedicated to the veneration of Kamo Wake-ikazuchi, the kami of thunder.
Kamomioya Shrine (賀茂御祖神社) a.k.a. Shimogamo Shrine (下鴨神社)	CAPTION	Shinto shrine	6th century - early Heian period	Sakyō-ku, Kyoto, 35°02′20″N 135°46′21″E	The second of the two Kamo-jinja, the traditionally linked Kamo shrines of Kyoto, which serve the function of protecting Kyoto from malign influences. The shrine is dedicated to the veneration of Tamayori-hime (玉依姫; lit., the spirit-inviting maiden) and her father, Kamo Taketsunomi (賀茂建角身).
Kyōōgokoku-ji (教王護国寺) a.k.a. Tō-ji (東寺)	CAPTION	Buddhist temple (Shingon)	8th century - Heian period	Sakyō-ku, Kyoto, 34°58′51.48″N 135°44′48.02″E	A Buddhist temple of the Shingon sect, it once had a partner, Sai-ji (West Temple) and, together, they stood alongside the Rashomon, gate to the Heian capital. It was formally known as Kyō-ō-gokoku-ji (教王護国寺 The Temple for the Defense of the Nation by Means of the King of Doctrines), which indicates that it previously functioned as a temple providing protection for the nation. The temple dates from 796, two years after the capital moved to Heian-kyō. Together with its partner Sai-ji, and the temple Shingon-in (located in the Heian Palace), it was one of only three Buddhist temples allowed in the capital at the time, and is the only of the three to survive to the present.
Kiyomizu-dera (清水寺)	Kiyomizudera	Buddhist Temple (Independent)	8th century - Heian period	Higashiyama-ku, Kyoto 34°59′42″N 135°47′06″E	Originally completed in 780, Kiyomizudera became an Imperial temple in 805. It has burned down and been reconstructed nine times, and most of the structures date from the 1630s. The main hall (Hondo) is built on a hillside, supported by massive wooden pillars and constructed without a single nail. The Hondo is a designated Japanese National Treasure; the complex is also home to 18 Japanese Important Cultural Properties
Enryaku-ji (延暦寺)	Enryakuji	Buddhist temple (Tendai)	8th century - Heian period	Ōtsu, Shiga 35°4′13.62″N 135°50′27.33″E	The temple was founded in 788 by Saicho, who introduced the Tendai sect of Mahayana Buddhism to Japan from China. At its peak in the 10th century, Enryaku-ji was a huge complex of as many as 3,000 sub-temples and a powerful army of warrior monks. The warlord Oda Nobunaga ended this Buddhist militancy in 1571 by attacking Enryaku-ji, leveling the buildings and slaughtering monks. The current structures date from the late 16th century to early 17th century and reflect Edo period details, but the main building (the Konponchudo, a National Treasure) was built in 887.
Daigo-ji (醍醐寺)	Daigo-ji	Buddhist temple (Shingon)	9th century - Heian period	Fushimi-ku, Kyoto, 34°57′3.57″N 135°49′10.51″E	Daigo-ji comprises two main areas: the upper portion (atop Mt. Daigo) and the lower, on the western slope. Six of the structures, including the main hall (Kondō) and its five-storied pagoda (Gojūnotō, completed in 952), are National Treasures. The temple possesses 12 other designated National Treasures, and the temple holds several dozen important cultural assets. The Sanbō-in Teien (garden), remodelled by Toyotomi Hideyoshi in 1598, is a Special Place of Scenic Beauty.
Ninna-ji (仁和寺)	Ninna-ji	Buddhist temple (Shingon)	9th century - Heian period	Ukyō-ku, Kyoto, 35°1′51.63″N 135°42′49.58″E	Construction of Ninna-ji was begun by Emperor Kōkō in 886, and completed in 888 by the Emperor Uda, who became a Buddhist priest and took up residence after his abdication in 897. From then until the Meiji restoration, temple's head priest was always of Imperial lineage. The temple was destroyed during the Ōnin War in 1467, and the present buildings date from its reconstruction in 1641–4. The Kondō (known as the "Golden Hall") was moved here from the Imperial Palace and is a National Treasure.
Byōdō-in (平等院)	Byodoin Phoenix Hall	Buddhist temple (jointly held by Jōdo shū and Tendai)	11th century - Heian period	Uji, Kyoto, 34°53′21.45″N 135°48′27.69″E	Originally an aristocratic villa in the nearby town of Uji, Kyoto, Byodoin became a Buddhist temple in 1052. The main hall (the Amida-dō, popularly known as Hōō-dō, or "Phoenix Hall") is the only remaining original building; the others were burnt down during a civil war in 1331. The Phoenix Hall and its garden, with its Chinese influence, was intended to represent Saiko-Gokurado-Jōdo (the Pure Land Paradise in the West).
Ujigami Shrine (宇治上神社)	Ujigami-jinja	Shinto shrine	11th century - Heian period	Uji, Kyoto, 34°53′31″N 135°48′41″E	The guardian shrine for the nearby Byōdō-in, and adjacent to Uji Shrine, Ujigami-jinja was originally built around 1060, making it the oldest original Shinto shrine in Japan. It is the oldest example of nagare-zukuri style of shrine architecture in Japan, where the three inner shrine structures are built side-by-side, with the structure in the middle being larger than those to the left and right.
Kōzan-ji (高山寺)	Kozan-ji	Buddhist temple (Shingon)	13th century - Kamakura period	Ukyō-ku, Kyoto, 35°3′36.39″N 135°40′42.85″E	Located in the mountains northwest of the Kyoto City, Kōzan-ji is in an ideal location for mountain asceticism. Some reports have the temple established in 774, but 1206 is verifiable; the temple has been destroyed numerous times by fire and war. The oldest extant building is Sekisui-in (石水院), which dates from the Kamakura Period (1185–1333), while others were rebuilt in 1634.
Saihō-ji (西芳寺) a.k.a. "Moss temple" (苔寺, Koke-dera)	Saihō-ji	Buddhist temple (Rinzai Zen)	8th century - Heian period	Nishikyō-ku, Kyoto, 34°59′31.06″N 135°40′59.93″E	The temple was primarily constructed to honor Amitabha, and is famed for its moss garden. Over 120 types of moss are present in the two-tiered garden, resembling a beautiful green carpet with many subtle shades. Saihō-ji was destroyed by fire during the Ōnin War and twice ravaged by floods during the Edo Period, but has since been rebuilt.
Rokuon-ji (鹿苑寺) a.k.a. Temple of the Golden Pavilion (金閣寺, Kinkaku-ji)	Kinkaku-ji	Buddhist temple (Rinzai Zen)	15th century - Muromachi period	Kita-ku, Kyoto, 35°2′21.85″N 135°43′45.71″E	Originally built in the Kamakura Period as an aristocrat's country estate, Rokuon-ji became a Buddhist temple in 1422. It is known especially for the Kinkaku (or "Golden Pavilion"), with its second and third floors entirely gilded with gold, epitomizing the so-called "Kitayama culture" of the period. The building was burned to the ground in 1950 by a monk later ruled mentally ill, and rebuilt 1955. The temple is also known for its beautiful gardens and pond, designed to incorporate nearby Mt. Kinugasayama into its scenery.
Ryōan-ji (竜安寺、龍安寺; The Temple of the Peaceful Dragon)	Ryōan-ji	Buddhist temple (Rinzai Zen of the Myōshinji school)	15th century - Muromachi period	Ukyō-ku, Kyoto, 35°2′4.18″N 135°43′5.71″E	Ryōan-ji's garden is considered one of the finest surviving examples of kare-sansui ("dry landscape"), a refined type of Japanese Zen temple garden design generally featuring distinctive larger rock formations arranged amidst a sweep of smooth pebbles raked into linear patterns that facilitate meditation. Originally an aristocrat's country villa, Ryoan-ji became a Zen temple in 1450. When its buildings were destroyed by fire in 1797, the Hojo of the Seigen-in, built in 1606, was relocated to Ryoan-ji and became the main hall of the temple.
Nishi Hongan-ji (西本願寺)	Nishi Hongan-ji	Buddhist temple (Jodo Shinshu )	16th century - Azuchi-Momoyama period	Shimogyō-ku, Kyoto, 34°59′31.37″N 135°45′5.81″E	One of two temple complexes in central Kyoto, Nishi Hongan-ji is the head temple of the Jodo Shinshu sect of Pure Land Buddhism. Initially founded in Kyoto's Higashiyama area in the 13th century, Hongwan-ji was moved to a succession of locations, and finally relocated in 1591 to its present site when Toyotomi Hideyoshi gave the land to the temple. Its gate known as Karamon (唐門) is designated a National Treasures of Japan.
Nijō Castle (二条城, Nijō-jō)	Nijō Castle	Castle	17th century - Edo period	Nakagyō-ku, Kyoto, 35°0′50.96″N 135°44′51.0″E	Nijō Castle was ordered built in 1601 by shōgun Tokugawa Ieyasu and completed during the reign of Tokugawa Iemitsu in 1626. The ornately decorated complex served as the Kyoto residence and reception hall for the Tokugawa Shōguns until 1867, when the last shōgun, Tokugawa Yoshinobu, used its Ninomaru Palace to declare the end of the shogunate and return authority to the Imperial Court. The castle became an Imperial detached palace until it was donated to the city of Kyoto in 1939.
Tenryū-ji (天龍寺)		Buddhist temple (Rinzai Zen of the Tenryū school)	14th century - Muromachi period	Ukyō-ku, Kyoto, 35°0′57.47″N 135°40′25.58″E	Tenryū-ji is the head temple of the Tenryū-ji branch of the Rinzai sect of Zen Buddhism. The temple was founded by Ashikaga Takauji in 1339.
Jishō-ji (慈照寺) a.k.a. Temple of the Silver Pavilion (銀閣寺, Ginkaku-ji)		Buddhist temple (Rinzai Zen)	15th century - Muromachi period	Sakyō-ku, Kyoto, 35°1′36.75″N 135°47′53.7″E	Ginkaku-ji (literally "Temple of the Silver Pavilion"), officially named Jishō-ji (literally "Temple of Shining Mercy"), was originally built to serve as a place of rest and solitude for the shōgun Ashikaga Yoshimasa. After his death, the villa and gardens became a Buddhist temple complex. Today it is associated with the Shokoku-ji branch of Rinzai Zen.

== See also ==
- List of World Heritage Sites in Japan
- Tourism in Japan
