= Ōmiwa Shrine (disambiguation) =

Ōmiwa Shrine (大神神社) refers to a number of related Shinto shrines in Japan dedicated to the kami Ōmononushi. It may refer to:

- Ōmiwa Shrine, the main shrine in Sakurai, Nara Prefecture (colloquially known as "Miwa Shrine")
- Ōmiwa Shrine (Ichinomiya) in Ichinomiya, Aichi Prefecture
- Ōmiwa Shrine (Tochigi) in Tochigi, Tochigi Prefecture

== See also ==
- Miwa Shrine (disambiguation)
