= Ōmiwa Shrine, Ichinomiya =

Shinto shrine in Ichinomiya, Japan

Ōmiwa Shrine 大神神社
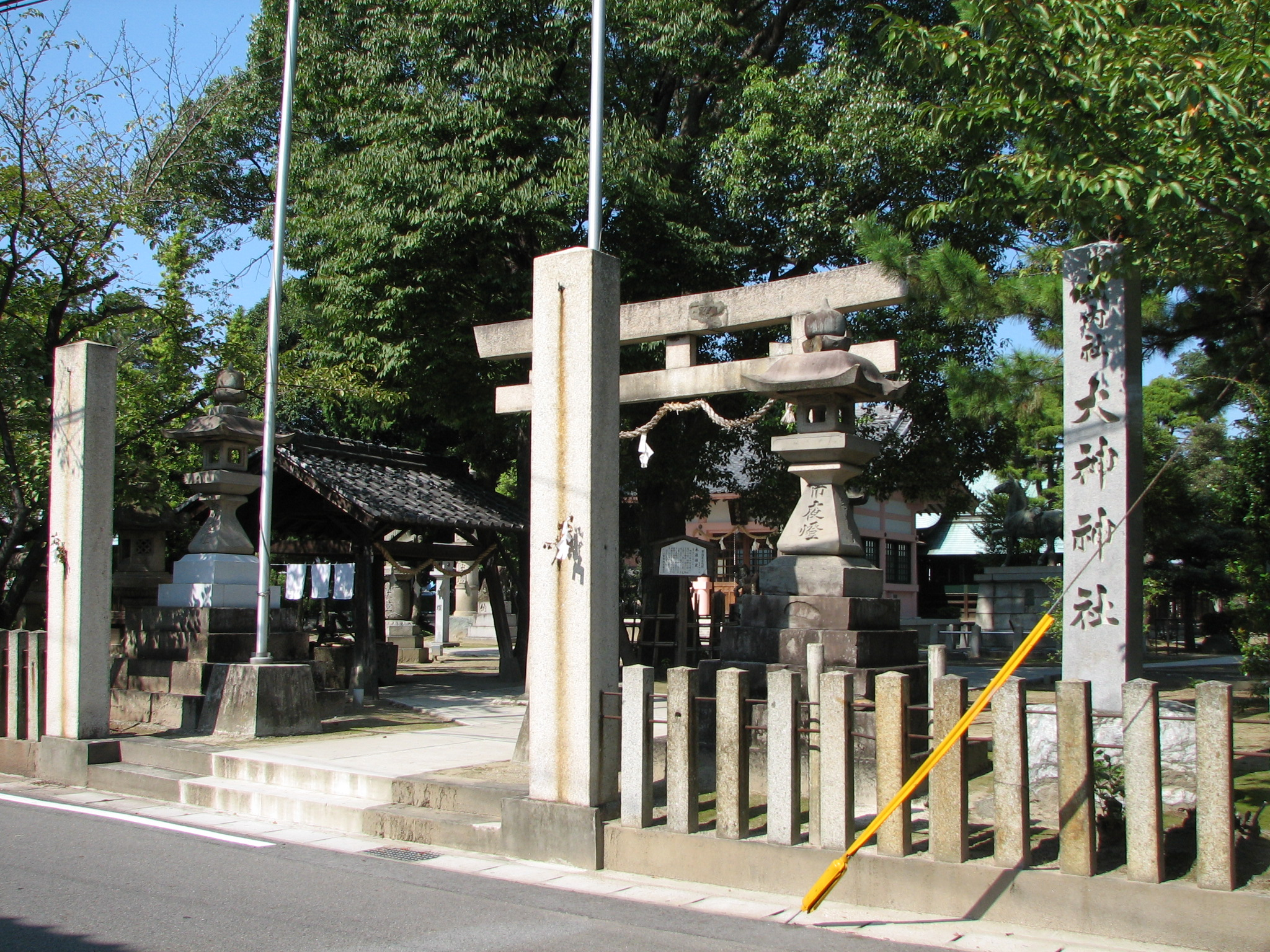
- Entrance to Ōmiwa Shrine

- Location within Japan

Religion
- Affiliation: Shinto
- Deity: Ōmononushi

Location
- Location: 2-15-28 Hanaike, Ichinomiya-shi, Aichi-ken
- Coordinates: 35°17′29″N 136°47′35″E

Ōmiwa Shrine (大神神社, Ōmiwa-jinja) is a Shinto shrine located in Ichinomiya, Aichi, Japan. The honden is built in the nagare-zukuri style.

== See also ==
- Ōmiwa Shrine
- Mount Miwa
- Ko-Shintō
