= Ujigami Shrine =

Shinto shrine in Kyoto Prefecture, Japan

Ujigami Shrine 宇治上神社
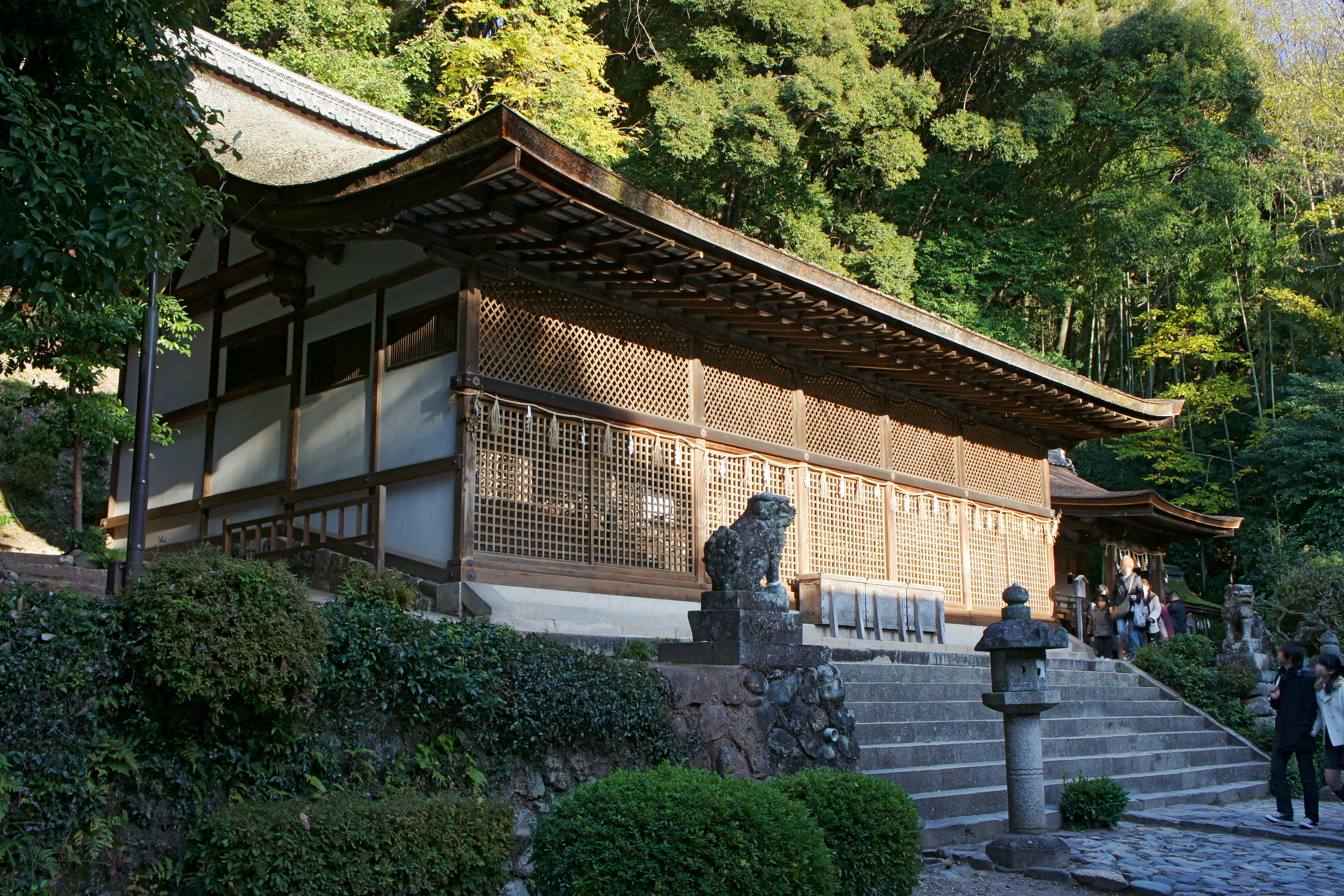
- Honden main hall of the Ujigami Shrine, a National Treasure of Japan

- Location within Japan

Religion
- Affiliation: Shinto
- Deity: Emperor Ōjin; Uji no Wakiiratsuko; Emperor Nintoku
- Type: Minor shikinaisha

Location
- Location: 59 Ujiyamada, Uji, Kyoto, Kyoto Prefecture, Japan
- Interactive map of Ujigami Shrine 宇治上神社
- Coordinates: 34°53′31″N 135°48′41″E

Architecture
- Established: 11th century

Ujigami Shrine (宇治上神社, Ujigami-jinja) is a Shinto shrine in the city of Uji, Kyoto Prefecture, Japan. The shrine was built as a guardian shrine for the nearby Byōdō-in, and is adjacent to the Uji Shrine. In 1994, it was registered as a UNESCO World Heritage Site as one of the "Historic Monuments of Ancient Kyoto". The honden and haiden have been designated by the Agency for Cultural Affairs as National Treasures in the category shrines.

Ujigami Shrine is dedicated to the Emperor Ōjin and his sons, the imperial princes Uji no Wakiiratsuko and Emperor Nintoku. Uji no Wakiiratsuko committed suicide to solve a dispute over the imperial succession, and the shrine was built in his honor.

The honden of Ujigami Shrine is known as the oldest example of nagare-zukuri style of shrine architecture in Japan. In this style of architecture the three inner shrine structures are built side-by-side, with the structure in the middle being larger than those to the left and right. The honden dates to the late Heian period (794 – 1185). The haiden is built in the shinden-zukuri style, and its roof in the sugaruhafu style. The haiden dates to the Kamakura period (1185 – 1333). The Kasuga Shrine, also within the shrine precinct, dates to the same period. The shrine is noted for its freshwater spring.

Ujigami Shrine was found via digital dendrochronology to be the oldest original Shinto shrine in Japan. The Nara Research Institute for Cultural Properties determined that the shrine was built in approximately 1060, which closely matches the written account of the founding of the shrine.

Until the Meiji Period (1868 – 1912) the Uji Shrine and Ujigami Shrine were collectively known as the Rikyukamisha. The annual festival of Ujigami Shrine is held on May 5.

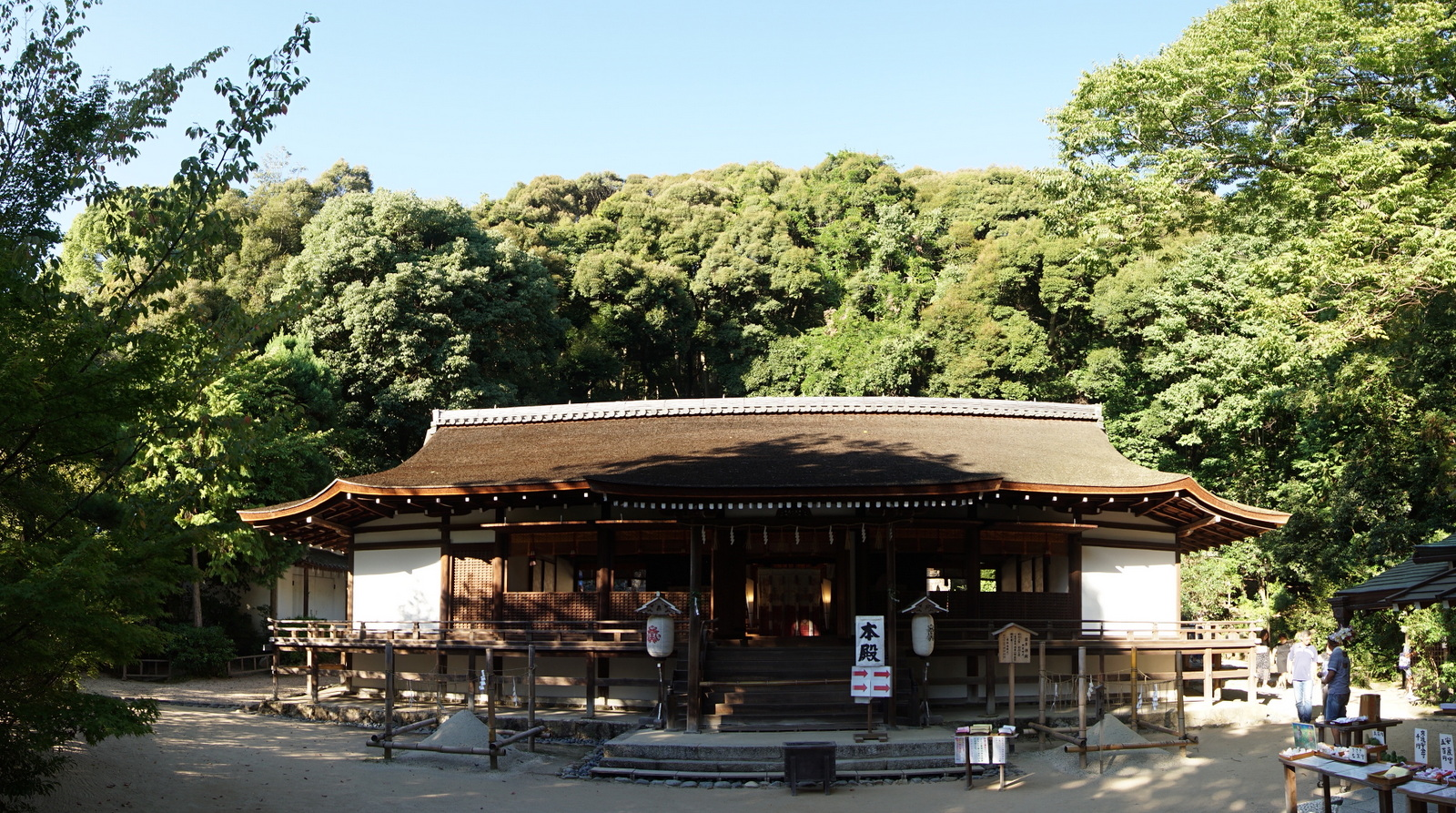
Ujigami shrine

== See also ==
- Uji Shrine
- Historic Monuments of Ancient Kyoto
- Byōdō-in
