= Miwa Shrine (Gifu) =

Shinto shrine in Gifu Prefecture, Japan

Miwa Shrine 三輪神社
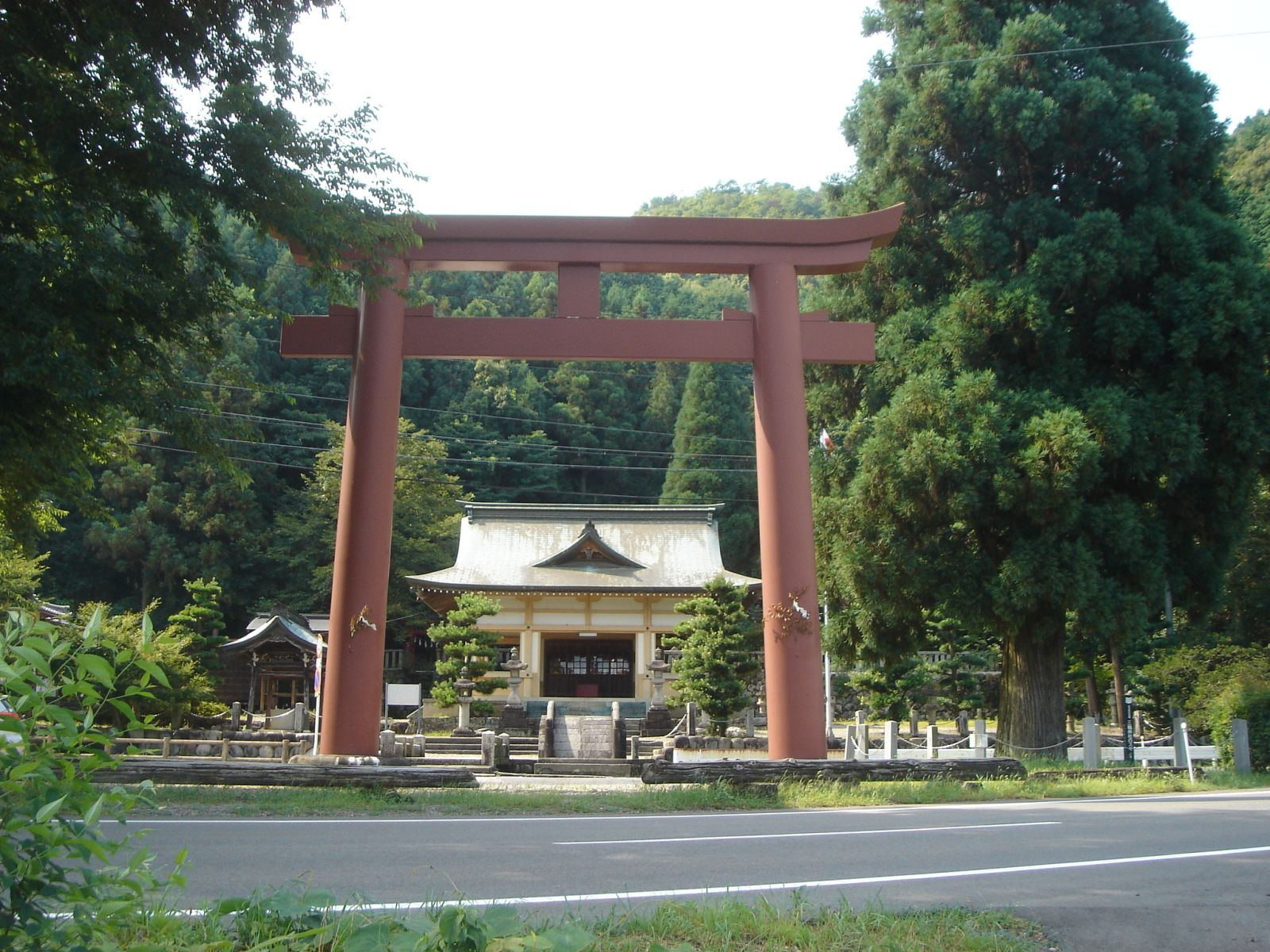
- Torii gate and honden

- Location within Japan

Religion
- Affiliation: Shinto
- Deity: Ōmononushi

Location
- Location: 2-15-28 Miwa, Gifu-shi, Gifu-ken
- Coordinates: 35°30′17.58″N 136°50′50.09″E

Miwa Shrine (三輪神社, Miwa-jinja) is a Shinto shrine located in Gifu, Gifu Prefecture, Japan.

== Gallery ==
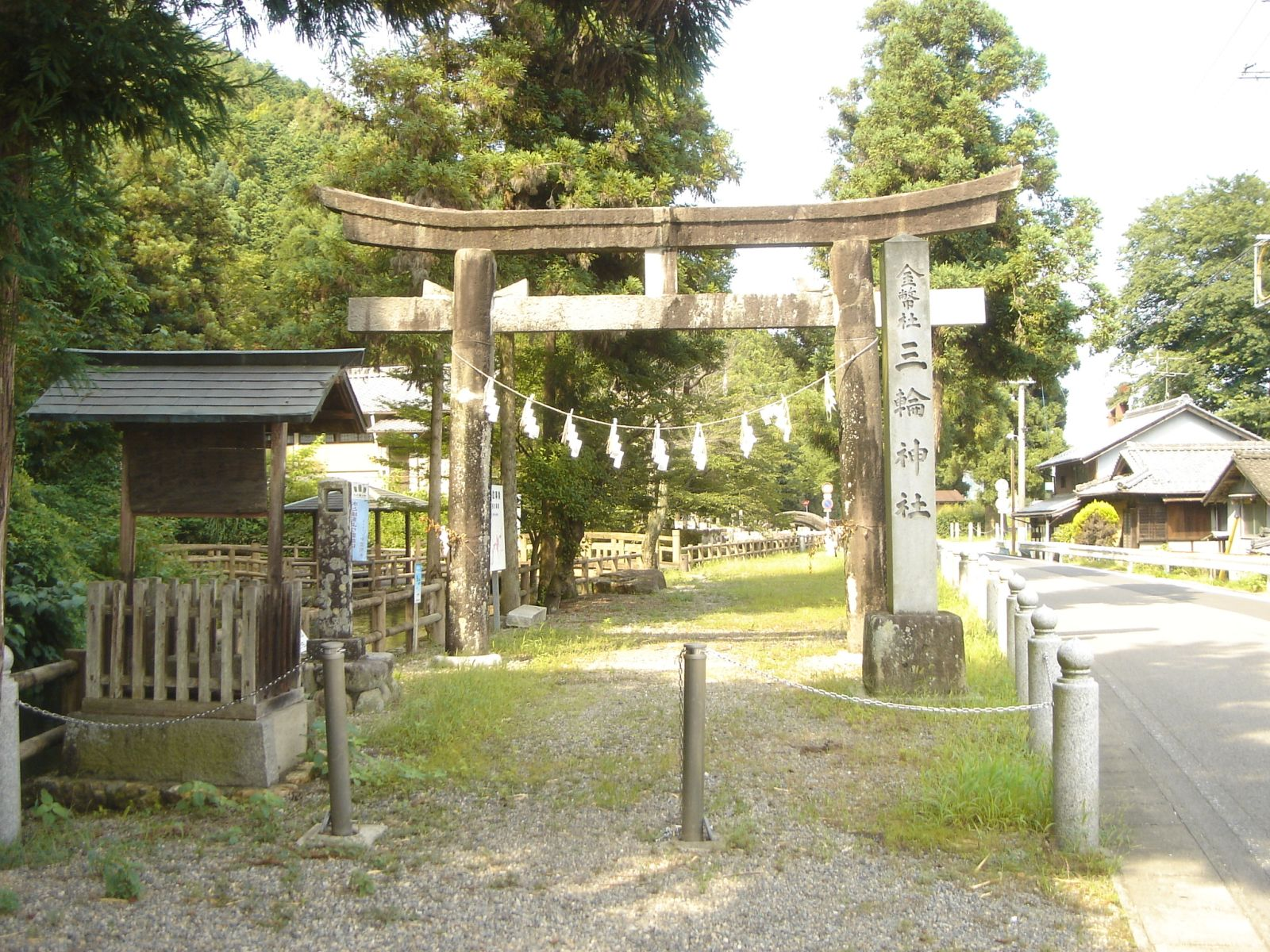
Torii

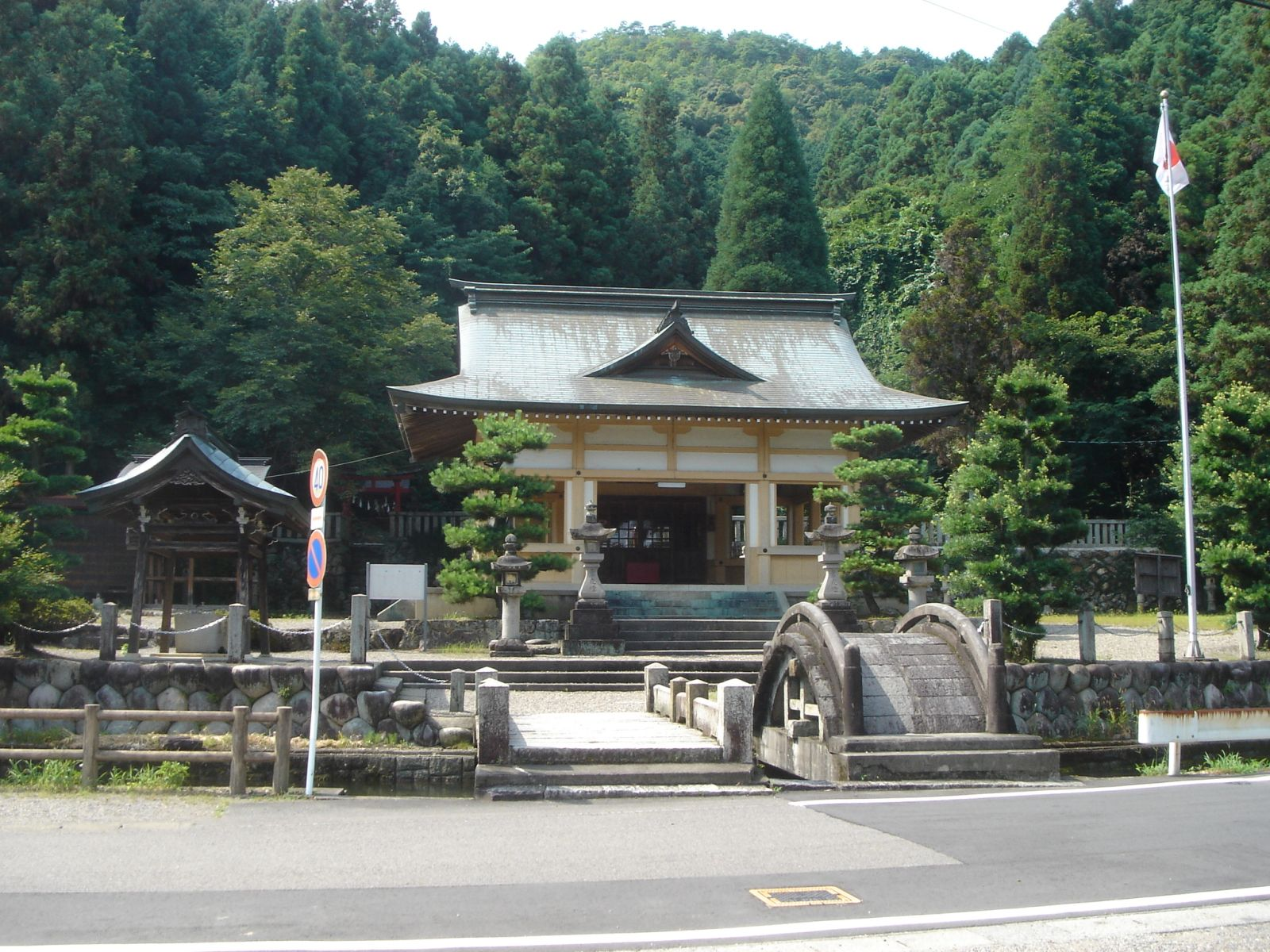

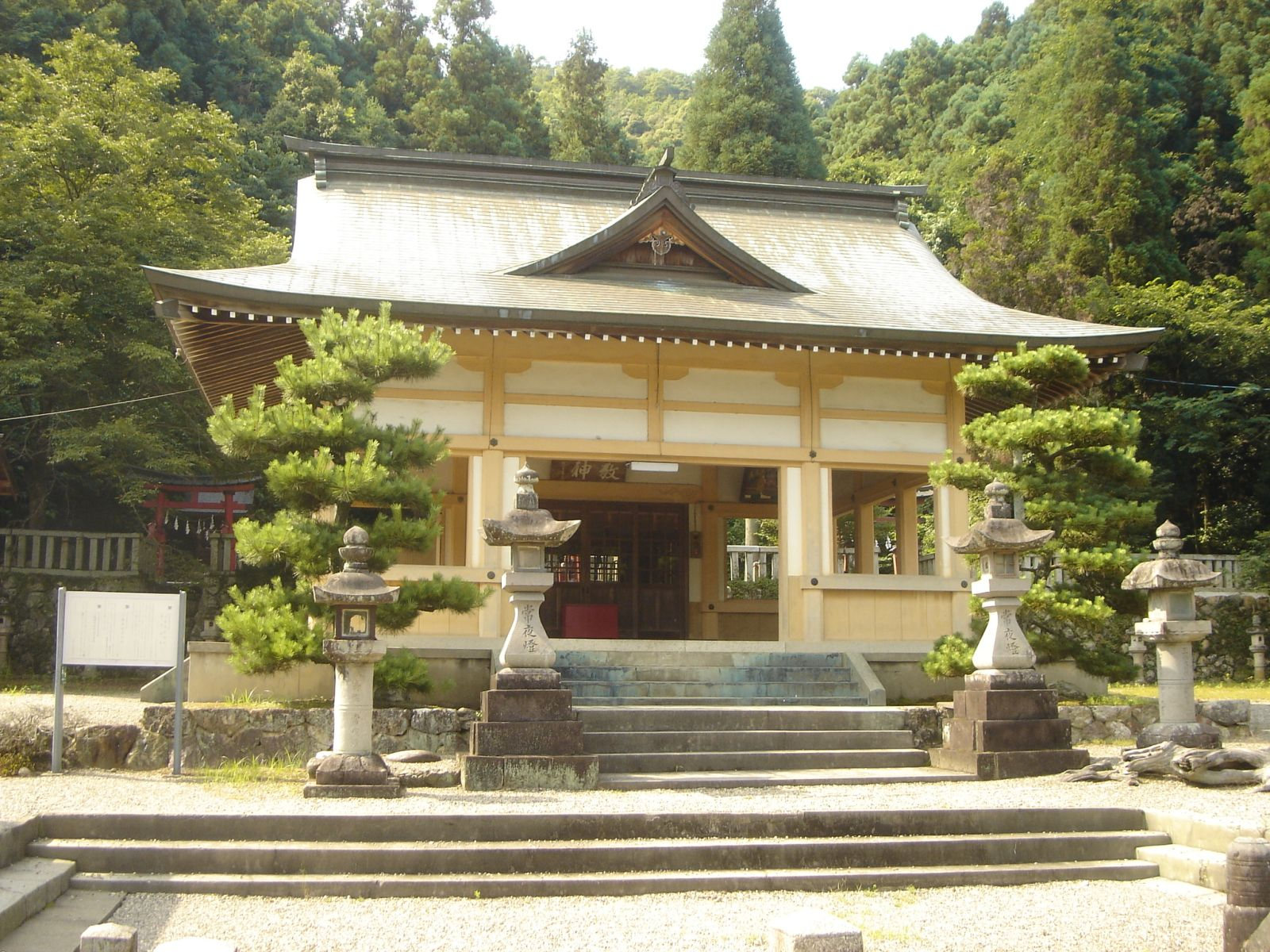
Main hall

== See also ==
- Ōmiwa Shrine
- Mount Miwa
