= Nagare-zukuri =

Shinto shrine architectural style

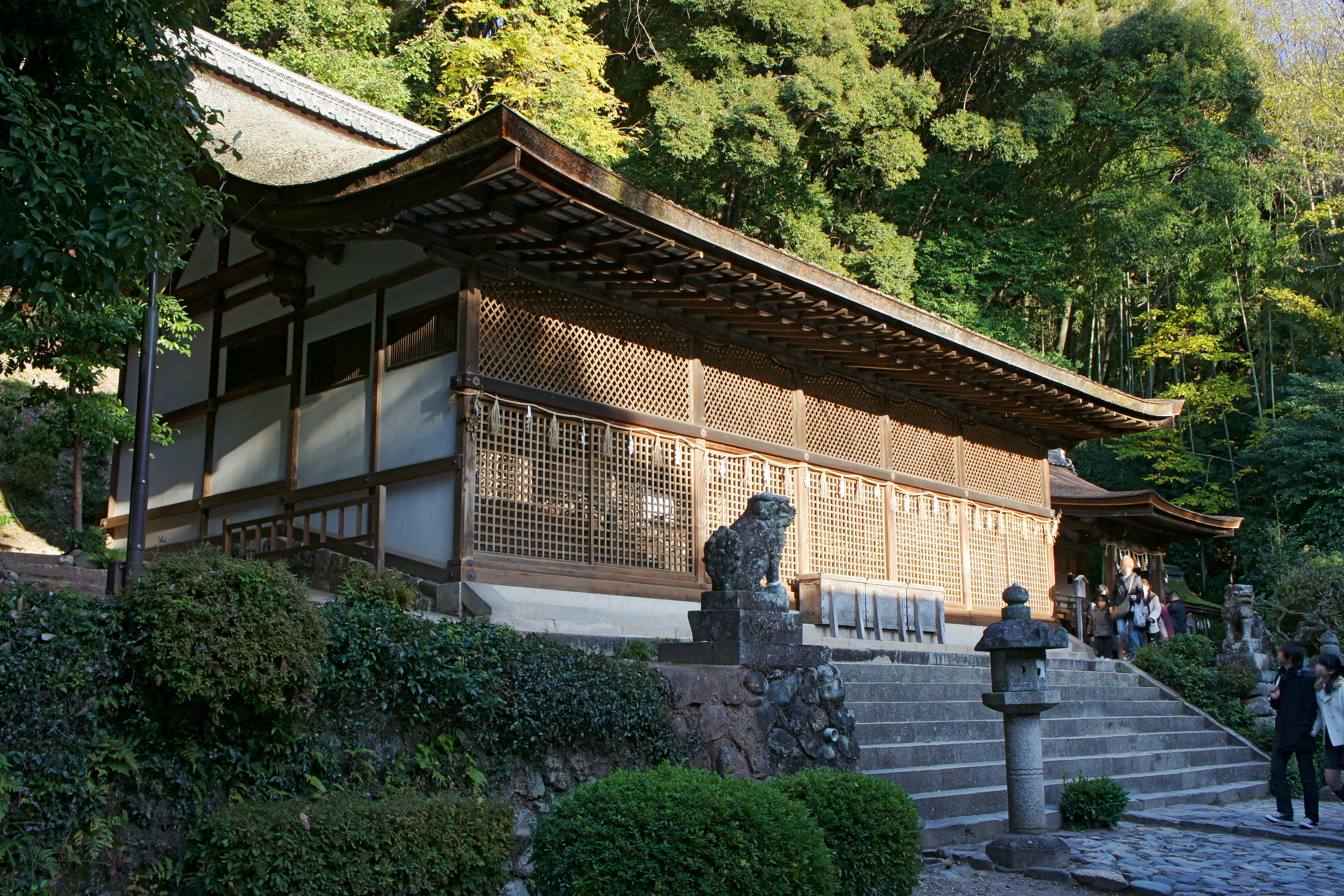
Ujigami Shrine in Uji, Kyoto Prefecture

The nagare-zukuri (流造, streamlined roof style) or nagare hafu-zukuri (流破風造, streamlined gabled style) is a traditional Shinto shrine architectural style characterized by a very asymmetrical gabled roof (kirizuma-yane (切妻屋根)) projecting outwards on one of the non-gabled sides, above the main entrance, to form a portico (see photo). This is the feature which gives it its name. It is the most common style among shrines all over the country. That the building has its main entrance on the side which runs parallel to the roof's ridge (non gabled-side) makes it belong to the hirairi or hirairi-zukuri (平入・平入造) style.

== Design ==
Sometimes its basic layout, consisting of an elevated core (母屋, moya) partially surrounded by a veranda called hisashi (all under the same roof), is modified by the addition of a room in front of the entrance. A nagare-zukuri honden (sanctuary) varies in roof ridge length from 1 to 11 ken, but is never 6 or 8 ken. The most common sizes are 1 and 3 ken. The oldest shrine in Japan, Uji's Ujigami Shrine, has a honden of this type. Its external dimensions are 5x3 ken, but internally it is composed of three sanctuaries (内殿, naiden) measuring 1 ken each.

== Variation ==
=== Ryōnagare-zukuri ===
Ryōnagare-zukuri (両流造, double streamlined roof style) is an evolution of the nagare-zukuri in which the roof flows down to form a portico on both non-gabled sides. Examples are the honden at Itsukushima Shrine and that at Matsunoo-taisha in Kyoto.

=== Kasuga-zukuri and nagare-zukuri ===
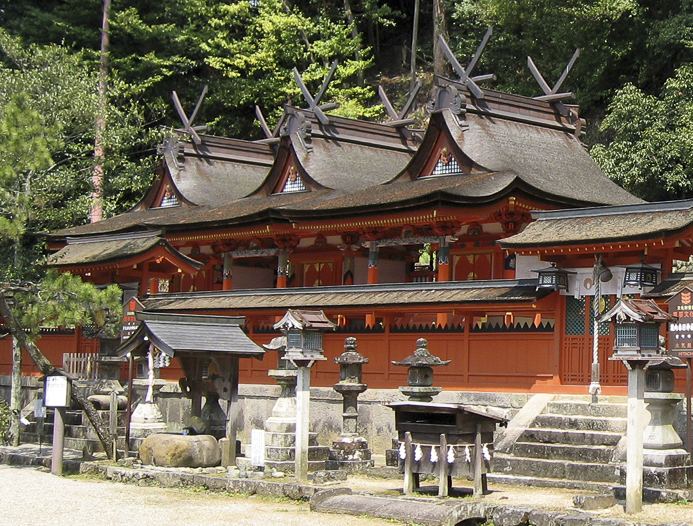
The honden at Uda Mikumari Shrine Kami-gū is made of three joined Kasuga-zukuri units.

While superficially completely different, the nagare-zukuri style actually shares an ancestry with the second most popular style in Japan, the kasuga-zukuri.

The two for example share pillars set over a double-cross-shaped foundation and a roof which extends over the main entrance, covering a veranda. (The Kasuga-zukuri is the only tsumairi style to possess this last feature.) The foundation's configuration is typical not of permanent, but of temporary shrines, built to be periodically moved. This shows that, for example, both the nagare-zukuri Kamo Shrine and Kasuga Taisha used to be dedicated to a mountain cult, and that they had to be moved to follow the movements of the kami.

The styles also share a veranda in front of the main entrance, which makes it likely they both evolved from a simple gabled roof.

== See also ==
- Glossary of Shinto
