= Uji Shrine =

Shinto shrine in Kyoto Prefecture, Japan

Uji Shrine 宇治神社
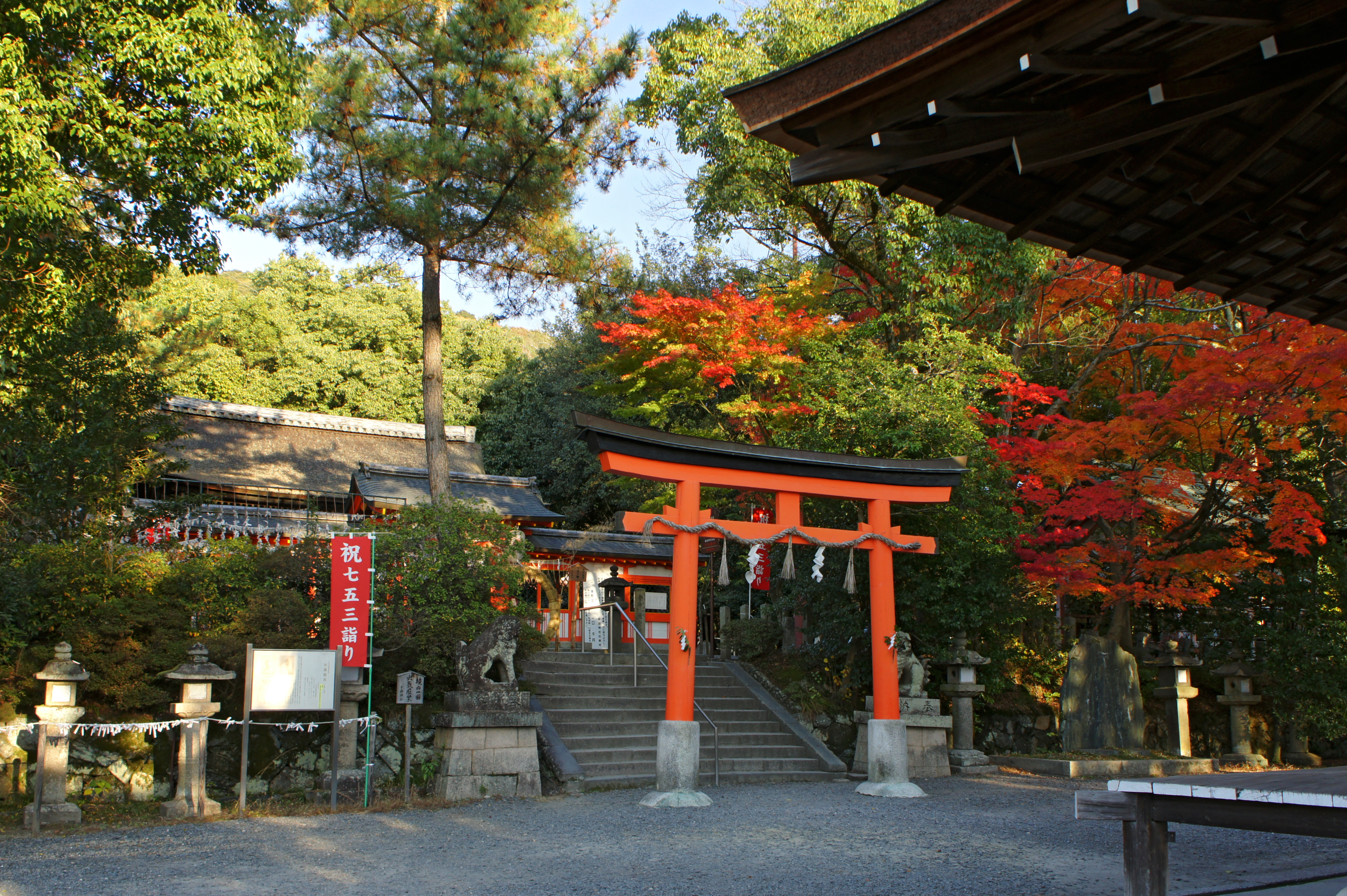

- Location within Japan

Religion
- Affiliation: Shinto

Location
- Interactive map of Uji Shrine 宇治神社
- Coordinates: 34°53′28″N 135°48′38″E

Uji Shrine (宇治神社, Uji-jinja) is a Shinto shrine located in the city of Uji in Kyoto Prefecture, Japan. It is adjacent to the Ujigami Shrine.
