= Kamiumi =

Birth of the gods in Japanese mythology

In Japanese mythology, the story of the birth of the gods (神産み, Kamiumi) occurs after the creation of Japan (Kuniumi). It concerns the birth of the divine (kami) descendants of Izanagi and Izanami.

== Story ==
According to the Kojiki, various kami were born from the relationship between Izanagi and Izanami until the fire kami, Kagutsuchi, incinerated Izanami's genitals upon birth and wounded her fatally. Izanagi, after witnessing the death of his beloved wife, unsheathed Ame no Ōhabari in his rage and beheaded Kagutsuchi. Several kami were born from the blood and body parts of Kagutsuchi. Subsequently, Izanagi went to the land of Yomi to find Izanami, however when he found her, she had become a maggot-infested rotting corpse and from her body parts other kami had emerged, causing the escape of Izanagi back to Ashihara no Nakatsukuni. Afterwards Izanagi performed Misogi, through which even more kami were born. The last of these are the three most important kami of Shinto: Amaterasu, kami of the sun; Tsukuyomi, kami of the moon; and Susanoo, kami of the seas and storms.

=== Birth of the kami ===
Gods born from Izanagi and Izanami and their descendants.

After having birthed Ōyashima and other islands during the creation of Japan, Izanagi and Izanami wanted to birth kami that would inhabit these islands, among them were household deities, (Note: Despite the existence of the Japanese article, Katakurokushin (家宅六神) usually refers to Chinese deities and extending the term to Japanese kami has no long history or has any appreciably wide acceptance.) as well as deities of the wind, trees and meadows, all born spontaneously:

1. Ōgotooshio (大事忍男神), (Note: Chamberlain: Ohokotooshio) male kami
2. Iwatsuchihiko (石土毘古神), (Note: Chamberlain: Ihatsuchibiko) male kami
3. Iwasuhime (石巣比売神), female kami
4. Ōtohiwake (大戸日別神), male kami
5. Ame no Fukio (天之吹男神), male kami
6. Ōyabiko (大屋毘古神), male kami
7. Kazamotsuwakenooshio (風木津別之忍男神), male kami
8. Ōwatatsumi (大綿津見神), male kami
9. Hayaakitsuhiko (速秋津日子神), male kami
10. Hayaakitsuhime (速秋津比売神), female kami
  From the relationship between Hayaakitsuhiko and Hayaakitsuhime the following kami were born:
  1. Awanagi (沫那藝神), male kami
  2. Awanami (沫那美神), female kami
  3. Tsuranagi (頬那藝神), male kami
  4. Tsuranami (頬那美神), female kami
  5. Ame no Mikumari (天之水分神), female kami
  6. Kuni no Mikumari (国之水分神), female kami
  7. Ame no Kuizamochi (天之久比奢母智神), male kami
  8. Kuni no Kuizamochi (国之久比奢母智神), male kami
11. Shinatsuhiko (志那都比古神), male kami
12. Kukunochi (久久能智神), male kami
13. Ōyamatsumi (大山津見神), male kami
14. Kayanohime (鹿屋野比売神), female kami
  From the relationship between Ōyamatsumi and Kayanohime the following kami were born:
  1. Ame no Sazuchi (天之狭土神), genderless kami
  2. Kuni no Sazuchi (国之狭土神), genderless kami
  3. Ame no Sagiri (天之狭霧神), genderless kami
  4. Kuni no Sagiri (国之狭霧神), genderless kami
  5. Ame no Kurado (天之闇戸神), genderless kami
  6. Kuni no Kurado (国之闇戸神), genderless kami
  7. Ōtomatohiko (大戸惑子神), male kami
  8. Ōtomatohime (大戸惑女神), female kami
15. Toriiwakusufune (鳥之石楠船神), also known as Ame no Torifune (天鳥船) (Note: Probably also a boat; ridden by Takemikazuchi) - male kami
16. Ōgetsuhime (大宜都比売神), (Note: Chamberlain: Ohogetsuhime) female kami, Goddess of food.
17. Hiyagihayao (火之夜藝速男神) = Kagutsuchi, male kami, God of fire.

Gods born during the agony and death of Izanami.

During Kagutsuchi's birth, Izanami's genitals were burned and she was mortally wounded. In her agony, from her vomit, urine and feces more kami were born.

1. Kanayamahiko (金山毘古神), male kami born from the vomit and feces of Izanami
2. Kanayamahime (金山毘売神), female kami born from the vomit and feces of Izanami
3. Haniyasuhiko (波邇夜須毘古神), male kami born from the feces of Izanami
4. Haniyasuhime (波邇夜須毘売神) , female kami born from the feces of Izanami
5. Mizuhanome (彌都波能売神) = Mizuhanome (Kami of water), female kami born from the urine of Izanami
6. Wakumusubi (和久産巣日神), (Note: Chamberlain:Wakumusuhi) male kami born from the urine of Izanami

Wakumusubi had a daughter:
1. Toyoukehime (豊宇気毘売神), female kami

=== Death of Kagutsuchi ===
After the agony, Izanami died. At the time Izanagi crawled around the body mourning his beloved wife's death. From his tears, the female kami Nakisawame (泣沢女神) was born. Subsequently, Izanagi buried Izanami on Mount Hiba. His sadness turned into anger as he killed Kagutsuchi with a Totsuka no Tsurugi called Ame no Ōhabari (天之尾羽張) also known as Itsu no Ōhabari.

From the blood of Kagutsuchi the following kami emerged:

1. Iwasaku (石折神) (Note: Chamberlain: Ihasaku)
2. Nesaku (根折神) - Minor Star God.
3. Iwatsunoo (石筒之男神)
  The kami above were born from the blood that fell from the tip of the sword in the rocks.
4. Mikahayahi (甕速日神)
5. Hihayahi (樋速日神)
6. Takemikazuchi (建御雷之男神)
  The kami above were born from the blood that fell from the blade of the sword.
7. Kuraokami (闇淤加美神)
8. Kuramitsuha (闇御津羽神)
  The kami above were born from the blood that fell from the handle of the sword.

Also, from the body of Kagutsuchi the following kami were born:

1. Masakayamatsumi (建御雷之男), emerged from Kagutsuchi's head;
2. Odoyamatsumi (淤縢山津見神), from the chest;
3. Okuyamatsumi (奥山津見神), from the abdomen;
4. Kurayamatsumi (闇山津見神), from the genitals;
5. Shigiyamatsumi (志藝山津見神), from the left arm;
6. Hayamatsumi (羽山津見神), from the right arm;
7. Harayamatsumi (原山津見神), from the left foot;
8. Toyamatsumi (戸山津見神), from the right foot.

=== Land of Yomi ===
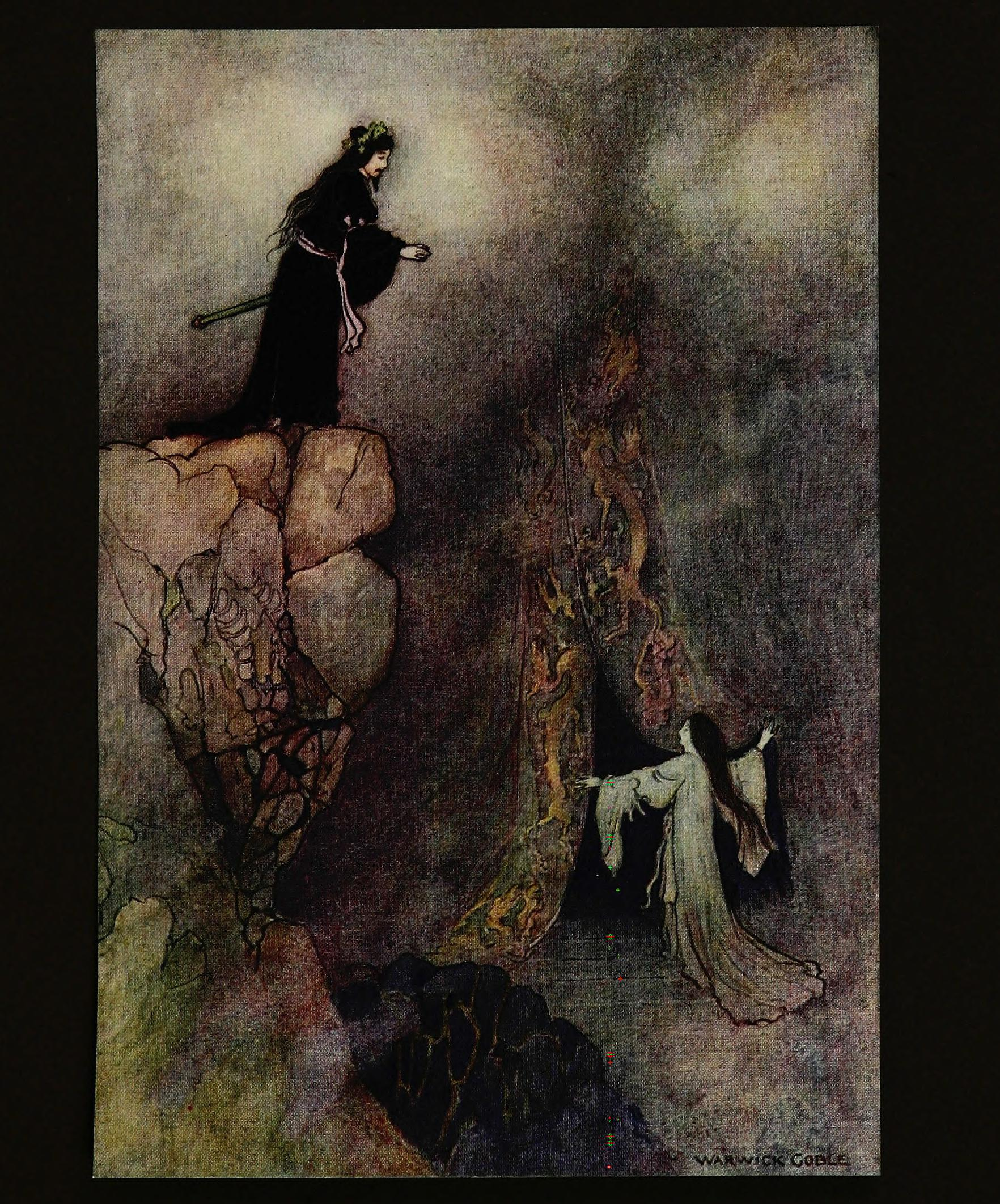

Izanagi felt that he wanted to bring back Izanami and so travels to Yomi (黄泉). Travelling through the path to that world, he met Izanami and said to her:

The countries that you and I have created have not been completed yet. Let us return! (Note: 「あなたと一緒に創った国土はまだ完成していません。帰りましょう。」. Kojiki)

Izanami replied:

Too bad you did not come before, for I have eaten in the country of Yomi! [By eating food in the land of Yomi, one ends up stuck being a resident of Yomi. This concept is called, "Yomotsu Hegui (黄泉戸喫)."] ... however, I will consult with the kami of Yomi. Under no circumstances you may look at me! (Note: 「黄泉の国の食べ物を食べてしまったので、生き返ることはできません」「黄泉神と相談しましょう。お願いですから、私の姿は見ないで下さいね。」. Kojiki)

After saying this, Izanami went to speak with the kami of Yomi. However, much time passed and she did not return which made Izanagi begin to despair. So he broke one of the tines of his ornamental comb mizura that he wore in the left bun of his hair, lit it in order to see better and then decided to travel deeper. He manages to find Izanami but is horrified to see that she has become a rotting corpse, infested with maggots. Of her body were born the eight kami of thunder, which were:

1. Ōikazuchi (大雷), from the head of Izanami;
2. Honoikazuchi (火雷), from her chest;
3. Kuroikazuchi (黒雷), from her abdomen;
4. Sakuikazuchi (折雷), from her genitals;
5. Wakaikazuchi (若雷), from her left arm;
6. Tsuchiikazuchi (土雷), from her right arm;
7. Naruikazuchi (鳴雷), from her left foot;
8. Fusuikazuchi (伏雷), from her right foot.

Izanagi, afraid, wanted to return home, but Izanami was embarrassed by his appearance and commanded the Yomotsu Shikome (黄泉丑女) to chase Izanagi. In his escape, he took his headband, and threw it to the ground, where it turned into a grape cluster. The Yomotsu Shikome started to eat them, but kept chasing the fleeing Izanagi. So he broke the tine of the comb that he wore in his right bun, and as he threw it to the ground, it became bamboo shoots, prompting the Yomotsu Shikome to eat them, and enabling Izanagi to flee.

However, Izanami released the eight kami of thunder and 1500 warriors from Yomi to continue the pursuit. Izanagi drew out his Totsuka no Tsurugi and brandished it behind himself to continue the escape. As they pursued him, Izanagi reached Yomotsu Hirasaka (黄泉比良坂), the border between Yomi and Ashihara no Nakatsukuni (葦原中国). He took three peaches that were there and, waiting for his pursuers, attacked them with it which caused them to flee.

Izanagi commented:

Assistance to all people when they are tired and face difficulties. (Note: 「人々が困っている時に助けてくれ」. Kojiki)

The kami of these peaches was called Ōkamuzumi (意富加牟豆美命).

Finally, Izanami herself came after Izanagi, but he lifted a boulder that would take a thousand men to lift and used it to block the border. At that moment, their eyes met for the last time. Izanami said, "If you behave in this way, I will strangle and kill one thousand men of your land in one day!" (Note: 「私はこれから毎日、一日に千人ずつ殺そう」. Kojiki)

Izanagi replied, "If you do this, I will in one day set up 1,500 parturition houses. So in one day indeed 1,000 men will die and indeed 1,500 are going to be born." (Note: 「それなら私は人間が決して滅びないよう、一日に千五百人生ませよう」. Kojiki)

These words justified the circle of life and death in humans. For the same reason, Izanami is also called Yomotsu Ōkami (黄泉津大神) or Chishiki Ōkami (道敷大神) and the boulder that obstructs the path to Yomi is known as Chigaeshi Ōkami (道返之大神) or Yomido Ōkami (黄泉戸大神).

=== Purification of Izanagi ===
Gods that emerged during the purification of Izanagi.

Leaving Yomi, Izanagi decided to remove all kegare in his body through performing misogi near Awagihara at the Tachibana river in Himuka of Tsukushi. As he took off his clothes and accessories, the following twelve kami were born:

1. Tsukitatsufunado (衝立船戸神) – Post at the Road Bend, emerges from the staff.
2. Michinagachiha (道之長乳歯神) – Long Winding Way Stones, from the obi.
3. Tokihakashi (時量師神) – Time Keeper Loosed, from the sack.
4. Wazurainoushi (和豆良比能宇斯能神) – Master Miasma, (Note: Chamberlain: Wazurahinoushi) from the robe.
5. Chimata (道俣神) – Road Fork, from the hakama.
6. Akiguinoushi (飽咋之宇斯能神) – Master Filled Full, from the crown.
7. Okizakaru (奥疎神) – Beyond Offshore, from the armbands of the left hand.
8. Okitsunagisahiko (奥津那芸佐毘古神) – Offshore Surf Lad, from the armbands of the left hand.
9. Okitsukaibera (奥津甲斐弁羅神) – Offshore Tide Lad, (Note: Chamberlain: Okitsukahibera) from the armbands of the left hand.
10. Hezakaru (辺疎神) – Beyond Shoreside, from the armbands of the right hand.
11. Hetsunagisahiko (辺津那芸佐毘古神) – Shoreside Surf Lad, from the armbands of the right hand.
12. Hetsukaibera (辺津甲斐弁羅神) – Shoreside Tide Lad, from the armbands of the right hand.

Afterwards, Izanagi became purified of the kegare from Yomi. At this moment, two kami were born:

1. Yasomagatsuhi (八十禍津日神), male kami
2. Ōmagatsuhi (大禍津日神), male kami

Then, to rectify these two, three kami were born:

1. Kamunaobi (神直毘神), male kami
2. Ōnaobi (大直毘神), male kami
3. Izunome (伊豆能売), female kami

Then, when washing with water the lower parts of his body, two kami were born;

1. Sokotsuwatatsumi (底津綿津見神), male kami
2. Sokotsutsunoo (底筒之男神), male kami

When washing the middle parts of his body, two more kami were born:

1. Nakatsuwatatsumi (中津綿津見神), male kami
2. Nakatsutsunoo (中筒之男神), male kami

Finally, washing the upper parts of his body, again two more kami were born:

1. Uwatsuwatatsumi (上津綿津見神), (Note: Chamberlain: Uhatsuwatatsumi) male kami
2. Uwatsutsunoo (上筒之男神), male kami

The trio of Sokotsuwatatsumi, Nakatsuwatatsumi and Uwatsuwatatsumi make up the triad of deities called Watatsumi Sanjin (綿津見三神). The trio of Sokotsutsunoo, Nakatsutsunoo and Uwatsutsunoo make up the triad of deities called Sumiyoshi Sanjin (住吉三神).

In the last segment of his purification, Izanagi washed his left eye from which the female kami Amaterasu Ōmikami (天照大御神) was born; then he washed his right eye from which the male kami Tsukuyomi no Mikoto (月読命) was born; after which he washed his nose from which the male kami Takehayasusanoo no Mikoto (建速須佐之男命) = Susanoo was born.

These three are known as Mihashirauzumiko (三貴子), and Izanagi ordered their investiture. Amaterasu received the mandate to govern Takamagahara (高天原) and a necklace of magatama called Mikuratana (御倉板挙之神) from Izanagi. Tsukuyomi was commanded to manage Yoru no Osukuni (夜之食国), and Susanoo was told to rule Unabara (海原).
