= Nakisawame =

Japanese mythological figure

Nakisawame (Japanese: ナキサワメ; recorded in the Kojiki as 泣沢女神 and in the Nihon Shoki as 啼沢女命, sometimes also written as 哭沢女命) is a female kami in Japanese mythology. Her name means "crying weeping female".

During the myth of the Birth of the Gods, in which the goddess Izanami died after giving birth to the fire deity Kagu-tsuchi, Izanagi clung to his wife's dead body and cried. From his tears, Nakisawame emerged. She is considered a spirit of spring water.

According to the Shinto creation myth, she lives at the foot of Mount Kagu. In the Kojiki she is also named "Kaguyama-no-uneo-no-konoshita-ni-zasu-kami" (香山（かぐやま）の畝尾の木の下に坐す神). The engishiki jinmyōchō (延喜式神名帳) mentions the Uneotsu-Tamoto shrine (畝尾都多本神社, uneotsu-tamoto jinja), located in Kinomoto, Kashihara, Nara, nicknamed Nakisawa shrine (哭沢神社), in which Nakisawame is enshrined.
