= Kuniumi =

Japanese creation myth

In Japanese mythology, Kuniumi (国産み; literally "birth or formation of the country") is the traditional and legendary history of the emergence of the Japanese archipelago, of islands, as narrated in the Kojiki and Nihon Shoki. According to this legend, after the creation of Heaven and Earth (Tenchi-kaibyaku), the gods Izanagi and Izanami were given the task of forming a series of islands that would become what is now Japan. In Japanese mythology, these islands make up the known world. The creation of Japan is followed by the creation of the gods (Kamiumi).

== Creation story ==
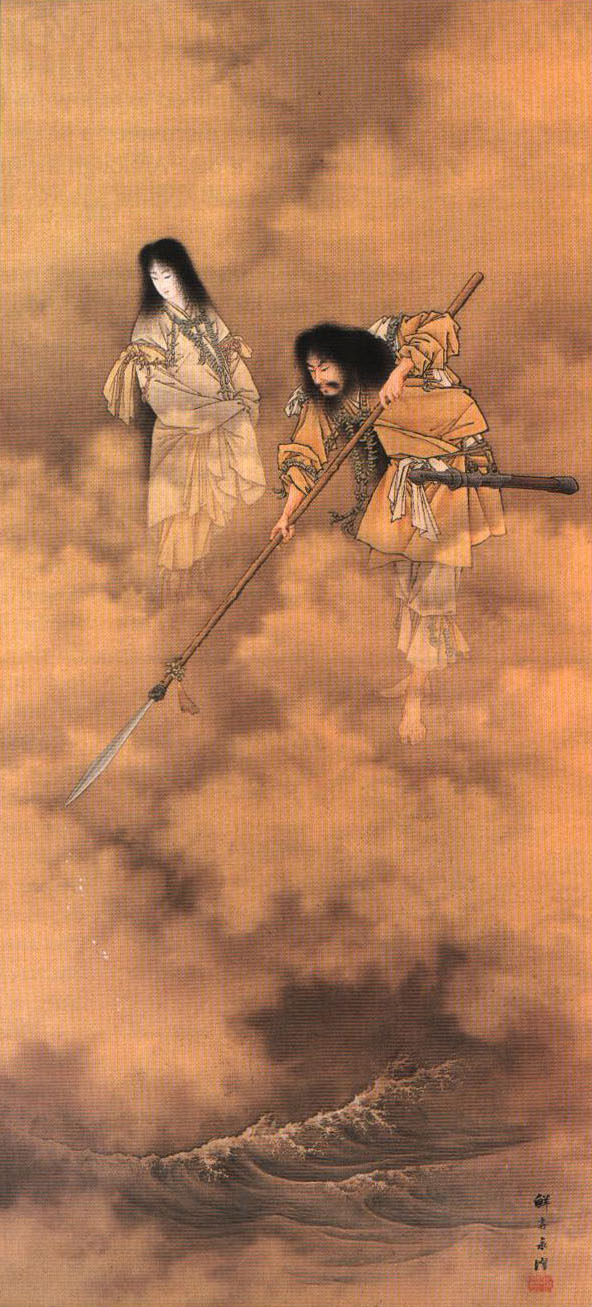
Izanagi (right) and Izanami (left) consolidating the earth with the spear Ama-no-Nuboko. Painting by Eitaku Kobayashi (Meiji period)

=== According to the Kojiki ===
After the formation, Heaven was above and Earth was still a drifting soft mush. The first five gods named Kotoamatsukami (別天津神; "Separate Heavenly Deities") were lone deities without sex and did not reproduce. Then came the Kamiyonanayo (神世七代; "The Seven Divine Generations"), consisting of two lone deities followed by five couples. The elder gods delegated the youngest couple Izanagi and Izanami to carry out their venerable mandate: to reach down from heaven and give solid form to the earth.

This they did with the use of a precious stone-covered spear named Ame-no-nuboko (天沼矛; "heavenly jewelled spear"), given to them by the elders. Standing over the Ame-no-ukihashi (天浮橋; "floating bridge of heaven"), they churned the chaotic mass with the spear. When drops of salty water fell from the tip, they formed into the first island, Onogoroshima. In forming this island, both gods came down from heaven, and spontaneously built a central support column called the Ame-no-mihashira (天御柱; "heavenly pillar") which upheld the "hall measuring eight fathoms" that the gods caused to appear afterwards.

Then they initiated conversation inquiring of each other's anatomy, leading to a mutual decision to mate and reproduce:

IZANAGI:

How has your body been made? (Note: 「汝身者如何成也」 (in Old Japanese); 「あなたの体はどのようにできていますか」 (transcription in modern Japanese). Kojiki.)

IZANAMI:

My body is fully formed, except for a part which has not quite grown. (Note: 「妾身層層鑄成 然未成處有一處在」 (in Old Japanese); 「私の体には、成長して、成長していないところが1ヶ所あります」 (transcription in modern Japanese). Kojiki.)

IZANAGI:

My body is fully formed, except I have a part that has grown too much. If I place the part of my body that has grown too much, and plug the part of your body not yet grown, we will produce lands and dominions. What say you to this? (Note: 「吾身亦層層鑄也 尚有凸餘處一 故以此吾身之餘處 刺塞汝身之未成處 為完美態而生國土 奈何」 (in Old Japanese); 「私の体には、成長して、成長し過ぎたところが1ヶ所あります。そこで、この私の成長し過ぎたところで、あなたの成長していないところを刺して塞いで、国土を生みたいと思います。生むのはどうですか。」 (transcription in modern Japanese). Kojiki.)

Izanami accepted the offer and Izanagi proposed that both should circle around the column Ame-no-mihashira in opposite directions, Izanami going right and Izanagi left and on meeting each other would perform sexual intercourse (maguwai (麻具波比)). However, when they met on the other side of the pillar, Izanami was the first to speak, saying: "Oh, indeed you are a beautiful and kind youth!", to which Izanagi replied: "Oh, what a most beautiful and kind youth!". Izanagi then rebukes Izanami saying: "It is wrong for the wife to speak first."

However, they mated anyway and later fathered a child Hiruko (lit. "leech child), who was placed in a reed boat dragged by the current. (Note: Later popular legends say he became the god Ebisu. It does not say so in the Kojiki) Afterwards they gave birth to Awashima (淡島; lit. "island of foam"). Neither Hiruko nor Awashima were considered legitimate children of Izanagi and Izanami.

Izanagi and Izanami decided to ascend to heaven and consult the primordial gods at Takamagahara about the ill-formed children that resulted from their union. The gods determined through divination that the female speaking first during the ceremony was the cause. So the couple returned to Onogoroshima island and repeated the rite encircling the column, only making sure Izanagi was the first to speak out in greeting. When finished, they performed the union successfully and lands began to be born.

==== Birth of the islands ====
According to the legend, the formation of Japan began with the creation of eight large islands by Izanagi and Izanami. In order of birth these islands are the following:

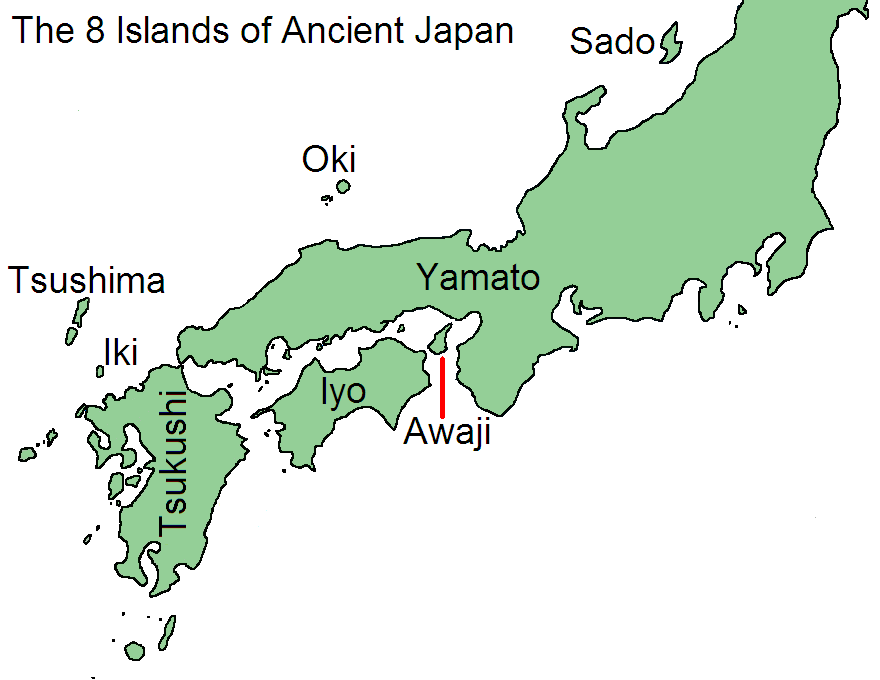

1. Awaji-no-ho-no-sawake-no-shima (淡道之穂之狭別島): currently, Awaji Island;
2. Iyo-no-futana-no-shima (伊予之二名島): currently, Shikoku. This island had a body and four faces. The names of the faces are as follows:
  - Ehime (愛比売): Iyo Province;
  - Ihiyorihiko (飯依比古): Sanuki Province;
  - Ohogetsuhime (大宣都比売): Awa Province;
  - Takeyoriwake (建依別): Tosa Province.
3. Oki-no-mitsugo-no-shima (隠伎之三子島): today, Oki Islands. Dubbed Ame-no-oshikorowake (天之忍許呂別);
4. Tsukushi-no-shima (筑紫島): today, Kyūshū. This island had a body and four faces. The names of the faces are as follows:
  - Shirahiwake (白日別): Tsukushi Province;
  - Toyohiwake (豊日別): Toyo Province;
  - Takehimukahitoyokujihinewake (建日向日豊久士比泥別): Hi Province;
  - Takehiwake (建日別): Kumaso.
5. Iki-no-shima (伊伎島): today, Iki Island. Dubbed Amehitotsubashira (天比登都柱);
6. Tsu-shima (津島): today, Tsushima Island. Dubbed Ame-no-sadeyorihime (天之狭手依比売);
7. Sado-no-shima (佐度島): today, Sado Island;
8. Ohoyamatotoyoakitsu-shima (大倭豊秋津島): today, Honshu. Dubbed Amatsumisoratoyoakitsunewake (天御虚空豊秋津根別).

Traditionally these islands are known as Ōyashima (lit. eight large islands) and as a whole are what is currently known as Japan. In the myth neither Hokkaidō nor the Ryukyu Islands are mentioned as these were not known to the Japanese at the time of compiling the Kojiki.

Additionally, Izanagi and Izanami then gave birth to six islands:

1. Kibi-no-kojima (吉備児島): Kojima Peninsula of Kibi (now in Okayama). Dubbed Takehikatawake (建日方別);
2. Azuki-jima (小豆島): Shōdoshima. Dubbed Ohonodehime (大野手比売);
3. Oho-shima (大島): Suō-Ōshima. Dubbed Ohotamaruwake (大多麻流別);
4. Hime-jima (女島): Himeshima. Dubbed Amehitotsune (天一根);
5. Chika-no-shima (知訶島): Gotō Islands. Dubbed Ame-no-oshio (天之忍男);
6. Futago-no-shima (両児島): Danjo Islands. Dubbed Amefutaya (天両屋).

=== According to the Nihon Shoki ===
The story of this book only differs in that Izanagi and Izanami volunteered to consolidate the earth. In addition, the two deities are described as "god of yang" (陽神 youshin, male deity) and "goddess of yin" (陰神 inshin, female deity) influenced by the ideas of Yin and yang. The rest of the story is identical, except that the other celestial gods (Kotoamatsukami) do not appear, nor are the last six smaller islands mentioned that were born through Izanagi and Izanami.
