= Kumano region =

The Kumano Region (熊野地方, Kumano chihō) is a region situated on the southern part of the Kii Peninsula in Japan, former Muro District. It includes parts of Mie Prefecture, Wakayama Prefecture, and Nara Prefecture. It is home to three major shrines, Kumano Hongū Taisha, Kumano Nachi Taisha, and Kumano Hayatama Taisha. The Kumano region was first mentioned in the Kojiki as the burial site for the goddess Izanami, said to be at Hananoiwaya Shrine.

In 2004 it became a UNESCO-designated World Heritage Site.

== See also ==
- Kumano shrine
- Sacred Sites and Pilgrimage Routes in the Kii Mountain Range
