= Izanagi Shrine =

Shinto shrine in Japan

Izanagi Jingū 伊弉諾神宮
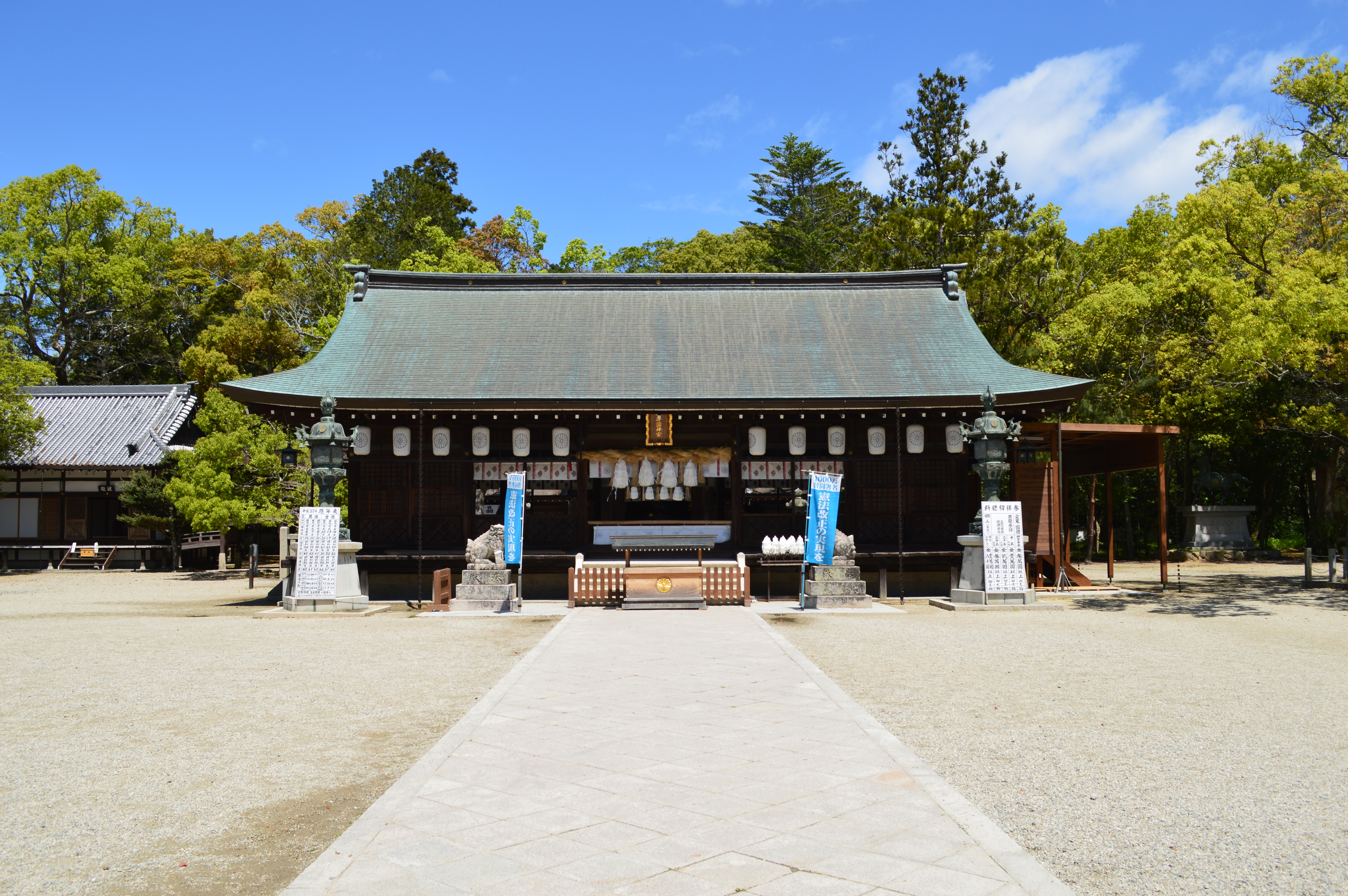
- Izanagi Jingū Haiden

- Location within Hyōgo Prefecture Location within Japan

Religion
- Affiliation: Shinto
- Deity: Izanagi, Izanami
- Festival: April 22

Location
- Location: 740 Taga, Awaji-shi, Hyogo-ken 656-1521
- Interactive map of Izanagi Jingū 伊弉諾神宮
- Coordinates: 34°27′36″N 134°51′08″E

Architecture
- Style: Nagare-zukuri

Website
- Official website

Izanagi Jingū (伊弉諾神宮) is a Shinto shrine in the Taga neighborhood of the city of Awaji in Hyōgo Prefecture, Japan. It is the ichinomiya of former Awaji Province. The main festival of the shrine is held annually on April 22.

== Enshrined kami ==
The kami enshrined at Izanagi Jingū are:

- Izanagi-no-mikoto (伊弉諾尊)
- Izanami-no-mikoto (伊弉冉尊)

== History ==
Per Japanese mythology as outlined in the Kojiki and Nihon Shoki, the Japanese archipelago (starting with Awaji Island), the kami, and all living things were created by the progenitor gods Izanagi and Izanami. After this work was completed, Izanagi retired into seclusion on Awaji Island where his tomb was located on the site of his palace. The documentary history, mention of a shrine to Izanagi in Awaji is made in an entry in the Nihon Shoki under the reigns of Emperor Richu and Emperor Ingyō and the shrine appears in the Nihon Sandai Jitsuroku in an entry dated 859. In the 927 Engishiki, it is listed a Myōjin Taisha, and as the ichinomiya of the province. According to the records of nearby Myokyo-ji, Tamura Nakazane, a descendant of Sakanoue no Tamuramaro, rebuilt the shrine in 1280. The Tamura clan served as hereditary kannushi and as local feudal lords into the Sengoku period. In 1581, Oda Nobunaga ordered Tamura Tsuneharu to take the lead in a battle against Takeda Katsuyori, but he was defeated and the Tamura clan were destroyed. During the Edo period, the shrine was supported by the Hachitsuka clan, daimyō of Tokushima Domain. During the Meiji period era of State Shinto, the shrine was designated as a National shrine, 2nd rank (国幣中社, Kokuhei Chūsha) in 1871 under the Modern system of ranked Shinto Shrines. It was promoted to an Imperial shrine, 1st rank (官幣大社, Kanpei Taisha) in 1885.

In 1932, Izanami was added to the roster of the shrine, which in 1954 was renamed from Izanagi Jinja to Izanagi Jingū.

The Honden is a three-bay Nagare-zukuri-style building connected to the Heiden by a roof. It was built on the site of the alleged tomb of Izanagi in 1882. The site had previously been a "forbidden land" upon which trespass was strictly forbidden for centuries. The Zuishin-mon on the approach to the shrine was completed in 1883. The Kamiike pond in the precincts is said to be the remains of a moat which once surrounded the ruins of Izanagi's palace and tomb.

== Gallery ==
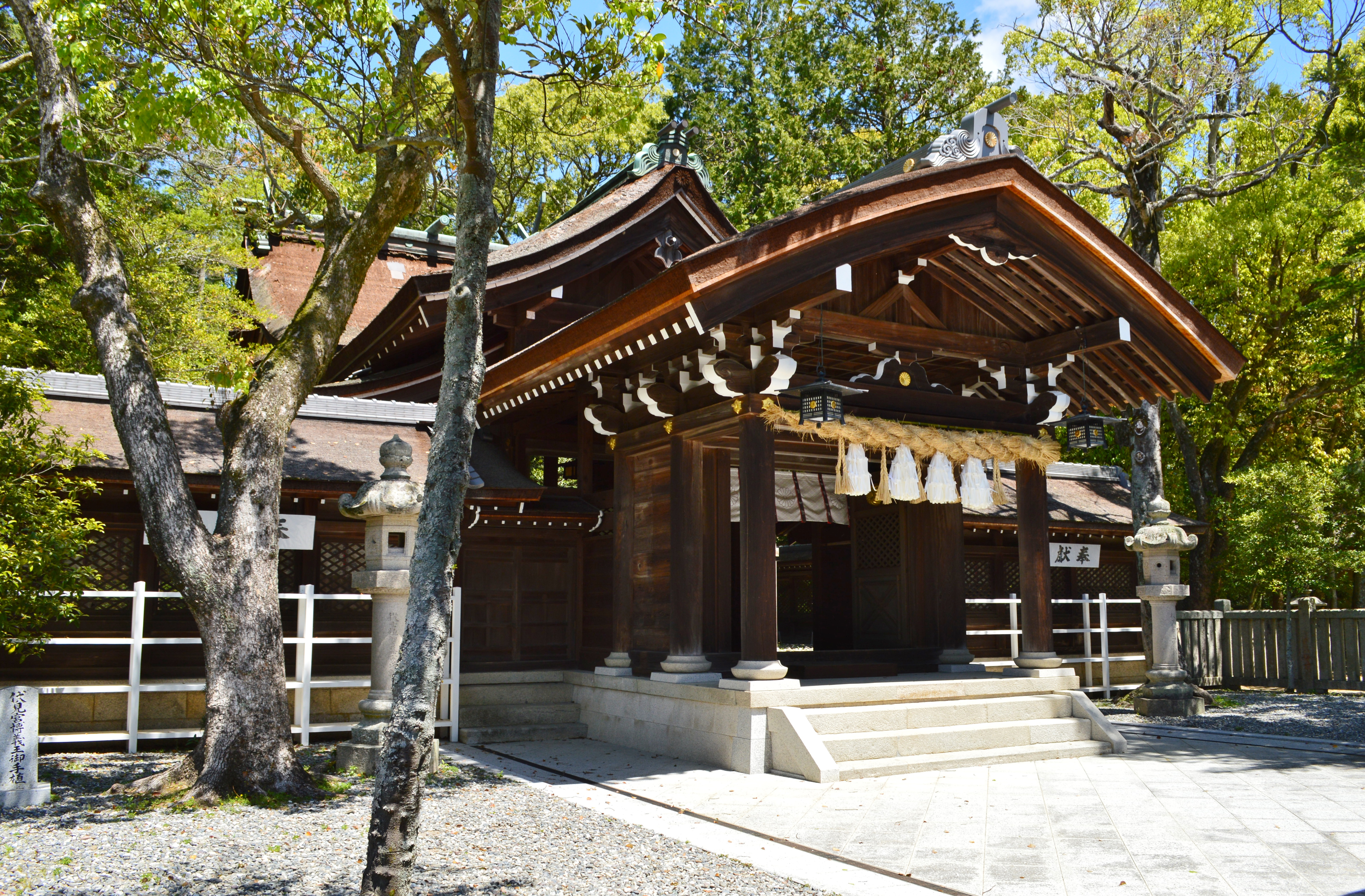
Honden

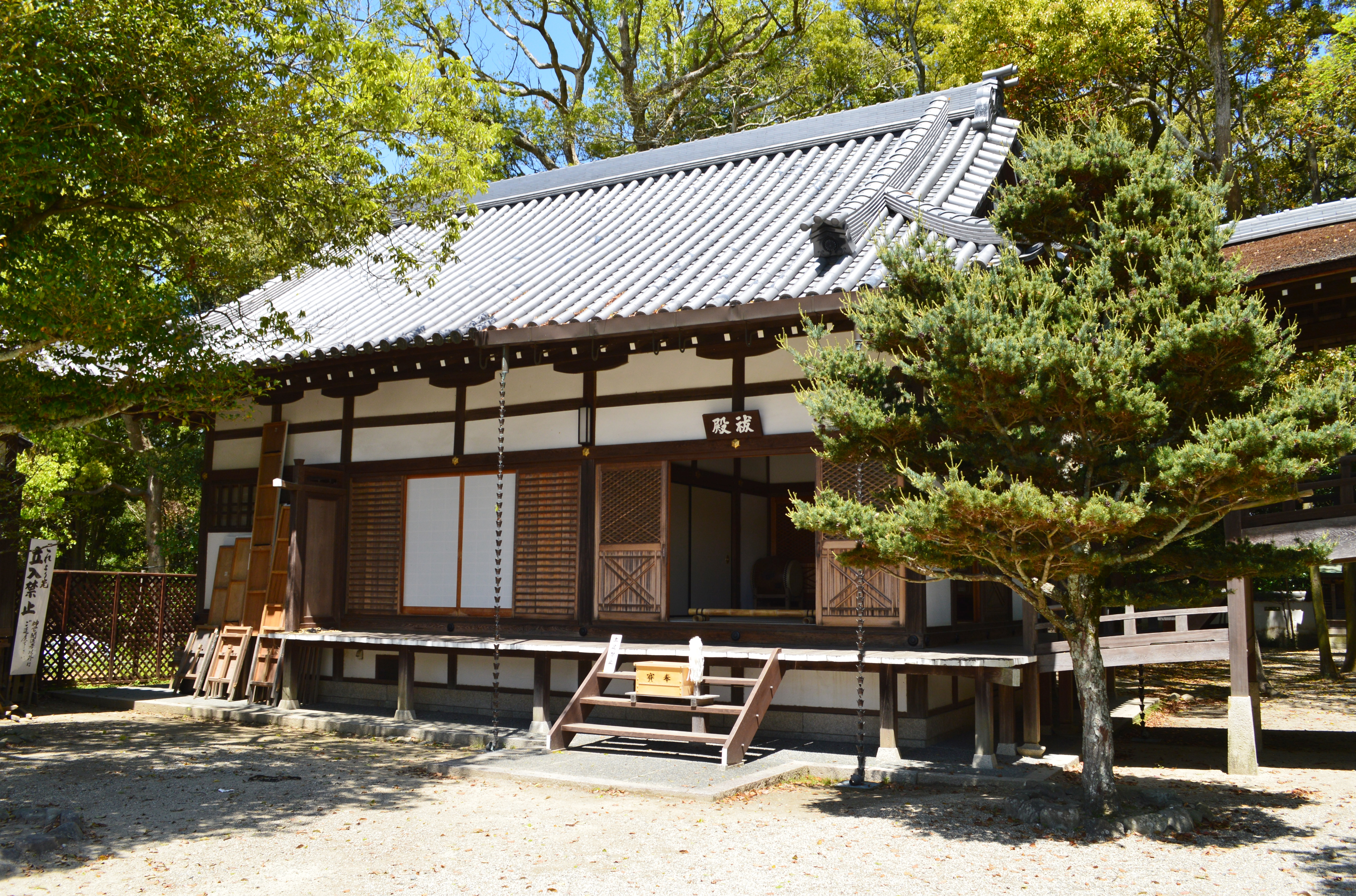
Haraeden

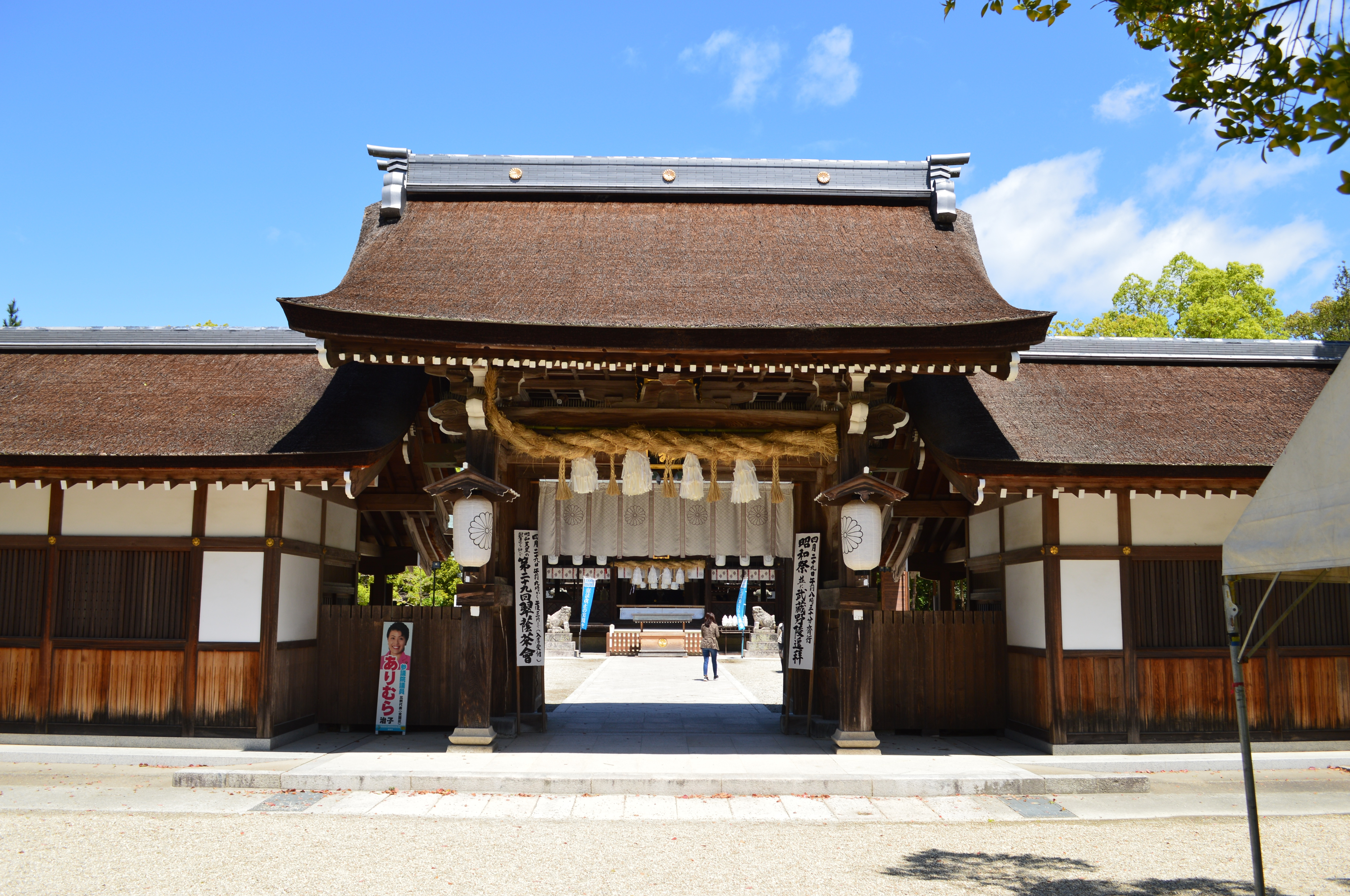
Zuishin-mon

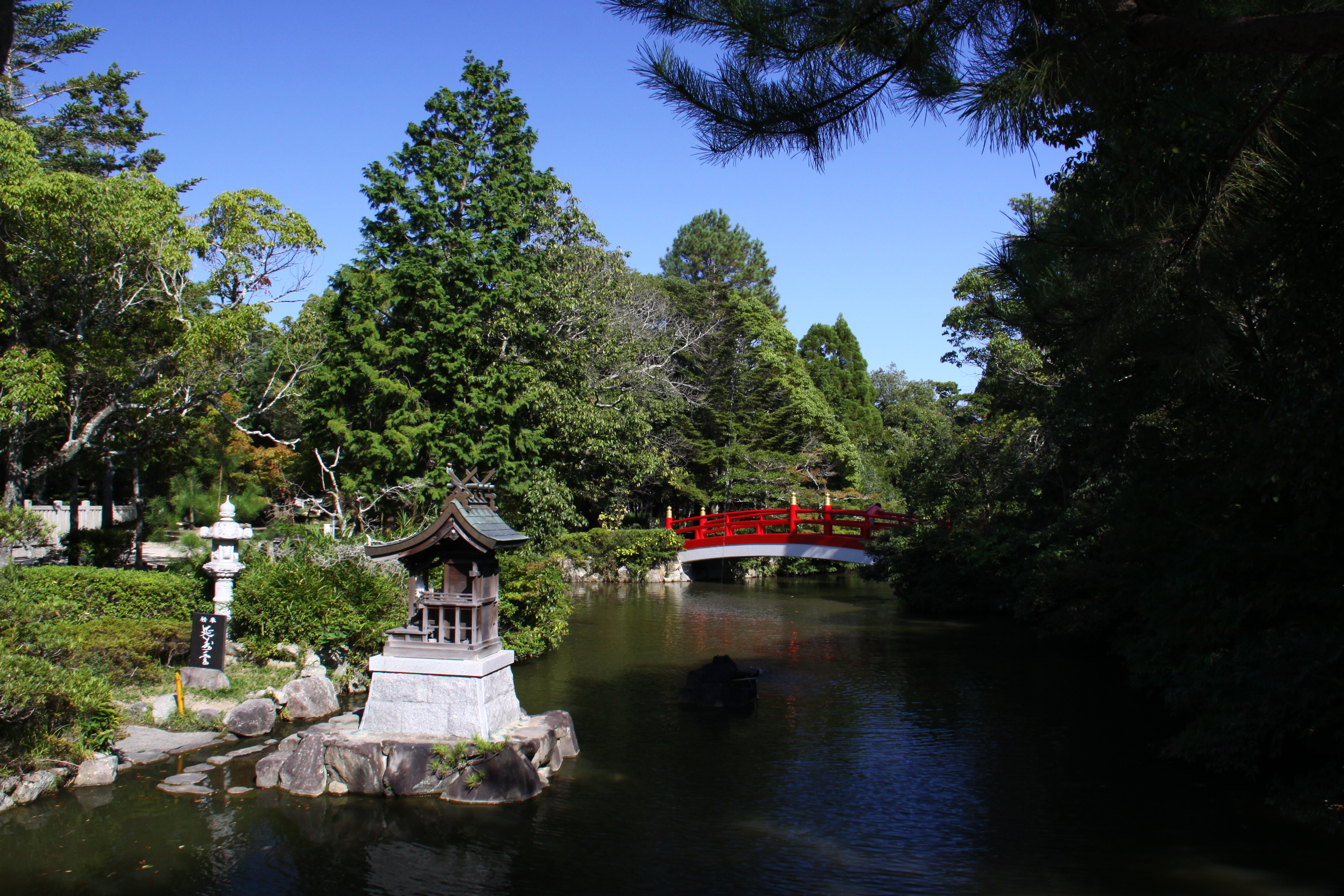
Kamiike

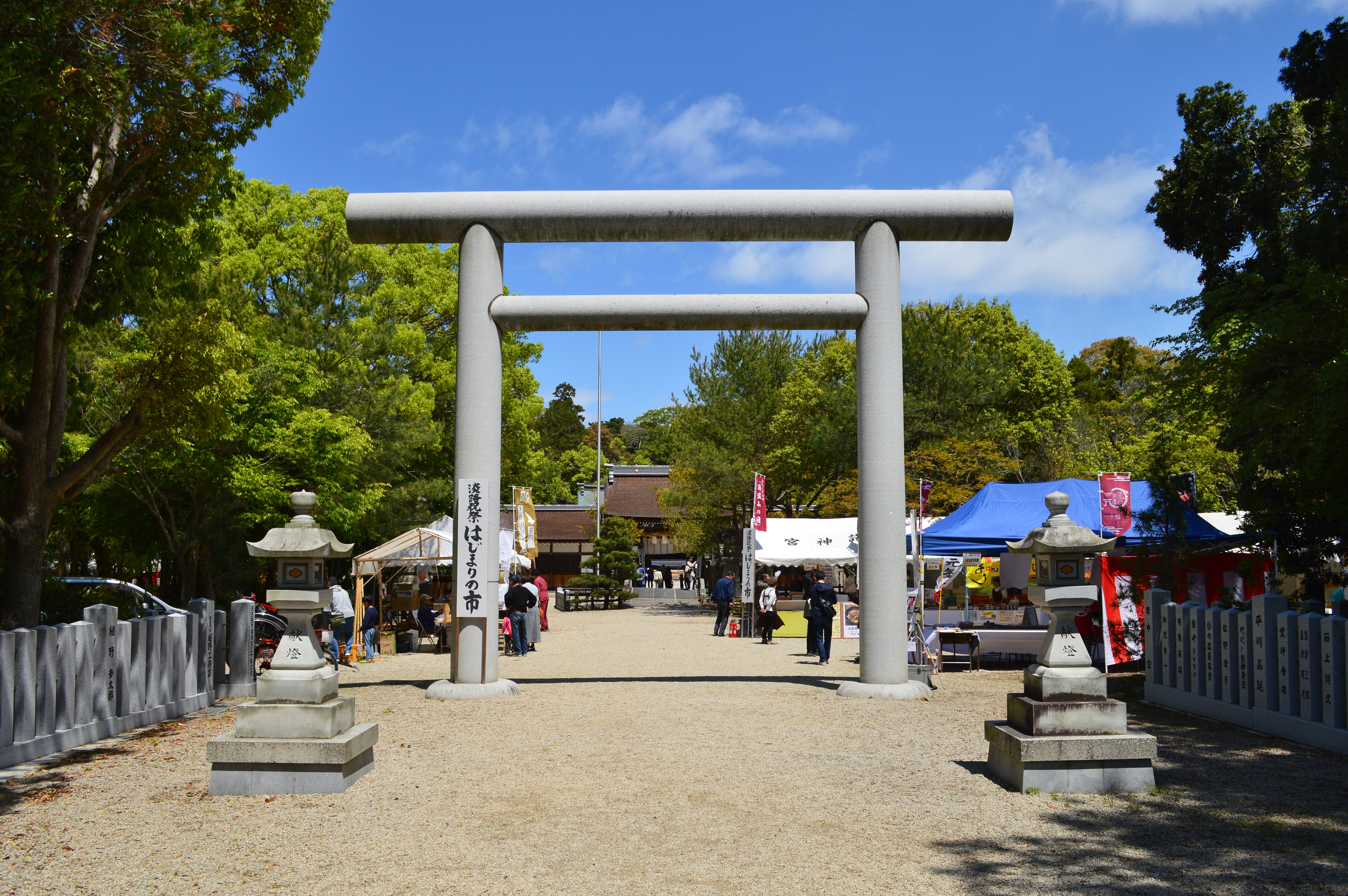
Torii

== See also ==
- List of Jingū
- List of Shinto shrines
- Ichinomiya
