= Hananoiwaya Shrine =

Shinto shrine in Mie Prefecture, Japan

Coordinates: 33.880°N 136.0936°E

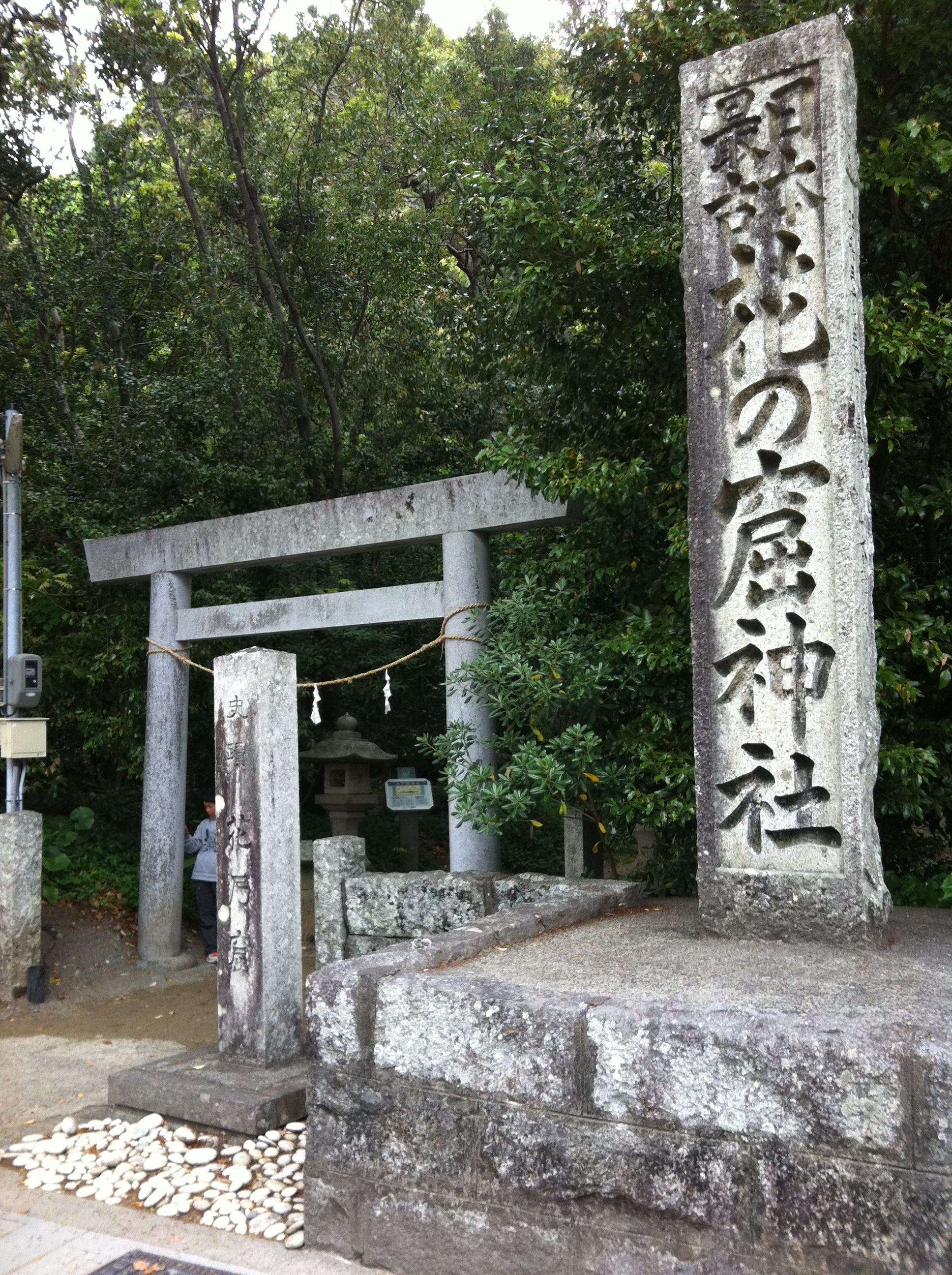

Religion
- Affiliation: Shinto
- Interactive map of Hananoiwaya Shrine

Website
- https://hananoiwaya.com/index.html

Hananoiwaya Shrine (Japanese: 花窟神社) is a Shinto shrine in the Arima neighborhood of the city of Kumano, Mie, Japan. It is a site of worship for the kami Izanami and Kagu-tsuchi. The shrine is the site of a cave, the Flower Cavern (花の窟), that is said to be the grave of Izanami. The cave is believed to mark the entrance to the underworld where Izanagi attempted to find Izanami after she died giving birth to Kagu-tsuchi. According to the Nihon Shoki, after Izanagi saw Izanami's rotting corpse, he sealed the entrance from the world of the living with a large boulder. In 2004, the shrine was registered as part of the Sacred Sites and Pilgrimage Routes in the Kii Mountain Range by UNESCO.

== History ==
The shrine complex at Hananoiwaya Shrine dates back to the Paleolithic era and is described in the Nihon Shoki. The shrine is one of the oldest in Japan, although the exact date of its construction is unknown; the first written record of it dates back to 720 AD in the Nara period. The shrine area has no actual buildings that house the kami, but rather the object of veneration is the massive rock itself.

Hananoiwaya is not mentioned as a shrine in either the Kojiki or the Engishiki, but rather as the name of a cemetery. Hananoiwaya was given the status of a shrine during the Meiji period.

Hananoiwaya Shrine figures in both Shinto and Buddhist histories. The 10th century priest and poet Zōki, in his pilgrimage account Ionushi (庵主, The Master of the Hut), describes how the area around the cavern that was identified as the tomb of Izanami, as well as the cave itself, was full of buried sutras, in the belief that the texts will later rise up from the earth when Maitreya, the future Buddha, arrives. D. Max Moerman describes the sutra burials as a way of making the area sacred to both a Buddhist future and the Imperial House of Japan as the descendants of Izanami.

== Festivals ==
A 170-meter shimenawa (標縄), made by local citizens from seven intertwined ropes, is extended from a concrete pole (previously a sacred pine tree) and the 45-meter high rock face that blocks the entrance to the underworld. A rope-changing festival called otsunakake shinji (御綱掛け神事) is held semiannually, on February and October 2, following a sacred dance to the gods. If the rope does not give way during the pulling, it remains until it breaks - a rope that withstands is considered a sign of good luck and a new rope is placed alongside it. This festival has been designated as an Intangible Cultural Property of Mie Prefecture.
