= Mount Hiba =

Mount Hiba (比婆山, Hiba-yama) may refer to:

- Mount Hiba (Hiroshima), Japan
- Mount Hiba (Shimane), Japan
