= Aoyama Kumano Shrine =

Kumano shrine in Shibuya, Tokyo, Japan

- 青山熊野神社
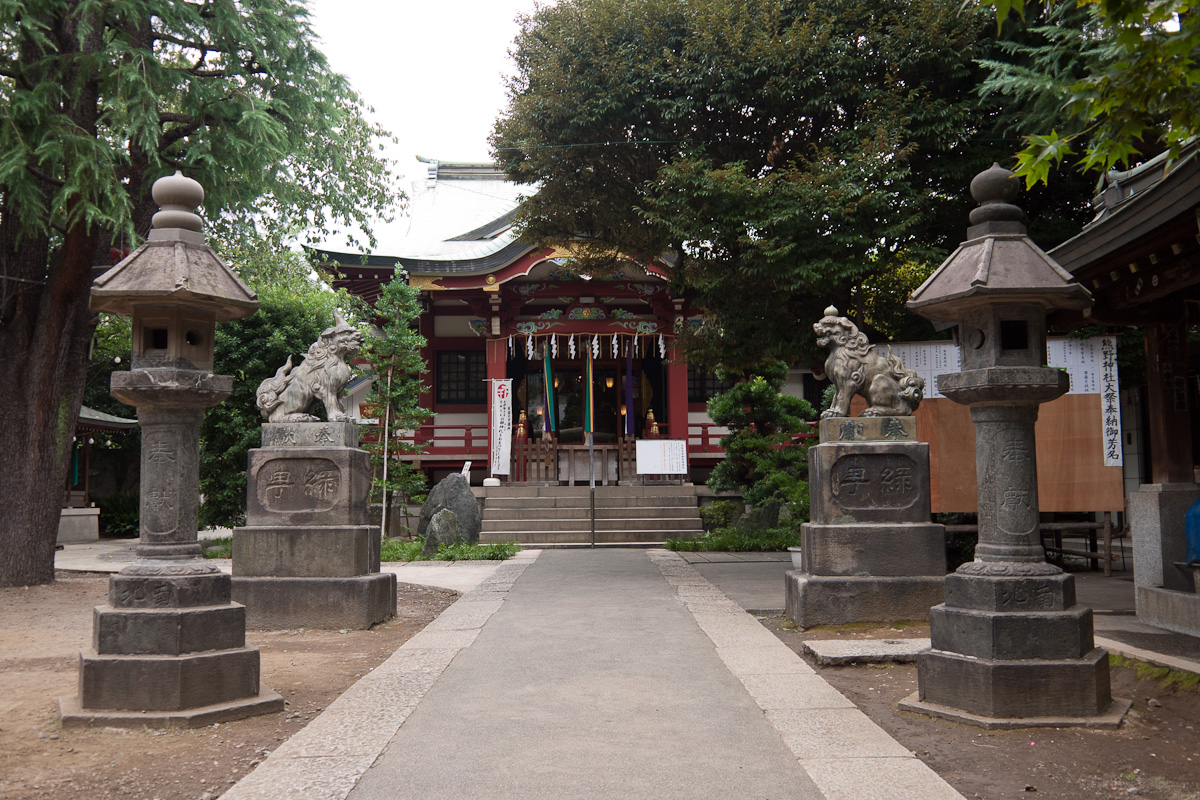
- The shrine in 2011

- Location within Japan

Religion
- Affiliation: Shinto
- Region: Tokyo
- Deity: Izanami, Tsumatsuhime, Ooyatsuhime, Itakeru

Location
- Location: Shibuya
- Country: Japan
- Interactive map of Aoyama Kumano Shrine
- Coordinates: 35.67245°N 139.71394°E

Architecture
- Founder: Tokugawa Yorinobu
- Completed: 1644 (current building)

Aoyama Kumano Shrine is a kumano shrine in Shibuya, Tokyo, Japan. It dates back to 1619 and was originally named Kumano Daigongen but was changed in 1869, Meiji era due to a law separating Buddhism and Shintoism, the shrine primarily practices Shinto principles.

== Deities associated with the shrine ==
- Izanami-no-Mikoto
- Itakeru-no-Mikoto
- Ooyatsuhime-no-Mikoto
- Tsumaatsuhime-no-Mikoto
