= Kuraokami =

Legendary Japanese dragon

Okami (淤加美神, Okami-no-kami) in the Kojiki, or in the Nihon Shoki: Kuraokami (闇龗) or Okami (龗), is a legendary Japanese dragon and Shinto deity of rain and snow. In Japanese mythology, the sibling progenitors Izanagi and Izanami gave birth to the islands and gods of Japan. After Izanami died from burns during the childbirth of the fire deity Kagu-tsuchi, Izanagi was enraged and killed his son. Kagutsuchi's blood or body, according to differing versions of the legend, created several other deities, including Kuraokami.

== Name ==
The name Kuraokami combines kura 闇 "dark; darkness; closed" and okami 龗 "dragon tutelary of water". This uncommon kanji (o)kami or rei 龗, borrowed from the Chinese character ling 龗 "rain-dragon; mysterious" (written with the "rain" radical 雨, 3 口 "mouths", and a phonetic of long 龍 "dragon") is a variant Chinese character for Japanese rei < Chinese ling 靈 "rain-prayer; supernatural; spiritual" (with 2 巫 "shamans" instead of a "dragon"). Compare this 33-stroke 龗 logograph with the simpler 24-stroke variant 靇 ("rain" and "dragon" without the "mouths"), read either rei < ling 靇 "rain prayer; supernatural" or ryō < long 靇 "sound of thunder", when used for ryo < long 隆 reduplicated in ryōryō < longlong 隆隆 "rumble; boom".

Marinus Willem de Visser (1913:136) cites the 713 CE Bungo Fudoki 豊後風土記 that okami is written 蛇龍 "snake dragon" in a context about legendary Emperor Keikō seeing an okami dragon in a well, and concludes, "This and later ideas about Kura-okami show that this divinity is a dragon or snake." Grafton Elliot Smith provides a Trans-cultural diffusionist perspective.

The snake takes a more obtrusive part in the Japanese than in the Chinese dragon and it frequently manifests itself as a god of the sea. The old Japanese sea-gods were often female water-snakes. The cultural influences which reached Japan from the south by way of Indonesia — many centuries before the coming of Buddhism — naturally emphasized the serpent form of the dragon and its connection with the ocean. (1919:101)

== Lineage ==
In the Kojiki, he is the father of female deity Hikawa-hime (日河比売, or Hikaha-hime) married Susanoo's grandson, the male deity Fuwanomojikunusunu (布波能母遅久奴須奴神, or Fuhanomojikunusunu) and from their union gave birth to the male deity Fukafuchi-no-Mizuyarehana (深淵之水夜礼花神). Fukafuchi-no-Mizuyarehana is the great-grandfather of the male deity Ōkuninushi (大国主神).

Then, the great-grandson of Ōkuninushi, Mikanushi-hiko (甕主日子神) married Hinarashi-hime (比那良志毘売), who is the daughter of Okami, sister of Hikawa-hime. From the union of Mikanushi-hiko and Hinarashi-hime gave birth to the male deity Tahirikishimarumi (多比理岐志麻流美神).

== Kojiki ==
The c. 680 CE Kojiki transcribes Kuraokami Kami with man'yōgana as 闇淤加美 "dark o-ka-mi god". In the Kojiki version of this myth, Izanagi killed Kagutsuchi with his giant sword, and the blood subsequently created eight kami "gods; spirits". The final two generated from blood that dripped off the hilt onto Izanagi's fingers were Kuraokami and Kuramitsuha Kami 闇御津羽神 "dark mi-tsu-ha god".

Then His Augustness the Male-Who-invites, drawing the ten-grasp sabre that was augustly girded on him, cut off the head of his child the Deity Shining-Elder. Hereupon the names of the Deities that were born from the blood that stuck to the point of the august sword and bespattered the multitudinous rock-masses were: the Deity Rock-Splitter, next the Deity Root-Splitter, next the Rock-Possessing-Male-Deity. The names of the Deities that were next born from the blood that stuck to the upper part of the august sword and again bespattered the multitudinous rock-masses were: the Awfully-Swift-Deity, next the Fire-Swift-Deity, next the Brave-Awful-Possessing-Male-Deity, another name for whom is the Brave-Snapping-Deity, and another name is the Luxuriant-Snapping Deity. The names of the Deities that were next born from the blood that collected on the hilt of the august sword and leaked out between his fingers were: the Deity Kura-okami and next the Deity Kura-mitsuha. All the eight Deities in the above list, from the Deity Rock-Splitter to the Deity Kura-mitsuha, are Deities that were born from the august sword.

Basil Hall Chamberlain notes, "The etymology of both these name is obscure. Kura, the first element of each compound, signifies 'dark'."

Another Kojiki section listing ancestors of Ōkuninushi 大国主 "great country master" says Okami Kami's daughter Hikaha Hime 日河比売 "sun river princess" had a daughter Fukabuchi no mizu Yarehana 深淵之水夜礼花 "deep pool water lost flower".

The Deity Fuha-no-moji-Ku-nu-su-nu ... wedded Princess Hikaha, daughter of the Deity Okami, and begot a child: Water-Spoilt-Blossom-of-Fuka-buchi. This Deity wedded the Deity Ame-no-tsudohe-chi-ne, and begot a child: the Deity Great-Water-Master. This Deity wedded the Deity Grand-Ears daughter of the Deity Funu-dzu-nu, and begot a child: the Deity Heavenly-Brandishing-Prince-Lord. This Deity wedded the Young-Princess-of-the-Small-Country, daughter of the Great-Deity-of-the-Small-Country, and begot a child: the Deity Master-of-the-Great-Land.

== Nihongi ==
The c. 720 CE Nihon Shoki writes Kuraokami with kanji as 闇龗 "dark rain-dragon". In the Nihongi version, Izanagi killed Kagutsuchi by cutting him into three pieces, each of which became a god: Kuraokami, Kurayamatsumi (闇山祇) "dark mountain respect", and Kuramitsuha 闇罔象 "dark water-spirit". This mitsuha 罔象 is a variant of mōryō 魍魎 "demon; evil spirit" (written with the "ghost radical" 鬼). Kurayamatsumi is alternately written Takaokami 高靇 "high rain-dragon". De Visser says, "This name is explained by one of the commentators as "the dragon-god residing on the mountains", in distinction from Kura-okami, "the dragon-god of the valleys".

At length he drew the ten-span sword with which he was girt, and cut Kagu-tsuchi into three pieces, each of which became changed into a God. Moreover, the blood which dripped from the edge of the sword became the multitudinous rocks which are in the bed of the Easy-River of Heaven. This God was the father of Futsu-nushi no Kami. Moreover, the blood which dripped from the hilt-ring of the sword spurted out and became deities, whose names were Mika no Haya-hi no Kami and next Hi no Haya-hi no Kami. This Mika no Haya-hi no Kami was the parent of Take-mika-suchi no Kami.

Another version is: "Mika no haya-hi no Mikoto, next Hi no haya-hi no Mikoto, and next Take-mika-tsuchi no Kami. Moreover, the blood which dripped from the point of the sword spurted out and became deities, who were called Iha-saku no Kami, after him Ne-saku no Kami, and next Iha-tsutsu-wo no Mikoto. This Iha-saku no Kami was the father of Futsu-nushi no Kami."

One account says: "Iha-tsutsu-wo no Mikoto, and next Iha-tsutsu-me no Mikoto. Moreover, the blood which dripped from the head of the sword spurted out and became deities, who were called Kura o Kami no Kami, next Kura-yamatsumi no Kami, and next Kura-midzu-ha no Kami.

William George Aston footnotes translations for these kami names: Kuraokami "Dark-god", Kurayamatsumi "Dark-mountain-body-god", and Kuramitsuha "Dark-water-goddess". De Visser says Kuramitsuha could be translated "Dark-water-snake", "Valley-water-snake", or "Female-water-snake".

== Man'yōshū ==
The Man'yōshū poetry collection mentions an Okami 於可美 "rain dragon" living on an oka 岡 "ridge; knoll; hill". Lady Fujiwara, a daughter of Fujiwara no Kamatari, replies to a poem from her husband Emperor Tenmu (r. 672–686 CE– ) about an unseasonable snowstorm.

It was by speaking
To the dragon of my hill
I caused this snowfall;
A few flakes may have scattered.
No doubt, out there where you are.

— 2:104

Compare Edwin Cranston's translation with that of Burton Watson (1986:22), "I told the water god on my hill to let the snow fall. It scattered, and some must have fallen over your way!"

== Okami shrines ==
The diverse Japanese kami of water and rainfall, such as Suijin 水神 "water god" and Okami, are worshipped at Shinto shrines, especially during times of drought. For instance, Niukawakami Jinja 丹生川上神社 in Kawakami, Nara is a center of prayers for Kuraokami, Takaokami, and Mizuhanome 罔象女. Some other examples of shrines to Okami are:

- Okami Jinja (龗神社) in Daitō, Osaka
- Okami Jinja (於加美神社) in Minamiaizu, Fukushima
- Okami Jinja (意加美神社) in Hirakata and Izumisano, Osaka
- Kuraokami Jinja (闇龗神社) in Ichikai, Tochigi
- Takaokami Jinja (高龗神社) on Mount Miwa
- Takaokami Jinja (多加意加美神社) in Shōbara, Hiroshima
- Kunitsu Okami Jinja (國津意加美神社) on Iki Island

In addition, the water-god Takaokami is worshipped at various shrines named Kibune Jinja (貴船神社), found in places such as Sakyō-ku, Kyoto and Manazuru, Kanagawa.
