= Onogoro Island =

Island in Japanese mythology

Onogoroshima (Kojiki: 淤能碁呂島 Onogoro-shima; Nihon Shoki: 磤馭慮島 Onogoro-jima) is an important island in Shinto. The name derives from 自 (ono, "self") + 凝る (koru, "to coalesce, to aggregate together") + 島 (shima, "island").

== Shinto account ==
According to the Kojiki, Onogoroshima was created (kuniumi) when the divine couple Izanagi and Izanami churned the sea with the Amenonuhoko (heavenly spear) from their vantage point on the floating bridge of heaven. When they raised the spear from the ocean, drops fell from the spear, forming the island. They built a palace on top with a great column in the middle. The siblings walked around this pillar in opposite directions, and when they encountered each other, they were married. This island is where Hiruko (Ebisu) was born. The island is mentioned only three times in the Kojiki, at ch.3:3, ch:7:25, and ch.111:32.

== Real-world placement ==
In his Kojiki-den, a commentary on the Kojiki, the influential Kokugaku scholar Motoori Norinaga asserted that it referred to one of the small islands near Awajishima (e.g. Nushima or Tomogashima). On the island of Nu/ Nushima (Japanese: 沼島), there is a shrine commemorating both Izanagi and Izanami, Onogoro-jinja (Japanese: 自凝神社) on top of a sacred hill revered by all Japanese is where the first island of Japan is created – i.e. Nushima, then followed by other creation of islands.

== Folklore of the area surrounding of Onogoro Island ==
=== Nushima (沼島) ===
Nushima, located 4.6 km above the southern sea of Awaji Island, is an island whose shape has been compared with a magatama from the sky. In 1994, a very rare rock was discovered on this island, and it is called "Sayagata-shūkyoku (鞘型褶曲, i.e. "Sheath-shaped Fold)", which is regarded as the "Chikyū-no-Shiwa" (地球のしわ, i.e. "Wrinkle of the Earth"). It is around 100 million years old.

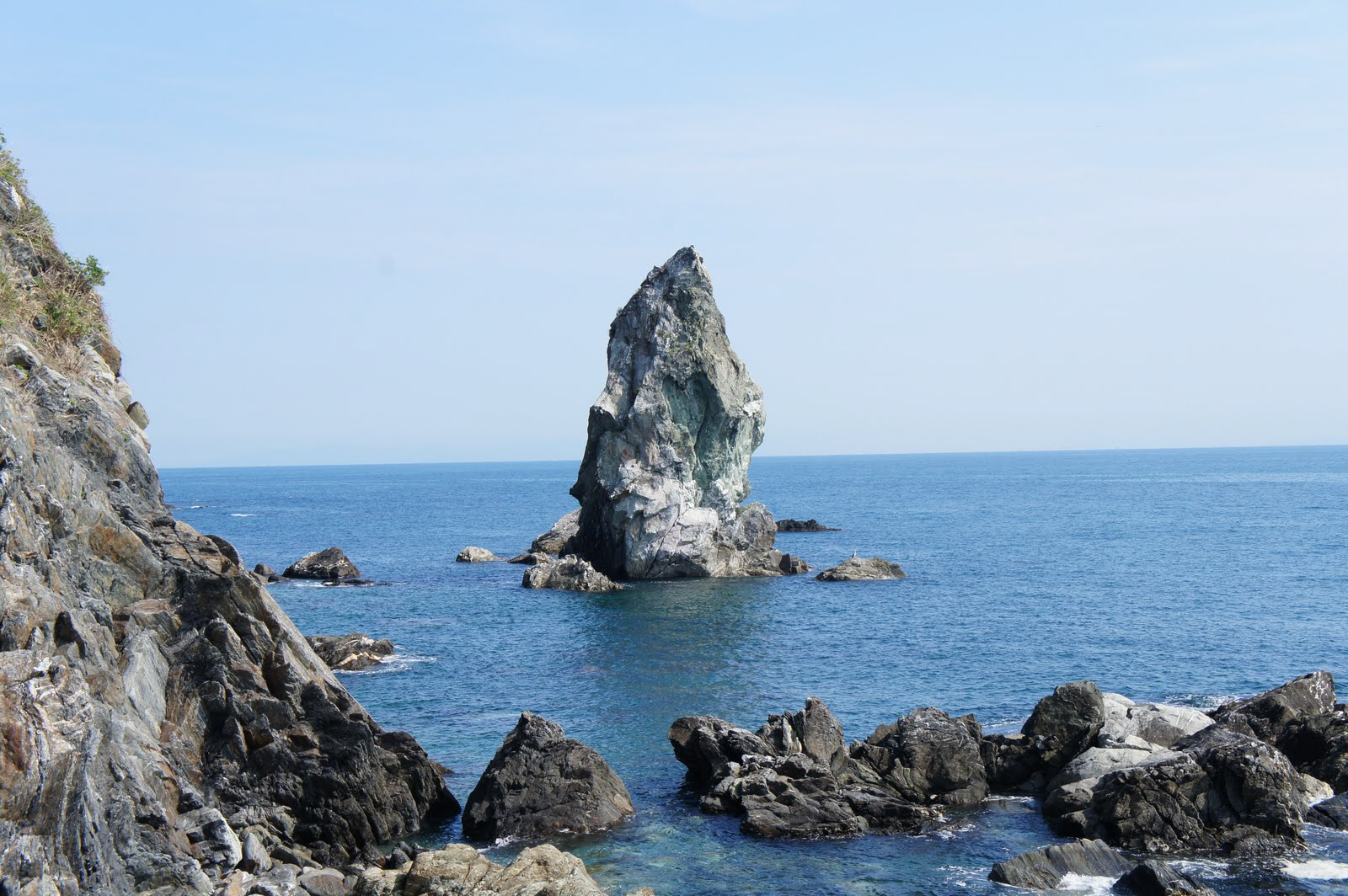
Kamitategami-Iwa, in the island of Nushima

There are many rocks and reefs on the shoreline of Numashima. On the southeast coast, there is a towering giant rock with a height of about 30 metres, which looks like a spear and has been called "Kamitategami-Iwa" (上立神岩) and "Ame-no-mihashira" (天の御柱, "the Pillar of Heaven"). It is said to be the one Izanagi and Izanami descended to according to Japanese mythology. It has become a reminiscent symbol and icon of the origin of the "Birth of the Japanese nation" (kamiumi).
