= Misogi =

Shinto practice

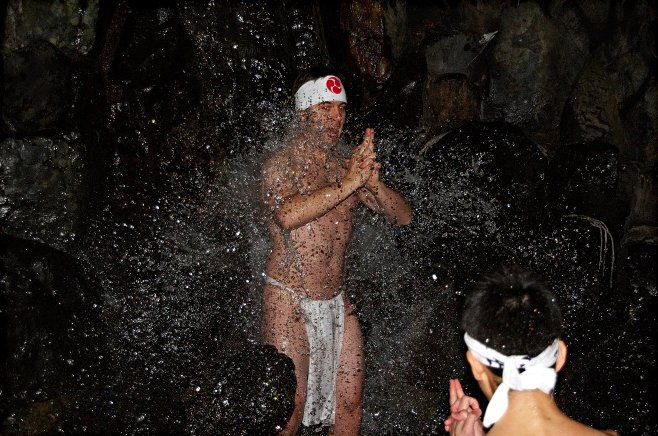
Night misogi under a waterfall at Tsubaki Grand Shrine

Misogi (禊) is a Japanese Shinto practice of ritual purification by washing the entire body. Misogi is related to another Shinto purification ritual, harae. Thus, both are collectively referred to as misogiharae (禊祓). The origin of misogi is traditionally traced to the myth of Izanagi's purification in the sea at Tachibana in Hyūga Province, undertaken after his return from the land of Yomi. According to the Kojiki, the deities Amaterasu, Tsukuyomi, and Susanoo were born respectively from Izanagi's washing of his left eye, right eye, and nose during this act of purification, establishing the mythological precedent for the practice.

== Background ==
Every year, many people take pilgrimages to sacred waterfalls, lakes and rivers, either alone or in small groups, to perform misogi. Mount Ontake, the Kii mountain range and Mount Yoshino are but a few examples of ancient and well known areas for misogi in Japan. In Kyoto, people douse themselves under Kiyomizu Temple's Otowa no taki (Sound-of-Wings) waterfall, although the majority of visitors drink from the waters rather than plunging into them. In the United States, misogi was performed at the Tsubaki Grand Shrine of America at the Konryu Myojin no Taki waterfall each morning in the years prior to its closure in 2023.

Before encountering misogi, members generally undergo some sort of preliminary purification. Such things as prayers, fasting, or some sort of physical activity is common. Generally, women put on a special white kimono and men put on a fundoshi loincloth, with both genders also wearing headbands. They then begin furitama (降り魂) or "spirit shaking" by clenching their hands in front of the stomach and shaking them up and down, vibrating the upper torso. The purpose of this is to become aware of/unified with the spirit's presence within. Following this is a "warm-up" or calisthenics (tori-fune (鳥船) or "bird-boat" rowing). These two aforementioned practices are sometimes accompanied by special prayers or incantations. After, the leader begins to speak out invocations/prayers that are said to activate the spirit. The followers generally speak along with them, thus affirming the potential for realizing one's own spirit, and thus unifying them with the kami around them.

The above exercises make participants raise their metabolism, and some groups accompany that with deep breathing. The exercises may be sprinkled with purifying salt and may be given sake to spit into the waterfall in three mouthfuls. Sometimes the participants are given salt to throw into the waterfall as they enter. In some groups, the leader counts to nine, cuts the air, and shouts the word "yei" to dispel this impurity. The participants then enter the waterfall while continuously chanting the phrase harai tamae kiyome tamae rokkon shōjō (祓い給え清め給え六根清浄). This phrase asks the kami to wash away the impurity from the six elements that make up the human being, the five senses and the mind. The practice of this varies from group to group, each having their own traditions or methods.

Misogi is also used in some forms of martial arts, especially aikido, to prepare the mind for training and to learn how to develop one's Tanden, or centre. The founder of aikido, Morihei Ueshiba, regularly used this form of meditation to complement his training and search for perfection. The Sen Shin tei Misogi Well at Ki Society Headquarters in Japan is a well-known place for people performing misogi with cold water before sunrise.

Shiogori is a related salt water puritication ritual. Historically, these rituals were performed in the sea heading into the mountains on the Nakahechi section of the Kumano-kodo pilgrim trail.

== See also ==
- Baptism
- Contrast bath therapy
  - Cryotherapy
- Ghusl
- Hydrotherapy
- Masbuta in Mandaeism
- Mikveh
- Purification of Izanagi
- Temizuya, a pavilion for ritual purification at the entrance to Shinto shrines
