= Akihasan Hongū Akiha Shrine =

Shinto shrine in Shizuoka Prefecture, Japan

Akihasan Hongū Akiha Jinja 秋葉山本宮秋葉神社
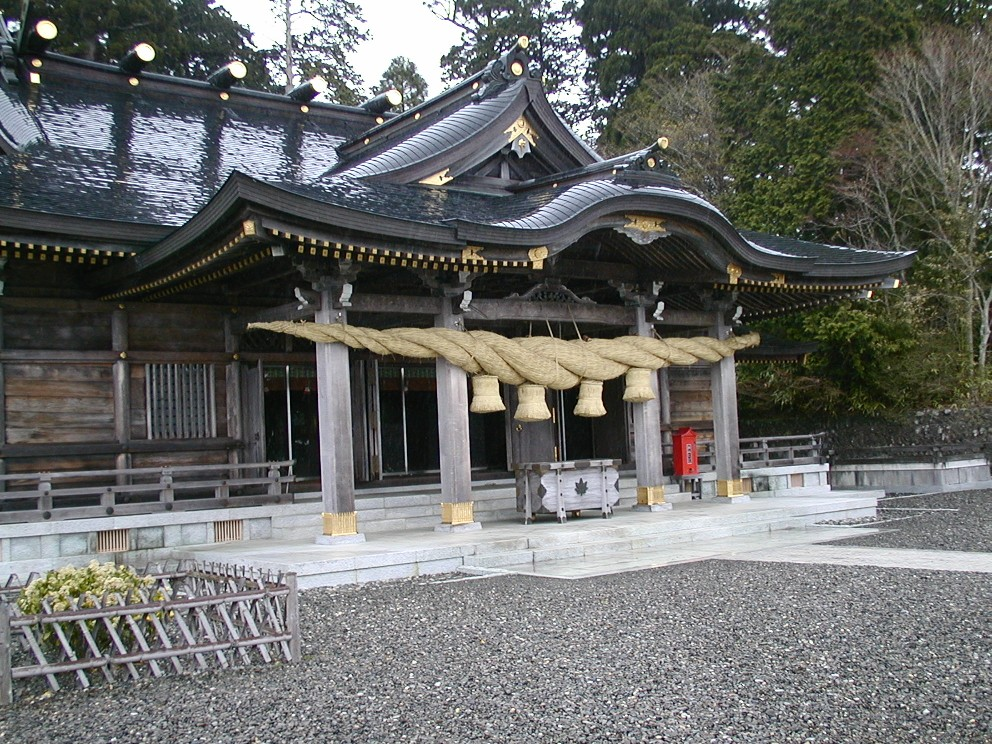
- Honden of Akihasan Hongū Akiha Jinja

- Location within Japan

Religion
- Affiliation: Shinto
- Deity: Hinokagutsuchi-no-Okami
- Type: Akiha shrine

Location
- Location: Haruno, Tenryū-ku, Hamamatsu, Shizuoka
- Interactive map of Akihasan Hongū Akiha Jinja 秋葉山本宮秋葉神社
- Coordinates: 34.981233°N 137.865781°E

Architecture
- Established: 701

Website
- www.akihasanhongu.jp

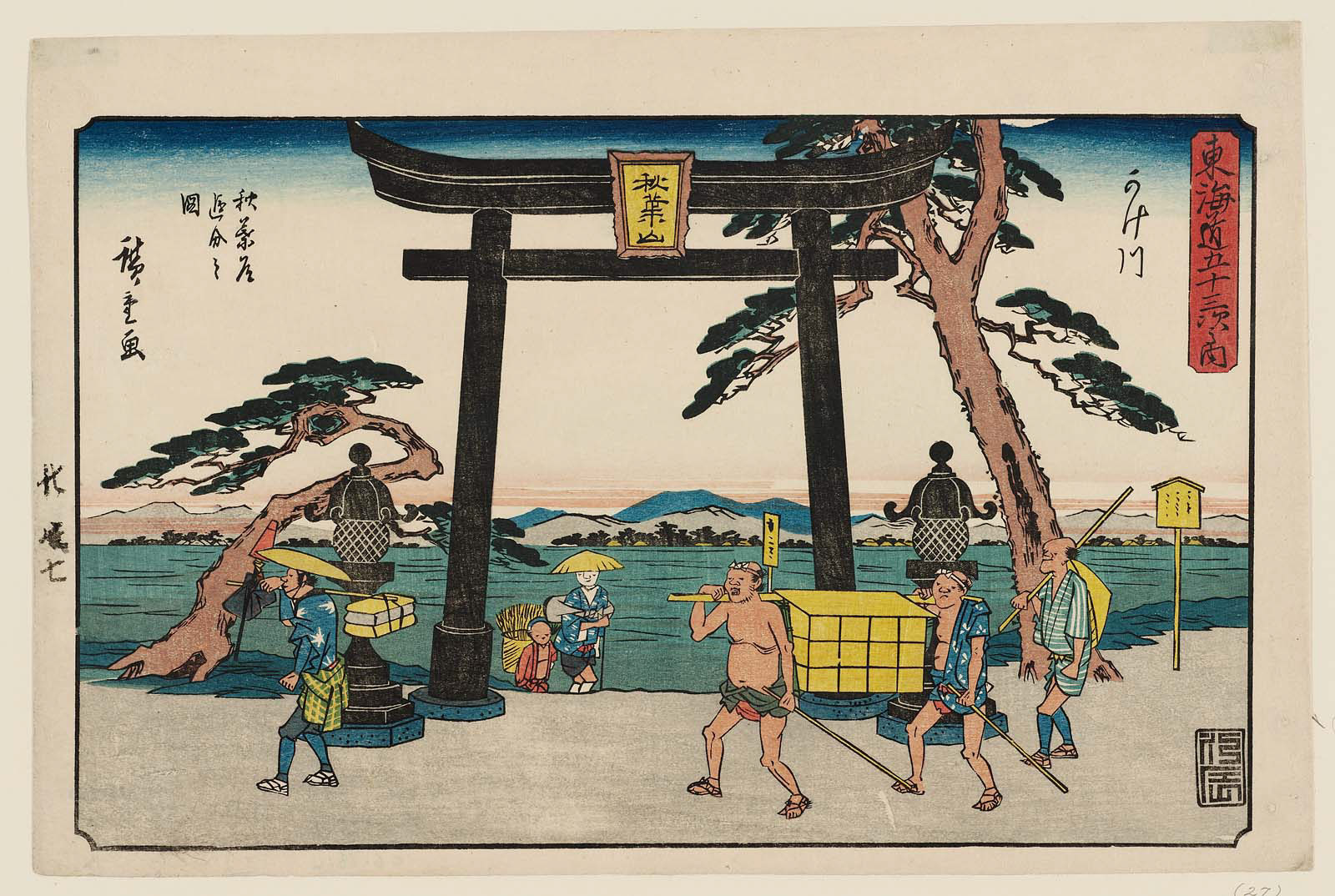
Hiroshige

The Akihasan Hongū Akiha Jinja (秋葉山本宮秋葉神社) is a Shinto shrine in Tenryū-ku, Hamamatsu (the former town of Haruno in Shizuoka Prefecture, Japan). The shrine is located near the summit of Mount Akiha, on the southern slopes of the Akaishi Mountains. It is the head shrine of the 800 Akiha shrines around the country.

The main festival of the shrine is held annually over three nights in December, and features ceremonies using huge flares and other fireworks.

== Enshrined kami ==
The primary kami of Akibasan Hongū Akiba Jinja is the Hinokagutsuchi-no-Okami (火之迦具土大神), the kami associated with protection against fires. During the Edo period, this kami was popularly called the Akiha Gongen (秋葉権現) and was identified with Kannon Bosatsu under the Shinbutsu shūgō system of combined Buddhism and Shinto.

== History ==
Per shrine tradition, the Akibasan Hongū Akiha Jinja was established in 701 as a Buddhist temple by the famed priest Gyōki. It was named Akiha-dera (秋葉寺) from a poem written by Emperor Saga in 709. During the Heian period it became a center for the Shugendō cult and was associated with the Shingon sect, although much of its subsequent history is uncertain.

After the start of the Tokugawa bakufu, retired shōgun Tokugawa Ieyasu ordered the temple to convert to the Sōtō Zen sect. Tokugawa Tsunayoshi in particular favored its blend of Shinto, Buddhism and Shugendō, and promoted the spread of the Akiha cult throughout the country to provide protection against fires. Despite its remote mountain location, the temple became a popular pilgrimage detour from the Tōkaidō for pilgrims on their way to Ise Shrine or Kompira Shrine, or on their way back to Edo.

However, in 1685, the government banned the traditional ceremony of carrying the shrine's mikoshi along the Tōkaidō Mount Akiha towards Edo and Kyoto, for fear that the riotous procession would disturb public order. The ban conversely helped spread the Akiha cult throughout the country through the establishment of numerous branch shrines, especially in the Chūbu region of Japan. Major Sōtō temples and monasteries often established a small Akiha shrine within their grounds.

After the Meiji Restoration, and the 1872 laws separating Buddhism and Shinto, the Shugendō cult was abolished, Buddhist images and implements were removed from the mountain to a new temple in Fukuroi and in 1873, the Akiha temple was proclaimed to be the “Akiha Shrine”. The shrine was regarded as a prefectural shrine under the State Shinto system. Most of the structures of the burned down in 1943, and were not restored until 1986.

The shrine has a small museum preserving remaining artifacts, including a number of swords presented as offerings by Imagawa Nakaaki, Takeda Shingen, Toyotomi Hideyoshi and Katō Kiyomasa.

== See also ==
- List of Shinto shrines
