= Iwasaku and Nesaku =

Two kami from Japanese mythology

Iwasaku (石折神 – Boulder Splitter) and Nesaku (根折神 – Root Splitter) are two kami in Shinto. They are a pair of minor star gods worshipped at shrines in the northern Kantō region.

== Mythology ==
The goddess Izanagi gave birth to the fire kami Kagutsuchi and suffered fatal burns in the process. Furious, her consort Izanagi beheaded Kagutsuchi as revenge. Some of Kagutsuchi's blood splashed onto an outcropping of rocks, and this blood became the kamis Iwasaku and Nesaku. The blood that stayed on Izanagi's sword turned into a third kami, known as Iwatsutsuo. In other versions of the story, Izanagi cut Kagutsuchi into three pieces and the blood became the kami Iwatsutsuo and Iwatsutsume.

The names of Iwasaku and Nesaku may have started as one name or word, Iwanesaku, meaning "the rugged outline of rocky craigs". The names also may be referencing the "splitting" power of swords or lightning. The exact meanings of the names Iwatsutsuo and Iwatsutsume are unknown, but it's believed that "Iwatsutsuo" refers to the hardness of a sword.
