= Eda Shrine =

Shinto shrine in Miyazaki Prefecture, Japan

Eda-jinja 江田神社
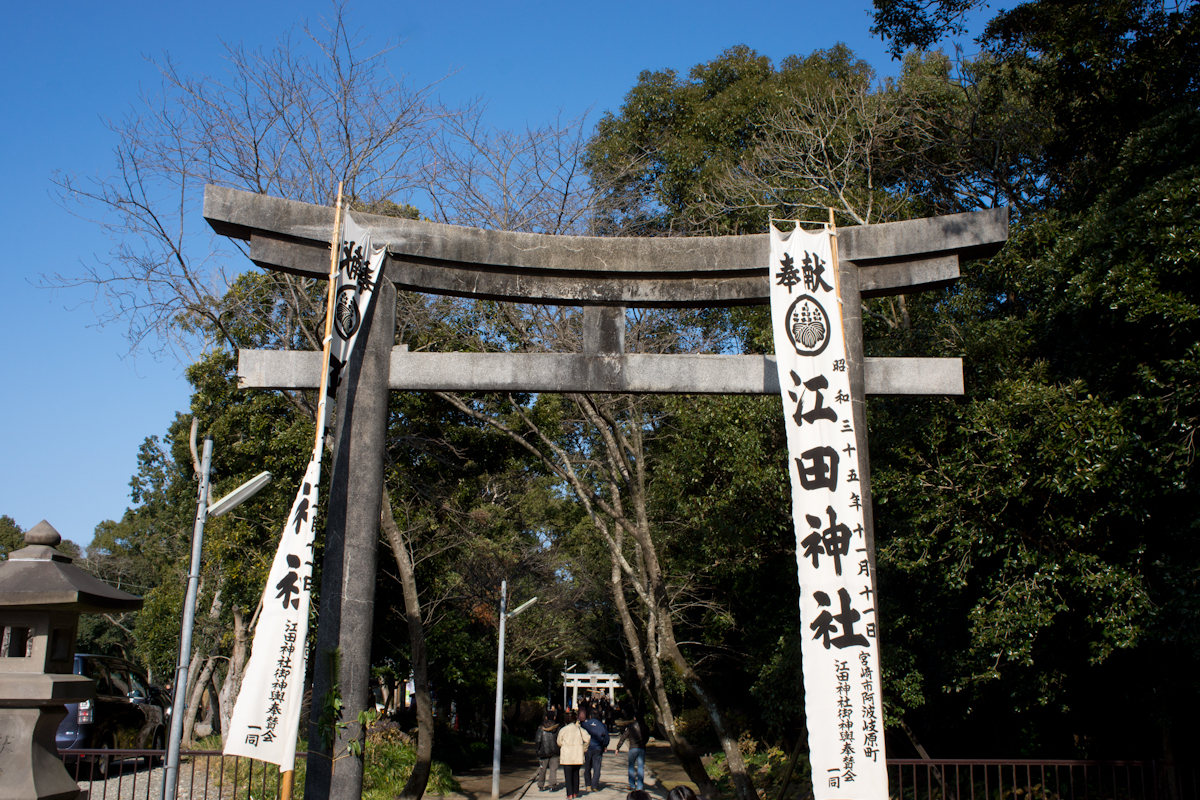
- Eda-Jinjya Shrine (Miyazaki)

- Location within Japan

Religion
- Affiliation: Shinto
- Deity: Izanagi

Location
- Location: 127, Awakigaharachō, Miyazaki; Miyazaki 880-0035
- Coordinates: 31°57′38″N 131°27′54″E

Website
- www.genbu.net/data/hyuga/eda_title.htm

Eda-jinja (江田神社) is a Shinto shrine located in Miyazaki, Miyazaki prefecture, Japan. It is dedicated to Izanagi.
