= Ame-no-Nuboko =

Japanese mythological weapon

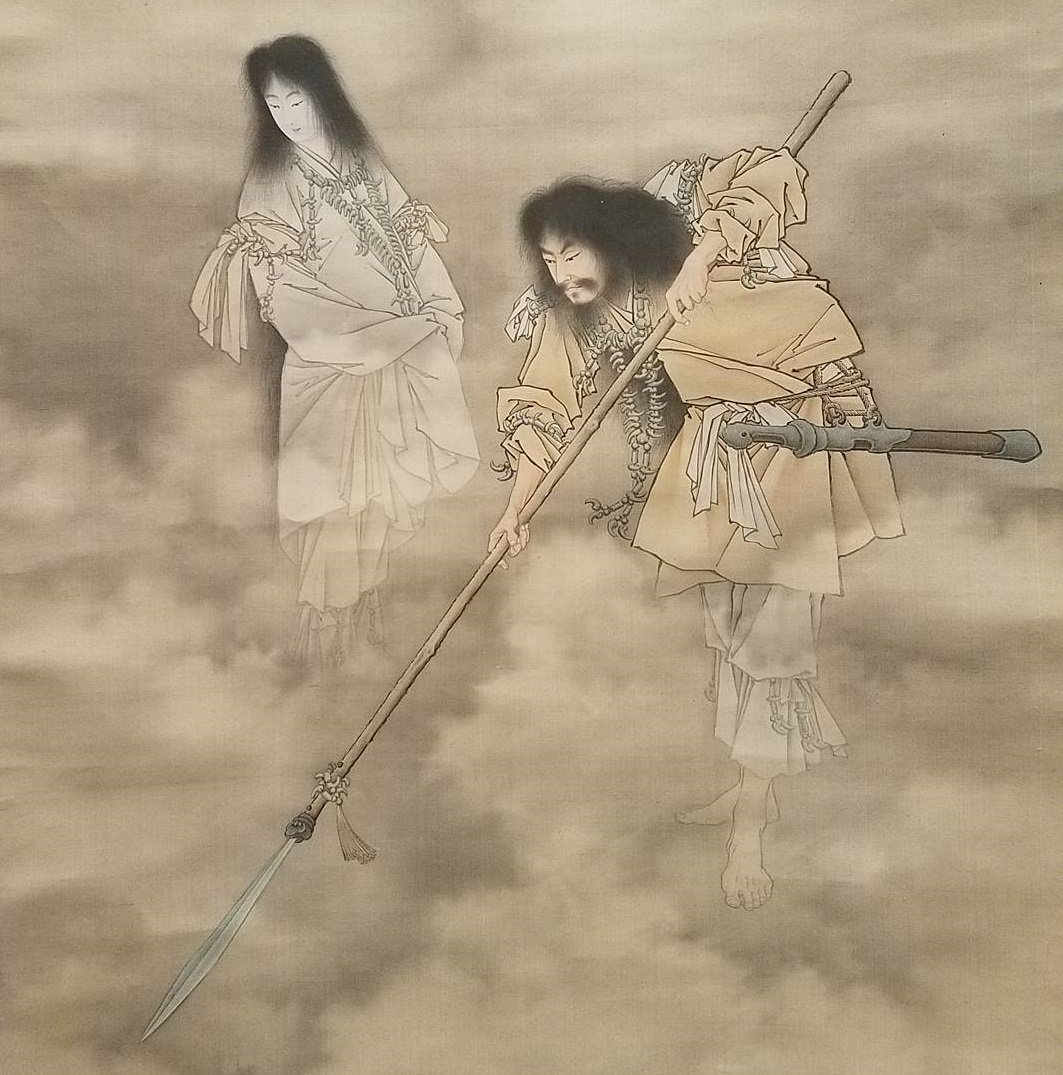
Searching the Seas with the Tenkei (天瓊を以て滄海を探るの図, Tenkei o motte sōkai o saguru no zu). Painting by Kobayashi Eitaku, 1880–90. Museum of Fine Arts, Boston. Izanagi to the right, Izanami to the left

Ame-no-Nuboko (天沼矛 or 天之瓊矛 or 天瓊戈; "heavenly jewel-spear"), also known simply by the Kan-on reading Tenkei (天瓊; "heavenly jewel"), is the name given to the hoko (lance) used to raise the primordial land-mass, Onogoro Island, from the sea in Japanese religion. It is often represented as a naginata.

According to the Kojiki, the gods of creation Izanagi and Izanami were responsible for the kuniumi (creation of land). To achieve this, they received a spear decorated with magatama (curved gems) from the older heavenly gods. The two deities then went to the bridge between heaven and earth, Ame-no-ukihashi, and churned the sea below with the spear. When drops of salty water fell from the tip, they formed into the first island, Onogoro. Izanagi and Izanami then descended from the bridge of heaven and made their home on the island.

Yamato Katsuragi Hozan-ki (大和葛城宝山記), a work of Shugendō, explains that the Ame-no-Nuboko is a mystical object generated at the time of the creation of heaven and earth that is an incarnation of Bonten, and that it is regarded as a vajra which has the power to smash evil and has another name, Amanomagaeshi-no-hoko. It further explains that Ninigi, the sun goddess's grandson who descended to Earth, is a deity associated with the vajra, a mallet decorated with gems, and that he is Heavenly Pestle Boy (天杵尊, Amagine-Takashi), also known as Kidoku-ō, who has pacified the land with the mallet as a weapon.

Tenchi Reiki Furoku, the book of Ryōbu Shintō, states that Amenosakahoko is the vajra which was stuck in Onogoro Island. Being influenced by these Shinto books, Senguin Himon describes that the grandson of the sun goddess descended from heaven carrying a sacred treasure Ame-no-Nuboko. Based on these descriptions, it has come to be considered that Amenonuboko, that is Amenosakahoko, is on the ground. Other legends describe that Ame-no-Sakahoko was thrown down from heaven by Amaterasu or was transferred from Ōkuninushi to Ninigi.

== See also ==
- Ame-no-ohabari
