= Yakusanoikazuchi =

Eight kami of thunder in Japanese mythology

Yakusanoikazuchi or ikazuchi is a collective name for the eight kami of thunder in Japanese mythology. Each one represents a different type of storm.

Ikazuchi (雷) literally means thunder in Japanese.

== Mythology ==
Some tellings say that the eight deities were from the maggots of Izanami's rotting corpse. Many versions of the Nihon Shoki and the Kojiki state that after Izanagi saw his wife in such a state and fled in terror, Izanami sent the Yomotsu-shikome, 150 warriors, and the eight thunder kami after him.

== List ==
- Fusu-ikazuchi: (Couchant thunder)
- Hono-ikazuchi: (Fire thunder) the Kojiki says that this kami came from Izanami's breasts.
- Kuro-ikazuchi: (Black thunder) The Kojiki says that this deity came from Izanami's belly. However, the Nihon Shoki says that Kuro-ikazuchi was in Izanami's rectum.
- Naru-ikazuchi: (Rumbling thunder)
- Ō-ikazuchi: (Great thunder) both the Kojiki and the Nihon Shoki state that Ō-ikazuchi came from Izanami's head.
- Saku-ikazuchi: (Cleaving thunder)
- Tsuchi-ikazuchi: (Earth thunder)
- Waka-ikazuchi: (Young thunder)
