= Ame-no-ohabari =

Japanese mythological weapon

Genealogy
- Children: Takemikazuchi

Ame-no-Ohabari (Japanese: 天之尾羽; "Heavenly-Point-Blade-Extended") is a sword of Japanese legend and kami in Shinto. He appears in the Kojiki first as a sword wielded by Izanagi to kill his offspring Kagu-tsuchi—giving birth to several other kami such as Takemikazuchi—and later as a kami nominated by Omoikane to descend from Takamagahara to Ashihara no Nakatsukuni, though his son Takemikazuchi is eventually sent instead. While Motoori Norinaga's annotation of the Kojiki states the kami is the spirit of the sword, Basil Hall Chamberlain notes in his translation that there is nothing in the text warranting this interpretation.

When he first appears as the sword, he is referred to as Itsu-no-Ohabari (伊都之尾羽張; "Majestic-Point-Blade-Extended"), then Itsu-no-Ohabari no kami (伊都之尾羽張神) when he later appears as a kami, with the alternate name of Ame-no-Ohabari no kami (天之尾羽) given at the same time.

== See also ==
- Ame-no-Nuboko
