= Mount Hiba (Shimane) =

Mountain in the country of Japan

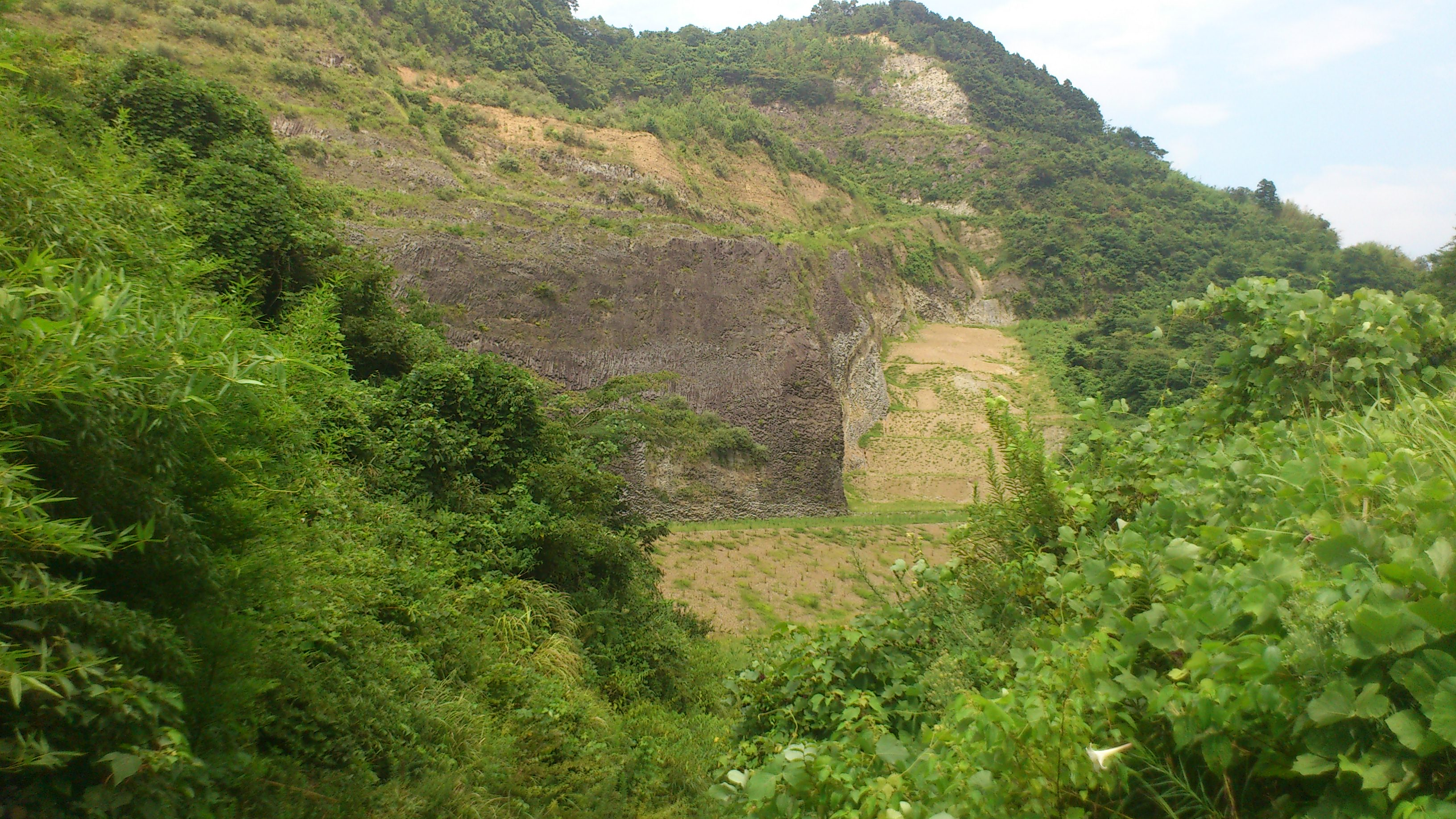

Highest point
- Elevation: 331 m (1,086 ft)
- Coordinates: 35°18′50″N 133°14′12″E

Geography
- Location within Japan
- Location: Hiba-Dogo-Taishaku Quasi-National Park

Mount Hiba (比婆山, Hiba-yama) is a mountain in Yasugi, Shimane Prefecture, Japan, with a height of 331 metres. It is mentioned in Japanese myth as the place where Izanami was buried.

== See also ==
- Mount Hiba (Hiroshima)
