= Kagu-tsuchi =

Japanese fire god

Kagutsuchi
- God of Fire
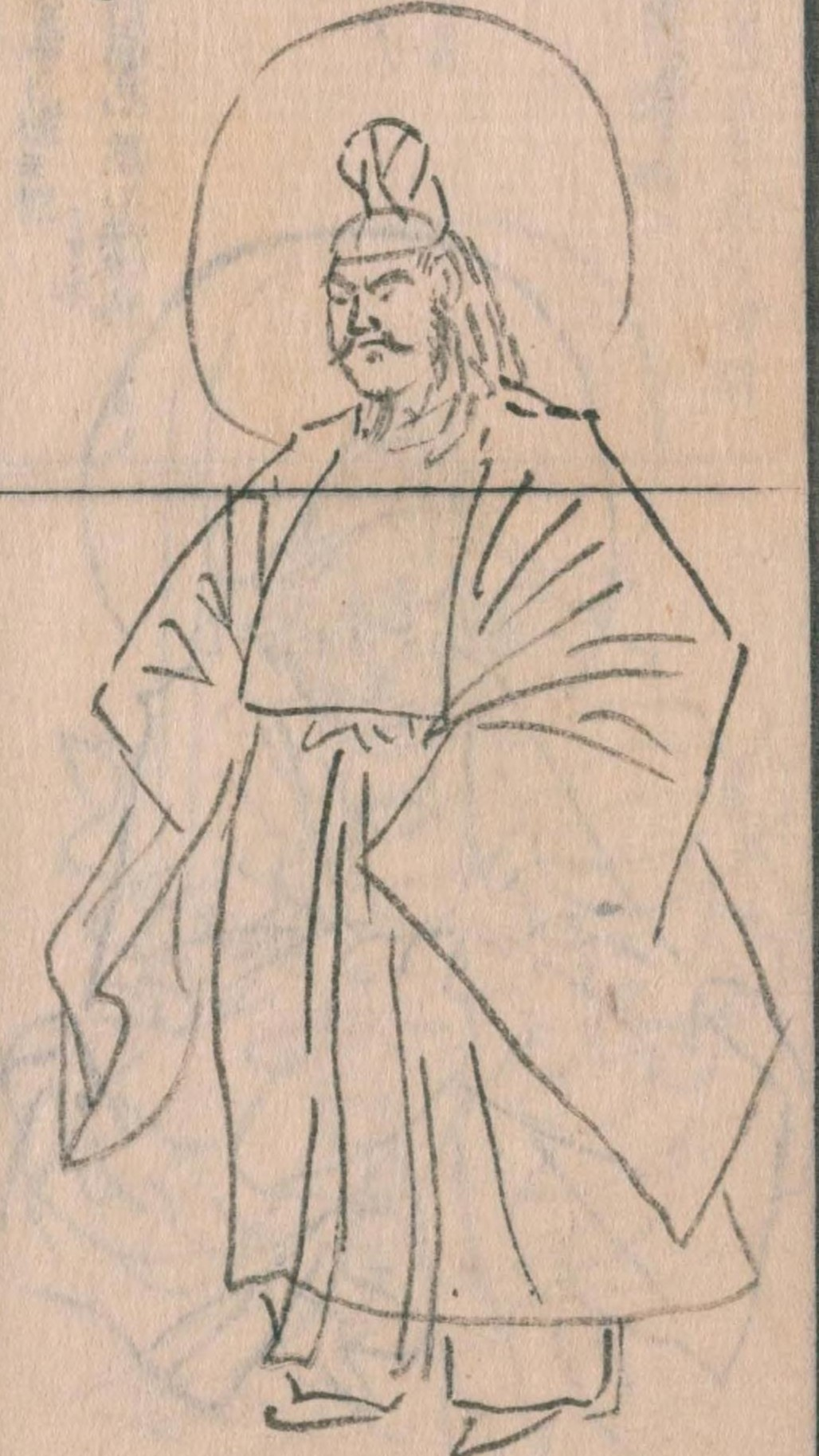
- Other names: Kagutsuchi-no-Mikoto (軻遇突智命, 加具土命); Homusubi (火産霊); Hi-no-Yagihayao-no-Kami (火之夜藝速男神); Hi-no-Yakihayao-no-Mikoto-no-Kami (火焼速男命神); Hi-no-Yakihiko-no-Kami (火焼彦神); Ho-no-Yakezumi-no-Kami (火焼炭神)
- Japanese: 火之迦具土神
- Major cult center: Honoo-Honome Shrine, Ubuta Shrine, Hananoiwaya Shrine, Akiha Shrine, and others
- Gender: Male
- Parents: Izanagi (father); Izanami (mother)
- Offspring: Nesaku, Takemikazuchi, Kuraokami and others

Kagutsuchi (カグツチ; Old Japanese: Kagututi), also known as Hi-no-Kagutsuchi or Homusubi among other names, is the kami of fire in classical Japanese mythology.

== Mythology ==
Kagutsuchi's birth burned his mother Izanami, causing her death. His father Izanagi, in his grief, beheaded Kagutsuchi with his sword, Ame no Ohabari (天之尾羽張), and cut his body into eight pieces, which became eight volcanoes. Kagutsuchi's corpse created numerous deities, which typically includes Watatsumi, Kuraokami, Takemikazuchi, Futsunushi, Amatsu-Mikaboshi, and Ōyamatsumi.

The precise origin of each deity varies between, and even within, the two chief mythological chronicles. According to the Kojiki, the deities Kuraokami, Takaokami, and Kuramitsuha were born from the blood dripping from Ame-no-Ohabari as it struck Kagutsuchi; the Nihon Shoki instead states that Izanagi cut Kagutsuchi into three pieces, from which arose Ikazuchi-no-Kami, Ōyamatsumi, and Takaokami. Blood dripping from the sword's tip onto a mass of rocks (or, per the Nihon Shoki, upon five hundred cliffs) produced the paired deities Iwasaku and Nesaku, and Iwatsutsunoo and Iwatsutsunome; the Nihon Shoki sometimes describing the latter pair as a single deity, Iwatsutsuo. Blood dripping from the sword's hilt, meanwhile, produced the deities Mikahayahi and Hihayahi.

Kagutsuchi's birth, in Japanese mythology, comes at the end of the creation of the world and marks the beginning of death. In the Engishiki, a source which contains the myth, Izanami, in her death throes, bears the water goddess Mizuhanome, instructing her to pacify Kagu-tsuchi if he should become violent. This story also contains references to traditional fire-fighting tools: gourds for carrying water and wet clay and water reeds for smothering fires.

== Name ==
The name Kagutsuchi was originally a compound phrase, consisting of kagu, an Old Japanese root verb meaning "to shine"; tsu, the Old Japanese possessive particle; and chi, an Old Japanese root meaning "force, power".

== See also ==
- Kōjin
- List of fire gods
- Musuhi, part of the etymology of Homusubi
- Takemikazuchi
