= Izanagi =

Deity of Shinto religion

Izanagi-no-Mikoto
- Sky father Primordial god of creation and life
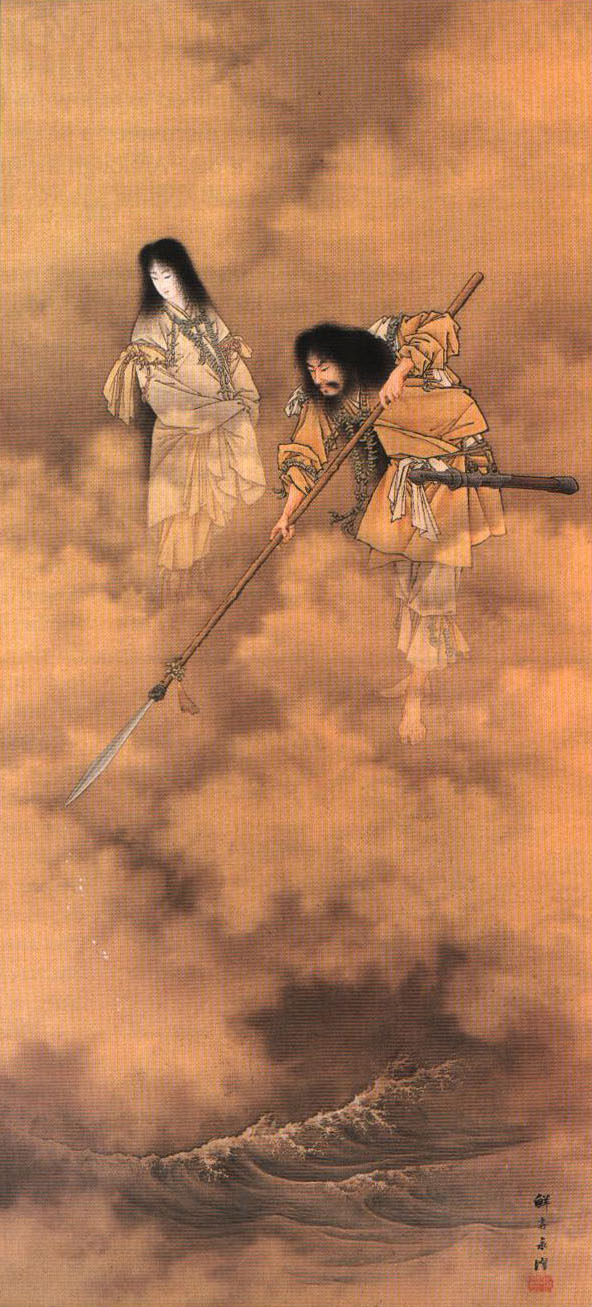
- Searching the Seas with the Tenkei (天瓊を以て滄海を探るの図, Tenkei o motte sōkai o saguru no zu). Painting by Kobayashi Eitaku, 1880-90 (MFA, Boston). Izanagi with the spear Ame-no-Nuboko (Tenkei) to the right, Izanami to the left.
- Other names: Izanagi-no-Kami (伊邪那岐神); Izanagi-no-Ōkami (伊邪那岐大神); Kumano-Hayatama-no-Ōkami (熊野速玉大神)
- Japanese: 伊邪那岐命, 伊耶那岐命, 伊弉諾尊
- Major cult center: Taga Taisha, Izanagi Shrine, Eda Shrine, Kumano Hayatama Taisha, Onokorojima Shrine, Mitsumine Shrine and others
- Texts: Kojiki, Nihon Shoki, Sendai Kuji Hongi
- Region: Japan

Genealogy
- Parents: None (Kojiki, Nihon Shoki); Aokashikine-no-Mikoto (Shoki); Awanagi-no-Mikoto (Shoki); Omodaru and Ayakashikone
- Siblings: Izanami
- Consort: Izanami
- Children: Amaterasu; Tsukuyomi; Susanoo; Hiruko; Kagu-tsuchi (and others)

Izanagi (イザナギ/伊邪那岐/伊弉諾; Japanese pronunciation: [ì.(d͡)zä́.nä́.ɡ̟ʲí, -ŋ̟ʲí]), formally referred to with a divine honorific as Izanagi-no-Mikoto (伊邪那岐命/伊弉諾尊; [ì.(d͡)zä́.nä́.ɡ̟ʲí nó̞ mʲí.kó̞.tó̞, -ŋ̟ʲí]; meaning "He-who-invites" or the "Male-who-invites"), is the creator deity (kami) of both creation and life in Japanese mythology. He and his sister-wife Izanami are the last of the seven generations of primordial deities that manifested after the formation of heaven and earth. Izanagi and Izanami are held to be the creators of the Japanese archipelago and the progenitors of many deities, which include the sun goddess Amaterasu, the moon deity Tsukuyomi, and the storm god Susanoo. He is a god that can be said to be the beginning of the current Japanese imperial family.

== Name ==
His name is given in the Kojiki (c. 712 AD) both as Izanagi-no-Kami (伊邪那岐神) and Izanagi-no-Mikoto (伊邪那岐命), while the Nihon Shoki (720 AD) refers to him as Izanagi-no-Mikoto, with the name written in different characters (伊弉諾尊).

The names Izanagi and Izanami are often interpreted as being derived from the verb izanau (historical orthography izanafu) or iⁿzanap- from Western Old Japanese 'to invite', with -ki / -gi and -mi being taken as masculine and feminine suffixes, respectively. The literal translation of Iⁿzanaŋgî and Iⁿzanamî are 'Male-who-invites' and 'Female-who-invites'. Shiratori Kurakichi proposed an alternative theory which instead sees the root iza- (or rather isa-) to be derived from isao (historical orthography: isawo) meaning 'achievement' or 'merit'. The etymological origin of the verb is suggested to be a precursor to the Middle Korean lemma yènc- meaning 'to place/put on [the top of]' reconstructed as *yenc-a (place-INF) in Old Korean.

== Mythology ==
The first group of primordial deities, the kotoamatsukami, and the seven generations of kami (kamiyonanayo) that emerged after them

=== In the Kojiki ===
==== The birth of the land ====
The Kojiki portrays Izanagi and his younger twin sister Izanami as the seventh and final generation of deities that manifested after the emergence of the first group of gods, the Kotoamatsukami, when heaven and Earth came into existence.

Receiving a command from the other gods to solidify and shape the Earth (which then "[resembled] floating oil and [drifted] like a jellyfish"), the couple use a jewelled spear to churn the watery chaos. The brine that dripped from the tip of the spear congealed and turned into an island named Onogoro (淤能碁呂島). The two descended to the island and, setting up their dwelling, erected a 'heavenly pillar' (ama no mihashira) on it. Izanagi and Izanami, realizing that they were meant to procreate and have children, then devised a marriage ceremony whereby they would walk in opposite directions around the pillar, greet each other and initiate intercourse. After Izanami greeted Izanagi first, Izanagi objected that he, the man, should have been the first to speak. True enough, the first offspring that resulted from their union, the 'leech-child' Hiruko, was considered imperfect and set adrift on a boat of reeds. Izanagi and Izanami then also begat the island of Awa (淡島 Awashima), but this too was not counted among their rightful progeny.

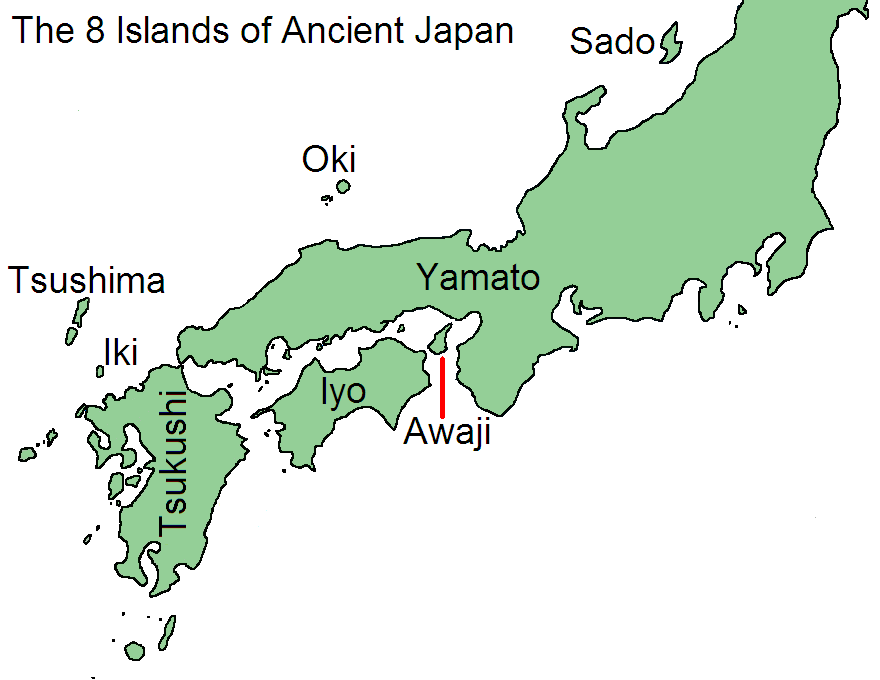
The 'Eight Great Islands' (大八洲 Ōyashima) of Japan begotten by Izanami and Izanagi

Izanagi and Izanami then decided to repeat the ritual, with Izanagi greeting Izanami first. This time, their union was a success, with Izanami giving birth to some of the various islands that comprise the Japanese archipelago (with the notable exceptions of Shikoku and Hokkaido), which include the following eight islands (in the following order):

- Awaji-no-Ho-no-Sawake (淡道之穂之狭別島)
- The double-named island of Iyo (伊予之二名島 Iyo-no-Futana-no-Shima, modern Shikoku)
- The triple islands of Oki (隠伎之三子島 Oki-no-Mitsugo-no-Shima)
- Tsukushi (筑紫島, modern Kyushu)
- Iki (伊伎島)
- Tsushima (津島)
- Sado (佐度島)
- Ōyamato-Toyoakitsushima (大倭豊秋津島, modern Honshu)

The two then proceeded to beget the various deities who are to inhabit these lands. Izanami, however, was badly injured and eventually died after giving birth to the fire god Kagutsuchi. In an act of grief and rage, Izanagi killed Kagutsuchi with his 'ten-grasp sword'. More gods manifest into existence out of Izanami's excreta, Kagutsuchi's blood and mutilated remains, and Izanagi's tears.

==== Descent into Yomi ====
Izanagi, wishing to see Izanami again, went down to Yomi, the land of the dead, in the hopes of retrieving her. Izanami reveals that she had already partaken of food cooked in the furnace of the underworld, rendering her return impossible. Izanagi, losing his patience, betrayed his promise not to look at her and lit up a fire, only to find that Izanami is now a rotting corpse, causing him to run away in terror. To avenge her shame, Izanami dispatched the gods of thunder (known as the Yakusanoikazuchi), the "hags of Yomi" (予母都志許売 Yomotsu-shikome), and a horde of warriors to chase after him. To distract them, Izanagi threw the vine securing his hair and the comb on his right hair-knot, which turned into grapes and bamboo shoots that the hags devoured. Upon reaching the pass of Yomotsu Hirasaka (黄泉比良坂, the 'Flat Slope of Yomi'), Izanagi took three peaches from a nearby tree and repelled his pursuers using them. He then declared the peach fruit to be divine, naming them Ōkamuzumi, and bade it to grow in the land of the living to help people in need, just as it had helped him. When Izanami herself came in pursuit of him, Izanagi sealed the entrance to Yomi using a huge boulder, which itself became a deity, known as Yomido ni Sayarimasu no Ōkami, or by the alternate name Chigaeshi no Kami recorded in both the Kojiki and the Nihon Shoki, since worshipped as a guardian deity of roads and borders (sai no kami). Izanami then pronounced a curse, vowing to kill a thousand people each day, to which Izanagi replies that he would then beget a thousand and five hundred people everyday to thwart her.

==== Purification (Misogi) ====
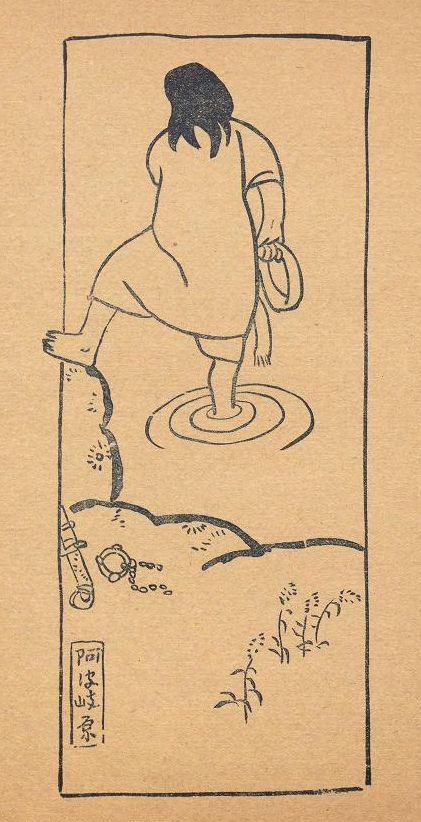
Izanagi purifying himself (misogi) by immersing in a river (Natori Shunsen)

Izanagi, feeling contaminated by his visit to Yomi, went to "[the plain of] Awagihara (i.e. a plain covered with awagi) by the river-mouth of Tachibana in Himuka in [the island of] Tsukushi" and purified himself by bathing in the river; various deities came into existence as he stripped off his clothes and accouterments and immersed himself in the water. The three most important kami, the "Three Precious Children" (三貴子 mihashira no uzu no miko or sankishi) – the sun goddess Amaterasu Ōmikami, the moon deity Tsukuyomi-no-Mikoto, and the storm god Susanoo-no-Mikoto – were born when Izanagi washed his left eye, his right eye, and his nose, respectively.

==== Izanagi and Susanoo ====
Izanagi divides the world among his three children: Amaterasu was allotted Takamagahara (高天原, the "Plain of High Heaven"), Tsukuyomi the night, and Susanoo the seas. Susanoo did not perform his appointed task and instead kept crying and howling "until his beard eight hands long extended down over his chest," causing the mountains to wither and the rivers to dry up. After he told his father that he wished to go to his mother's land, Ne-no-Katasu-Kuni (根堅州国, the 'Land of Roots'), a furious Izanagi expelled Susanoo "with a divine expulsion," after which he disappears from the narrative.

=== In the Nihon Shoki ===
While the first generations of kami including Izanagi and Izanami are implied in the Kojiki and the Nihon Shoki's main narrative to have manifested independent of each other, one variant cited in the Shoki instead describes them as the offspring of Aokashikine-no-Mikoto (青橿城根尊), another name for the goddess Ayakashikone-no-Mikoto, of the sixth of the first seven generations of gods. Another variant meanwhile portrays Izanagi as the offspring of a deity named Awanagi-no-Mikoto (沫蕩尊) and the fifth-generation descendant of the primordial deity Kuninotokotachi-no-Mikoto.

In the Shoki's main narrative, the couple first begets the following eight islands after performing the marriage ceremony (in the following order):

- Awaji (淡路洲), which "was reckoned as the placenta, and their minds took no pleasure in it"
- Ōyamato-Toyoakitsushima (大日本豊秋津洲)
- The double-named island of Iyo (伊豫二名洲)
- Tsukushi (筑紫洲)
- Oki (億岐洲) and Sado (佐度洲), born as twins
- Koshi (越洲), what is now known as the Hokuriku region
- Ōshima (大洲), identified with the island of Suō-Ōshima in Yamaguchi Prefecture
- Kibi-no-Kojima (吉備子洲), identified with the Kojima Peninsula in southern Okayama Prefecture (formerly the province of Kibi)

Both Ōshima and Kibi-no-Kojima are not reckoned among the eight great islands in the Kojiki, instead being identified as being born after them. The other remaining islands, such as Tsushima (対馬島) and Iki (壱岐島), are said to have been produced by the coagulation of the foam in sea water (or freshwater).

== In Tenrikyo ==
In Tenrikyo, Izanagi-no-Mikoto is one of the Ten Aspects of God's Providence (十全の守護, jūzen no shugo).

== Genealogy ==
Kuni no Tokotachi
Toyokumono
Uhijini	Suhijini
Tsunugui	Ikugui
Otonoji	Otonobe
Omodaru	Ayakashikone
Izanagi	Izanami

== See also ==
- Ame-no-ohabari
- God in Tenrikyo (with Izanagi-no-Mikoto being one of the 10 aspects of God's providence)
- Ishana
- Izanagi Plate
- Pangu – Chinese creator god, who also created the sun and the moon from his eyes.
- Shinto in popular culture
- Twins in mythology

== Bibliography ==
- Aston, William George (1896). Nihongi: Chronicles of Japan from the Earliest Times to A.D. 697. London: Kegan Paul, Trench, Trübner & Co.
- Chamberlain, Basil H. (1882). A Translation of the "Ko-Ji-Ki," or "Records of Ancient Matters". Yokohama: Lane, Crawford & Co.
- Philippi, Donald L., tr. (1968/1969). Kojiki. University of Tokyo Press. ISBN 978-0691061603.
