= Izanami =

Goddess of Shinto religion

Izanami-no-Mikoto
- Primordial goddess of creation and death
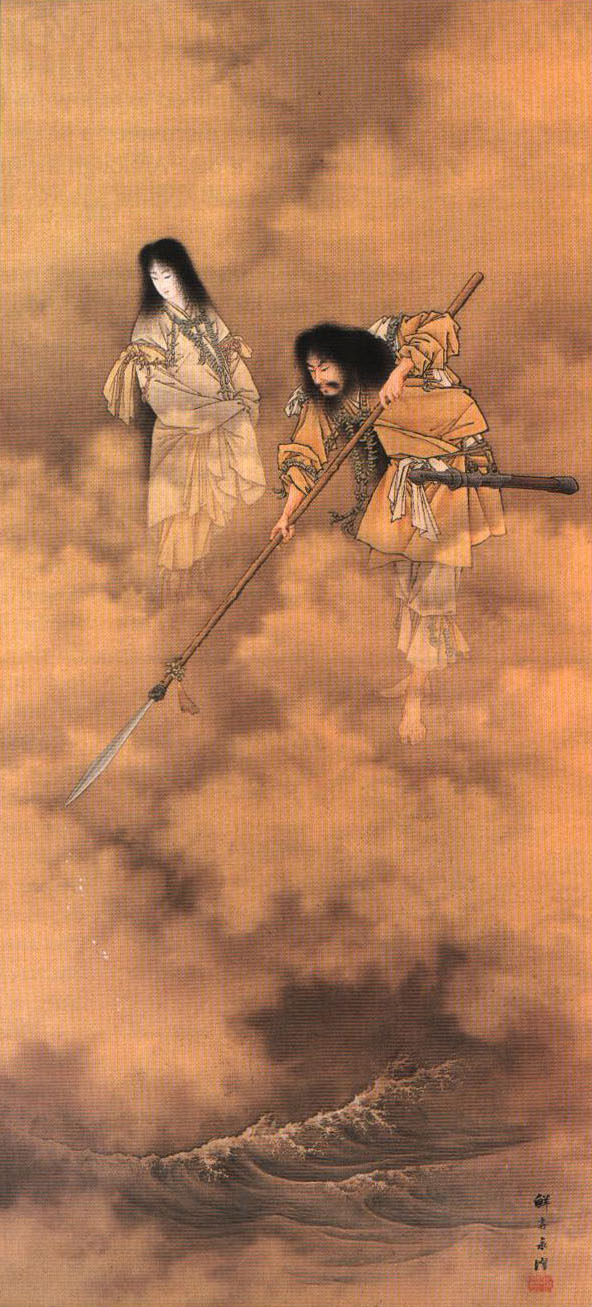
- Searching the Seas with the Tenkei (天瓊を以て滄海を探るの図, Tenkei o motte sōkai o saguru no zu). Painting by Kobayashi Eitaku, 1880-90 (MFA, Boston). Izanagi with the spear Amenonuhoko to the right, Izanami to the left.
- Other names: Izanami-no-Kami (伊弉冉神) Izanami-no-Mikoto (伊邪那美命) Yomotsu Okami (黄泉津大神) Chishiki no Okami (道敷大神)
- Japanese: 伊邪那美
- Major cult center: Taga Taisha
- Texts: Kojiki, Nihon Shoki, Sendai Kuji Hongi
- Gender: Female
- Region: Japan

Genealogy
- Parents: None (Kojiki, Nihon Shoki); Aokashikine-no-Mikoto (Shoki); Awanagi-no-Mikoto (Shoki); Omodaru and Ayakashikone.
- Siblings: Izanagi
- Consort: Izanagi
- Children: Amaterasu; Tsukuyomi; Susanoo; Hiruko; Kagu-tsuchi (and others)

Izanami (イザナミ; Japanese pronunciation: [ì.(d͡)zä́.nä́.mʲí]), formally referred to with the honorific Izanami-no-Mikoto (伊弉冉尊/伊邪那美命; [ì.(d͡)zä́.nä́.mʲí nó̞ mʲí.kó̞.tó̞]; meaning "She-who-invites" or the "Female-who-invites"), is the creator of both creation and death in Japanese mythology, as well as the Shinto mother goddess. She and her brother-husband Izanagi are the last of the seven generations of primordial deities that manifested after the formation of heaven and earth. Izanami and Izanagi are held to be the creators of the Japanese archipelago and the progenitors of many deities, which include the sun goddess Amaterasu, the moon deity Tsukuyomi and the storm god Susanoo. In mythology, she is the direct ancestor of the Japanese imperial family. In Shinto and Japanese mythology, Izanami gave humans death, so she is sometimes seen as a shinigami.

== Name ==
Her name is given in the Kojiki (c. 712 AD) both as Izanami-no-Kami (伊弉冉神) and Izanami-no-Mikoto (伊邪那美命), while the Nihon Shoki (720 AD) refers to her as Izanami-no-Mikoto, with the name written in different characters (伊弉冉尊).

The names Izanagi (Izanaki) and Izanami are often interpreted as being derived from the verb izanau (historical orthography izanafu) or iⁿzanap- from Western Old Japanese 'to invite', with -ki / -gi and -mi being taken as masculine and feminine suffixes, respectively. The literal translation of Iⁿzanaŋgî and Iⁿzanamî are 'Male-who-invites' and 'Female-who-invites'. Shiratori Kurakichi proposed an alternative theory which instead sees the root iza- (or rather isa-) to be derived from isao (historical orthography: isawo) meaning 'achievement' or 'merit'.

== Goddess of creation ==
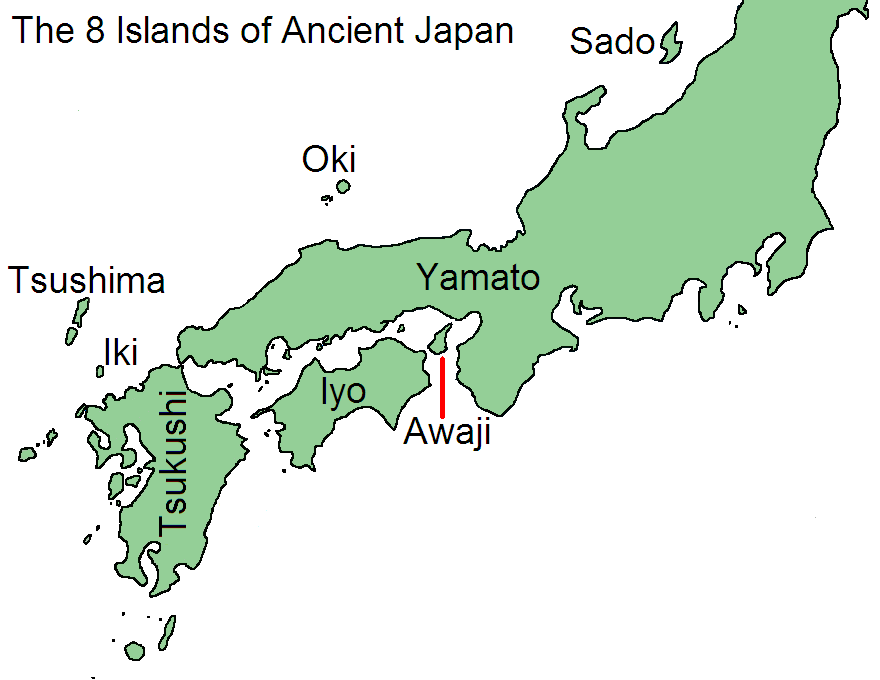
The 'Eight Great Islands' (大八洲 Ōyashima) of Japan begotten by Izanami and Izanagi

The first gods Amenominakanushi and Kunitokotachi summoned two divine beings into existence, the male Izanagi and the female Izanami, and charged them with creating the first land. To help them do this, Izanagi and Izanami were given a spear decorated with jewels, named Amenonuhoko (heavenly spear). The two deities then went to the bridge between heaven and earth, Ame-no-ukihashi ("floating bridge of heaven"), and churned the sea below with the spear. When drops of salty water fell from the spear, Onogoroshima was created. They descended from the bridge of heaven and made their home on the island.

Eventually, they wished to copulate, so they built a pillar called Ame-no-mihashira (天の御柱,"pillar of heaven"; the mi- is an honorific prefix) and around it they built a palace called Yahiro-dono (八尋殿, one hiro is approximately 1.82 m, so the "eight-hiro-palace" would have been 14.56 m. In reality, "ya, was a sacred number to the Japanese, and may often be translated as 'myriad'"). Izanagi and Izanami circled the pillar in opposite directions and, when they met on the other side, Izanami spoke first in greeting. Izanagi did not think that it was proper for the wife to speak first, but they copulated anyways. They had two children: Hiruko ("leech-child"), who later came to be known in Shinto as the god Ebisu, and Awashima ("island of foam"). However, they were born deformed and were not recognized as the pair's legitimate children.

They put the children into a boat and set them out to sea, then petitioned the other gods for an answer as to what they did wrong. They were told that the male deity should have spoken first in greeting during the marriage ceremony. So Izanagi and Izanami went around the pillar again, this time Izanagi speaking first when they met, and their marriage was finally successful.

From their union were born the Ōyashima, or the "great eight islands" of the Japanese chain:

- Awaji
- Iyo (later Shikoku)
- Oki
- Tsukushi (later Kyūshū)
- Iki
- Tsushima
- Sado
- Yamato (later Honshū)

Note that Hokkaido, Chishima and Okinawa were not part of Japan in ancient times.

They bore six more islands and many deities. Izanami died giving birth to the child Kagu-tsuchi ("incarnation of fire") or Ho-Musubi ("causer of fire"). She was then buried on Mt. Hiba, at the border of the old provinces of Izumo and Hōki, near modern-day Yasugi of Shimane Prefecture. Izanagi was so angry at the death of his wife that he killed the newborn child, thereby creating dozens of deities.

== In the Kojiki ==
The Kojiki talks of the death of Izanami and her tomb, which was located at the boundary between country Izumo and Hōki. It implies that Izanami transferred her soul to an animal and a human before her death, but does not state whether or not Izanami had incarnations.

== Death and the underworld ==
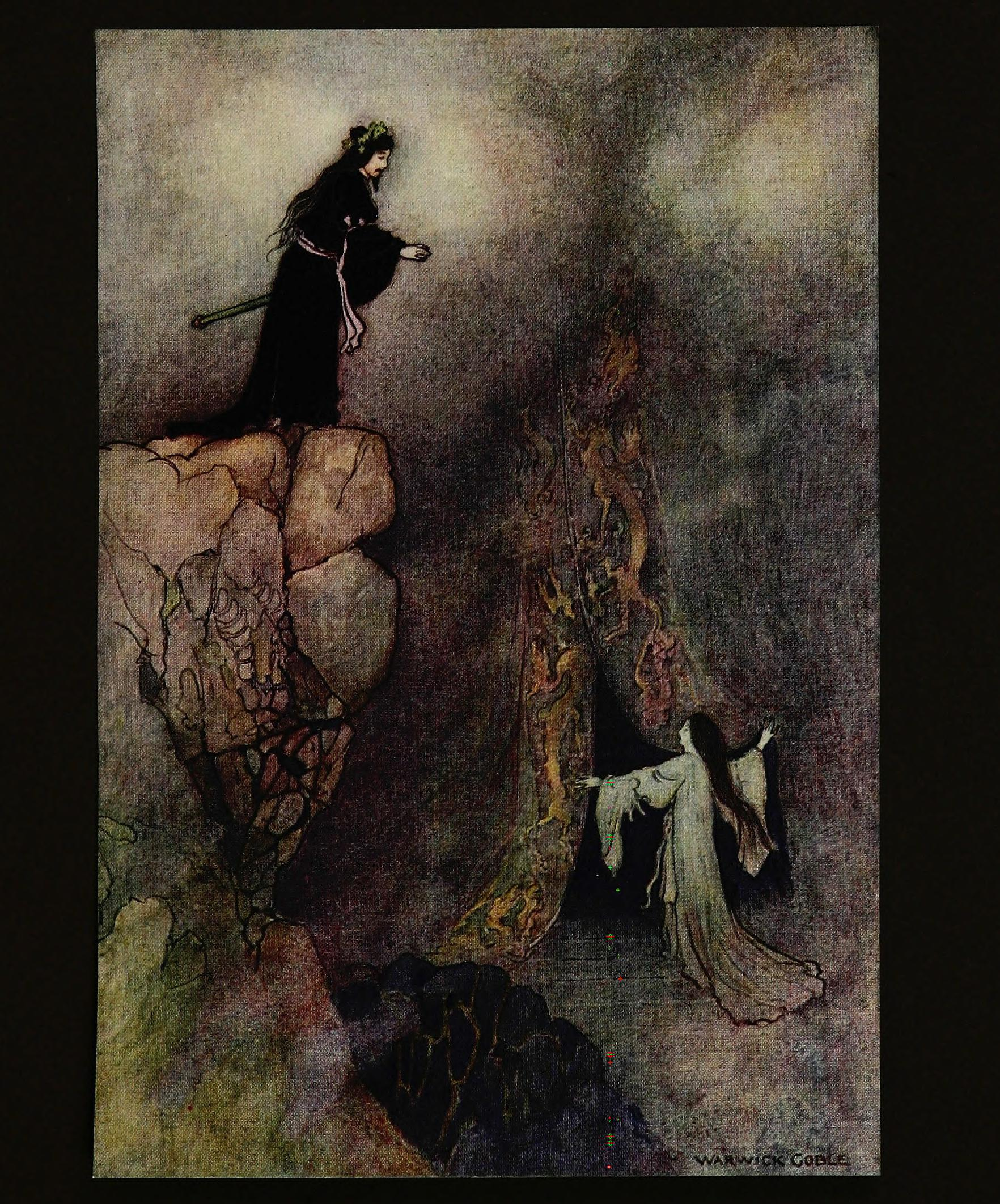
Izanagi and Izanami in Yomi.

Izanagi-no-Mikoto lamented the death of Izanami-no-Mikoto and undertook a journey to Yomi ("the shadowy land of the dead"). He searched for Izanami-no-Mikoto and found her. At first, Izanagi-no-Mikoto could not see her for the shadows hid her appearance. He asked her to return with him. Izanami-no-Mikoto informed Izanagi-no-Mikoto that he was too late. She had already eaten the food of the underworld and was now one with the land of the dead. She could no longer return to the living but would try to ask for permission to leave.

The news shocked Izanagi-no-Mikoto, but he refused to leave her in Yomi. While Izanami-no-Mikoto was sleeping, he took the comb that bound his long hair and set it alight as a torch. Under the sudden burst of light, he saw the horrid form of the once beautiful and graceful Izanami-no-Mikoto. She was now a rotting form of flesh with maggots and foul creatures running over her ravaged body.

Crying out loud, Izanagi-no-Mikoto could no longer control his fear and started to run, intending to return to the living and abandon his death-ridden wife. Izanami-no-Mikoto woke up, shrieking and indignant, and chased after him. She also sent Yakusa-no-ikazuchi-no-kami (demons who are like Raijin) and shikome (foul women) to hunt for Izanagi-no-Mikoto and bring him back to Yomi. Izanagi declared the peaches to be divine, naming them Ōkamuzumi, and instructed them to aid the people of the living world in their moments of distress, just as they had aided him.

Izanagi-no-Mikoto burst out of the entrance and pushed a boulder in the mouth of the Yomotsuhirasaka (黄泉津平坂; cavern that was the entrance of Yomi) to create a separation between the world of the living and the world of the dead, as well as separating Izanagi from Izanami.The boulder itself became a deity, known in both the Kojiki and Nihon Shoki as Yomido ni Sayarimasu no Ōkami, or by the alternate name Chigaeshi no Kami, and worshipped since as a guardian deity of roads and borders (sai no kami).

Izanami-no-Mikoto screamed from behind this impenetrable barricade and told Izanagi-no-Mikoto that if he left her she would destroy 1,000 residents of the living every day. He furiously replied he would give life to 1,500 residents.

Izanagi is said to have performed ritualistic cleansing, harai, after witnessing the decomposing body of his wife. This is the traditional explanation for the purification rituals often performed at Shinto shrines in Japanese religion, where shrine-goers wash themselves with water before entering the sacred space. While he bathed, Izanagi gave birth to the sun goddess, Amaterasu, from his left eye, the moon god, Tsukuyomi, from his right eye, and the storm god, Susanoo, from his nose.

== In the Nihonshoki ==
While similar in many aspects, the version of the tale of Izanagi and Izanami in the Nihonshoki differs from the Kojiki version in that Izanagi does not descend into the Underworld (Yomi), instead residing permanently on the island of Awaji in a temple. Additionally, in the Nihonshoki, the three deities Amaterasu, Tsukiyomi, and Susanoo were said to have been created by both Izanagi and Izanami, instead of Izanagi alone.

== In Tenrikyo ==
In Tenrikyo, Izanami-no-Mikoto is one of the Ten Aspects of God's Providence (十全の守護, jūzen no shugo).

== Genealogy ==
The first group of primordial deities, the kotoamatsukami, and the seven generations of kami (kamiyonanayo) that emerged after them

Kuni no Tokotachi
Toyokumono
Uhijini	Suhijini
Tsunugui	Ikugui
Otonoji	Otonobe
Omodaru	Ayakashikone
Izanagi	Izanami

== See also ==
- Atago Gongen
- Baba Yaga
- God in Tenrikyo (with Izanami-no-Mikoto being one of the 10 aspects of God's providence)
- Ishana
- Mount Hiba
- Orpheus and Eurydice
- Persephone
- Shinto in popular culture
- Twins in mythology

== Bibliography ==
- 七会静 (2009). よくわかる「世界の死神」事典. 廣済堂文庫. 廣済堂. ISBN 978-4-331-65459-0.
- Chamberlain, Basil Hall (2008). The Kojiki: Japanese Records of Ancient Matters. Forgotten Books. ISBN 978-1-60506-938-8.
- Reader, Ian (2008). Simple Guides: Shinto. Kuperard. pp. 53–55. ISBN 978-1-85733-433-3.
