= Amatsukami =

Shinto sky and heaven kami

Amatsukami (Japanese: 天津神, 天つ神; 'Kami of heaven'), also called tenjin, is a category of kami in Japanese mythology. Generally speaking, it refers to kami born in, or residing in, Takamagahara.

Amatsukami is one of the three categories of kami, along with their earthly counterpart Kunitsukami (国津神, 国つ神), and yaoyorozu-no-kami (八百万の神).

In the time of Ninigi the ownership of land was moved from Kunitsukami to Amatsukami.

== Mythology ==
Amatsukami refers to kami residing in Takamagahara, along with kami who were born in Takamagahara but later descended to Japan. In the mythological event of kuni-yuzuri, the descendants of amatsukami descended to pacify the world, which was occupied by the kunitsukami.

Susanoo-no-Mikoto, who was cast out of Takamagahara, and his descendants, such as Ōkuninushi, are considered to be Kunitsugami.

== List of amatsukami ==
- Kotoamatsukami
  - Amenominakanushi
  - Takamimusubi
  - Kamimusubi
  - Umashiashikabihikoji
  - Amenotokotachi
- Kamiyonanayo
  - Kuninotokotachi
  - Toyokumonu
  - Suhijini and Uhijini
  - Tsunuguhi and Ikuguhi
  - Otonoji and Otonobe
  - Omodaru and Ayakashikone
  - Izanagi and Izanami
- Shusaishin
  - Amaterasu
- Others
  - Ame no Hohi
  - Ame-no-Koyane
  - Ame-no-oshihomimi
  - Ame-no-Tajikarao
  - Ame-no-Uzume
  - Ame no Wakahiko
  - Futodama
  - Ninigi-no-Mikoto
  - Omoikane
  - Takemikazuchi
  - Tamanooya-no-Mikoto

== See also ==
- Aesir and Vanir
- Heavenly and Earthly crimes
