= Japanese creation myth =

Table illustrating the kami that appeared during the creation of Heaven and Earth according to Japanese mythology.

In Japanese mythology, the Tenchi-kaibyaku (天地開闢; Literally "Creation of Heaven & Earth") is the story that describes the legendary birth of the celestial and creative world, the birth of the first gods, and the birth of the Japanese archipelago.

This story is described at the beginning of the Kojiki, the first book written in Japan (712), and in the Nihon Shoki (720). Both form the literary basis of Japanese mythology and Shinto; however, the story differs in some aspects between these works.

== Myth ==
At the beginning the universe was immersed in a beaten kind of matter (chaos) in the shape of an egg, sunk in silence. Later there were sounds indicating the movement of particles. With this movement, the light and the lightest particles rose but the particles were not as fast as the light and could not go higher. Thus, the light was at the top of the Universe, and below it, the particles formed first the clouds and then Heaven, which was to be called Takamagahara (高天原; "High Plain of Heaven"). The rest of the particles that had not risen formed a huge mass, dense and dark, to be called Earth.

When Takamagahara was formed, a small plant was formed and from this small plant the first three gods appeared:

- Ame no Minakanushi (天之御中主神, Lord of the August Center of Heaven)
- Takamimusubi (高御産巣日神, Exalted Generative Force)
- Kamimusubi (神産巣日神, Sacred Generative Force).

Then these gods:

- Umashiashikabihikoji (宇摩志阿斯訶備比古遅神, Elderly Prince Reed-Shoot)
- Ame no Tokotachi (天之常立神, Ever-Standing Heaven)

These five deities, known as Kotoamatsukami, appeared spontaneously, did not have a definite sex, did not have partners (hitorigami) and went into hiding after their emergence. These gods are not mentioned in the rest of the mythology.

=== Kamiyonanayo ===
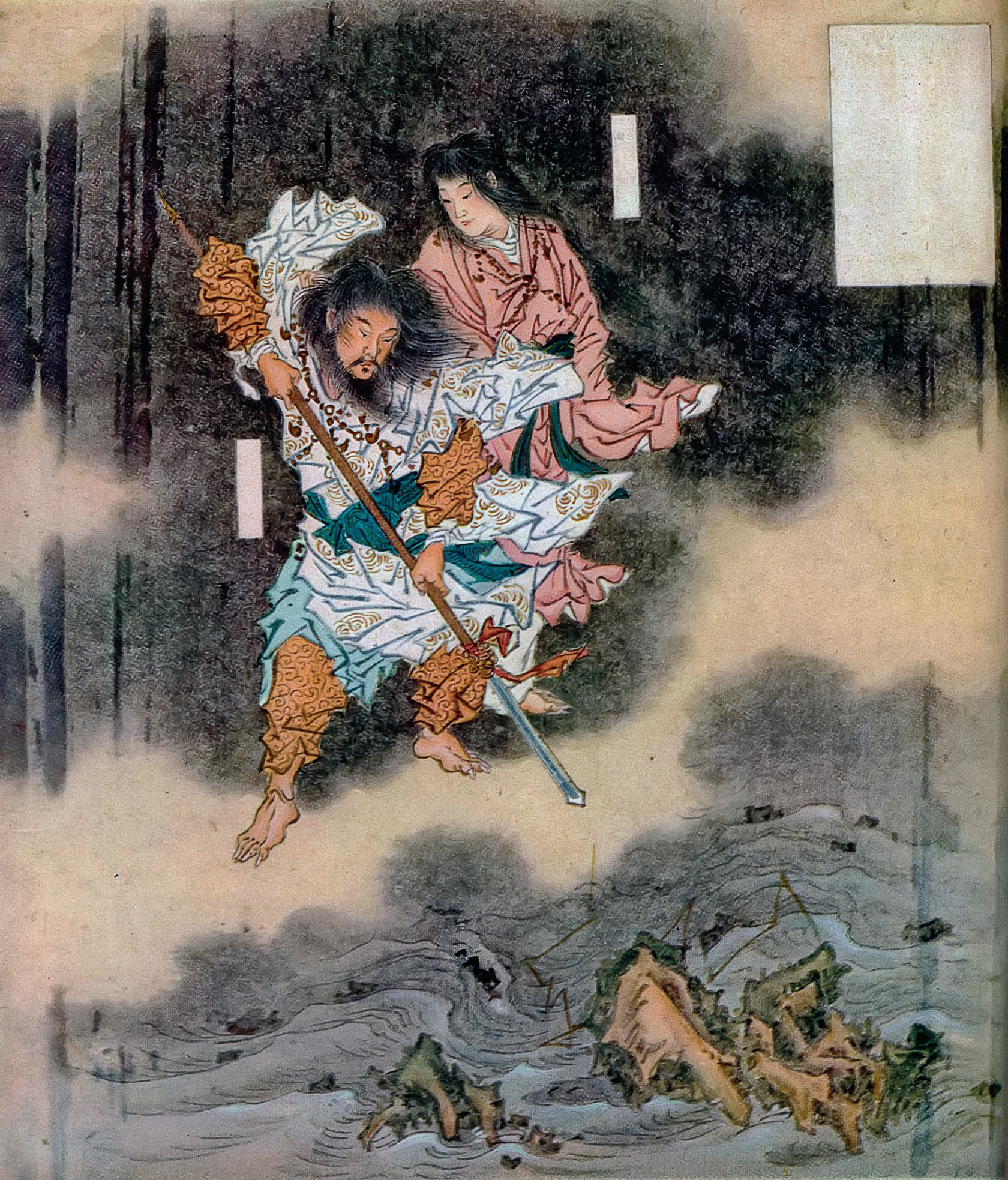
Izanagi and Izanami giving birth to Japan

Then two other gods arose:

- Kuni no Tokotachi (国之常立神, Eternally Standing Land)
- Toyokumono (豊雲野神, Abundant Clouds Moor)

These gods also emerged spontaneously, did not have a defined sex, did not have a partner, and hid at birth.

Then, five pairs of gods were born (for a total of ten deities), each pair consisting of a male deity and a female deity:

- Uhijini (宇比地邇神) and his younger sister-wife Suhijini (須比智邇神),
- Tsunugui (角杙神) and his younger sister-wife Ikugui (活杙神),
- Ōtonoji (意富斗能地神) and his younger sister-wife Ōtonobe (大斗乃弁神),
- Omodaru (於母陀流神) and his younger sister-wife Ayakashikone (阿夜訶志古泥神) and
- Izanagi (伊邪那岐神) and his younger sister-wife Izanami (伊邪那美神)

All deities from Kuni no Tokotachi to Izanami are collectively called Kamiyonanayo (神世七代; "Seven Divine Generations").

Following the creation of Heaven and Earth and the appearance of these primordial gods, Izanagi and Izanami went on to create the Japanese archipelago (Kuniumi) by stirring the ocean with a spear, then the matter that dripped off of the spear solidified and became an island, and they also gave birth to a large number of gods (Kamiumi). One of these gods being Amaterasu (the sun goddess of the Shinto religion).

== See also ==
- Creation myth
- Tenrikyo creation myth
