= Kamimusubi =

God of creation in Japanese mythology

- Kotoamatsukami
- Creation of the world according to the Kojiki, showing the five primordial gods (kotoamatsukami) and the subsequent seven generations of deities (kamiyonanayo)
- Other names: Kamimusuhi, Kamumusubi
- Japanese: 神産巣日神
- Texts: Kojiki, Nihon Shoki, Izumo-no-kuni Fudoki

Genealogy
- Parents: None; self-generated
- Children: Ame-no-Koyane; Kisagaihime and Umugihime; Sukunabikona; Ame no Ikutama

Kamimusubi (神産巣日, lit. "Sacred Generative Force"), also known as Kamimusuhi among other variants, is a kami and god of creation in Japanese mythology. They are a hitorigami, and the third of the first three kami to come into existence (Kotoamatsukami), alongside Ame-no-Minakanushi and Takamimusubi, forming a trio at the beginning of all creation. The name is composed of kami, denoting deity, and musubi, meaning "effecting force of creation".

== Mythology ==
At the time of the creation of heaven and earth, Kamimusubi was in Takamagahara next to Ame-no-Minakanushi and Takamimusubi.

In Kojiki, Kamimusubi is an ancestral god who sits in Takamagahara and assists the gods of Izumo, and is called "Mi-Oya" (honorfic name for ancestor) by other gods. Kamimusubi became the ancestral god of the five grains (progenitors) after Kamimusubi transformed the grains produced from the body of Ōgetsu-hime, the goddess of food, who was killed by Susanoo, the god of storms.

At the beginning of the text, it is said that Kamimusubi is a genderless hitorigami, but when Ōkuninushi is killed by Yasogami(八十神), his mother, Sashikuniwakahime(刺国若比売), makes a request to Kamimusubi. However, here, Kamimusubi is considered a goddess because Kisagaihime and Umugihime were healed by "mother's milk".

Since the Izumo gods are not mentioned in Nihon Shoki, Kamimusubi exists only as a kinematic pair of Takamimusubi.

In Izumo-no-kuni Fudoki, Kamimusubi appears as the ancestor of the Tochi-gami (land gods) who appear as the origin of the name of Shimane Peninsula . Many of the Tochi-gami, such as Kisagaihime and Umugihime, are goddesses, and it is thought that Kamimusubi is the mother goddess in the genealogy of a matriarchal society.

Kamimusubi is considered in many versions to be the mother of Sukunabikona. Sukunabikona would later assist Ōkuninushi with the development of the land.

While being an Amatsukami ('Kami of heaven'), Kamimusubi has a strong connection to Kunitsukami ('Kami of land') in Izumo tradition. Because of this, it is also theorized that Kamimusubi was a kami of the Izumo clan.

== Analysis ==
In the early Heian period, Kogo Shūi describes Kamimusubi as the ancestor of the Ki clan.

During the medieval and early modern periods, Motoori Norinaga in his commentary on the Kojiki wrote that Kamimusubi and Takamimusubi are the “First Ancestors of heaven and earth, of the kami, and of all existence”, placing greater importance on them over Ame-no-Minakanushi. This viewpoint challenged the belief of the Watari Priesthood, which was that Ame-no-Minakanushi was more important than Kamimusubi and Takamimusubi because they were created first. His reasoning is that Kamimusubi and Takamimusubi are the two kami of production, and thus:

Each and every thing in the world, from heaven and earth to its manifold beings and phenomena, one and all, came to be from the productive spirit [musubi ] of these two great kami of production, so that even though manifold kami are in the world, it is these [two] kami that are particularly esteemed for the blessed virtue [mimegumi] of their productive spirit. It is they, of all others, which should be worshiped with highest esteem.

Hirata Atsutane describes Kamimusubi and Takamimusubi in a similar way, as the "ultimate natural ancestral kami of human beings", portraying them as "our great natural parent deities", giving birth to Izanagi and Izanami.

== Genealogy ==
There are no records of a spouse for Kamimusubi, but several children are mentioned.

=== Children ===
- Ame-no-Koyane
- Kisagaihime and Umugihime
- Sukunabikona
- Ame no Ikutama

== See also ==
- Family tree of Japanese deities
- Musuhi
