= Kuni-yuzuri =

Japanese prehistoric mythological event

The kuni-yuzuri (国譲り) "Transfer of the land" was a mythological event in Japanese prehistory, related in sources such as the Kojiki and the Nihon Shoki. It relates the story of how the rulership of Japan passed from the earthly kami (kunitsukami) to the kami of Heaven (amatsukami) and their eventual descendants, the Imperial House of Japan. (Note: In Japanese mythology, the gods who reside in the Plain of High Heaven (Takamagahara) such as Amaterasu are collectively called amatsukami (天津神; "heavenly gods"), while the deities who dwell on the earth / the land of Japan (Ashihara-no-Nakatsukuni) such as Ōkuninushi are called kunitsukami (国津神; "earthly gods" or "regional gods"))

== Background ==
The Kojiki and the Nihon Shoki both relate that the Japanese archipelago were created by the primordial couple Izanagi and Izanami, who also brought forth many gods into existence, three of which – Amaterasu, Tsukuyomi and Susanoo – were appointed to govern the sky (Takamagahara, the 'Plain of High Heaven'), the night, and the seas, respectively.

Susanoo, expelled by Izanagi either because he refused to perform his allotted task of ruling the sea (Kojiki) or his impetuous nature (Nihon Shoki), went to Takamagahara to see his sister. Suspected of insurrection, Susanoo protested his innocence, at which the two gods underwent a trial by pledge, giving birth to five male kami (Amaterasu's sons) and three female kami (Susanoo's daughters) when each chewed and spat out an object carried by the other (Amaterasu Susanoo's ten-span sword, Susanoo Amaterasu's magatama beads).

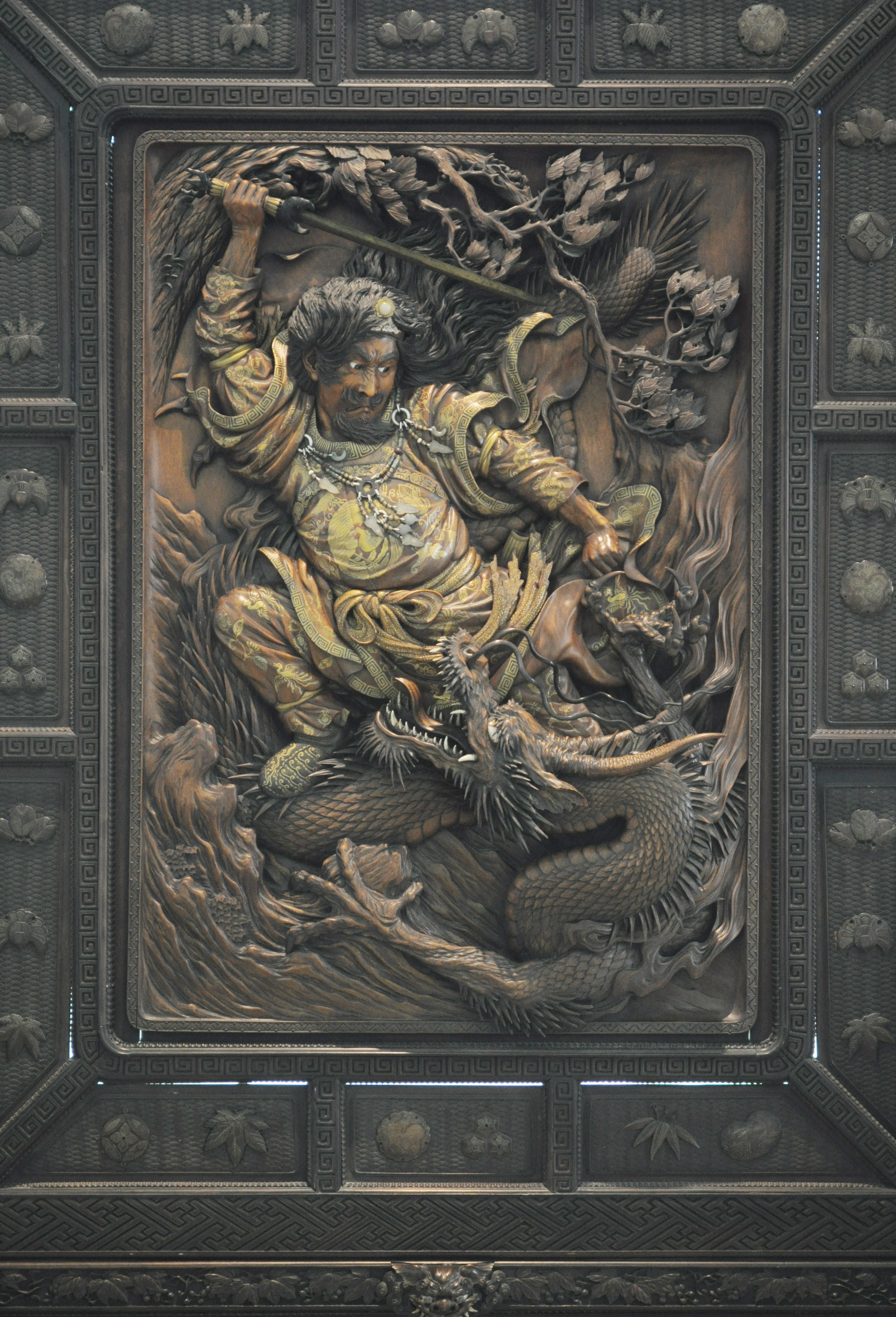
Susanoo fighting the Yamata no Orochi.

Declaring himself winner of the trial, Susanoo then began to wreak havoc upon Takagamahara, causing Amaterasu to hide herself in the Ama-no-Iwato, plunging heaven and earth into darkness. Though Amaterasu was eventually persuaded to come out of the cave, Susanoo was banished a second time as punishment for his misdeeds. He then came down to Ashihara-no-Nakatsukuni (the 'Central Land of Reed Plains', i.e. the earthly land of Japan), to the land of Izumo, where he slew the eight-headed serpent Yamata-no-Orochi and married Kushinada-hime. At length, Susanoo went to the underworld (Ne-no-kuni) to become its ruler.

A son (Nihon Shoki) or descendant (Kojiki) of Susanoo, Ōnamuji, married the goddess Yagami-hime of Inaba Province, earning the jealousy of his eighty brothers, who were seeking for her hand in marriage. Seeking refuge in Ne-no-kuni after his brothers had made attempts on his life, Ōnamuji met Susanoo's daughter Suseri-bime, with whom he immediately fell in love with. Upon learning of their affair, Susanoo imposes four trials on Ōnamuji, each of which he overcame with Suseri-bime's help. Taking his new wife Suseri-bime, as well as Susanoo's sword, koto, and bow and arrow back with him, Ōnamuji – now called Ōkuninushi (大国主 'Master of the Great Land') – defeats his wicked brothers, thereby becoming the lord of Ashihara-no-Nakatsukuni.

Upon subduing his brothers, Ōkuninushi takes a third wife, Nunakawa-hime of Koshi, causing his second (now chief) wife Suseri-bime to become jealous. Ōkuninushi then begins the task of creating the land (kuni-zukuri) started by Izanagi and Izanami, being helped in his task by a dwarf named Sukunahikona, a son of the primordial deity Takamimusubi (Nihon Shoki) or Kamimusubi (Kojiki). Together they made the lands habitable and invented means of dispelling various diseases and calamities such as medicine and magic.

== Plot ==
=== Ame-no-oshihomimi ===
In time, the amatsukami of Takagamahara, headed by Amaterasu or/and Takamimusubi, decided that Ashihara-no-Nakatsukuni, considered to be overpopulated by unruly and evil kami, must be turned over to them to be pacified. Amaterasu decreed that Ame-no-oshihomimi (天忍穂耳命), (Note: This god's full name is Masaka(tsu)-Akatsu-Kachihayahi-Ame-no-oshihomimi-no-mikoto (正勝吾勝勝速日天忍穂耳(之)命, 正哉吾勝勝速日天忍穂耳尊).) one of the five sons born to Amaterasu when Susanoo chewed her magatama beads, shall take possession of the earth and ordered him to go down to it. Ame-no-oshihomimi, inspecting the land below from the bridge connecting heaven and earth, deemed it to be too tumultuous and refused to go any further, instead going back to report what he saw.

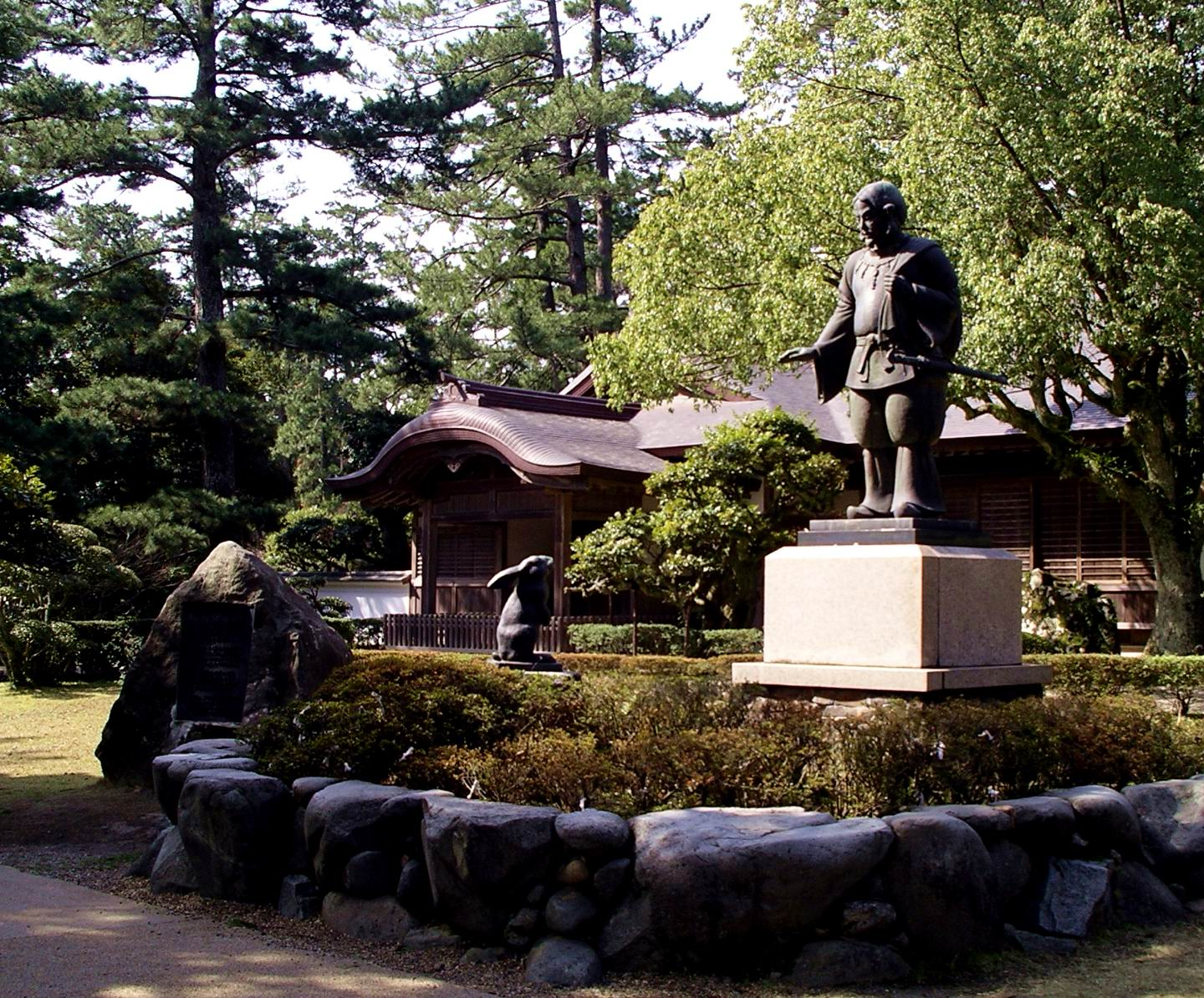
Ōkuninushi meeting the Hare of Inaba, who helped him win the hand of Yagami-hime in exchange for his kindness towards it.

=== Ame-no-hohi ===
The heavenly gods then decided to send another of Amaterasu's sons, Ame-no-hohi (天菩比神, 天穂日命), the most heroic among the gods, down to Ashihara-no-Nakatsukuni. Ame-no-hohi, however, began to curry favor with Ōkuninushi and did not send back any report for three years.

The Nihon Shoki adds that Ame-no-hohi's son, Ōsobi-no-mikuma-no-ushi (大背飯三熊之大人) was sent afterwards, but like his father, he did not report back to Takamagahara.

=== Ame-no-wakahiko ===
After Ame-no-hohi's failure to return, the amatsukami sent another messenger, Ame-no-wakahiko (天若日子, 天稚彦). However, he too came to side with Ōkuninushi, even marrying his daughter Shitateru-hime (下照比売命, 下照姫). After eight years of waiting, the heavenly deities sent a female pheasant to question Ame-no-wakahiko, but he shot it with his bow and arrow at the prodding of a goddess named Ame-no-sagume (天佐具売, 天探女). The blood-stained arrow flew straight up to Takamagahara at the feet of Amaterasu and Takamimusubi, who threw it back to earth with a curse, killing Ame-no-wakahiko.

Ame-no-wakahiko's relatives, hearing the wailing of his bereaved wife, erect a mortuary house (喪屋 moya) for Ame-no-wakahiko's corpse at the place where he died (Kojiki) or at Takamagahara (Nihon Shoki). They then celebrated his memory with song and dance for eight days and nights. A friend of Ame-no-wakahiko during his time on the earth who closely resembled him in appearance, Ajishiki-/Ajisuki-takahikone (阿遅志貴高日子根神, 味耜高彦根神), went to attend Ame-no-wakahiko's funeral. Taking offense at being confused with the dead god by the family of the deceased, Ajisuki-takahikone destroyed the funeral house they built for Ame-no-wakahiko.

=== Takemikazuchi ===
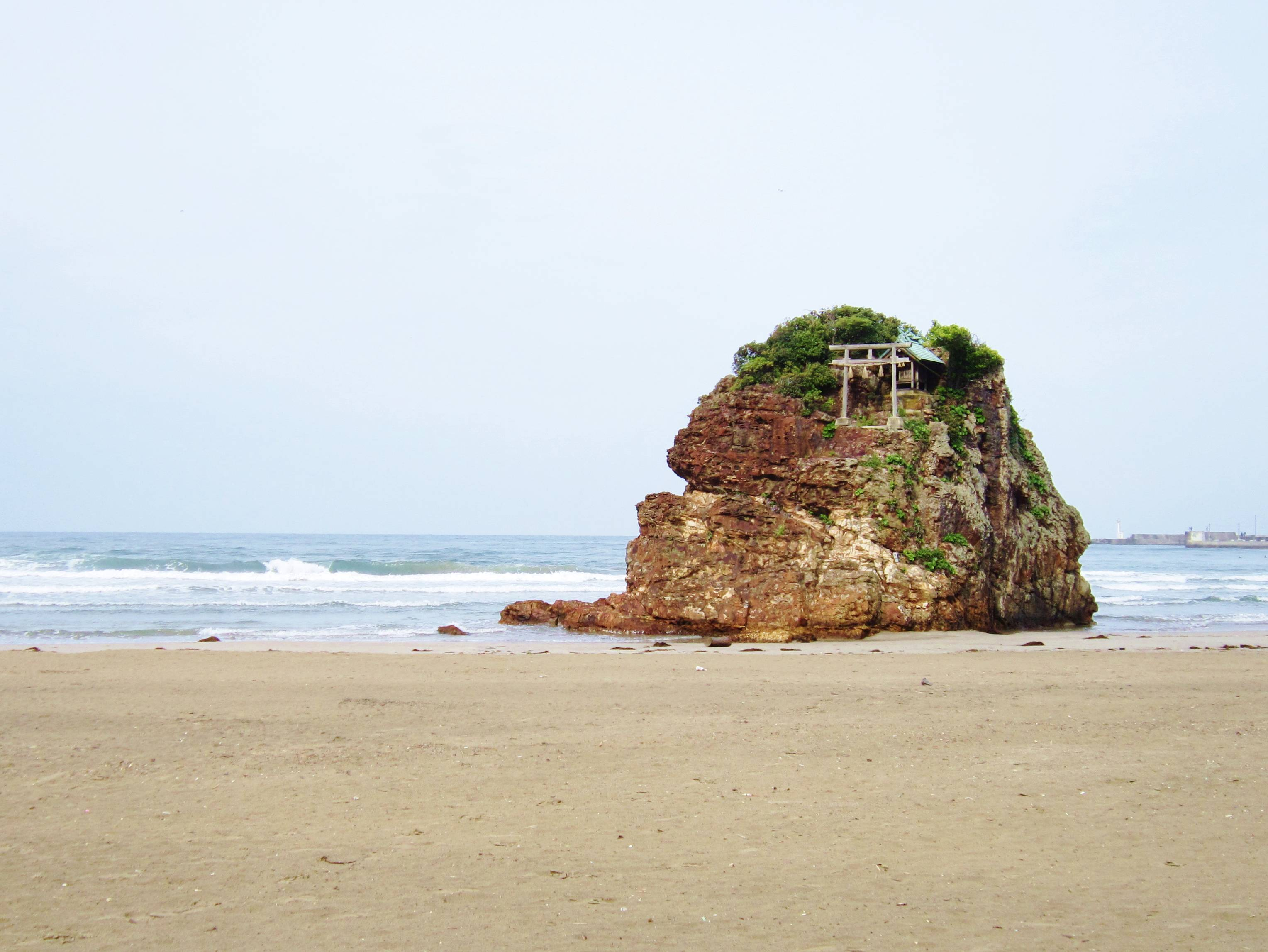
Inasa Beach (稲佐の浜 Inasa-no-hama) in Izumo, Shimane Prefecture, where the myth places Ōkuninushi's meeting with the messengers of heaven and his surrender to them.

After Ame-no-wakahiko's death, the gods of heaven convened another assembly to decide about whom to send next. In the Kojiki, the selected candidates were the god Itsu-no-ohabari (the sword Izanagi used to slay the fire god Kagutsuchi, the birth of whom caused Izanami's death) and his son, Takemikazuchi. As Itsu-no-ohabari was busy damming the headwaters of the heavenly river, Takemikazuchi, accompanied by the bird-boat deity Ame-no-torifune, was sent instead. In the Nihon Shoki, meanwhile, the gods choose the sword god Futsunushi as their messenger; Takemikazuchi is chosen as his companion after he indignantly demanded to be sent as well.

The two messengers arrive at the shores of Inasa (伊那佐之小浜 Inasa no ohama; Kojiki) or Itasa (五十田狹之小汀 Itasa no ohama; Nihon Shoki) in the land of Izumo (modern Taisha-machi, Izumo, Shimane Prefecture). Sitting on the points of their upturned swords, they questioned Ōkuninushi what his intentions were with regard to the land, which was the possession of Amaterasu's descendants. Ōkuninushi asked to confer with his son Kotoshironushi first before giving his decision. Kotoshironushi, who had gone hunting and fishing, immediately acceded to the messengers' demands. After counseling his father to do likewise, he then disappeared.

The Kojiki adds that a younger son of Ōkuninushi, Takeminakata, carrying a giant boulder on the fingertips of a single hand, challenged Takemikazuchi to a test of strength. When Takeminakata tried to seize Takemikazuchi's arm, the latter transformed it into an icicle and then a sword blade, preventing Takeminakata from grabbing it. When Takemikazuchi grasped Takeminakata's arm in return, he crushed it like a reed and threw it aside. Pursued by Takemikazuchi, the injured Takeminakata fled to "the sea of Suwa in the province of Shinano" (科野国州羽海), where he pleaded for his life and surrendered, vowing not to leave Shinano.

With Kotoshironushi's counsel (and Takeminakata's surrender), Ōkuninushi finally agreed to cede the land to the descendants of Amaterasu. As a condition, he asked that a magnificent palace – rooted in the earth and reaching up to heaven – be built for him on Tagishi beach (多芸志之小浜 Tagishi no ohama) in Izumo, where special foods from the sea will be offered (Kojiki). Bequeathing a broad spear he used to pacify the land to the two divine messengers (Nihon Shoki), Ōkuninushi disappeared and became the ruler of the unseen world.

After Ōkuninushi's assent and withdrawal, the two messengers proceeded to destroy everyone and everything who refused to submit to their authority. They then send the god of weaving, Takehazuchi (建葉槌), to subdue the star god Kagaseo (香香背男), the last remaining rebel against Takamagahara (Nihon Shoki). With all resistance finally gone, the two gods went back to heaven to report the success of their mission.

==== Alternate version ====
A third version of the story also found in the Nihon Shoki has Kagaseo – here given the alternative name Amatsu-mikaboshi (天津甕星) – being put to death in Takamagahara by Futsunushi and Takemikazuchi before they descend to Izumo. In this version, Ōkuninushi – as Ōnamochi (大己貴神), the name used for the god in the Nihon Shoki – initially refuses the demand of the two envoys. After Futsunushi goes back to Takamagahara to report, Takamimusubi sends the two messengers back to Ōnamochi, this time with promises of rewards should he comply: in exchange for his political authority, he (Ōnamochi) will be given authority over religious matters, a magnificent palace to dwell in, and festivals in his honor presided by Amaterasu's son Ame-no-hohi. Finding these too good to refuse, Ōnamochi finally accepts their terms. Introducing the god of roads and borders, Kunado-/Funado-no-kami (岐神) to the envoys as his replacement, Ōnamochi disappears into the unseen world.

Appointing Kunado-no-kami as guide, Futsunushi proceeds to go around Ashihara-no-Nakatsukuni, slaying those who resisted him and rewarding those who rendered obedience. The now-invisible Ōnamochi, under the name Ōmononushi (大物主), and Kotoshironushi go up to Takamagahara to swear fealty to the gods of heaven. Takamimusubi rewards Ōnamochi/Ōmononushi by giving him his daughter Mihotsu-hime (三穂津姫) as his wife, and sends him back to earth with "the eighty myriads of deities."

=== Aftermath ===
The earth now under their possession, the amatsukami sent the "Heavenly Grandson" (天孫 tenson), Ame-no-oshihomimi's son Ninigi, to rule over Ashihara-no-Nakatsukuni, bearing with him the three sacred treasures: the sword (Kusanagi no Tsurugi), the mirror (Yata no Kagami), and the jewel (Yasakani no Magatama). Ninigi, taking the goddess Konohana-sakuya-hime as his wife, eventually became the ancestor of the emperors of Japan.

== Similar myths ==
In addition to the Izumo myth cycle recorded in the official histories, other sources provide stories with a similar theme: the transfer of power from one god to another.

=== Ise: Isetsuhiko ===
The Fudoki of Ise Province, which survives only in excerpts quoted in other writings, relates the story of an obscure god of the wind, Isetsuhiko, who was said to have surrendered his land (what would become Ise) to Amenohiwake-no-mikoto (天日別命), who claimed it in the name of Ninigi's great-grandson Jimmu, who launched a military campaign to conquer the eastern lands of Japan. Isetsuhiko is himself apparently identified as the son of a god hailing from Izumo, hence his other name Izumonotakeko-no-mikoto (出雲建子命).

=== Suwa: Moreya ===
Local myths in the Suwa region of Shinano (modern Nagano Prefecture) speak of a foreign deity who was challenged upon his arrival in Suwa by a local god named Moreya. After subduing Moreya and other kami who resisted him, the outsider finally established himself as the region's chief god, being enshrined at the Suwa Grand Shrine by the shores of Lake Suwa. This god, usually known as Suwa-myōjin (諏訪明神), is most commonly identified with the Kojiki's Takeminakata.

== Analysis ==
It is believed that the two earliest official chronicles, the Kojiki and the Nihon Shoki, which purport to contain the 'correct' early history of Japan, were compiled as propaganda designed to legitimize the rule and increase the prestige of the imperial dynasty, which claimed descent from Amaterasu via Ninigi. As such, the Izumo kuni-yuzuri cycle has often been interpreted as a mythic retelling and justification of the rise to power of the Yamato state and its subjugation of other clans and tribes, such as those of Izumo (represented by its deities).

=== Futsunushi and Takemikazuchi ===
Both the Kojiki and the Nihon Shoki agree in naming one of the two messengers the gods of Takamagahara send to Ōkuninushi to be Takemikazuchi, the god of Kashima Shrine in Hitachi Province (modern Ibaraki Prefecture) who was worshipped by the influential Nakatomi clan, which oversaw the religious rituals of the imperial court, and its offshoot, the Fujiwara clan. The second messenger meanwhile is identified in the Nihon Shoki as Futsunushi-no-kami (経津主神), the deity of Katori Shrine in Shimōsa Province (modern Chiba Prefecture) worshipped by the Mononobe clan.

While in the Kojiki it is Takemikazuchi among the two messengers who takes center stage, the two versions of the myth found in Nihon Shoki and other sources imply that the central role was originally occupied by Futsunushi. For instance, both the Fudoki of Izumo Province and the Izumo-no-kuni-no-miyatsuko-no-kanyogoto (出雲国造神賀詞 "Divine Congratulatory Words of the Kuni-no-Miyatsuko of Izumo"), an address the chieftain or governor (kuni-no-miyatsuko/kokuzō) of Izumo offered to the Emperor on behalf of Izumo's deities as a sign of his allegiance to the imperial court, mention or imply only Futsunushi (recorded in both texts as 布都怒志命/布都努志命 Futsunushi-no-mikoto) as descending from heaven, with no mention of Takemikazuchi. It is therefore thought that Takemikazuchi gradually came to take on Futsunushi's attributes and roles, coinciding with the decline of the Mononobe and the rise of the Nakatomi.

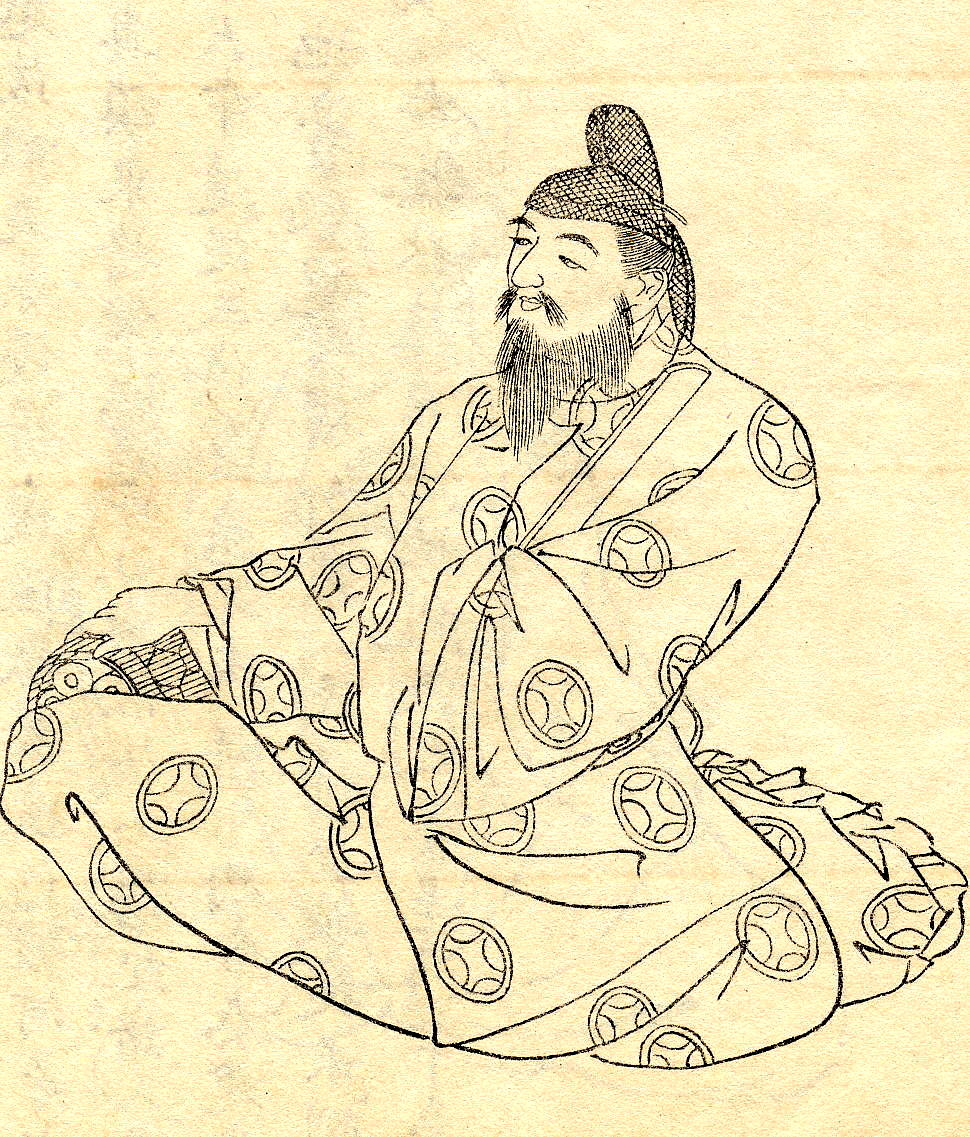
Ō no Yasumaro, compiler and editor of the Kojiki.

=== Takeminakata ===
Takeminakata's abrupt appearance in the Kojiki's version of the myth has long puzzled scholars, as the god is mentioned nowhere else in the work, including the genealogy of Ōkuninushi's progeny that precedes the kuni-yuzuri narrative proper. Aside from the Sendai Kuji Hongi (a.k.a. the Kujiki), which nearly-verbatim replicates the Kojiki's kuni-yuzuri narrative and adds the information that Takeminakata is a son of Nunakawa-hime, he is altogether absent from the Nihon Shoki as well as from early sources dealing with Izumo such as the province's Fudoki.

While earlier authors tended to explain this absence by equating Takeminakata with certain minor deities who are thought to share certain parallels with him (e.g. Isetsuhiko), claiming that these were actually Takeminakata under a different name, more recent scholars suggest instead that the god was an original invention by the Kojiki's compilers, who, for one reason or another, then grafted him to the Izumo myth cycle.

Due to Takeminakata being associated with the Suwa region in historical Shinano Province (modern Nagano Prefecture), scholars look for his origin in this area. It is believed that the Kojiki's chief compiler, Ō no Yasumaro, might have created 'Takeminakata' based on either local legends or recent history (cf. Moreya's resistance against Suwa-myōjin, thought to be a mythicization of local resistance against the encroachment of the Yamato state on the Suwa area) and/or the indigenous pre-Yamato belief system revolving around the nature god(s) Mishaguji and the subsequent adaptation and reorganization of that system under Yamato rule. Scholars point out Yasumaro's clan, the Ō, being distantly related to the clan of the kuni-no-miyatsuko of Shinano, the authorities set up by the imperial court to govern the area, as one possible motivation for inventing a new god based on the legends, the religious practices and the history of Suwa.

== See also ==
- Amaterasu
- Izumo-taisha
- Ōkuninushi
- Susanoo
- Takeminakata
