= Kotoamatsukami =

Collective name for the first Shinto gods after the creation of the universe

In Shinto, Kotoamatsukami (別天津神; literally "distinguishing heavenly kami") is the collective name for the first gods which came into existence at the time of the creation of the universe. They were born in Takamagahara, the world of Heaven at the time of the creation. Unlike the later gods, these deities were born without any procreation.

The three deities that first appeared were:

- Ame no Minakanushi (天之御中主神) - Lord of the August Center of Heaven
- Takamimusubi (高御産巣日神) - Exalted Generative Force
- Kamimusubi (神産巣日神) - Sacred Generative Force

A bit later, two more deities came into existence:

- Umashiashikabihikoji (宇摩志阿斯訶備比古遅神) - Elderly Prince Reed-Shoot
- Ame no Tokotachi (天之常立神) - Ever-Standing Heaven

The Nihon Shoki offers a markedly different account: it does not employ the concept of hitorigami at all, and names as the first three deities to come into being Kunitokotachi, Kuninosatsuchi, and Toyokumonu, deities said to have arisen through the male principle alone, rather than singly and without gender as in the Kojiki. The classification of Ame-no-Minakanushi, Takamimusubi, and Kamimusubi as the zōka sanshin ("three creator deities") became especially prominent only toward the end of the Edo period, as kokugaku scholars increasingly emphasized the Kojiki over the Nihon Shoki. The next generation of gods that followed was the Kamiyonanayo, which included Izanagi-no-Mikoto and Izanami-no-Mikoto, the patriarch and matriarch of all other Japanese gods, respectively. Afterward, the Kotoamatsukami "hides away" as hitorigami.

Though the Zōkasanshin (three deities of creation) are thought to be genderless, another theory stated Kamimusuhi was the woman and Takamimusubi the man, comparing them with water and fire or with yin and yang.

The theologian Hirata Atsutane identified Ame no Minakanushi as the spirit of the North Star, master of the seven stars of the Big Dipper.

Strangely, Takamimusubi later reappeared together with Amaterasu as one of the central gods in Takamagahara, and his daughter was the mother of the god Ninigi-no-Mikoto. He also played important roles in the events of the founding of Japan, such as selecting the gods who would tag along with Ninigi and sending the Yatagarasu, the three legged solar crow, to help Emperor Jimmu, who in turn, greatly worshipped him by playing the role of medium priest taking Takamimusubi's identity, in the ceremonies before his Imperial Enthronement. Later, Takamimusubi was worshipped by the Jingi-kan and considered the god of matchmaking. Some Japanese clans also claimed descent from this god, such as the Saeki clan, he is also an Imperial ancestor.

As for Kamimusubi, she has strong ties with both the Amatsukami (heavenly gods) and the Kunitsukami (earthly gods) of Izumo mythology. Kamimusubi is also said to have transformed the grains produced by the food goddess Ōgetsuhime (Ukemochi no kami) after she was slain by Susanoo.

== See also ==
- Cosmic Man
- Japanese creation myth
  - Creation myth
- Japanese mythology
