= Japanese mythology =

Body of myths originating in Japan

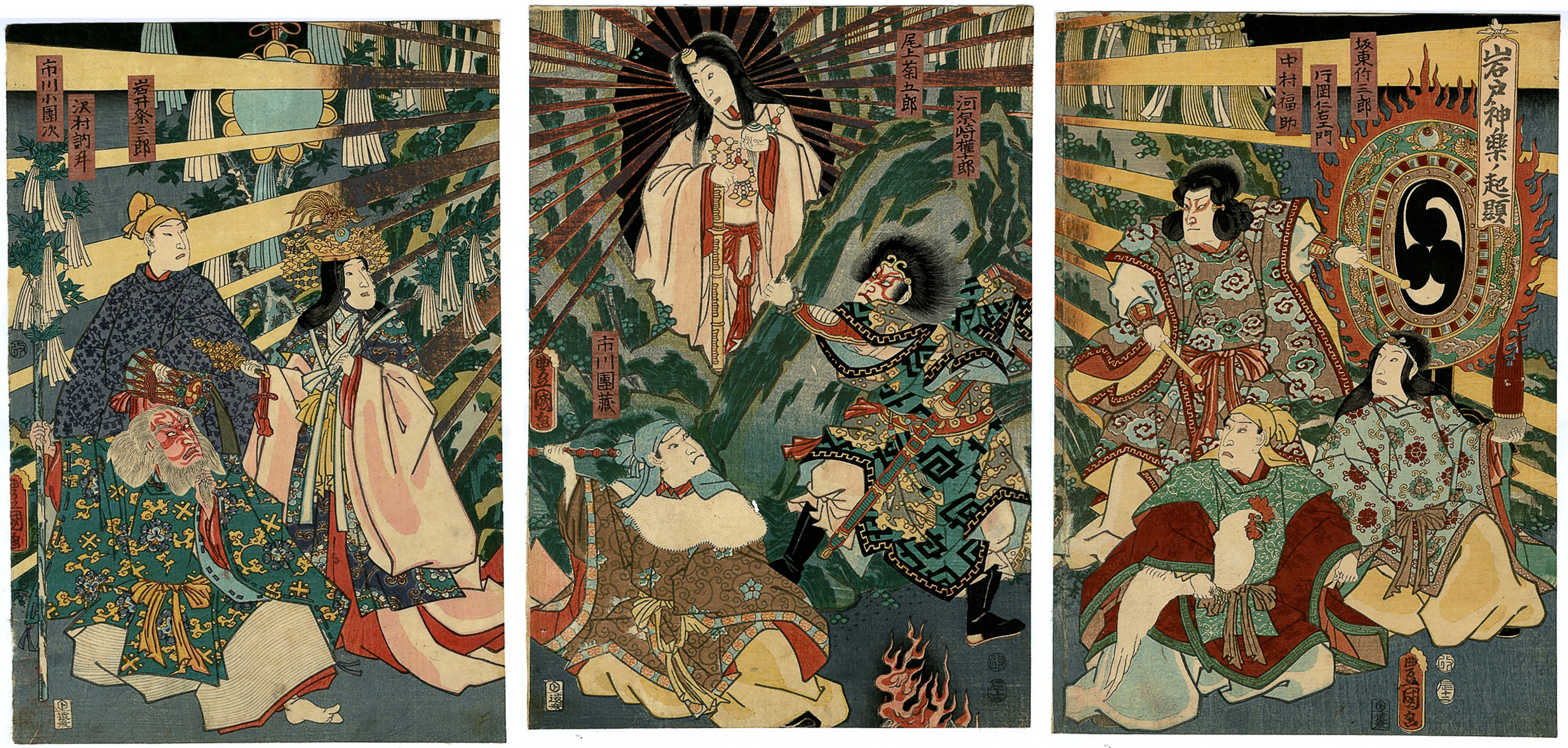
Amaterasu emerges from the cave.

Japanese mythology is a collection of traditional stories, folktales, and beliefs that emerged in the islands of the Japanese archipelago. Shinto traditions are the cornerstones of Japanese mythology. The history of thousands of years of contact with Chinese and various Indian myths (such as Buddhist and Hindu mythology) are also key influences in Japanese religious belief.

Japanese myths are tied to the topography of the archipelago as well as agriculturally-based folk religion, and the Shinto pantheon holds uncountable kami ("god(s)" or "spirits").

Two important sources for Japanese myths, as they are recognized today, are the Kojiki and the Nihon Shoki. The Kojiki, or "Record of Ancient Matters," is the oldest surviving account of Japan's myths, legends, and history. Additionally, the Shintōshū describes the origins of Japanese deities from a Buddhist perspective.

One notable feature of Japanese mythology is its explanation of the origin of the Imperial Family, which has been used historically to deify to the imperial line.

Japanese is not transliterated consistently across all sources (see spelling of proper nouns).

== Sources ==
Japanese myths are passed down through oral tradition, through literary sources (including traditional art), and through archaeological sources. For much of Japan's history, communities were mostly isolated, which allowed for local legends and myths to grow around unique features of the geographic location where the people who told the stories lived.

=== Literary sources ===
The Kojiki and the Nihon Shoki, completed in A.D. 712 and A.D. 720 respectively, had the two most referenced and oldest sources of Japanese mythology and pre-history. Written in the Eighth century, under the Yamato state, the two collections relate the cosmogony and mythic origins of the Japanese archipelago, its people, and the imperial family. It is based on the records of the Kojiki and Nihon Shoki that the imperial family claims direct descent from the sun goddess Amaterasu and her grandson Ninigi.

Emperor Temmu enlisted the help of Hiyeda no Are who committed to memory the history of Japan as it was recorded in two collections that are thought by historians to have existed before the Kojiki and Nihongi. Under Empress Gemmei's rule, Hideya no Are's memory of the history of the Japanese archipelago and its mythological origins were recorded in spite of Emperor Temmu's death before its completion. As a result of Hideya no Are's account, the Kojiki was finally completed, transcribed in kanji characters, during Empress Genshō's time as sovereign. The Yamato state also produced fudoki and Man'yōshū, two more of the oldest surviving texts that relate the historical and mythical origins of Japan's people, culture, and the imperial family.

Motoori Norinaga, an Edo-period Japanese scholar, interpreted Kojiki and his commentary, annotations, and use of alternate sources to supplement his interpretations are studied by scholars today because of their influence on the current understanding of Japanese myths.

=== Archaeological sources ===
Archaeologists studying the history of the Japanese Archipelago separate the prehistoric history into three eras based on attributes of the discoveries associated with each era. The Jōmon period marks the first cases of pottery found on the archipelago, followed by the Yayoi period and the Kofun period. The Yayoi district of the Japanese capital Tokyo, is the namesake of the Yayoi period because archaeologists discovered pottery associated with the time period there.

Contact with Korean civilization in the latter part of the Yayoi period influenced the culture of the Japanese Archipelago greatly, as evidenced by the discovery of artifacts that archaeologists associate with various cultural streams from Korea, and northeast Asia. Finally, Kofun period artifacts, ranging from A.D. 250 to A.D. 600, are the archaeological sources of what historians know about the Yamato kingdom — the same Yamato state that was responsible for the two most prominent literary sources of Japanese myth, the Kojiki and Nihon Shoki.

== Cosmogony ==
=== Origins of Japan and the kami ===
==== Kuniumi and Kamiumi ====
Japan's archipelago creation narrative can be divided into the birth of the deities (Kamiumi) and the birth of the land (Kuniumi). The birth of the deities begins with the appearance of the first generation of gods who appeared out of primordial oil, a trio of gods who produced the next seven generations of gods. Izanagi and Izanami were eventually born, siblings, and using a naginata decorated with jewels, named Ame-no-nuhoko ("Heavenly Jeweled Spear") that was gifted to them. Izanagi created the first islands of the Japanese Archipelago by dipping the Naginata into the primordial waters. Historians have interpreted the myth of Izanagi's creation of the first Japanese Island Onogoro as an early example of phallocentrism in Japanese mythology.

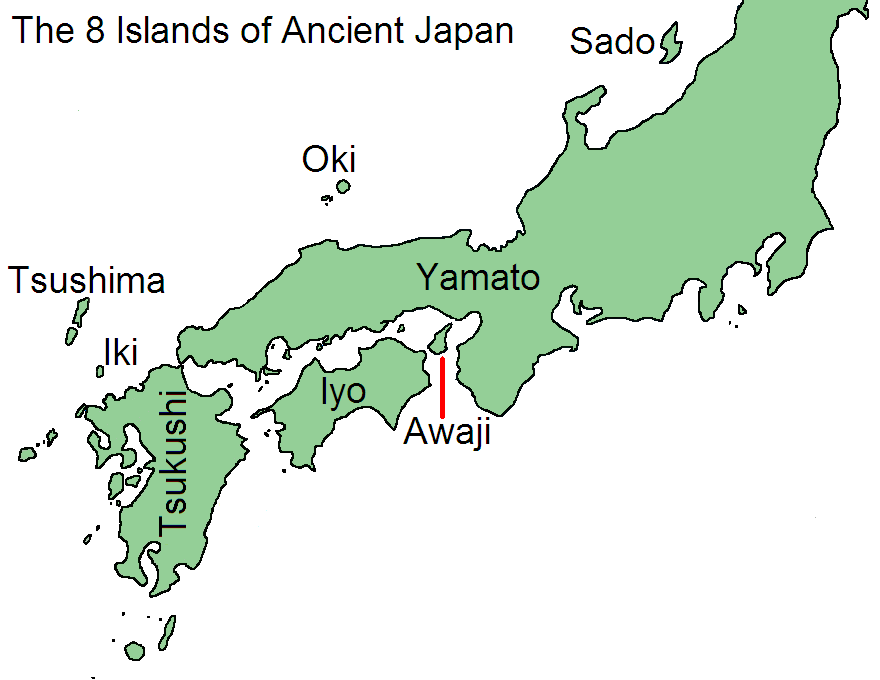
The Ōyashima, or the eight great islands of Japan, are the children of Izanami and Izanagi according to the Shokiji.

The earliest creation myths of Japanese mythology generally involve topics such as death, decay, loss, infanticide, and contamination. The creation myths place great importance on purification, ceremonial order, and the masculine. For example, the first child born to Izanagi and Izanami after they attempt a union ceremony is born with no limbs or bones, and the parents discard the child by sending him to sea in a boat. When Izanagi and Izanami ask the older gods why their child was born without bones or limbs, they are told it was because they did not conduct the ceremony properly and that the male must always speak before the female. Once they follow the directions of the older gods correctly, they produce many children, many of whom are the islands of the Japanese Archipelago. Among their children are the Ōyashima, or the eight great islands of Japan — Awaji, Iyo, Oki, Tsukushi, Iki, Tsushima, Sado, and Yamato. The last child that Izanami produces is a fire god, Kagutsuchi (incarnation of fire), whose flames kill her; and Izanagi murders the child in grief-driven anger. The child's corpse creates even more gods. Izanami was then buried on Mount Hiba, at the border of the old provinces of Izumo and Hoki, near modern-day Yasugi of Shimane Prefecture.

Scholars of Japanese mythology have noted the incestuous themes of the creation myth as represented in the Kojiki, and the first scholar to write about Izanagi and Izanami as siblings was Oka Masao. Izanami is referred to in the Kojiki as Izanagi's imo (meaning both wife or little sister in Japanese) and other scholars dispute that the pair were siblings. Hattori Asake, another scholar, argued that Oka was correct because he drew evidence from another myth about humans who had incestuous relations because of a great flood wiping out the rest of the human population. Essentially, Hattori said the myth Oka used as evidence was too different to be the origin of the Izanagi and Izanami myth. In the Man'yōshū, Izanami is also referred to as imo by the compiler, suggesting that the compiler believed that Izanami was Izanagi's sister. While scholars disagree about the nature of Izanami and Izanagi's relationships, the gods Amaterasu and Susanoo, children of Izanagi, were sibling gods who created children together in a contest preceding Susanoo's desecration of Amaterasu's home which leads to her hiding in a cave. A unique aspect of Japanese mythology is its inclusion of graphic details, with disgusting and horrific images that are considered to be taboo in modern Japanese society, which has many cultural practices associated with purification and cleanliness.

==== Yomi ====
After Izanami's death, the myth of Izanagi's efforts to rescue her from Yomi, an underworld described in Japanese mythology, explains the origins of the cycle of birth and death. After killing their child Kagutsuchi, Izanagi was still grief-stricken, so he undertook the task of finding a way to bring Izanami back from the dead. After finally locating her, he disobeyed her order to not look at her while she went to ask permission to leave Yomi. He used his hair to create a flame, and when he gazed at Izanami's rotting, maggot-filled flesh he fled in fear and disgust. Izanami felt betrayed and tried to capture him, but he escaped by creating obstacles for Izanami's horde of shikome including using peaches to threaten them. The myth of Izanagi's journey into Yomi features many themes of food, he creates grapes to distract the shikome who stop to eat them, granting him time to escape. Izanagi declared these peaches divine, naming them Ōkamuzumi, and peaches appear in many other Japanese myths, especially the tale of Momotarō the peach boy.

==== The Sun, Moon, and Storm ====
The origins of the Sun and the Moon are accounted for in Japanese mythology through the myth of Izanagi's return from Yomi. After spending so much time in Yomi, Izanagi cleansed himself with a purification ceremony. As Izanagi cleansed himself, the water and robes that fell from his body created many more gods. Purification rituals still function as important traditions in Japan today, from shoe etiquette in households to sumo wrestling purification ceremonies. Amaterasu, the Sun goddess and divine ancestor of the first Emperor Jimmu, was born from Izanagi's eye. The Moon god, Tsukuyomi, and Susanoo the storm god were born at the same time as Amaterasu, when Izanagi washed his face.

Myths related the Sun, the Moon, and the Storm kami are full of strife and conflict. The Sun goddess and her sibling the moon god's interpersonal conflicts explain, in Japanese myth, why the Sun and the Moon do not stay in the sky at the same time — their distaste for one another keeps them both turning away from the other. Meanwhile, the sun goddess and the storm god Susanoo's conflicts were intense and bloody. Various accounts of Susanoo's temper tantrum in Amaterasu's home depict a variety of disgusting and brutal behaviors (everything from smearing his feces across her home's walls to skinning her favorite horse alive and throwing it at her maid and killing the maid) but it is usually, in depictions of this particular myth, Susanoo's behavior that scares Amaterasu into hiding in a cave. It would take the combined efforts of many other kami, and the erotic dance of a particular goddess named Ame no Uzume, to lure Amaterasu from the cave again. Ame no Uzume exposed herself while dancing and created such commotion that Amaterasu peeked out from her cave. The myth of Amaterasu's entering and emerging from a cave is depicted in one of the most iconic images of Japanese mythology which is shown to the right.

The sun goddess Amaterasu's importance in Japanese mythology is two-fold. She is the sun, and one of Izanagi's most beloved of children, as well as the ancestor of the Japanese imperial line, according to legend. Her status as a sun goddess had political ramifications for the imperial family, and the Yamato state most likely benefited from the myth when dealing with Korean influences because Korea also had myths of sun god ancestors for the Korean imperial family.

==== First Emperor Jimmu ====
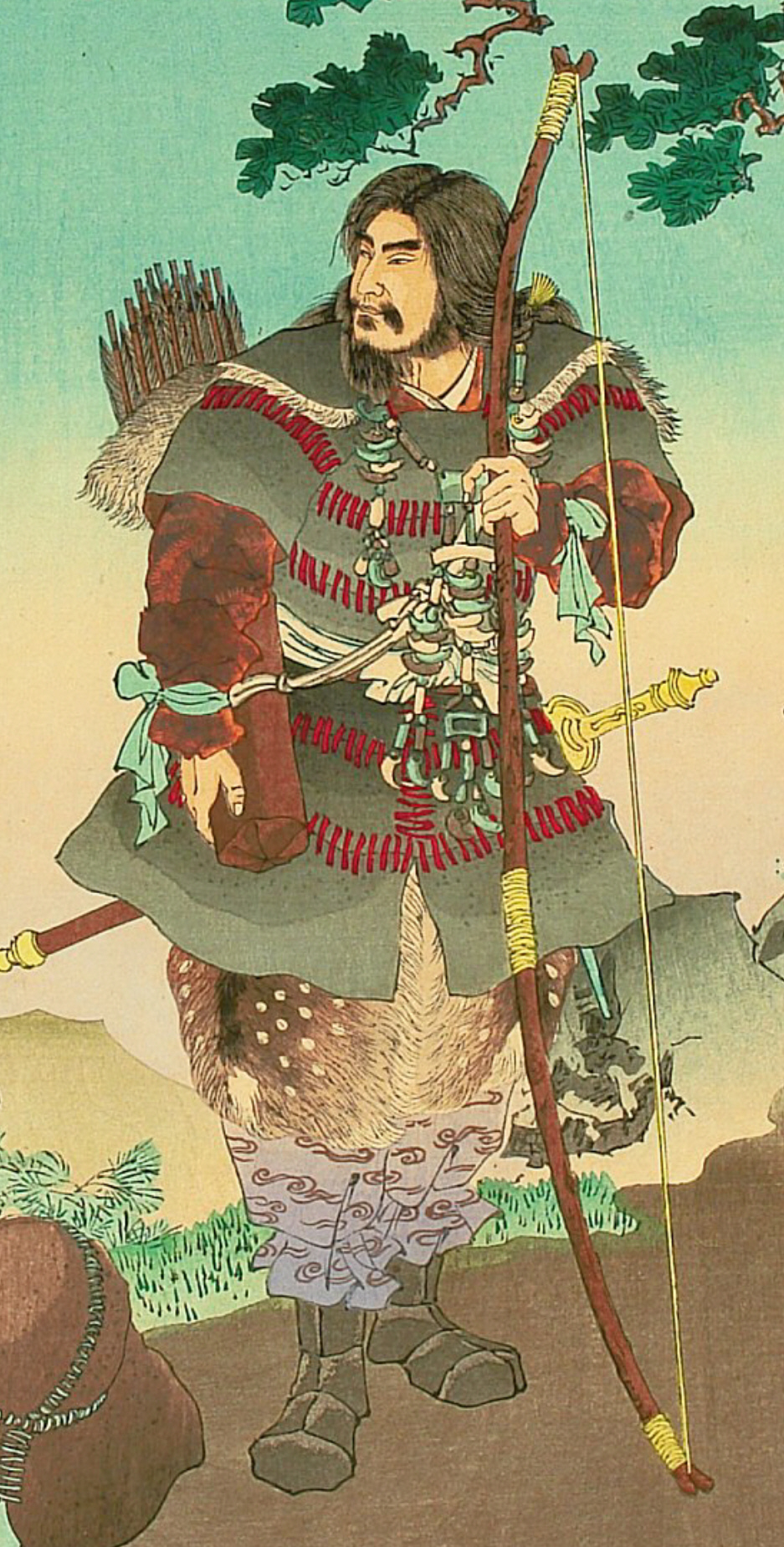
Jimmu Tennō

The tale of first Emperor Jimmu is considered the origin of the Imperial family. Emperor Jimmu is, according to records, the human descendant of Amaterasu the Sun goddess. His ascension to the throne marked the "Transition from Age of the Gods to Human Age". After taking control of Yamato province, he established the imperial throne and acceded in the year of kanototori (conventionally dated to 660 B.C.). At the end of the seventh century, the Imperial court finally moved from where Emperor Jimmu was said to have founded it in Yamato.

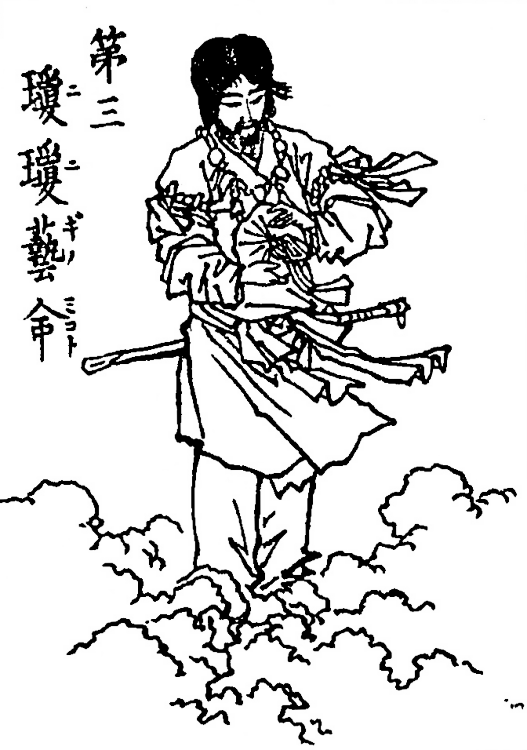
Ninigi otokawa, great-grandfather of Jimmu Tennō

The importance of this myth in particular is that it establishes the origins, and the power, of the Japanese imperial family as divine. Although some scholars believe that the myths found in the Nihon Shoki and Kojiki are meant to give authority to the imperial family, others suggest that the myths in the Nihon Shoki and Kojiki are unique accounts meant to give authority to the mythic histories in themselves. The Nihon Shoki and Kojiki have varying accounts of the mythic history of Japan, and there are differences in the details of the origins of the imperial family between the two texts. The imperial dynasty still has a role as a public symbol of the state and people, according to the current constitution of Japan.

=== The Japanese pantheon ===
Japanese gods and goddesses, called kami, are uniquely numerous (there are at least eight million) and varied in power and stature. They are usually descendants from the original trio of gods that were born from nothing in the primordial oil that was the world before the kami began to shape it. There are easily as many kami in Japanese myth as there are distinct natural features, and most kami are associated with natural phenomena. Scholars generally classify kami into two broad categories: nature kami, further divided into amatsukami ("heavenly kami") and kunitsukami ("earthly kami"), collectively known as tenjinchigi, and culture kami, further divided into community kami, functional kami, and human kami. Nature kami represent the recognition of supernatural qualities in natural objects or phenomena: heavenly kami include celestial bodies and other natural phenomena raised to divine status, while earthly kami include the deification of geological formations, physical processes, plants, and animals. Kami can take many shapes and forms, some look almost human in depictions found by archaeologists; meanwhile, other kami look like hybrids of humans and creatures, or may not look human at all. One example of a kami who looks almost human in depictions is the ruler of the Seas Ryujin. On the other hand, kami like Ninigi and Amaterasu are often depicted as human in their forms.

Shinto originated in Japan, and the Kojiki and Nihon Shoki tell the tales of the Shinto pantheon's origins. Shinto is still practiced today in Japan. In Shinto belief, kami has multiple meanings and could also be translated as "spirit" and all objects in nature have a kami according to this system. Myths often tell stories of particular, local deities and kami; for example, the kami of a mountain or a nearby lake. Most kami take their origins from Shinto beliefs, but the influence of Buddhism also affected the pantheon. Contact with other cultures usually had some influence on Japanese myth. In the fourteenth century, Christianity found its way to Japan through St. Francis Xavier and there was also contact with westerners. However, during the Tokugawa shogunate Christians were executed in Japan. Twenty Christians were crucified before that while Toyotomi Hideyoshi was consolidating his power after the assassination of Oda Nobunaga. Christianity was banned in Japan until well into the nineteenth century.

==== Folklore heroes ====
As in other cultures, Japanese mythology accounts for not only the actions of supernatural beings but also the adventures and lives of folk heroes. There are many Japanese heroes that are associated with specific locations in Japan, and others that are more well known across the archipelago. Some heroes are thought to have been real people, such as the Forty-seven rōnin, but their legacy has been transformed into great folktales that depict the historical figures as more gifted, powerful, or knowledgeable than the average person. The heroic adventures of these heroes range from acts of kindness and devotion, such as the myth of Shita-kiri Suzume, to battling frightful enemies, as in the tale of Momotaro.

Themes that appear in the folklore concerning heroes are moral lessons, or stories that function as parables. The tale of Shita-kiri Suzume, for example, warns of the dangers of greed, avarice, and jealousy through the example of an old couple's experiences with a fairy who disguised herself as a sparrow to test the old man. The influence of Bushido is noticeable in the behavior of heroes, and heroes often were also warriors. Momotaro, born from a peach for a childless couple to raise, is a mythic hero who embodied courage and dutifulness as he went on a journey to defeat oni who were kidnapping, raping, and pillaging his home island. The tale of Momotaro also shares in the themes of violence, sexual violence, and deities or demons devouring humans. Stories of sexual violence are common in the Buddhist text Nihon ryōiki, while stories of people being devoured by mountain deities are found as if they are historical accounts in the fudoki. In Japanese folklore, heroes like Momotaro rescue women from violent kami and oni. Although the exploits of heroes are well known, Japanese mythology also featured heroines. Ototachibana, the wife of Yamato Takeru, threw herself into the sea to save her husband's ship and quell the wrath of the storm that threatened them. Yamato Takeru, once safe, built a tomb for her and his mourning utterance for his wife caused Eastern Honshu to be called Adzuma.

==== Mythological creatures ====
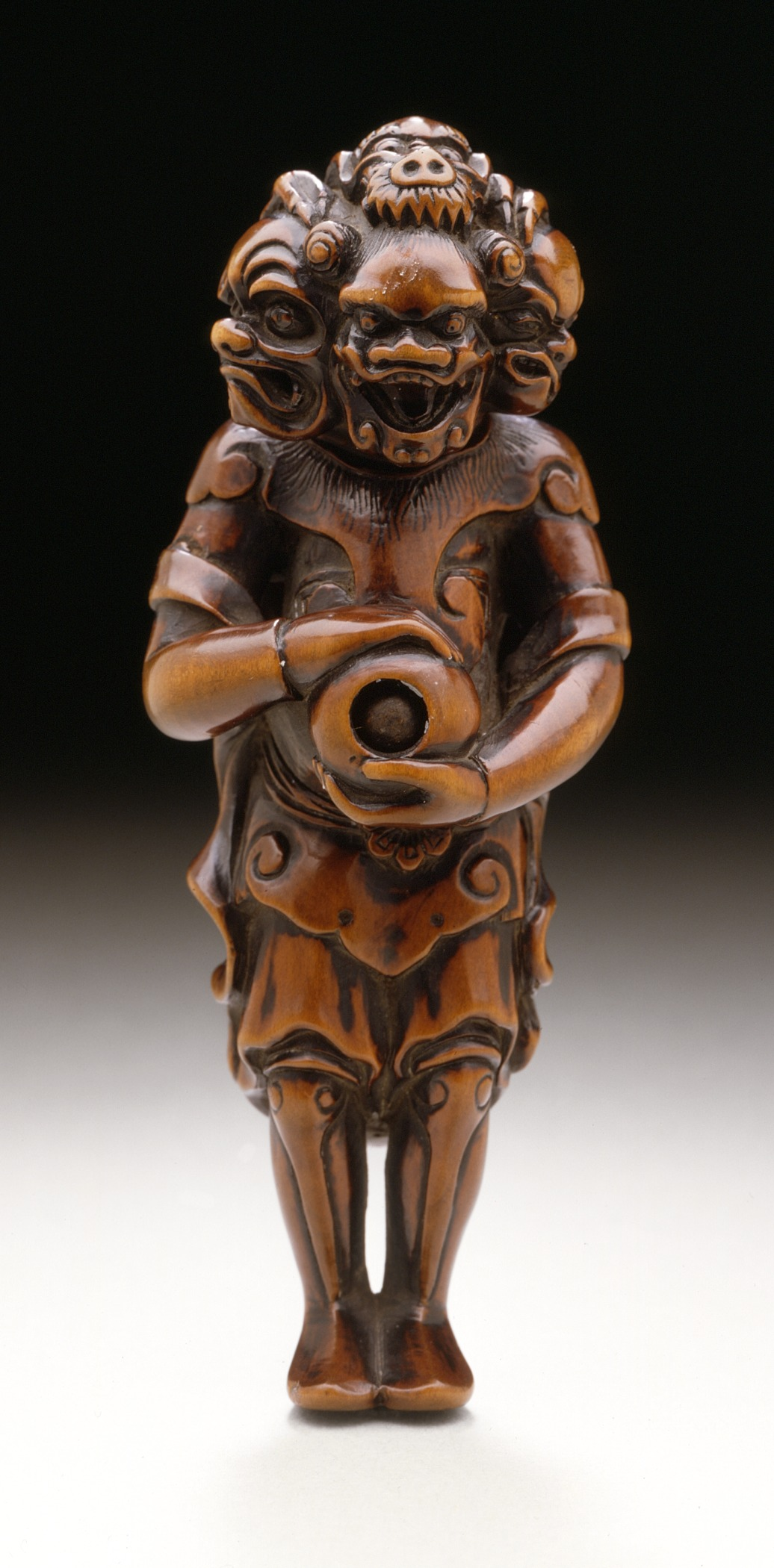
Ryujin: Ruler of Seas and Tides LACMA M.91.250.287

Jorōgumo spider: The Jorōgumo spider is commonly known as a member of the Yōkai myths. The myth begins in a waterfall near the city of Izu. A man had been working long hours, and decided to take a nap. He rested near the waterfall, when Jorōgumo arrived, stalking her first prey. Taking on the persona of a beautiful woman, the man simply thought she was. After she saw he was asleep, she quickly turned to her true form, top half a beautiful woman and the bottom half a spider. The man awoke in a web, and was lucky enough to escape said web and tell the tale to local citizens. Unfortunately, a lumberjack who worked in that forest was not lucky enough to escape the mythological creature.

The Jorōgumo spider is commonly told in Japanese folklore. The word itself translates to the meaning "whore spider". Every story commonly states that the creature captures its prey by first seeming like a beautiful woman, then after seduction, completely turns into the spider. This creature is believed to be over 400 years old. There is said to be a male version of this horrific creature, commonly called the Tsuchigumo.

== See also ==
- Ainu mythology
- Japanese Buddhism
- Japanese folklore
- Japanese urban legends
- Kami
- Kamui
- Kuni-yuzuri
- List of Japanese deities
- Seven Lucky Gods
- Hōsōshin demon
- Shinto
- Yokai
- Yurei
- Kaiju

== Spelling of proper nouns ==
Spelling of proper nouns

Many deities appear in Japanese mythology, and many of them have multiple aliases. Furthermore, some of their names are comparatively long. This article, therefore, lists only the most prominent names and gives them in one of their abbreviated forms, other abbreviated forms are also in use.

(For instance, Ninigi, or Ame-Nigishikuni-Nigishiamatsuhiko-Hikono-no-Ninigi-no-Mikoto in full, may also be abbreviated as Hikoho-no-Ninigi or Hono-Ninigi.)

In some parts of this article, proper names are written in a historical manner. In this article, underlined h, y, and w denote silent letters; they are omitted from modern spelling. Other syllables are modernized as follows (see also Japanese romanization systems). Note that some blend of these conventions is also often used.

- hu is modernized as fu.
- zi and di are modernized as ji (the distinction disappeared).
- oo is modernized as o or oh.

For instance, various spellings of Ohonamuji include Oonamuji, Ohnamuji, and others.
