= Kamiyonanayo =

Japanese mythological deities

In Japanese mythology, the Kamiyonanayo (神世七代; lit. "Seven Generations of the Age of the Gods") are the seven generations of kami that emerged after the formation of heaven and earth(Tenchi-kaibyaku).

According to the Kojiki, these deities appeared after the Kotoamatsukami, which appeared at the time of the creation of the universe. The first two generations were hitorigami while the five that followed came into being as male-female pairs of kami: brothers and sisters that were at the same time married couples (a common trope in many mythologies, see: List of coupled siblings in religion, mythology and legends). In total the Kamiyonanayo consists of 12 deities in this chronicle.

In contrast, the chronicle Nihon Shoki, points out that this group was the first to appear after the creation of heaven and earth. It also states that the first three generations of deities were hitorigami and that the other generations of deities were pairs of the opposite sex. Finally the Nihon Shoki uses a different spelling for the names of all deities.

The last generation, consisting of Izanagi and Izanami, was the couple that would be responsible for the creation of the Japanese archipelago (Kuniumi) and would engender other deities (Kamiumi).

== List of deities ==
Gen.	Name according to Kojiki (Honorific form)	Name according to Nihonshoki (Honorific form)	Gods equivalents
1	Kuni no Tokotachi (国之常立神, Kuni no Tokotachi no kami) (Personification of Earth)	Kuni no Tokotachi (国常立尊, Kuni no Tokotachi no mikoto) / Kuni no Satsuchi (国狭槌尊, Kuni no Satsuchi no mikoto)	Gaia
2	Toyokumono (豊雲野神, Toyokumono no kami) (Personification of Clouds/Heaven)	Toyokumono (豊斟渟尊, Toyokumuno no mikoto; 豊組野尊, Toyokumono no mikoto; 豊香節野尊, Toyokabuno no mikoto; 浮経野豊買尊, Ukabuno no Toyokafu no mikoto; 豊国野尊, Toyokunino no mikoto; 豊齧野尊, Toyokabuno no mikoto; 葉木国野尊, Hakokunino no mikoto; 見野尊, Mino no mikoto)	
3	Uhijini (宇比邇神, Uhijini-no-kami) and Suhijini (須比智邇神, Suhijini-no-kami)	Uhijini (泥土煮尊, Uhijini-no-mikoto) and Suhijini (沙土煮尊, Suhijini-no-mikoto)	
4	Tsunugui (角杙神 Tsunugui no kami) and Ikugui (活杙神, Ikugui no kami)	Tsunugui (角樴尊, Tsunugui no mikoto) and Ikugui (活樴尊, Ikugui no mikoto)	
5	Otonoji (意富斗能地神) and Otonobe (大斗乃弁神)	Ōtonoji (大戸之道尊, Ōtonoji no mikoto; 大戸摩彦尊, Ōtoma-hiko-no-mikoto; 大富道尊, Ōtomuji-no-mikoto) and Ōtonobe (大苫辺尊, Ōtonobe no mikoto)	
6	Omodaru (淤母陀琉神, Omodaru no kami) and Ayakashikone (阿夜訶志古泥神, Ayakashikone no kami)	Omodaru (面足尊, Omodaru no mikoto) and Kashikone (惶根尊, Kashikone no mikoto)	
7	Izanagi (伊邪那岐神, Izanagi no kami) and Izanami (伊邪那美神, Izanami no kami)	Izanagi (伊弉諾尊, Izanagi no mikoto) and Izanami (伊弉冉尊, Izanami no mikoto)	

== Genealogy ==
Kuni no Tokotachi
Toyokumono
Uhijini	Suhijini
Tsunugui	Ikugui
Otonoji	Otonobe
Omodaru	Ayakashikone
Izanagi	Izanami

== See also ==
- List of Japanese deities
- Shinto
