= Sukunabikona =

Kami (deity) in Shintoism

- Parents: Kamimusubi (Kojiki), Takamimusubi (Nihon Shoki)

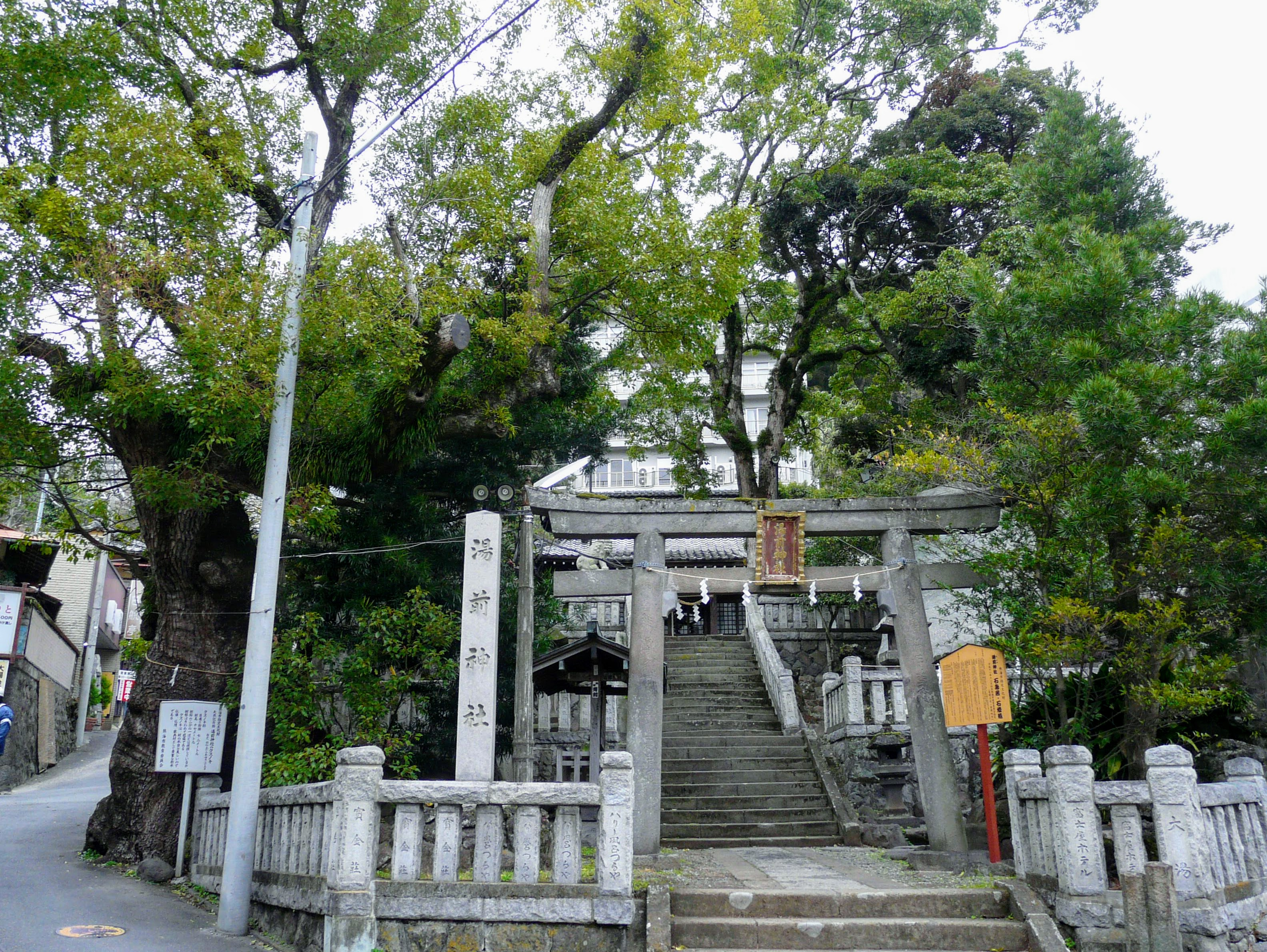
Yuzen shrine at Atami onsen enshrines Sukunabikona

Sukunabikona or Sukuna bikona (少彦名神, also known as Sukuna-biko, Sukuna-biko-na, Sukuna hikona) is the Shinto kami of the onsen (hot springs), agriculture, healing, magic, brewing sake and knowledge. His name means "the small lord of renown." He is often described as being a dwarf and is frequently paired with Ōkuninushi.

== Adventures with Ōkuninushi ==
One day while Ōkuninushi was at Miho Bay, he saw a small boat on the whitecap waves. The boat was made of a Metaplexis pod. Inside was a small dwarf, no bigger than a thumb. Ōkuninushi picked him up, and Sukuna-biko-na bit him on the cheek. Ōkuninushi asked him his name, but he would not reply. Then a nearby toad said to bring Sukuna-biko-na to Kuebiko the kami of agriculture, as the scarecrow god would know. When Kuebiko saw the dwarf, he said "That is Sukuna son of Kami-Musubi." Kamimusubi is part of the primordial creator trinity with Takamimusubi and Ame-no-Minakanushi. Ōkuninushi was shocked that such a small being could be the son of such a powerful creator goddess.

Ōkuninushi brought Sukuna-biko-na to Kami-Musubi, who said that yes, he was her son, and that he fell out of her fingers. Ōkuninushi was on a quest to continue the creation of the Central Reed Plain and unite the people. She decreed that the two would work together to help finish building Izumo, and they joined forces to help build the land.

Tradition holds that Sukuna-biko-na left this world at Awaji Island by climbing a grain of millet, which then dipped under his weight and rebounded, flinging him into Tokoyo no Kuni.

As part of his quest to help Ōkuninushi complete construction of the land, Sukuna-biko-na invented medicines and cures for illnesses and diseases, including magical spells for protection. In addition to his other domains, he is a master of magic and wizardry. His ascension into space, rather than a natural death, makes him a Marebito.

== As Deity of Hot Springs ==
On one of their adventures, Sukuna became ill. They went to the Dōgo hot springs. Ōkuninushi put Sukuna-biko in the hot spring water to revive him. Sukuna hikona then took a nap. When he awoke, he was cured, and Sukuna danced on a stone. His footprints left an impression on the rock, known as Tamanoishi, which remains in Dogo Onsen today north of the main building.

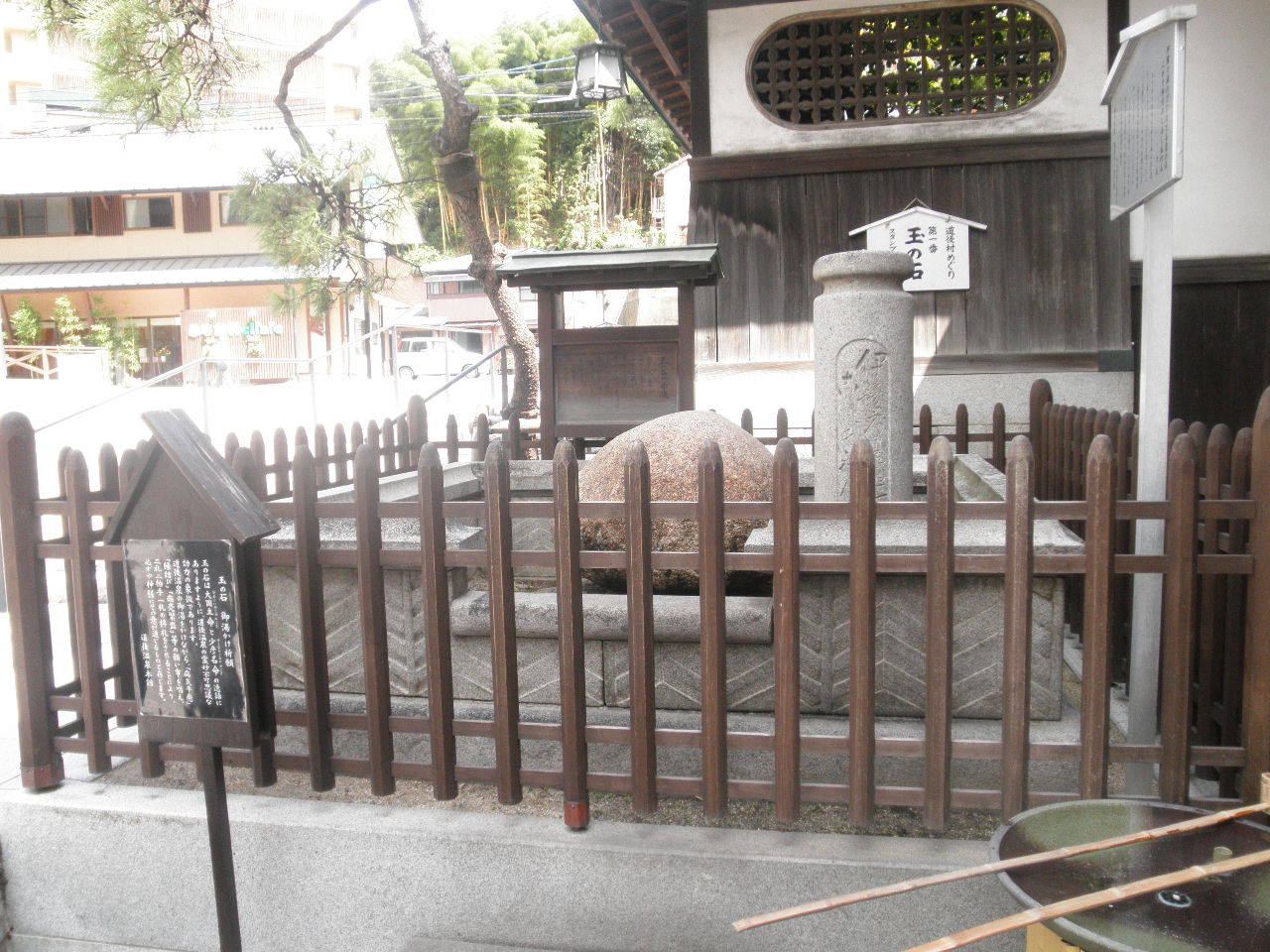
Tamanoishi at Dogo Onsen

The ability for the natural hot spring to cure a god bestowed the waters, and the land itself from which they sprung, a divine importance.

He is known as an immigrant deity, in that he came from across the sea and then departed the land.

== As Inventor of Sake ==
Some sources credit him as well with the invention of Sake. He taught the people how to brew the beverage from rice.

In the Kojiki, Empress Jingū gives a banquet toast crediting the deity Sukuna with the creation of Sake:

This fine liquor
Is not my fine liquor.
The potion-master
Who dwells in the Everworld (tokoyo)
The rock-standing
Deity Sukuna
With godly blessing,
Blessing in frenzy,
With abundant blessing
Blessing around and around
Came and offered
This fine liquor:
Drink unsparingly
Sa! Sa!

Thereupon Takeuchi no Sukune no Mikoto replied on behalf of the prince:

He who brewed
This fine liquor-was it because
He took his drum
And standing it up like a mortar,
Singing while he brewed
Did the brewing of the beer
Dancing while he brewed
Did the brewing of the beer,
That this fine liquor,
Fine liquor,
Makes me feel so extra good?
Sa! Sa!

Due to Sukuna bikona's gift of liquor to the people, he is sometimes paired with the goddess of food Uke Mochi. The reference to the standing stone in the song refers to his worship as a sacred stone. Both Sukuna bikona and Ohona-mochi are enshrined as sacred stones in a temple in Noto Province.

== Shrines ==
In Shinto, it is believed that the god resides within a sacred object housed at the shrine. It is possible for a deity to be in more than one place at a time, as such a Kami may be housed at many shrines, as well as being omnipresent and omniscient.

Sukuna Hikona is enshrined at, Oarai Isosaki-jinja. In the Montoku Jitsuroku, a book of Japanese history, Ōkuninushi and Sukuna Hikona descended in 856, proclaiming that they had returned to help the people of the land and a shrine was built to honor their arrival.

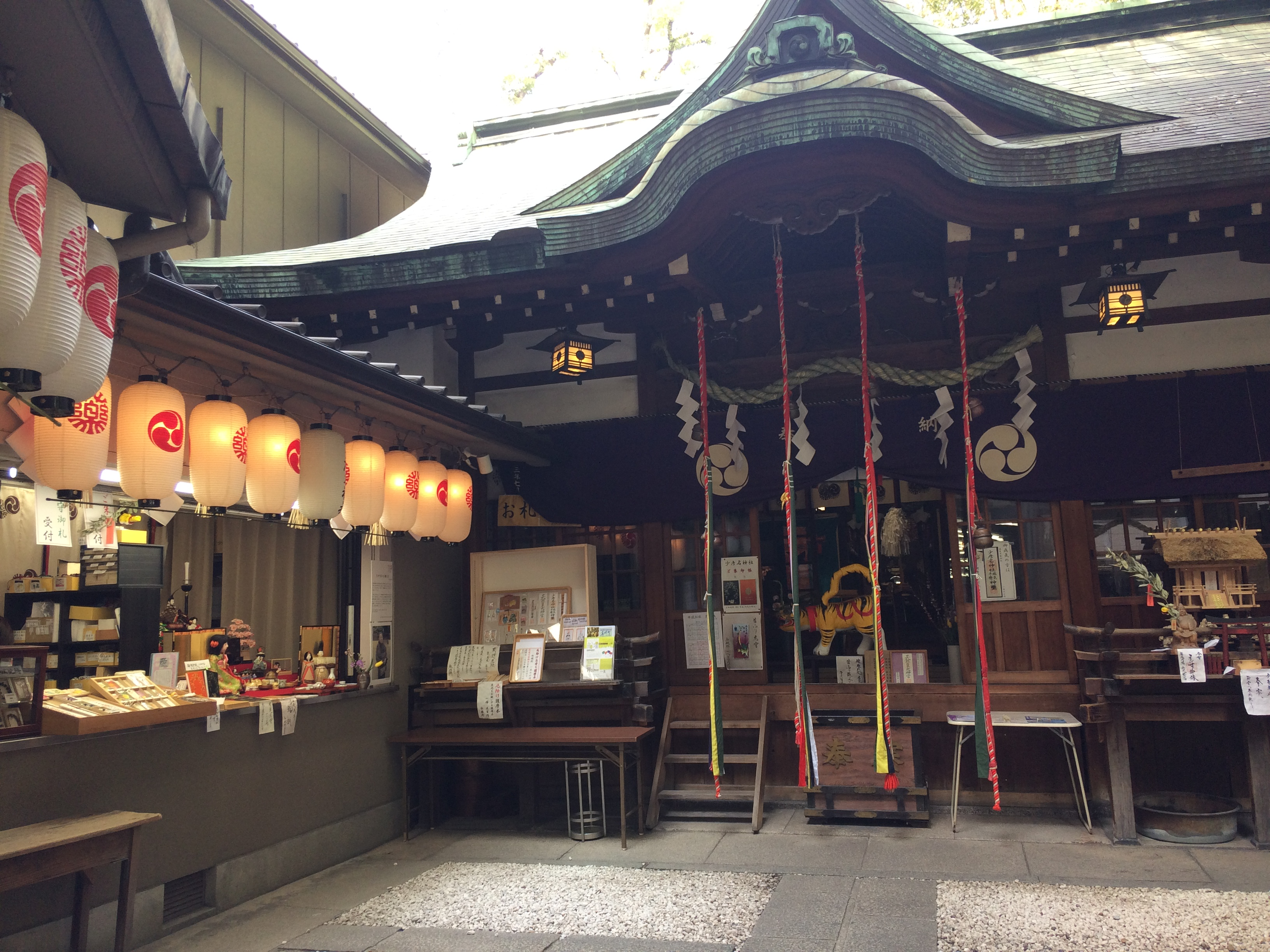
Sukunahikona shrine at Osaka

He is one of the Shinto deities enshrined at Mt. Mitake

In Noto Province there are Stone Idols said to represent Sukuna bikona and Ohana-mochi.

The Sukuna hikona shrine in Ozu city, Ehime prefecture was registered by the World Monument Foundation in 2014, "Monument List of the Endangered World."

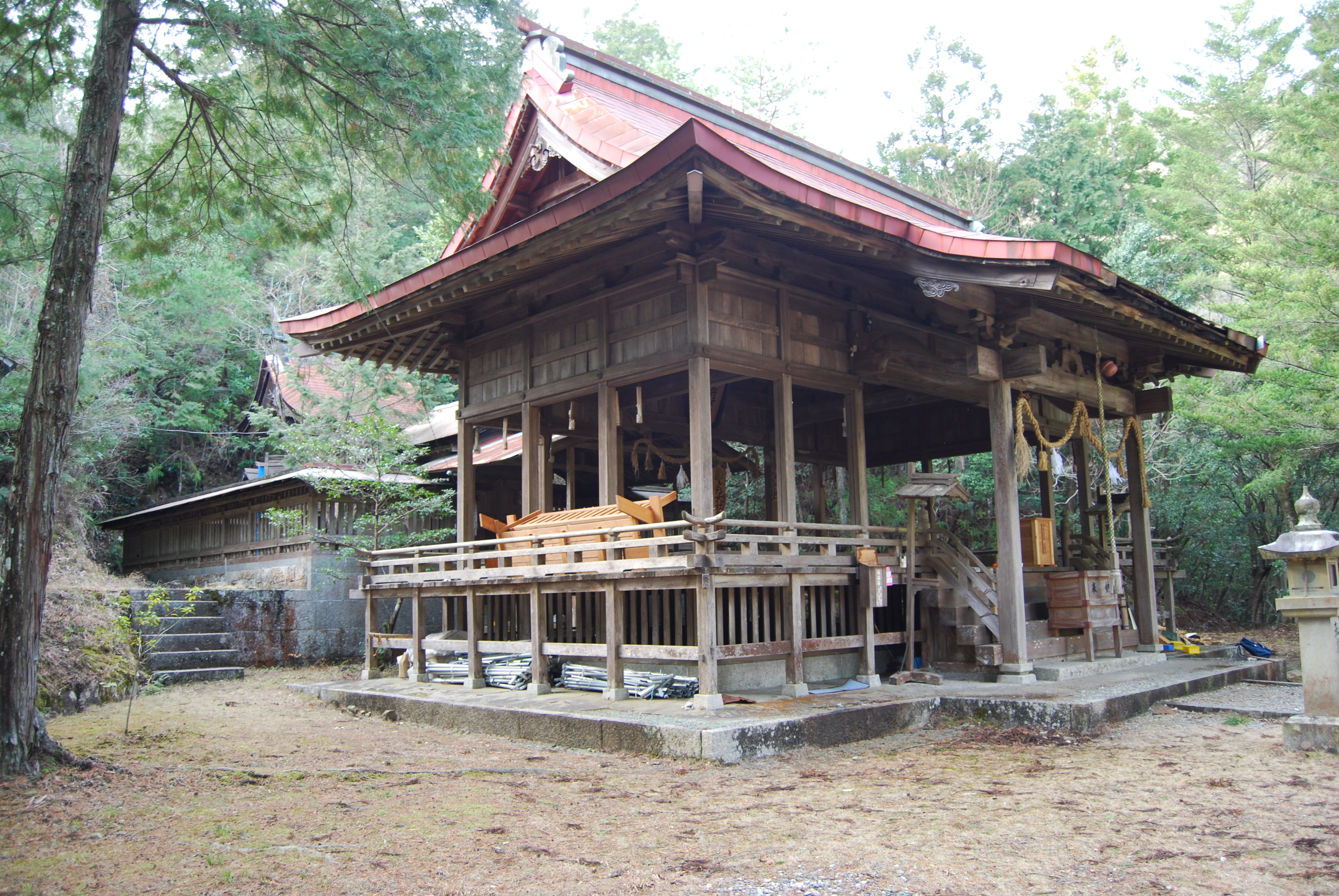
Sukunahikona haiden in Ozu city

He is enshrined at Awashima in Wakayama. Empress Jingu, while on a journey over the sea, encountered a storm and her ship almost sank. She landed on Awashima island and discovered a shrine for Sukuna Hikona. She prayed for protection and promised she would build a larger shrine in his honor if he protected her. She was granted safe passage, and fulfilled her promise. Empress Jingu was then worshipped alongside Sukuna and Okuniushi. In one version, Harisaijo, Amaterasu's daughter, is exiled to the island of Awashima for having a woman's ailment. She encounters Sukuna hino's shrine and vows to help women.

Empress Jingu is so taken by Sukuna Hikona that she carves a doll in his likeness, a hina-ningyō. This may be the origin of the Hina doll.

== As kami of healing and magic ==
Sukuna Hikona, as a kami of healing, is credited with the invention of cures for several diseases of humans and animals. He was invoked for protection against "creeping things" and "calamities." Creeping things refers to insects, snakes, and other pests that could damage crops. As a god of agriculture, farmers would pray to him for the protection of their crops. Calamities is a euphemism for unseen or spiritual forces. As a Marebito and a son of Kamimusubi, Sukuna bikona was omniscient and proficient in magic. He would offer protection in the way of spells and incantations.

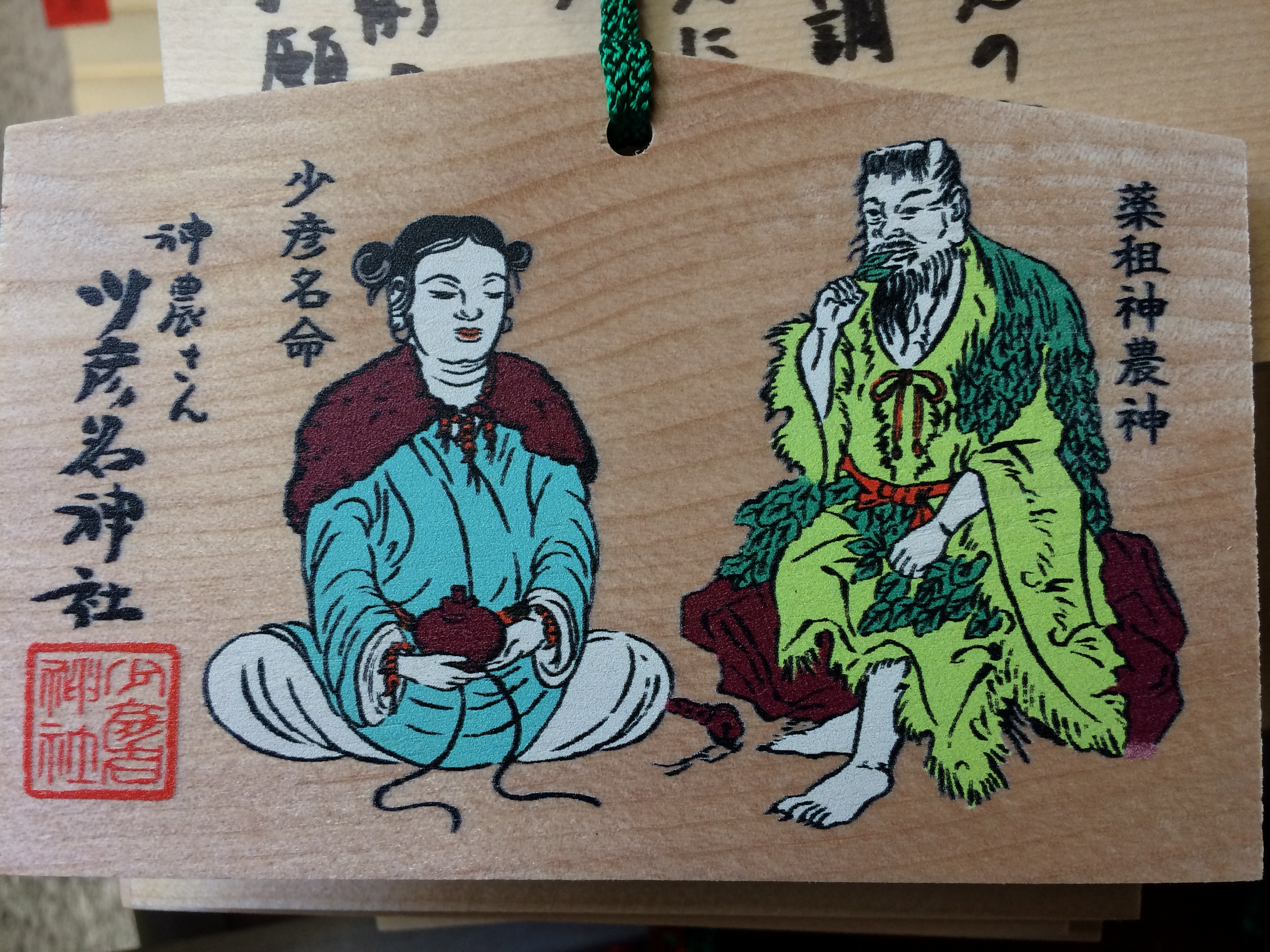
Prayer tablet (rear) of the Sukunahikona-Shrine in Osaka (Japan) showing the medicinal deities Sukunahikona (Japan) and Shennong (China)

For his interaction with Empress Jingu, who was pregnant at the time of her voyage, he is also credited with helping women's health, women's reproductive ailments, fertility, and safe childbirth.

== Eponymy ==
The asteroid 10725 Sukunabikona derives its name from the kami. Sukunaarchaeum is an Archean parasite that is provisionally named for the deity.
