= Omoikane =

Shinto god of wisdom and intelligence

- God of Wisdom, Intelligence, Knowledge and Foresight

Genealogy
- Parents: Takamimusubi
- Siblings: Futodama, Takuhadachiji-hime

Omoikane (思兼 or 思金) is a Shinto Kami of wisdom and intelligence. His name means "having the wisdom and thoughtfulness of many people". A heavenly deity who is called upon to "ponder" and give good counsel in the deliberations of the heavenly deities. In the myth where Amaterasu hid in a cave, he was entrusted with the task of finding a way to get her out. Carpenters pray to him during the construction of pillars in a building. Usually, Japanese people pray to Omoikane for success in school and exams.

He is known by other names as Tokoyo-no-Omoikane (常世思金神) in the Kojiki (古事記); Omoikane (思兼神) in the Nihon Shoki (日本書紀); Omokane (思金神, 思兼神), Tokoyo-no-Omoikane (常世思金神), Yagokoro-omoikane (八意思兼神, 八意思金神) in the Kujiki (旧事紀 or Sendai Kuji Hongi 先代旧事本紀), or Achihiko (阿智彦).

He is the son of creator deity Takamimusubi (高御産巣日神) and the older brother of Takuhatachiji-hime (栲幡千千姫命, or commonly named in the Kojiki: 万幡豊秋津師比売命 Yorozuhatatoyo'akitsushi-hime), who is married to the deity Ame-no-Oshihomimi (天忍穂耳命). In the Kojiki Tenson kōrin myth, Omoikane is one of the kami who descends to earth.

However, in the Kujiki (旧事紀 or Sendai Kyuji Hongi 先代旧事本紀). Omoikane descends to Shinano Province (信濃国 Shinano-no-kuni, a former province that is now Nagano Prefecture) to become the ancestor of Shina-no-achihouri (信之阿智祝) and as in Chichibu Province (知々夫国, Chichibu no kuni), a former province in Saitama Prefecture. He then becomes the father of both deities, Ame-no-Uwaharu (天表春命) and Ame-no-Shitaharu (天下春命), also through this lineage becomes the patriarchal ancestor of the children of Ama-no-Koyane (天児屋命, 天児屋根命).

== Shrines ==
- Achi shrine, Kurashiki, Okayama prefecture
- Chichibu shrine, Chichibu, Saitama prefecture
- Shizu shrine, Naka, Ibaraki prefecture

== See also ==
- Amaterasu
- Benzaiten
- Kuebiko
- Tenjin
