= Age of Gods =

Japanese mythological period

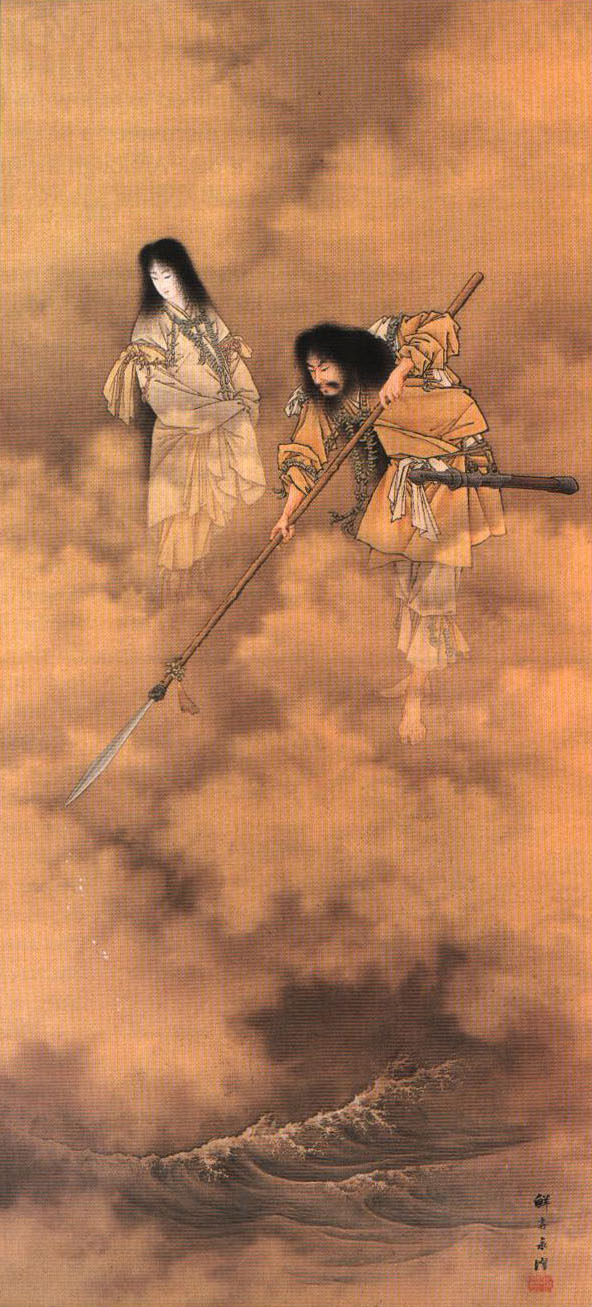
Izanami and Izanagi. Painting by Kobayashi Eitaku, c. 1885.

In Shinto chronology, the Age of Gods (神代, Kamiyo/Jindai) is the period preceding the accession of Jimmu, the first Emperor of Japan. The kamiyo myths are chronicled in the "upper roll" (Kamitsumaki) of the Kojiki and in the first and second chapters of the Nihon Shoki. The reigns of Emperor Jimmu and the subsequent Emperors are considered the Age of Humans (人代, Hitoyo).

== Origin ==
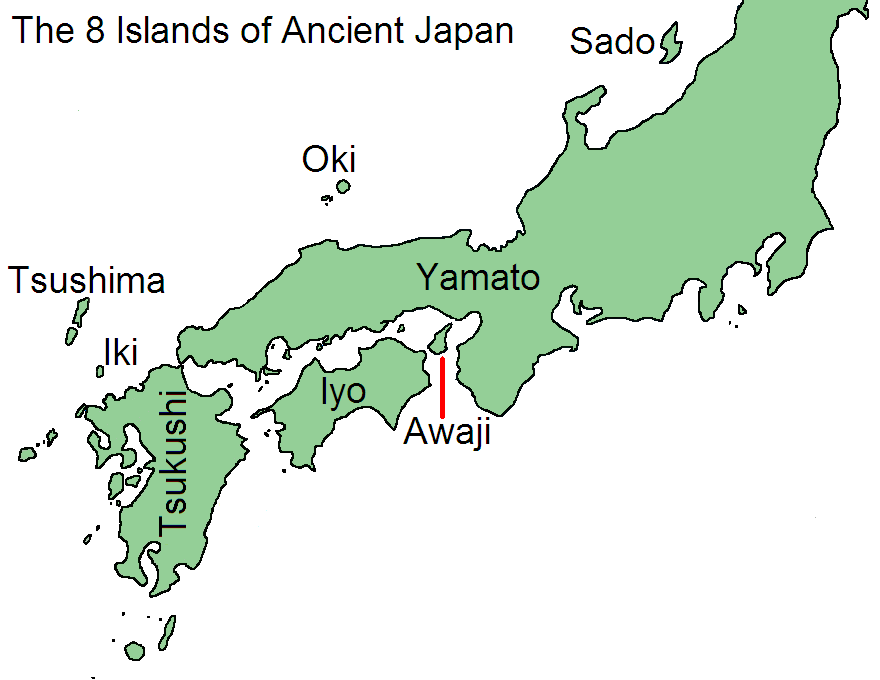

According to early mythology, the Japanese islands were created by Izanagi and Izanami, meaning "he who invites" and "she who invites". According to the Nihon Shoki, Izanami and Izanagi stood upon the Floating Bridge of Heaven, looking down upon the ocean. Using the jewel-spear of Heaven, called Amenonuhoko, given by the gods or kami before them, they thrust the spear into the ocean. When Izanagi and Izanami removed the spear, the brine dripping from its point solidified, creating the islands of Japan, Onogoro Island (“spontaneous-congealed island”). Descending down from the skies, Izanagi and Izanami create their home and create a central Heavenly August pillar. Deciding to populate the land, Izanagi circles the left side of the pillar while Izanami circles the right. Meeting each other on the other side of it, Izanami greets her love "oh, what a comely young man." Izanagi replies with "How delightfully, I have met a lovely maiden." Izanami being a woman speaking first to a man, the gods looked at this as inappropriate and cursed the couple by the children they bore. Their first child Hiruko was born as leech-like entity, had atrophic limbs, cast out by his parents via a boat of reeds down the river. Trying and trying again, they fail to conceive a proper child. The gods explain to them both about their curse and decide to give them another chance. Once again Izanagi and Izanami circle the pillar just as before, only Izanagi speaks first. Their mating now was fruitful. Izanami gave birth to the islands of Awaji, Iyo (later Shikoku), Oki, Tsukushi (later Kyūshū), Iki, Tsushima, Sado, and finally Yamato (later Honshū), the largest. They named the land Oyashimakuni, the Land of Eight Great Islands. After that, Izanami gave birth in quick succession to the other minor islands that surround the main ones, and to the main kami of sea and harbor, of wind, trees, mountains, and so on.

One kami who was conceived was the fire god, Kagutsuchi. During birth, Kagutsuchi severely burned Izanami and eventually slipped away into the Land of Yomi, the underworld. "The tears Izanagi shed at the death of his wife brought forth further deities. Angered by the sight of the newly born fire kami who had been the cause of Izanami’s death, Izanagi drew his sword and decapitated the infant. The blood coalescing on the sword brought forth eight martial kami, including the important Takemikazuchi-no-kami and his peer, Futsunushi-no-kami. Eight more fierce kami of mountains and iron emerged from the infant’s body and limbs."

In his anguish, Izanagi followed her to the underworld to rescue her and soon discovers nothing remained of his beloved Izanami but a rotting living-dead corpse, writhing with maggots, because of her partaking of the food of Yomi. Izanagi runs away in horror as Izanami shrieks in anger, sending hags of the underworld after him for his abandonment of her. Izanagi blocks the entrances of Yomi, proclaiming the end of their marriage. This slope between the lands of the living and dead is identified with a site in Matsue, in present day Shimane Prefecture. Izanami threatens him with, "Every day I shall kill one thousand people in the lands we created". Izanagi replies "Every day I shall create one thousand five hundred people".

After escaping Yomi, Izanagi preformed misogi, a purification ritual by bathing in a river to cleanse himself of the underworld's pollution. From this act, his three most important children emerged: Amaterasu, the Sun Goddess. She was known as "Heaven-Illumine-of-Great-Deity” was born from the washing of his left eye, and the Moon God, Tsukuyomi was born from the watching of his right eye. His silver radiance was not so fair as the golden effulgence of his sister, the Sun Goddess. While both sit atop the heavens, they begin their sibling rivalry, quarreling and fighting, they decide they can no longer see each other face to face, thus creating day and night, separating the two.

== In popular culture ==
In episode "Kirinmaru of the Dawn" of Yashahime: Princess Half-Demon, Kirinmaru tells Moroha the quarter demon that "Akuru is a spirit who has been around since the Age of Gods".

== See also ==
- Amaterasu
- Jindai Moji ("Symbols from the Age of Gods")
- Kamiyonanayo
- Tsukuyomi
- Yomi
- Japanese prehistory
- Golden Age
- Tenson kōrin

== Bibliography ==
- "Nihongi/Book I - Wikisource, the free online library". en.wikisource.org.
- Ashkenazi, Michael. Handbook Of Japanese Mythology. ABC-CLIO, 2003. eBook Collection (EBSCOhost). Web. 28 Mar. 2012.
- S.H.D.D. "Izanagi And Izanami." Calliope 8.7 (1998): 12. MasterFILE Premier. Web. 28 Mar. 2012
- Frederick Hadland Davis (2007). Myths and Legends of Japan. eBook Collection (EBSCOhost).
