= Umashiashikabihikoji =

Shinto creator god

Umashiashikabihikoji (宇摩志阿斯訶備比古遅; Lit. "Elderly Prince Reed-Shoot") is a kami (Shinto deity). According to the Kojiki, he came into being as a hitorigami early in the creation of the universe. He was the fourth kami to come into existence and the first to have a gendered name. The tale in the Kojiki states he came into existence from something like reed shoots that sprouted forth from oil drifting like a jellyfish when the land was young. He was preceded by Kamimusubi and followed by Ame no Tokotachi.

Umashiashikabihikoji also makes appearances in the Nihon Shoki, though there his name is Umashiashikabihikoji-no-mikoto (可美葦芽彦舅尊; Lit. "Sweet Elderly Prince Reed-Shoot") and there are several different stories, some of which claim he was the first kami, while others claim he was the second. The Nihongi does not use the term hitorigami, but it does say Umashiashikabihikoji was made entirely of male essence.
