= Takamimusubi =

Japanese god of agriculture

- Kotoamatsukami
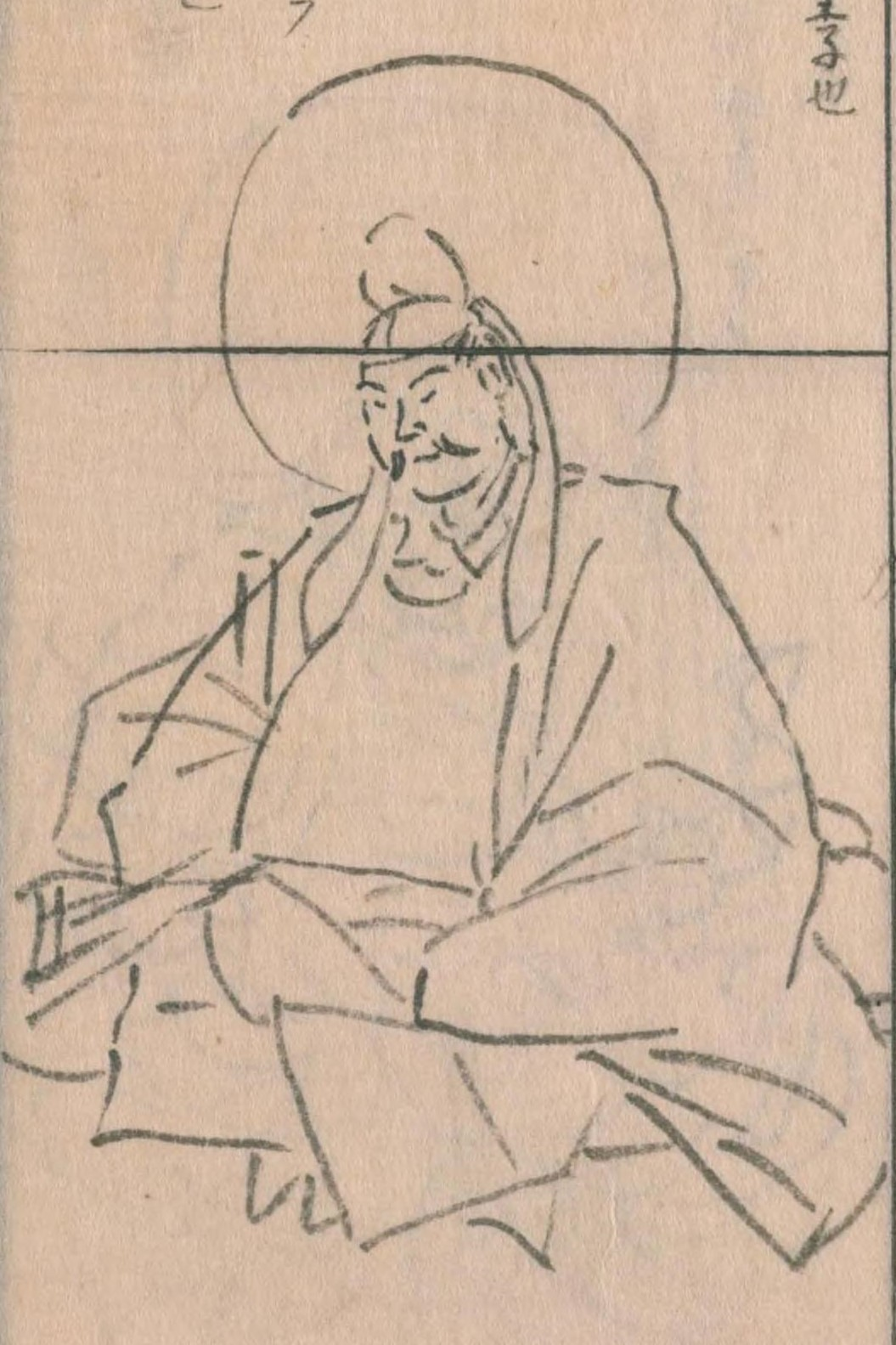
- Japanese: 高御産巣日

Genealogy
- Parents: None; self-generated
- Children: Takuhadachiji-hime; Omoikane; Futodama; Sukunabikona (Nihon Shoki)

Takamimusubi (高御産巣日, lit. "Exalted Generative Force") is a creation deity in Japanese mythology, who was the second of the first beings to come into existence.

It is speculated that Takamimusubi was originally the tutelary deity for the Japanese imperial family. According to the Kojiki, Takamimusubi was a hitorigami.

== Mythology ==
According to Kojiki, when the heaven and earth were created, Ame-no-Minakanushi was the first one to appear in Takamagahara, Takamimusubi the second, and Kamimusubi the third. Together with Amaterasu, he jointly rules the Takamagahara.

One myth tells of a bird named Nakime who was sent down to earth to check in on Amewakahiko. Amewakahiko shot the bird with his bow. The arrow pierced through the bird, but the arrow flew all the way to heaven. Takamimusubi saw the arrow and threw it back at the earth where it hit Amewakahiko while he was lying in bed, killing him.

== Family ==
He is the father of several gods including Takuhadachiji-hime (栲幡千千姫), Omoikane, Futodama (in some versions Takamimusubi is instead the grandfather of Futodama) and some versions Ame-no-oshihomimi. According to Nihon Shoki, he is the father of Sukunabikona.

According to Shinsen Shōjiroku, he is the grandfather of Tamanoya.

In one version of the Nihon Shoki, Mihotsuhime (三穂津姫) is the daughter of Takamimusubi.

He is the grandfather of Ninigi-no-Mikoto, who descended on Ashihara no Nakatsukuni first as a member of the Imperial Family and was a grandson of Amaterasu, according to the Nihon Shoki.

Amaterasu	Takamimusubi
Ame-no-oshihomimi	Takuhadachiji-hime	Ōyamatsumi
Ninigi-no-Mikoto （天孫）	Konohanasakuya-hime	Watatsumi
Hoderi	Hosuseri （海幸彦）	Hoori （山幸彦）	Toyotama-hime	Utsushihikanasaku	Furutama-no-mikoto
Tensori no Mikoto	Ugayafukiaezu	Tamayori-hime	Azumi people	（Owari clan Yamato clan)
Hayato people	Itsuse	Inahi	Mikeiri	Jimmu	Ahiratsu-hime
Imperial House of Japan	Tagishimimi

- Red background is female.
- Green background means groups
- Bold letters are three generations of Hyuga.

== Worship ==
Izumo-taisha, one of the oldest Shinto shrines, is dedicated to Takamimusubi. Towatari Shrine was converted into a Shinto shrine in the 19th century, and now enshrines several important Shinto creator deities, including Takamimusubi.

Hasshinden was once a temple that enshrined him.

== See also ==
- Musuhi
