= Kuni-no-Tokotachi =

Shinto kami

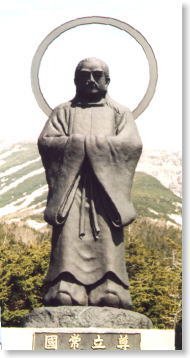

In Shinto faith, Kuninotokotachi (国之常立神; Kuninotokotachi-no-Kami, in Kojiki) (国常立尊; Kuninotokotachi-no-Mikoto, in Nihon Shoki (no-Mikoto here being an honorific of divinity)) or Kuni-toko-tachi is one of the two Gods born from "something like a reed that arose from the soil" when the Earth was chaotic. In the Kojiki, he is the first of the seven generations of Divinities born after the first five divinities were born at the time of the creation of the Universe. In the Nihon Shoki, he is the first of the three divinities born after Heaven and Earth were born out of chaos, and is born from something looking like a reed-shoot growing between heaven and earth. He is known by mythology to reside on top of Mount Fuji (富士山).

Kuninotokotachi is described as a hitorigami and genderless in Kojiki, but is described as a male god in Nihon Shoki.

This distinction reflects a broader divergence between the two chronicles' cosmogonies: the Nihon Shoki names Kuninotokotachi as the first of three deities, followed by Kuninosatsuchi and Toyokumonu, said to have arisen through the male principle alone, rather than singly and without gender as in the hitorigami tradition of the Kojiki.

Yoshida Kanetomo, the founder of the Yoshida Shintō sect, identified Kuninotokotachi with Amenominakanushi and regarded him as the primordial god of the Universe.

In Tenrikyo, Kunitokotachi-no-Mikoto is one of the Ten Aspects of God's Providence (十全の守護, jūzen no shugo).

He is a Hitorigami, or a singular divinity born early in the universe.

He came after Amenotokotachi and before Toyokumonu.

Kuni no Tokotachi
Toyokumono
Uhijini	Suhijini
Tsunugui	Ikugui
Otonoji	Otonobe
Omodaru	Ayakashikone
Izanagi	Izanami

== See also ==
- Kamiyonanayo
- Hitsukishinji
