= Hitorigami =

Shinto deities

Hitorigami (独神) are kami (in Shinto myth) who came into being alone, as opposed to those who came into being as male-female pairs. According to the Kojiki, this group includes the "three deities of creation" and the "separate heavenly kami." They are described as having hidden their bodies or their forms not being visible. Most are said to have been created from the "male essence" and, as such, are male in gender.

Two hitorigami, Kuni-no-Tokotachi and Ame-no-Minakanushi, summoned the divine pair of Izanagi and Izanami into being and charged them with creating the first land in the swirling salt water that existed below the heavens.

== List of Hitorigami ==
Three Deities of Creation

- Ame-no-Minakanushi
- Takamimusuhi
- Kamimusuhi

Separate Heavenly Kami

(partial list)

- Umashiashikabihikoji
- Amenotokotachi
- Kuni-no-Tokotachi
- Toyokumono
