= Kunitsukami =

Shinto spirits related to the earth

Kunitsukami (国つ神, 国津神) are the kami of the land and live in tsuchi (earth).

== Mythology ==
Many myths in the Nihon Shoki and the Kojiki are about the conflict between the Kunitsukami and the Amatsukami.

== List of kunitsukami ==
- Ashinazuchi
- Okuninushi
- Ōyamatsumi
- Sarutahiko
- Tenazuchi
- Sovereign God
  - Ōkuninushi
- Ōkuninushi no Gokojin
  - Ajisukitakahikone
  - Kizumata god
  - Kotoshironushi
  - Shimo-shitsu-biki
  - Takeminakata
  - Tora-kami god
  - Dokiri Vipassana
  - Kamiya Taten Vipassana
  - Numagawa Vipassana
  - Suseri Vipassana
  - Tottorijin
  - Yagami Vipassana
- Others
  - Chikato no Kami
  - Ichikishimahime
  - Isetsuhiko
  - Kushinadahime
  - Moreya
  - Omizunu
  - Ōmononushi
  - Ōyamatsumi
  - Taka Kagyu

== See also ==
- Aesir
- Vanir
- Heavenly and Earthly crimes
- Jinushigami
- Ujigami
- Houtu
  - City God
  - Dizhu shen
  - Tudigong
- Okunitama
