= Kami =

Divine being in Shinto

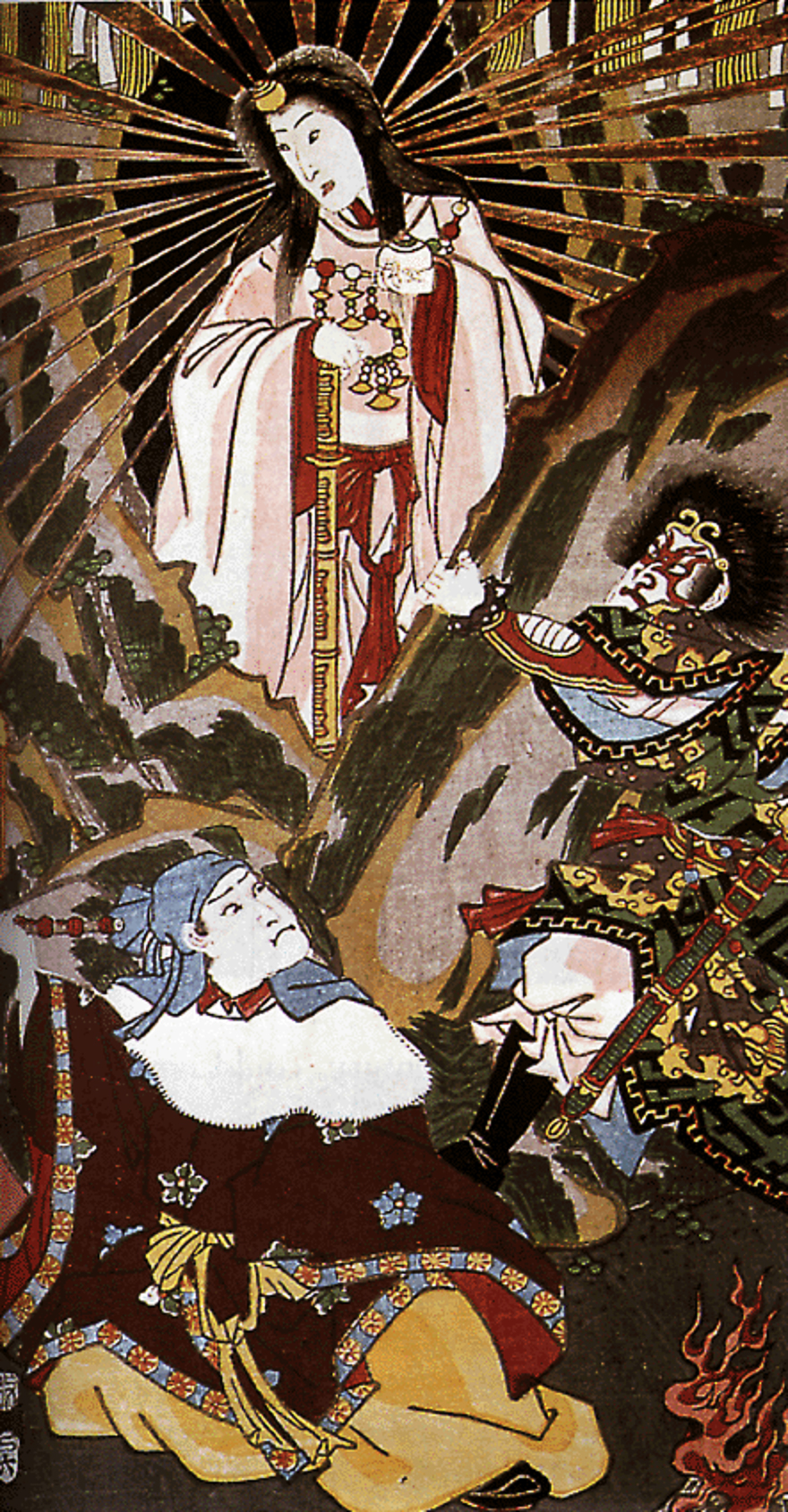
Amaterasu, one of the central kami in the Shinto faith

Kami (Japanese: 神; [kaꜜmi]) are the deities, divinities, spirits, and mythological, spiritual, or natural phenomena that are venerated in the traditional Shinto religion of Japan. Kami can be elements of the landscape, forces of nature, beings, and the qualities that these beings express, as well as the spirits of venerated dead people. Many kami are considered the ancient ancestors of entire clans (some ancestors become kami upon their death if they were able to embody the values and virtues of kami in life). Traditionally, great leaders like the emperor could be or become kami.

In Shinto, kami are not separate from nature, but are of nature, possessing positive and negative, and good and evil characteristics. They are manifestations of musubi (結び), the interconnecting energy of the universe, and are considered exemplary of what humanity should strive towards . Kami are believed to be "hidden" from this world, and inhabit a complementary existence that mirrors our own: shinkai (神界; "the world of the kami"). To be in harmony with the awe-inspiring aspects of nature is to be conscious of kannagara no michi (随神の道 or 惟神の道; "the way of the kami").

== Meaning ==
Kami is the Japanese word for a deity, divinity, or spirit. It has been used to describe mind, God, Supreme Being, one of the Shinto deities, an effigy, a principle, and anything that is worshipped.

Although deity is the common interpretation of kami, some Shinto scholars argue that such a translation can cause a misunderstanding of the term.

Some etymological suggestions are:

- Kami may, at its root, simply mean spirit, or an aspect of spirituality. It is written with the kanji 神, Sino-Japanese reading shin or jin. In Chinese, the character means deity or spirit.
- In the Ainu language, the word kamuy refers to an animistic concept very similar to Japanese kami. The matter of the words' origins is still a subject of debate; John Batchelor derives the word from Ainu roots, but Japanese sources indicate a Japonic origin.

In terms of meaning, in his Kojiki-den, Motoori Norinaga gave a definition of kami as: "any being whatsoever which possesses some eminent quality out of the ordinary, and is awe-inspiring, is called kami."

Because Japanese does not normally distinguish grammatical number in nouns (most do not have singular and plural forms), it is sometimes unclear whether kami refers to a single or multiple entities. When a singular concept is needed, -kami (神) is used as a suffix. The reduplicated term generally used to refer to multiple kami is kamigami.

== History ==
While Shinto has no founder, no overarching doctrine, and no religious texts, the Kojiki (Records of Ancient Matters), written in 712 CE, and the Nihon Shoki (Chronicles of Japan), written in 720 CE, contain the earliest record of Japanese creation myths. The Kojiki also includes descriptions of various kami.

In the ancient traditions there were five defining characteristics of kami:

1. Kami are of two minds. They can nurture and love when respected, or they can cause destruction and disharmony when disregarded. Kami must be appeased in order to gain their favor and avoid their wrath. Traditionally, kami possess two souls, one gentle (nigi-mitama) and the other assertive (ara-mitama); additionally, in Yamakage Shinto (see Ko-Shintō), kami have two additional souls that are hidden: one happy (saki-mitama) and one mysterious (kushi-mitama).
2. Kami are not visible to the human realm. Instead, they inhabit sacred places, natural phenomena, or people during rituals that ask for their blessing.
3. They are mobile, visiting their places of worship, of which there can be several, but never staying forever.
4. There are many different varieties of kami. There are 300 different classifications of kami listed in the Kojiki, and they all have different functions, such as the kami of wind, kami of entryways, and kami of roads.
5. Lastly, all kami have a different guardianship or duty to the people around them. Just as the people have an obligation to keep the kami happy, the kami have to perform the specific function of the object, place, or idea they inhabit.

Kami are an ever-changing concept, but their presence in Japanese life has remained constant. The kami's earliest roles were as earth-based spirits, assisting the early hunter-gatherer groups in their daily lives. They were worshipped as gods of the earth (mountains) and sea. As the cultivation of rice became increasingly important and predominant in Japan, the kami's identity shifted to more sustaining roles that were directly involved in the growth of crops; roles such as rain, earth, and rice. This relationship between early Japanese people and the kami was manifested in rituals and ceremonies meant to entreat the kami to grow and protect the harvest. These rituals also became a symbol of power and strength for the early Emperors.

There is a strong tradition of myth-histories in the Shinto faith; one such myth details the appearance of the first emperor, grandson of the Sun Goddess Amaterasu. In this myth, when Amaterasu sent her grandson to earth to rule, she gave him five rice grains, which had been grown in the fields of heaven (Takamagahara). This rice made it possible for him to transform the "wilderness".

Social and political strife have played a key role in the development of new sorts of kami, specifically the goryō-shin (the sacred spirit kami). Goryō are the vengeful spirits of the dead whose lives were cut short, but they were calmed by the devotion of Shinto followers and are now believed to punish those who do not honor the kami.

The pantheon of kami, like the kami themselves, is forever changing in definition and scope. As the needs of the people have shifted, so too have the domains and roles of the various kami. Some examples of this are related to health, such as the kami of smallpox whose role was expanded to include all contagious diseases, or the kami of boils and growths who has also come to preside over cancers and cancer treatments.

In ancient animistic Japanese belief, kami were understood as simply the divine forces of nature. Worshippers in ancient Japan revered kami of nature which exhibited a particular beauty and power such as ghosts, the ocean, the sun, waterfalls, mountains, boulders, animals, trees, grasses, rice paddies, thunder, echoes, foxes and fox spirits, and Asian dragons. They strongly believed the spirits or resident kami deserved respect.

In 927 CE, the Engi-shiki (延喜式; literally, Procedures of the Engi Era) was promulgated in fifty volumes. This, the first formal codification of Shinto rites and norito (liturgies and prayers) to survive, became the basis for all subsequent Shinto liturgical practice and efforts. It listed all of the 2,861 Shinto shrines existing at the time, and the 3,131 official-recognized and enshrined kami. The number of kami has grown and far exceeded this figure through the following generations as there are over 2,446,000 individual kami enshrined in Tokyo's Yasukuni Shrine alone.

== Shinto belief ==
Kami are the central objects of worship in Shinto. The best English translation of kami is 'spirits', but this is an over-simplification of a complex concept—kami can be elements of the landscape or forces of nature. Kami are believed to have influence over the forces of nature and over the affairs of humans. The ancient animistic spirituality of Japan was the beginning of modern Shinto, which became a formal spiritual institution later, in an effort to preserve the traditional beliefs from the encroachment of imported religious ideas. As a result, the nature of what can be called kami is very general and encompasses many different concepts and phenomena.

Some of the objects or phenomena designated as kami are qualities of growth, fertility, and production; natural phenomena like wind and thunder; natural objects like the sun, mountains, rivers, trees, and rocks; some animals; and ancestral spirits. Included within the designation of ancestral spirits are spirits of the ancestors of the Imperial House of Japan, but also ancestors of noble families, as well as the spirits of the ancestors of all people, which, when they died, were believed to be the guardians of their descendants.

There are other spirits designated as kami as well. For example, the guardian spirits of the land, occupations, and skills; spirits of Japanese heroes; those of outstanding deeds or virtues; those who have contributed to civilization, culture, and human welfare; those who have died for the state or the community; and the pitiable deceased. Not only spirits superior to humans can be considered kami: spirits that are considered pitiable or weak have also been considered kami in Shinto.

The concept of kami has been changed and refined since ancient times, although anything considered to be kami by ancient people will still be considered kami in modern Shinto. Even within modern Shinto, no clearly defined criteria exist for what should or should not be worshipped as kami. The difference between modern Shinto and the ancient animistic religions is mainly a refinement of the concept, rather than a difference in definitions.

Although the ancient designations are still adhered to, in modern Shinto, many priests also consider kami to be anthropomorphic spirits with nobility and authority. One such example is the mythological figure Amaterasu-ōmikami, the sun goddess of the Shinto pantheon. Although kami can be considered deities, they are not necessarily considered omnipotent or omniscient; like the ancient Greek gods, kami have flawed personalities and are incapable of ignoble acts. In the myths of Amaterasu, for example, she could see the events of the human world, but had to use divination rituals to see the future.

There are considered to be three main variations of kami: Amatsukami (天津神; the heavenly deities), Kunitsukami (国津神; the gods of the earthly realm), and ya-o-yorozu no kami (八百万の神; countless kami). "八百万" literally means eight million, but idiomatically it expresses "uncountably many" and "all-around"—like many East Asian cultures, the Japanese often use the number 8, representing the cardinal and ordinal directions, to symbolize ubiquity. These classifications of kami are not considered strictly divided, due to the fluid and shifting nature of kami, but are instead held as guidelines for grouping them.

The ancestors of one's family can also be worshipped as kami. In this sense, these kami are worshipped not because of their godly powers, but because of a distinctive quality or virtue. An example of this is Tenjin, who was Sugawara no Michizane (845–903 CE) in life. These kami are celebrated regionally, and miniature shrines (hokora) have been built in their honor.

Within Shinto, it is believed that the nature of life is sacred because the kami began human life. Yet humans cannot perceive the sacredness the kami created without assistance. Therefore, magokoro (真心), or purification, is necessary to see the divine nature. This purification can only be granted by the kami. To please the kami and earn magokoro, Shinto followers are taught to uphold the four affirmations of Shinto.

The first affirmation is to hold fast to tradition and one's family line. Family is seen as the main mechanism by which traditions are preserved. For instance, a given tradition may be observed and passed on to future generations at marriage or birth. The second affirmation is to have a love of nature. Nature objects are worshipped as sacred because the kami inhabit them. Therefore, to be in contact with nature means to be in contact with the gods. The third affirmation is to maintain physical cleanliness. Followers of Shinto take baths, wash their hands, and rinse out their mouths often. The last affirmation is to practice matsuri, which is the worship and honor given to the kami and ancestral spirits.

Shinto followers also believe that the kami are the ones who can either grant blessings or curses to a person. Shinto believers desire to appease the evil kami to "stay on their good side" and please the good kami. In addition to practicing the four affirmations daily, Shinto believers also wear omamori to aid them in remaining pure and protected. Mamori are charms that keep the evil kami from striking a human with sickness or causing disaster to befall them.

The kami are both worshipped and respected within the religion of Shinto. The goal of life to Shinto believers is to obtain magokoro, a pure sincere heart, which can only be granted by the kami. As a result, Shinto followers are taught that humankind should venerate both the living and the nonliving, because both possess a divine superior spirit within: the kami.

=== Amatsukami and Kunitsukami ===
Amatsukami and Kunitsukami are categories of kami in Japanese mythology.

"Amatsukami" is a generic term for the gods in Takamagahara, or those who descended from Tenson kōrin, while "Kunitsukami" is a generic term for the gods who appeared on the earth (Ashihara no Nakatsukuni).

In Japanese mythology, the acceptance of the transfer of the land (Ashihara no Nakatsukuni) by the Kunitsukami to the Amatsu deities led by Ninigi-no-Mikoto is described as kuni-yuzuri. It is thought that the deity worshipped by the people of the region pacified by the Yamato Kingship (i.e., the Emishi, Hayato, etc.) became the Kunitsukami; the deities worshipped by the imperial family and powerful clans of the Yamato Kingship became the Amatsukami. Many of the original traditions of the Kunitsukami were altered when they were incorporated into the Nihon Shoki (The Chronicles of Japan); many did not survive. The Chronicles of Japan give some references to earlier traditions (e.g., "Ichi Sho Saying" and "Aru Hon Yun" in most volumes of the Nihon Shoki), but the original recorded documents have been lost.

Tsu is a case particle in Old Japanese, meaning "god of heaven" or "god of the country" in modern Japanese. Sometimes written "Amatsugami" or "Kunitsugami.

Amatsukami are also called Tenjin, and Kunitsukami are called Chigi (地祇). Some people believe that the names "Tenjin Chigi (天神地祇)" and "Jingi (神祇)" are derived from the Chinese classics. A different theory that the concept is completely different and different from the Japanese one has been presented.

Another similar concept is Tenchi Shinmei (天地神明).

天地神明 (Tenchi-Shinmei) is a Japanese four-character idiom that refers to the gods of heaven and earth. It is used in expressions such as "I swear by the gods of heaven and earth" and conveys a sense of reverence and commitment. The origins of the term can be traced back to ancient Chinese classical texts, where the expression "天地" (Tenchi) and "神明" (Shinmei) were often used together to refer to the gods of heaven and earth, or to the gods and the universe as a whole. However, there are also instances where the expression was used to refer specifically to the gods of heaven and earth. In Japan, the term 天地神明 has been in use for centuries and is often associated with the image of the numerous gods and deities that have been worshipped in Japanese folklore and mythology.

Susanoo-no-Mikoto, who was cast out of Takamagahara, and his descendants, such as Ōkuninushi, are considered to be Kunitsukami.

Ogasawara Shozo proposed a system justifying Japanese Imperialism wherein Japanese people in the colonies were seen as Amatsukami and natives were seen as Kunitsukami. However, he was later censored, as his position was considered too supportive of the rights of colonized peoples.

== Ceremonies and festivals ==
One of the first recorded rituals is Niiname-sai (新嘗祭), the ceremony in which the emperor of Japan offers newly harvested rice to the kami to secure their blessing for a bountiful harvest. A yearly festival, Niiname-sai, is also performed when a new emperor comes to power, in which case it is called Daijō-sai (大嘗祭). In the ceremony, the emperor offers crops from the new harvest to the kami, including rice, fish, fruits, soup, and stew. The emperor first feasts with the deities, then the guests. The feast could go on for some time; for example, Emperor Shōwa's feast spanned two days.

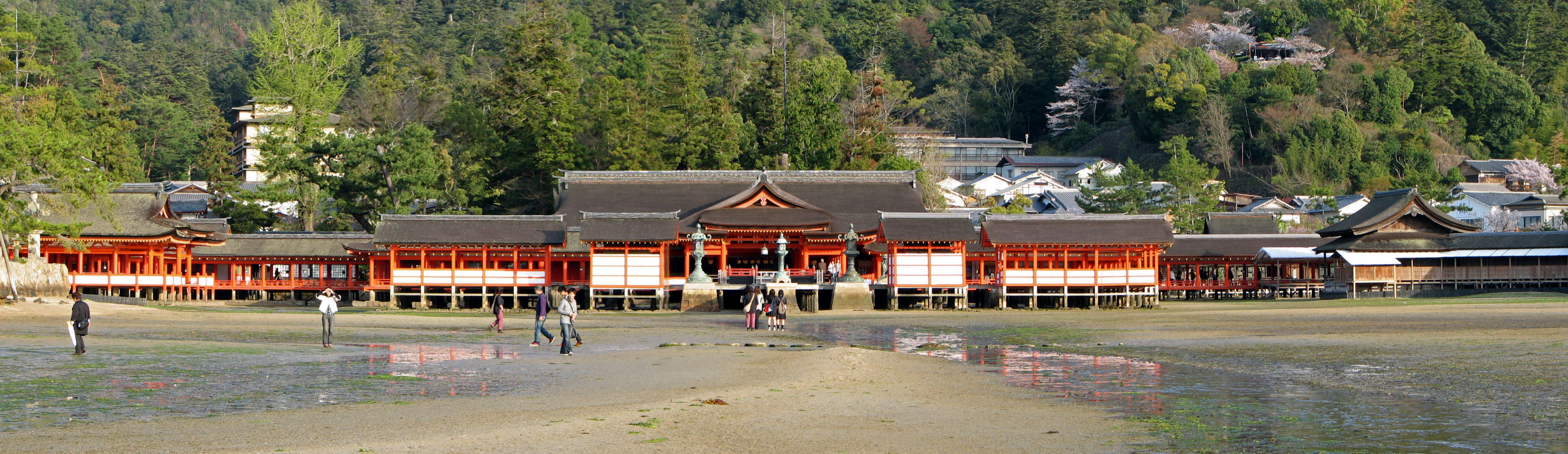
Itsukushima Shinto Shrine, Miyajima Island, Hiroshima Prefecture, Japan. This shrine is believed to be where the kami dwell, and hosts many ceremonies and festivals.

Visitors to a Shinto shrine follow a purification ritual before presenting themselves to the kami. This ritual begins with hand washing and swallowing and later spitting a small amount of water in front of the shrine to purify the body, heart, and mind. Once this is complete, they focus on gaining the kami's attention. The traditional method of doing this is to bow twice, clap twice, and bow again, alerting the kami to their presence and desire to commune with them. During the last bow, the supplicant offers words of gratitude and praise to the kami; if they are offering a prayer for aid, they will also state their name and address. After the prayer and / or worship, they repeat the two bows, two claps, and a final bow in conclusion.

Shinto practitioners also worship at home. This is done at a kamidana (household shrine), on which an ofuda with the name of their protector or ancestral kami is positioned. Their protector kami is determined by their or their ancestors' relationship to the kami.

Ascetic practices, shrine rituals and ceremonies, and Japanese festivals are the most public ways Shinto devotees celebrate and offer adoration for the kami. Kami are celebrated during their distinct festivals that usually take place at the shrines dedicated to their worship. Many festivals involve believers, who are oftentimes intoxicated, parading, sometimes running, toward the shrine while carrying mikoshi (portable shrines) as the community gathers for the festival ceremony. Yamamoto Guji, the high priest at the Tsubaki Grand Shrine, explains that this practice honors the kami because "it is in the festival, the matsuri, the greatest celebration of life can be seen in the world of Shinto and it is the people of the community who attend festivals as groups, as a whole village who are seeking to unlock the human potential as children of kami". During the New Year Festival, families purify and clean their houses in preparation for the upcoming year. Offerings are also made to the ancestors so that they will bless the family in the future year.

Shinto ceremonies are so long and complex that in some shrines, it can take ten years for the priests to learn them. The priesthood was traditionally hereditary. Some shrines have drawn their priests from the same families for over a hundred generations. It is not uncommon for the clergy to be female priestesses. The priests (kannushi) may be assisted by miko, young unmarried women acting as shrine maidens. Neither priests nor priestesses live as ascetics; in fact, it is common for them to be married, and they are not traditionally expected to meditate. Rather, they are considered specialists in the art of maintaining the connection between the kami and the people.

In addition to these festivals, ceremonies marking rites of passage are also performed within the shrines. Two such ceremonies are the birth of a child and the Shichi-Go-San. When a child is born, they are brought to a shrine so that they can be initiated as a new believer and the kami can bless them and their future life. The Shichi-Go-San (the Seven-Five-Three) is a rite of passage for five-year-old boys and three- or seven-year-old girls. It is a time for these young children to personally offer thanks for the kami's protection and to pray for continued health.

Shinto believers practice many other rites of passage, and there are also many other festivals. The main reason for these ceremonies is so that Shinto followers can appease the kami in order to reach magokoro. Magokoro can only be received through the kami. Ceremonies and festivals are long and complex because they need to be perfect to satisfy the kami. If the kami are not pleased with these ceremonies, they will not grant a Shinto believer magokoro. 69

== Notable kami ==
- Amaterasu Ōmikami, the sun goddess and chief deity of Shinto
- Ebisu, one of seven gods of fortune
- Fūjin, the god of wind
- Hachiman, the tutelary god of war
- Inari Ōkami, the god of rice and agriculture
- Izanagi-no-Mikoto, the first man
- Izanami-no-Mikoto, the first woman
- Kotoamatsukami, the primary kami trio
- Meiji Tennō
- Omoikane, the deity of wisdom
- Raijin, the god of lightning, thunder and storms
- Ryūjin, the Japanese dragon god of sea and storms
- Sarutahiko Ōkami, the kami of earth
- Susanoo-no-Mikoto, the god of the sea and storms
- Tenjin, the poetry god
- Tsukuyomi-no-Mikoto, the moon god
- Yamato Iware-biko no Mikoto, Japanese emperors

== See also ==
- Ainu religion
- Chinese folk religion
- Elemental
- Wight
- Glossary of Shinto
- Kadomatsu – Traditional Japanese decoration as yorishiro of the New Year
- Ko-Shintō – Animistic religion of Jōmon-period Japan
- Fairy
- Kotodama – Japanese belief that mystical powers dwell in words and names
- Nymph
- Landvættir
- List of divinities in Japanese mythology § Shinto
- Ryukyuan religion – Indigenous Ryukyuan belief system
- Sinryeong – Korean deities – Divine spirit in Korean religion
- Shen – God or spirit in Chinese religion
- Tsukumogami—Tools that have acquired a kami or spirit
- Tuatha Dé Danann
