= Takamagahara =

Japanese mythological place

In Japanese mythology, Takamagahara (高天原; "Plain of High Heaven" or "High Plain of Heaven"), also read as Takaamanohara, Takamanohara, Takaamagahara, or Takaamahara, is the abode of the heavenly gods (amatsukami). Often depicted as located up in the sky, it is believed to be connected to the Earth by the bridge Ame-no-ukihashi (the "Floating Bridge of Heaven").

== Overview ==
In Shinto, ame (heaven) is a lofty, sacred world, the home of the Kotoamatsukami. Some scholars have attempted to explain the myth of descent of the gods from the Takamagahara as an allegory of the migration of peoples. However, it is likely to have referred from the beginning to a higher world in a religious sense. A Shinto myth explains that at the time of creation, light, pure elements branched off to become heaven (ame). Heavy, turbid elements branched off to become earth (tsuchi). Ame became the home of the amatsukami or gods of heaven, while tsuchi became the home of kunitsukami or gods of the land. The amatsukami are said to have descended from heaven to pacify and perfect this world.

== According to the Kojiki ==
In the beginning of the Kojiki (Records of Ancient Matters), Takamagahara is mentioned as the birthplace of the gods. It is assumed that Takamagahara existed in clouds above sea because there is a scene in which Kuniumi (国生み), the god of islands, lowers his spear to form an island. Also, when the goddess of the sun, Amaterasu (天照大御神) was born, she was commanded to rule Takamagahara by Izanagi (伊弉諾), the creator deity of creation and life. In the part related to Susanoo (スサノヲ, the brother of Amaterasu), Takamagahara is described as the place where many gods live with Ama-no-yasukawa (天の安河), Ama-no-iwato (天岩戸), paddy fields, and a place for weaving, giving an impression that life was close to the human world. It is stated that the Ashihara-no-Nakatsukuni (葦原の中つ国, the world between Heaven and Hell) was subjugated by the gods from Takamagahara, and the grandson of Amaterasu, Ninigi-no-Mikoto (瓊瓊杵尊), descended from Takamagahara to rule the area. From then on, the emperor, a descendant of Ninigi-no-Mikoto owned Ashihara-no-Nakatsukuni.

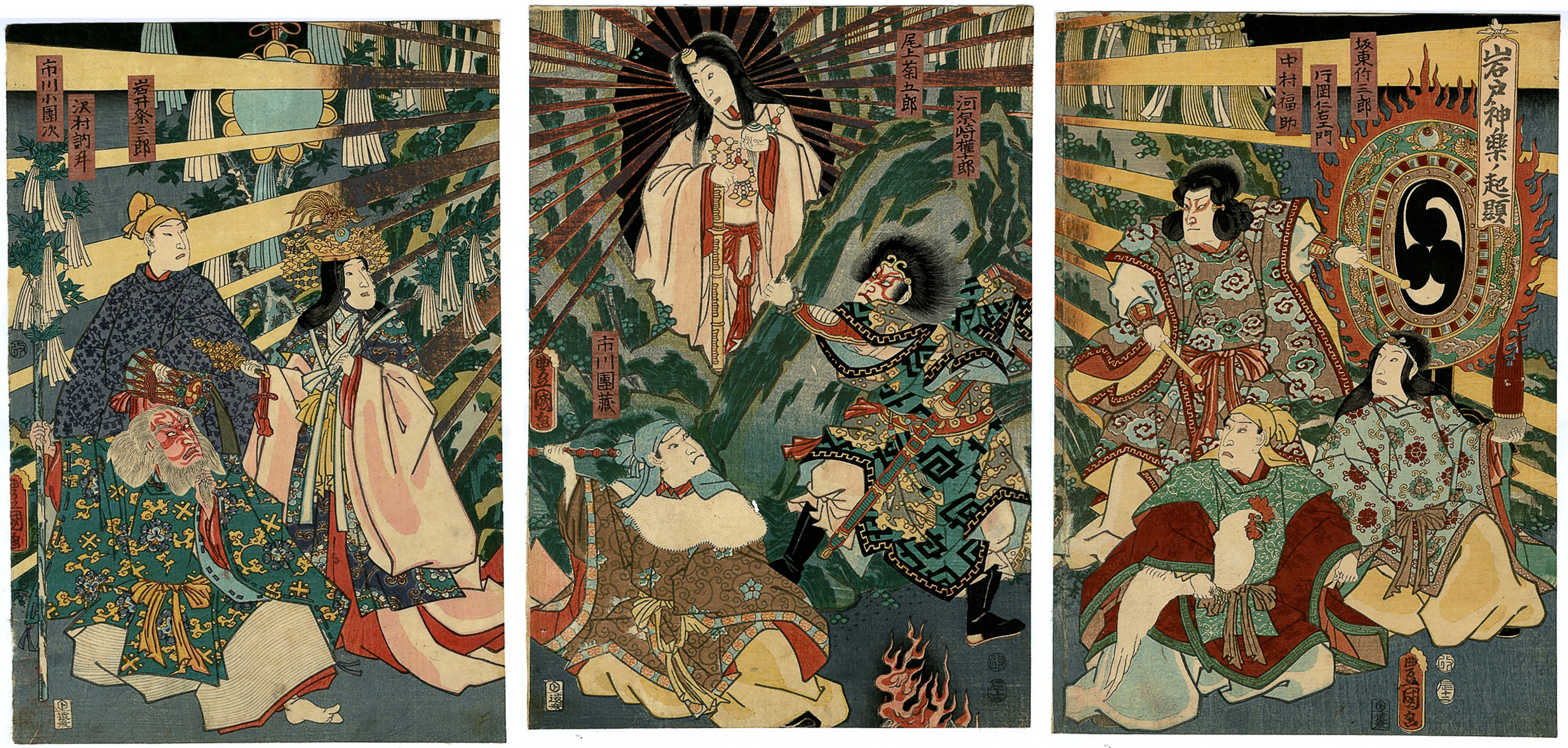
Amaterasu, the Goddess of the sun and the universe.

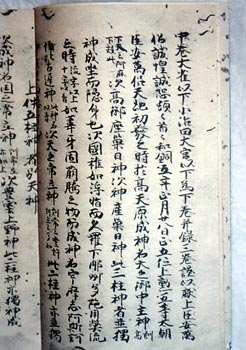
A page from the Shinpukuji manuscript of the Kojiki

== According to the other chronicles ==
In the Nihon Shoki (日本書紀, The Chronicles of Japan), there is almost no mention of Takamagahara in the text. It appears only in the fourth book of the first stage of Jindaiki (神代記) and part of the posthumous name which was given to Empress Jito in the fourth year of the Yoro era (720).

In contrast, in the Fudoki (風土記, ancient reports on provincial culture and oral tradition) written in the Nara period (710–794), the word Takamagahara appears only at the beginning of Hitachi-no-Kuni-Fudoki (常陸の国風土記).

Similarly, in the main text of Kogo Shui (古語拾遺), a historical record written in the early Heian period (794–1185), Takamagahara is mentioned only in the section of Ninigi-no-Mikoto.

In modern times, Takamagahara was described as the "supreme celestial sphere" (至美天球) in Tales of the Spirit World (霊界物語) by Onisaburo Deguchi. The "supreme celestial sphere" is illustrated as a spiritual world of pure light in the radiant universe.

== Theories about the location ==
There have been many theories about the location of Takamagahara. Theories differ greatly depending on how the mythology in the Kojiki is interpreted.

=== 1. Celestial theory ===
According to the celestial theory, the gods must be in the heavens or the universe above the heavens since high heavens are the dwelling place of the gods. This conceptual view is represented by Norinaga Motoori's theory; he believed it was disrespectful to gods and emperors to consider other theories. This idea was the mainstream view before World War II because of its strong connection with the emperor-centered historiography.

=== 2. Terrestrial theory ===
The terrestrial theory suggests that mythology always contains some historical fact, and thus Takamagahara must also reflect what existed. This theory was first represented by Hakuseki Arai, a confucianist during middle of the Edo period. Specifically, he stated that Takamagahara was located in Taga County, Hitachi Province (常陸国). Also, some people believe Takamagahara existed, but outside of Japan; one of the most popular such theories locates it at Gangwon, South Korea. A chief proponent was the World War II war criminal, General Kanji Ishiwara.

=== 3. Kyushu-Yamatai-koku theory ===
The Kyushu-Yamatai-koku theory is that any of the candidate sites for the Yamatai-koku such as Yamamoto Country, Mii Country, Yamato Country, and Yasu Country in the Chikugo River basin. Some people specifically believe that Mii Country is the Takamagahara and Nakoku is the Ashihara-no-Nakatsukuni.

=== 4. Artificiality theory ===
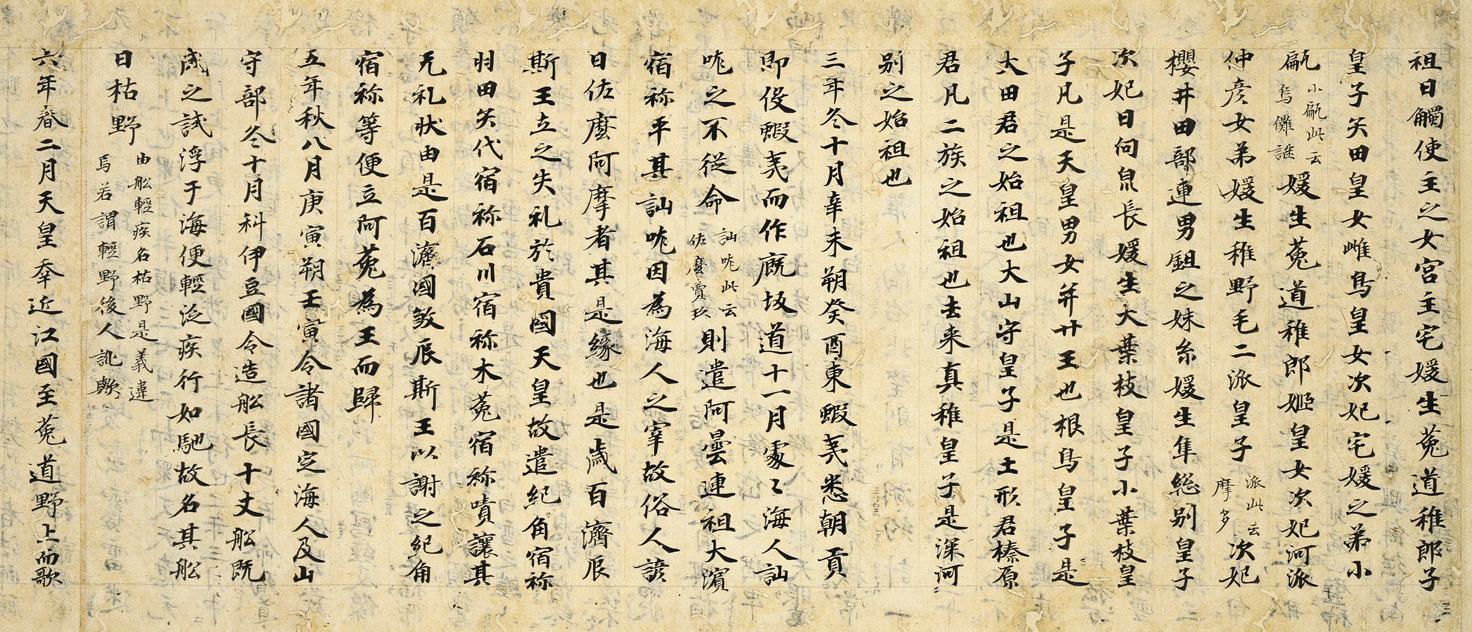
A page from the Nihon Shoki

The artificiality theory proposes that wondering about location of Takamagahara is meaningless since myths are made up. Banto Yamagata, a scholar of Confucianism from the late Edo period, argues that the Jindai period (神代, Age of the Gods) in the Kojiki was a fiction created by later generations. A historian in 20th century, Sokichi Tsuda's view of history, which has become mainstream after the World War II, is based on his idea. Many scholars today also believe that the mythology of Takamagahara in Kojiki was created by the ruling class to make people believe that the class was precious because they originated in the heavenly realm.

== In Japan ==
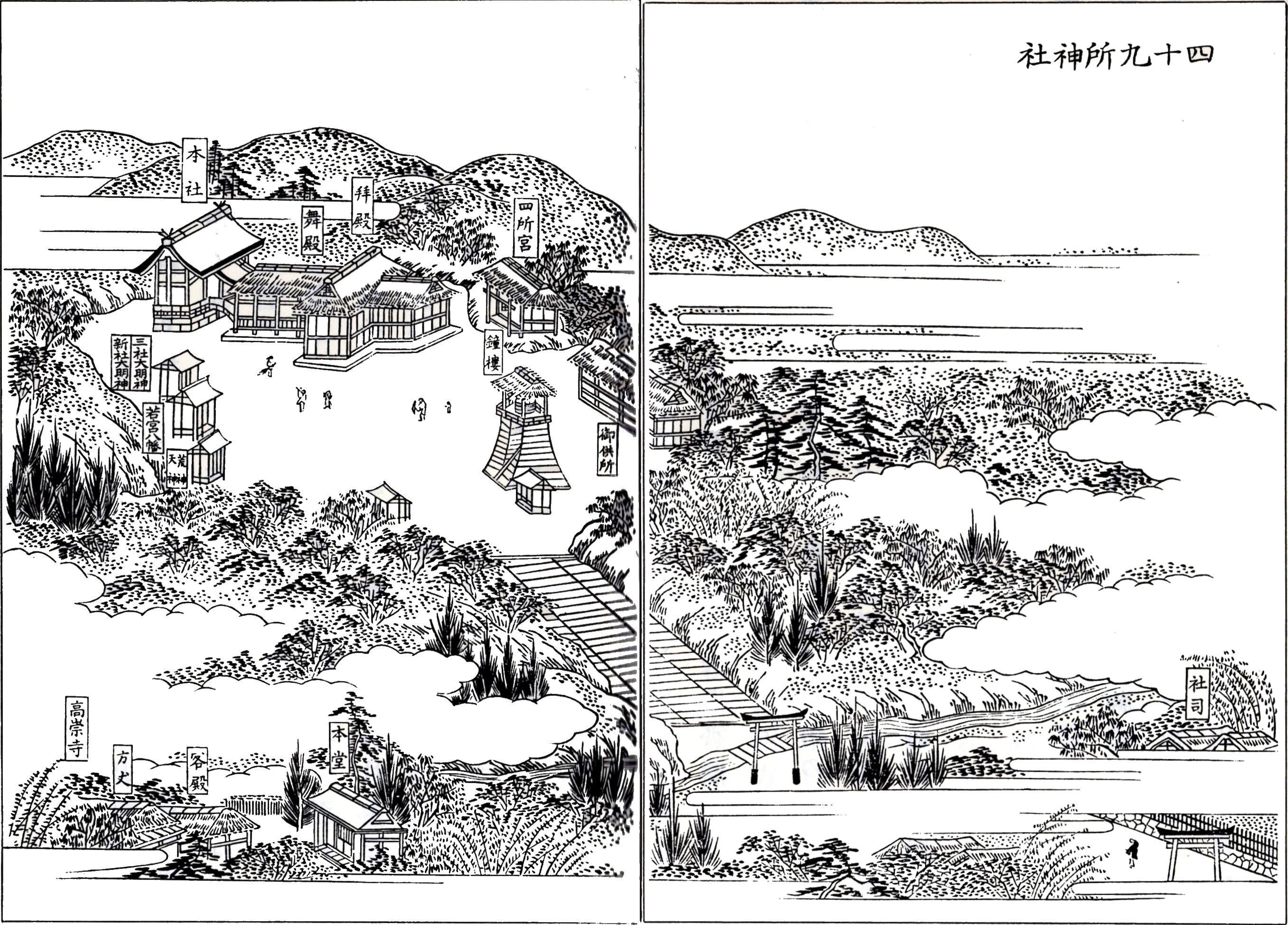
A drawing of a shrine from Sangoku Meisho Zue

=== Takaharu-cho, Miyazaki Prefecture ===
The town of Takaharu, with Takachiho Mountain rising behind it, has long been recognized as the place of Ninigi-no-Mikoto's descent. In the Sangoku Meisho Zue (三国名勝図会), a chronicle written by Satsuma Domain at the end of the Edo period, it is written that the name of this area, Takaharu (高原), is an abbreviation of Takamagahara (高天原) and the area was the capital of Japan during ancient times. The chronicle also states that it is the reason why there are other local areas with similar names such as Miyakojima (都島) and Takajo (高城).

As a proof of this record, Amano-Sakahoko (天逆鉾), the spear of gods, can be found at the top of the mountain. It is presumed that the spear was placed around the Edo period, but the details are still unknown. The town of Takaharu is also known as the birthplace of Emperor Jimmu. The main evidence is that Emperor Jimmu's infant name, "Sano-no-Mikoto", in the Nihon Shoki refers to the Sano area of the town. However, there is no detailed explanation about it, and the current description of Emperor Jimmu is largely based on Sangoku Meisho Zue (三国名勝図絵). According to the chronicle, Emperor Jimmu lived here until his expedition to the east.

=== Takachiho-cho, Miyazaki Prefecture ===
The town of Takachiho is located at the Northern part of Miyazaki prefecture. Ama-no-Iwato, Mount Amanokagu, and Shiioji Peaks can be found in this area. Takachiho Shrine is known for its specific type of Shinto ritual ceremonial dance called Yoru-Kagura, which is said to have originated from a dance performed by Ame-no-Uzume.

=== Soyo, Yamato-cho, Kumamoto Prefecture ===
Hinomiya-Heitate shrine, which calls itself the birthplace of the Takamagahara mythology, is at Soyo, Kumamoto. Shintai, the sacred body of the kami, is a stone slab carved with two types of Jindai characters, and the characters "Asohi-no-okami (アソヒノオオミカミ)" and "Hifumi (日文)" are engraved on the front and back of the slab. The shrine's name "Heitate" means Himorogi, a sacred place or an altar, and it is said that this is the sacred place where the gods descended in ancient times.

=== Takama, Gose-shi, Nara Prefecture ===
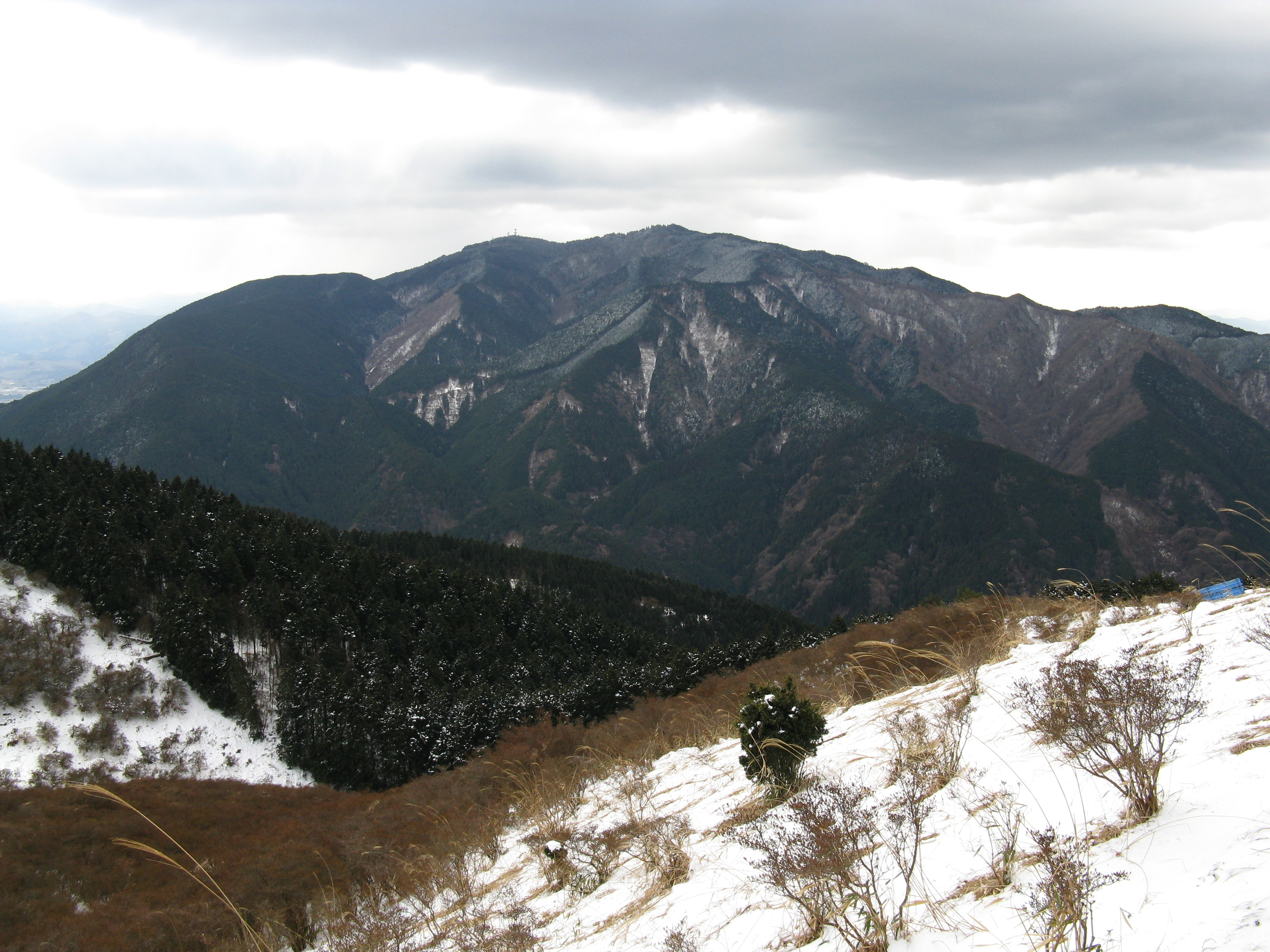
Mount Kongō viewed from Mount Yamato Katsuragi

Takama is located on a plateau at the foot of Mount Kongo in Gose-shi, Nara Prefecture. The region's old name is Katsuragi (葛城), and Mount Kongo was called Mount Takamagahara in ancient times. The Takamahiko Shrine is located at east side of Mount Kongo, and the area around the shrine is a traditional place where the gods of the heavens lived (Matsumura, 2014). The shrine is rated as the highest in the Engishiki (延喜式, Procedures of the Engi Era), and its shintai (神体, body of the kami) is a mountain located behind the shrine. Kagero Nikki (蜻蛉日記), a classical waka, indicates that Amano-iwato was at Mount Katsuragi. Since this poem was written around 974, it shows that this understanding dates back to at least the Heian period (794–1185). Similarly, Sanryu-syo (三流抄), the classical waka poem written in Kamakura period (1185–1333), describes the location of Takamagahara as Mount Katsuragi. Until the new Hitachi Province theory was proposed by Hakuseki Arai in the Edo period, this area was considered to be the location of Takamagahara. The stone monument of Takamagahara is in the parking lot of a temple in this area.

=== Iruzen, Maniwa City, Okayama Prefecture ===
Kayabe Shrine, Amano-Iwato, and Amano-Ukihashi are in the area of Hiruzen.

=== Oinuana, Ueno Village, Gunma Prefecture ===
The place was traditionally known as a small cave, but it was discovered to be much longer and deeper in 1929. The cave was named after what was believed to be the dwelling place of the Yamainu. Some places inside have been named as Takamagahara and Ama-no-Yasugawara.

=== Taga County, Ibaraki Prefecture ===
According to the theory proposed by Hakusei Arai, kanji in ancient times were representing pronunciation of the Japanese language, and the original meaning of the kanji does not match the meaning of the words they are describing. Therefore, the words expressed from them only explained pronunciation not the actual meanings. In Koshitsu (古史通), Hakuseki interpreted Takamagahara in hiragana instead of kanji and compared it to Taga Country in Hitachi Province. Also, he suggests that places called "Takaama-no-Ura” and "Takaama-no-Hara" in Hitachi Province originated from Takamagahara.

=== Iki, Nagasaki ===
The names of places such as "Amagahara (天ヶ原)" and "Takanohara (高野原)" still remain, and they are considered as "Heavenly Territory (天国領域)" according to the Kyushu-Yamatai-Koku theory.

== In South Korea ==
=== Goryeong County, North Gyeongsang Province ===
Location of Gyeongsangbuk-do in South Korea

The Korean Peninsula theory was sometimes advocated mainly by amateur Korean researchers after World War II. Initially, Chuncheon City at Gangwon-do was considered to be the location of Takamagahara in South Korea because of certain lyrics from Komagaku, a type of traditional Japanese court music.

However, in the 1990s, the chancellor of the Kaya University proposed a new theory called Goryeong County theory. He believes that the name of Mount Sori from Takamagahara mythology came from the capital city of South Korea, Seoul, and therefore Goryeong County is its correct location. In 1999, a stone monument of Takamagahara (고천원고지비) was raised in Kaya University.

== See also ==
- Ashihara no Nakatsukuni
- Mount Takamagahara
- Ne-no-Kuni
- Nirai Kanai
- Tian
- Yomi
