= Present life =

Religious term for the life being lived

Present life is a religious term meaning the current life someone is living in right now. It is distinct from the next life or past life in religions which believe in reincarnation or the Everlasting world in Shinto, or the afterlife in Abrahamic religions.

Many religions provide means to gain worldly benefits or benefits in the present life in addition to in other lives.

== Shinto ==
In Shinto, the word "present world" is historically read as "Utsushiro", meaning this world or the real world in which people live. In contrast, there is the land of God as the so-called heaven, paradise, and the land of Death or Yomi as the so-called hell, which is called Tokoyo Yomi as the land of the dead, or Yomi as the land of the dead.

In the Himorogi and Panza beliefs, which are said to be the beginning of Ko-Shintō, huge trees and stones in forests, mountains, and rocks are said to be Yorishiro of the gods, and at the same time, Iwakura means "border between the everlasting world and the present world". In Shrine Shinto as well, the Chinju no Mori and the broad-leaved evergreen trees planted in them represent the Shinto realm and at the same time are boundaries, which prevent the events of the everlasting world and the present world from coming and going easily. It is also a warding, which prevents the events of the everlasting world and the present world from coming and going easily.

=== Worldly benefits in Shinto ===
Since ancient times, people have prayed to the guardian deities of the local community, such as the Ujigami or Chinjujin, for rain, sun, insects, and disease, as part of the collective will of the community members of the village or other clans. Even today, this traditional culture has taken root in "festivals. Nowadays, in order to respond to the heartfelt wishes of individuals, Shinto priests and miko (priestesses and priestesses of Shinto shrines) perform a ritual prayer and Kagura-mai (dance performance) in front of the gods, and the prayers are obtained through the offering of a tamagushi (sacred skewer) by the person who prays. The types of personal wishes are classified into the following categories: disease remedies (for oneself and one's family), family safety, prosperous business, and relief from hardships in life.

In general, the position of worldly benefits in religion tends to be downplayed, but in Japan, they are recognized as inseparable from the other benefits of religion.

== Buddhism ==
The present life is one of the "Traiyadhvika" in Buddhism, past life, present life and next life. Apart from the temporal back and forth, Purification has the concept of "Impure Land and Pure Land". The word "Impure land" means "defiled world" and corresponds to the present world, and Pure land to the Everlasting world.

In the Vajra Prajnaparamita Sutra, it is written, "All saṅkhata dharma is like a dream and a shadow of a bubble," suggesting that the Buddhists understood this world as a dream and a bubble, something fleeting. Thus, Buddhism had a negative view of this world.

=== Worldly benefits in Buddhism ===
In Buddhism worldly benefits are said to be obtained by reading scriptures, chanting the Shingon mantra and Daimoku, praying, and building temples, pagodas, and Buddhist statues.

In Japan, after the arrival of Buddhism, a policy of gaining benefits from this world was adopted, such as the construction of Buddhist statues as a national policy, as in The Great Buddha of Nara. Then, in response to the people's desire to pray for benefits in order to recover when calamities struck and life failed, the Shingon and Tendai Esoteric Buddhism that flourished from the late antiquity to the Middle Ages were introduced, such as the Kajikito

By the time of the Kamakura Buddhism period, as in the Hōnen, " If one's illness is cured and one's life is prolonged by praying, then where would one die?"

== Christianity ==
In modern Protestantism, the emphasis on creation was thoroughly denied, which led to the denial of this life and the orientation toward the next life only, but eventually Akira Ikeda explained that, as modernization progressed, the emphasis on the next world was lost, and the focus shifted to the present world.

== Islam ==
In Islam, dunyā (Arabic: دُنْيا ) refers to the temporal world and its earthly concerns and possessions, as opposed to the hereafter (ʾākhirah). In the Qur'an, dunyā and ākhira are sometimes used dichotomously, other times complementarily. Islam does not a priori dismiss the world as "evil". Instead, this world is defined as "the field of ākhira" and the place of examination.

== In literature ==
Edogawa Ranpo is known to have often written on colored paper, "this world is a dream, and the dream of the night is the true thing".

== See also ==
- Dunya
- Yomotsu Hirasaka
- 現代 (disambiguation)

== Literature ==
- 小口偉一ほか『宗教学辞典』東京大学出版会 1973年
- 竹内整一 [in Japanese] (March 2007). 「はかなさ」と日本人 ["Transience" and Japanese]. 平凡社〈平凡社新書〉. ISBN 978-4-582-85364-3.
