= Ashihara no Nakatsukuni =

Japanese mythological place

Ashihara no Nakatsukuni (葦原の中つ国, transl. The middle country of reed beds) is, in Japanese mythology, the world between Takamagahara (Heaven) and Yomi (Hell). It was created by the god Susanoo-no-Mikoto, after he was driven out of Takamagahara by the gods for his violent actions.

In time, the term became another word for the country or the location of Japan. It is mentioned in both the Kojiki and the Nihon Shoki in the land-ceding myth about Ōnamuchi. The term can be used interchangeably with Toyoashihara no Nakatsukuni (豊葦原中国). There is a great dispute among historians about where exactly in Japan the term originally referred to.

Perhaps the term was considered appropriate to describe Japan because the land was damp and covered with reeds (葦) in ancient times. The meaning of 中 (middle) in the word 中つ国 is based upon the world view of ancient peoples, where 中つ国 indicates the real world or country between Takamagahara in the heavens and Yomi no kuni in the netherworld.

== See also ==
- Aaru – Paradise in ancient Egyptian mythology (lit. "Fields of Reeds"; Egyptian mythology equivalent to Ne-no-kuni/Yomi, the Shinto world(s) of the dead, but with a similar name-meaning to Ashihara no Nakatsukuni, lit. "Land of Reeds").
- Midgard – Location in Germanic cosmology (Norse mythology equivalent to Ashihara no Nakatsukuni, the world of the living).
- Upper world (Greek mythology) – Location in Greek mythology (Ancient Greek equivalent to Ashihara no Nakatsukuni, the world of the living).
