= Tokoyo no kuni =

Location in Shinto mythology

Tokoyo (常世), also known as Kakuriyo (隠り世、幽り世), or Taikaikan is a realm in Shinto. It is an "otherworld" though not necessarily seen as a place in the afterlife, but rather as a mythical realm with many interpretations. It is believed to be a place where various kami and spirits of ancestors live with eternal youth. Motoori Norinaga categorized three types of Tokoyo: a world of perpetual darkness, a world where people never grew old, and a world across the sea.

Ne-no-kuni is sometimes considered to be identical to Tokoyo no Kuni, or alternatively Yomi the underworld. There is no clear consensus on the relationship between these three realms.

Various stories related to Tokoyo can be found in classics such as Kojiki and Nihongi, including the tale of Tajimamori travelling to Tokoyo in the reign of Emperor Suinin to help him become immortal. In the reign of Empress Kogyoku a fanatical cult dedicated to the god of Tokoyo was said to have emerged.

== Myth of Okuninushi ==
In the Kojiki, Ōkuninushi used to rule the world, but he relinquished control during the Kuni-yuzuri to transfer control to the Amatsukami. He made a request that a magnificent palace – rooted in the earth and reaching up to heaven – be built in his honor, and then withdrew himself into the "less-than-one-hundred eighty-road-bendings" (百不足八十坰手 momotarazu yasokumade, i.e. the unseen world of the spirit) and disappeared from the physical realm.

The son of Amaterasu Ame no Hohi was sent to run Izumo Taisha for Susanoo when the transfer of land occurred as part of the agreement, and his descendants became the Izumo clan who run the shrine today.

== Identification with Mount Penglai ==
In the story of Urashima Tarō Tokoyo is identified with Mount Penglai. (Note: It is written as Horai (Mount Penglai) in the straight Chinese text, but it is also annotated to indicate it should be read as Tokoyo-no-kuni.)

The Asteroid 162173 Ryugu has two fossae named after each one.

== See also ==
- Bai sema
- Kunitsukami
- Shimenawa
- This world
- Yorishiro
