= Three Noble Children =

Figures in Japanese mythology

Three Noble Children (Japanese: 三貴子, Hepburn: Mihashira no Uzu no Miko) are three gods in Japanese mythology who were created when Izanagi, having returned from Yomi, washed away the filth of the other world. They are also called Sankishi or Sankishin (三貴神).

- Amaterasu – created from Izanagi's left eye. Goddess of the sun who controls the day.
- Tsukuyomi – created from Izanagi's right eye. God of the moon who controls the night.
- Susanoo – created from Izanagi's nose. God of the sea who controls the tides.
