= Izumo-taishakyo =

Japanese Shinto grouping

Izumo Taishakyo or Izumo Oyashirokyo
- 出雲大社教
- Izumo-taishakyo Crest

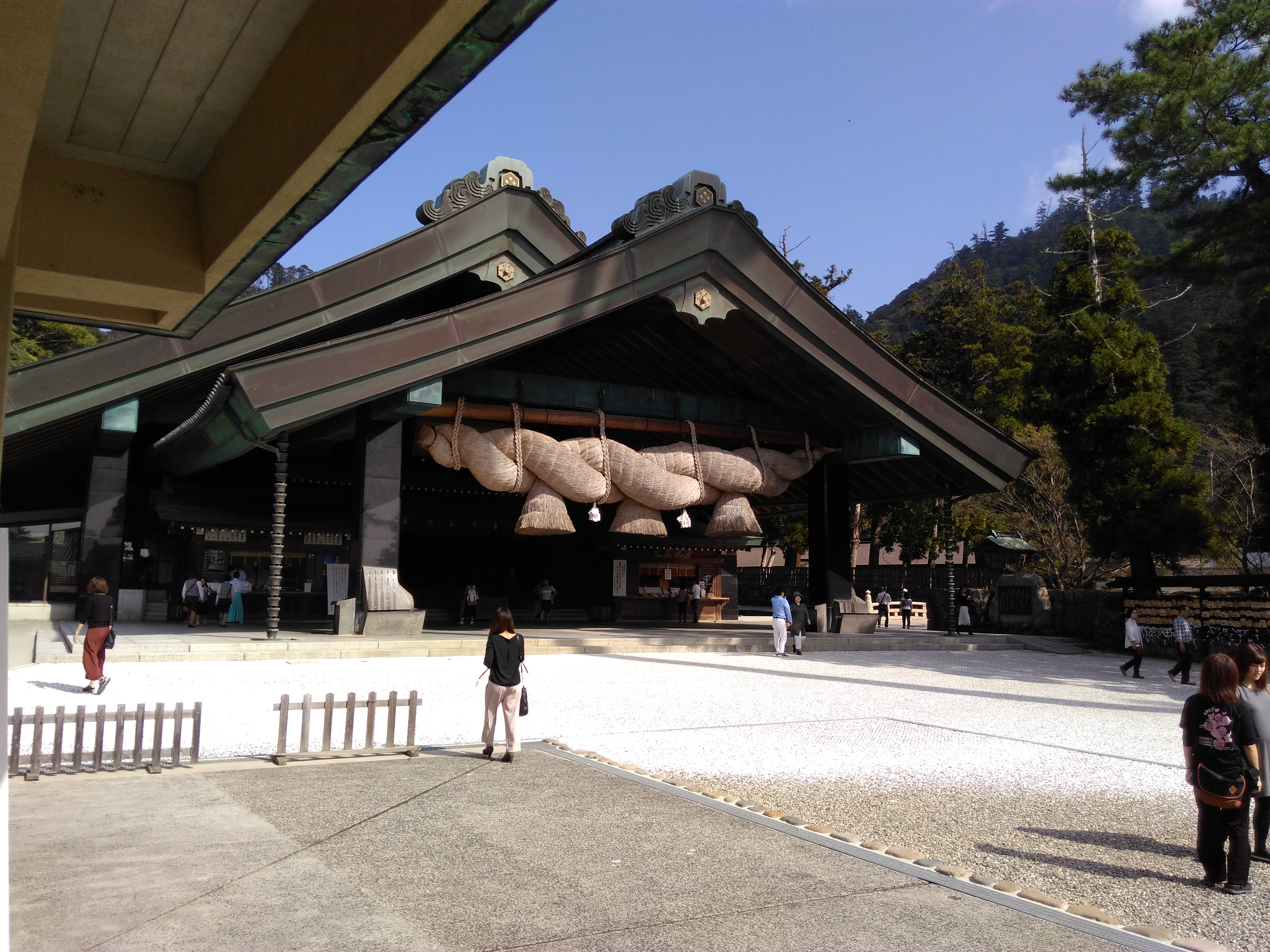
- Izumo Taisha Kagura Hall photographed from Izumo Taisha Academic Affairs Headquarters, the headquarters of Izumo Taisha
- Founder: Senge Takatomi
- Type: Religious Organization
- Headquarters: Izumo-taisha, Shimane Prefecture, Japan
- Official language: Japanese
- Parent organization: Kyoha Shintō Rengokai
- Website: http://www.izumooyashirokyo.or.jp

Izumo-taishakyo (出雲大社教, Izumo taishakyō; in Japanese Izumo Ooyashirokyō) is a Japanese Shinto grouping. It was established by Senge Takatomi (1845–1918), the 80th head priest of Izumo-taisha in 1882, as one of the original thirteen sects of Kyoha Shintō Rengokai (Association of Sectarian Shinto), during the Meiji era in Shimane Prefecture.

== Overview ==
There is a headquarters (Cultural Affairs Office) on the precincts of Izumo Taisha in Shimane Prefecture and Izumo City, and the staff of Izumo Taisha is also the staff of Izumo-taishakyo. However, while Izumo-taisha itself is affiliated with Jinja Honcho, legally speaking, Izumo-taishakyo is an independent religious corporation separate from Jinja Honcho and associated with Kyoha Shintō Rengokai. Thus Izumo-taishakyo walks a middle ground between Shrine Shinto and Sect Shinto.

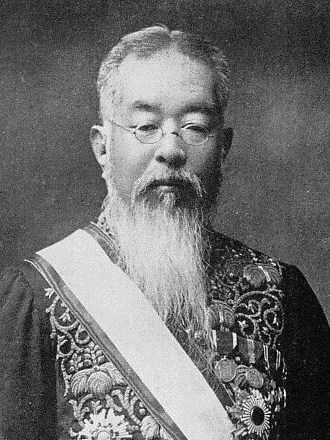
Senge Takatomi, the founder of Izumo-taishakyo

During the Meiji Period, priests from Izumo Taisha were collected to participate in the creation of a centralized State Shinto. However, due to conflicts primarily with the traditions of Ise-jingu, the Izumo tradition was separated into its own sect. In 1872, Amaterasu, Takamimusubi, Kamimusubi, and Amenominakanushi were decided to be the four main Kami for the national religion, but the Izumo faction argued that Okuninushi should also be worshiped, which led to a great debate with the Ise faction. However, the Ise faction gained the support of Emperor Meiji, and the Izumo faction was defeated and Okuninushi was not enshrined. In addition, the "separatist religion decrees" issued by the Meiji government made it so that it was forbidden to carry out the Izumo religion independently of the state. For that reason, Senge Takatomi, the head priest of Izumo-taisha at the time, resigned from Izumo Taisha Omiya and founded Izumo-taishakyo. Izumo-taishakyo was integrated with Izumo-taisha in 1951, but Izumo-taishakyo and Izumo-taisha remain as separate entities.

Under the Allied occupation after World War II, Shinto was separated from the government control and Izumo-taisha was reformed into a private shrine, then Senge and its Izumo-taisha-kyo took back the position of the administrator of Izumo-taisha. Takatoshi Senge (千家尊祀), the 83rd-generation Izumo no Kuni no Miyatsuko of Senge lineage, was chosen to be the chief priest of Izumo-taisha in 1947. He died in February 2002 at the age of 89.

The predecessor of Izumo-taishakyo was "Izumo Taisha Keijin-ko", which was established in 1873 by Senge Takatomi, to centralize Izumo-ko (an organization that uses Izumo-taisha as a religion shrine) throughout the country. Propagation institutions are set up all over Japan, especially in the west, centered on the Chugoku region. Churches (教会) exist throughout Japan as well, however, they are not officially affiliated with Izumo-taisha itself, and are merely described as "missionary organizations for the Izumo Taisha religion," so they are not referred to as "shrines" or "branches", and thus are not "shrines" that is an inclusive religious corporation of the central government office, nor is a "branch" that is an inclusive religion corporation of the religious corporation Izumo Taishakyo. "Izumo-taisha Okinawa", which was established in Okinawa during the U.S. occupation, did not receive the name "church" at the time. In addition, there are lay organizations nationwide associated with Izumo-taishakyo known as "Ko".

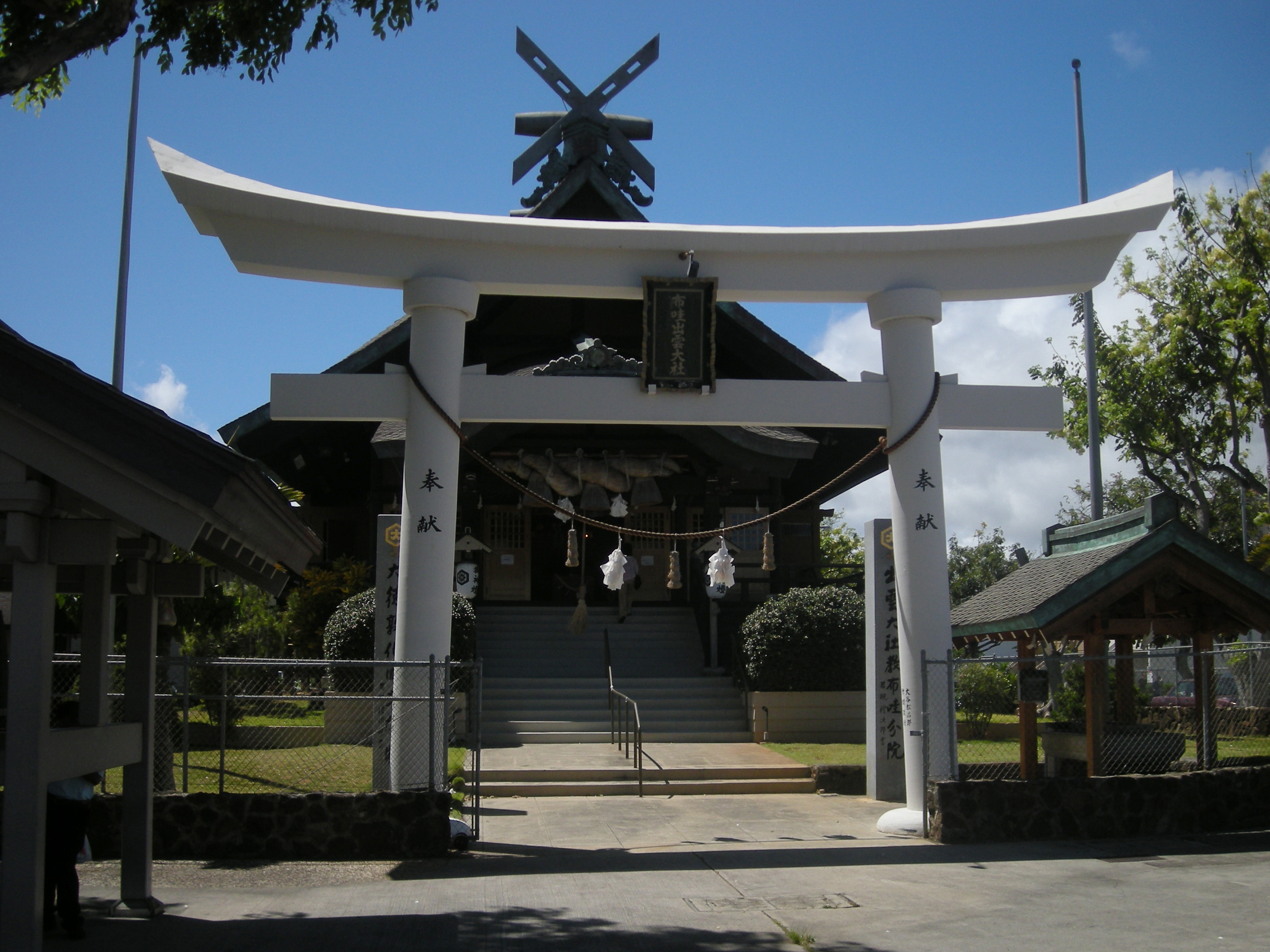
Izumo Taishakyo Mission of Hawaii, Honolulu, Hawaii

Outside of Japan, Hawaii Izumo Taisha in Honolulu was founded in 1906 when Rev. Katsuyoshi Miyao opened a temporary worship site on Aala Street near Aala Park on 26 September 1906. A temporary shrine building was completed on 25 August 1907. A permanent shrine building was completed in 1922. By 1941, there were branches of Izumo Taishakyo operating in Hilo, Wailuku, Waipahu, Pearl City, Honouliuli, Ewa Lower Camp, Aiea, and Kakaako.

As of 2014, the Senge family of the Izumo clan had been the heads of the shrine for the last six generations since Senge Takatomi.

Hitachi Izumo-taisha Shrine (formerly Izumo-taisha Hitachi Church) was a branch of Izumo Taisha Shrine located in Ibaraki Prefecture, however it has been a separate entity since 2013.

== Beliefs and doctrine ==
Izumo-taishakyo holds Okuninushi as the head kami of the faith, as well as holding Ame no Hohi as an important kami, who is believed to be the ancestor of the Izumo clan from whom the founder of the faith, Senge Takatomi, as well as all heads of Izumo-taisha, are descended.

Okuninushi is understood as the kami of "En-musubi" (lit. The Tying of Bonds) and is considered to preside over all human relationships, such as friendship, marriage, and professional relationships. He is considered by many worshipers of Izumo-taishakyo to be the predominant Kami in Japanese mythology.

In addition, there is the doctrine of Yuken Ichinyo (幽顕一如, Unity of the Obscured and the Visible worlds) in which it is believed that "the visible world and the invisible world, life and death are two sides of the same coin", and that humans do not come into existence upon birth, nor cease to exist upon death, but that there is a degree of reincarnation where humans inherit a spirit from their ancestors. A person alternates between the physical world and the spiritual world. The Spirit World (幽世 kakuriyo) is the domain of Okuninushi, which he was granted domain over after he relinquished control of his physical kingdom to the Amatsukami.

Unlike the typical practice of Shrine Shinto, but in line with the practice of Konkokyo, a fellow Sect Shinto faith, during prayers, worshipers bow twice deeply with hands placed around the knees, then clap four times, instead of the more typical two, to gain the attention of the kami. This has been explained as being that the worshipper does not draw attention only to the themselves, but to future partners, such as a future spouse, when praying at Izumo-taisha.

== See also ==
- Izumo Taishakyo Mission of Hawaii
- Izumo-taisha
