= Sankogan =

Pharmacy producer in Gose, Nara

- Native name: 株式会社 三光丸
- Industry: Pharmacy
- Founded: 1319; 707 years ago
- Headquarters: 700-1 Imazumi, Gose, Nara Prefecture, Japan
- Key people: Komeda Toyotaka (CEO)
- Website: www.sankogan.co.jp/en

Sankogan is the oldest Japanese pharmacy producer with continuous run founded in 1319. It is located in Gose city, Nara Prefecture, Japan. The products were made using herbal medicine plants green gentian, licorice, philodendron bark, cinnamon, etc.

== History ==
- Sankogan formation in 1319 dates back to Kamakura period and the legend says the founder chosen the company name from Emperor Go-Daigo.
- During 1818 - 1829 started the product sale in China.
- In Keiō era (1866) invited were representatives from Kaga Province and Toyama Prefecture for cooperation.
- From 2012 the company operates with the name Sankogan Co., Ltd.

== See also ==
- List of oldest companies
