= Tajimamori =

Japanese legendary figure of Kofun period

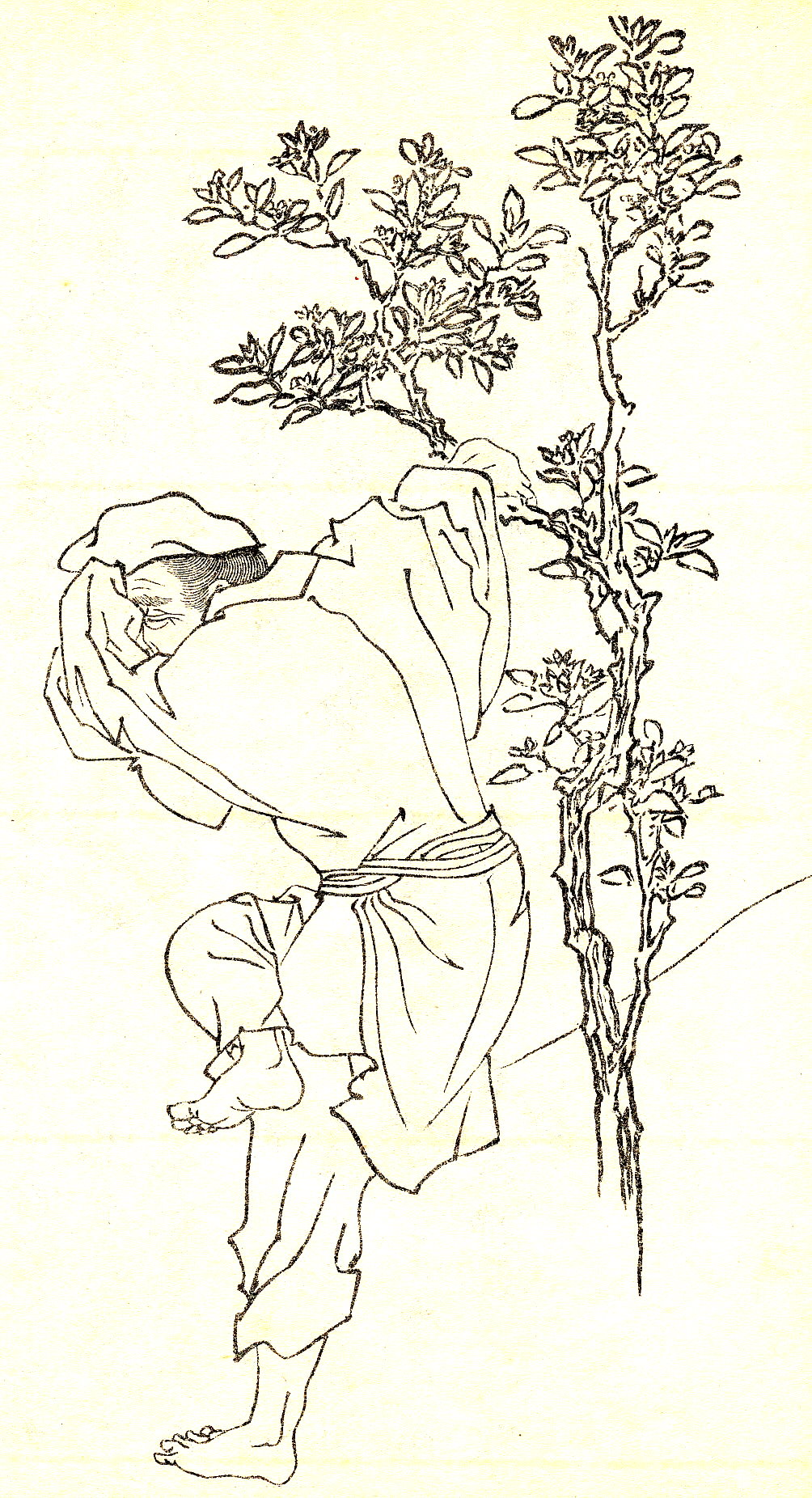
Illustration by Kikuchi Yōsai, from Zenken Kojitsu

Tajimamori (田道間守) is a Japanese legendary figure of the Kofun period, also worshipped as the god of sweets. His name is written in kanji as 多遅麻毛理 in the Kojiki, and as 田道間守 in the Nihon Shoki.

== Legendary narrative ==
Tajimamori's ancestry is described differently in the Kojiki and Nihon Shoki. The Kojiki lists him as the son of Tajimahinaraki (多遅摩比那良岐) and elder brother of Tajimakiyohiko (多遅麻清日子), while the Nihon Shoki records him as the son of Tajimahinaraki (但馬日楢杵)'s son Tajimakiyohiko (但馬清彦).

Emperor Suinin commanded Tajimamori to go and get him a magical fruit called tokijiku no kagu no konomi (非時香菓). To this end Tajimamori crossed to the magical land of Tokoyo no kuni (常世の国), and after ten years he returned with some branches with leaves and some with fruit. However, by this time Emperor Suinin was already dead. Tajimamori gave half of his branches to Suinin's widow and offered the other half at the deceased emperor's tomb, then died himself, wailing with sadness.

He also laments and recites a speech after learning of the Emperor's death.

== Worship ==
The fruit Tajimamori brought back is supposed in the records to be a tachibana. Tajimamori's role as god of sweets also originates in this story: the last character in the name of the fruit simply meant "fruit" at the time, but now refers to "sweets".

Tajimamori is enshrined as the god of sweets in Nakashima Shrine in Hyōgo Prefecture, and through bunrei at various other shrines throughout the nation. He is worshiped primarily by those involved in the confectionery industry.

Imari City in Saga Prefecture is traditionally considered the place where Tajimamori landed back in Japan, and Imari Shrine also worships him. The original site of Kitsumoto Shrine in Kainan City, Wakayama Prefecture is said to be the spot where the branches Tajimamori brought back were first transplanted.

== In popular culture ==
Tajimamori is a character in Rin: Daughters of Mnemosyne and is voiced by Masahiko Tanaka.
