= 現代 =

現代 or 现代 is an East Asian word which means modern times, modern, or present (time)

- See Xiandai (disambiguation) (Xiàndài), for the Chinese/pinyin transliteration

現代 or 现代 may also refer to:

== Companies ==
- Hyundai (現代), a former South Korean industrial conglomerate ("chaebol"). Many of the divisions have since been divested, and the remaining undivested part is known as Hyundai Group
- Hyundai Motor Company (現代自動車), a division of Hyundai Motor Group
- HD Hyundai Heavy Industries (HD現代重工業), a division of HD Hyundai Group
- Hyundai Asan (現代峨山), a division of Hyundai Group
- Hyundai Engineering and Construction (現代建設), a division of Hyundai Motor Group
- Hyundai Department Store (現代百貨店), a department store chain in South Korea

== Other uses ==
- Close-up Gendai (クローズアップ現代), a TV show on NHK in Japan
- Modern Education (現代教育), a cram school in Hong Kong
- Gendai budō (現代武道), the modern Japanese martial arts
- Shukan Gendai (週刊現代), a weekly magazine published by Kodansha in Japan
  - Gendai (現代), Nikkan Gendai (日刊現代), and Gekkan Gendai (月刊現代), sister magazines of the above published by Kodansha

== See also ==
- Hyundai (disambiguation)
