= Katsuragisan Ropeway =

Aerial tramway line in Gose, Nara, Japan

- 葛城山ロープウェイ
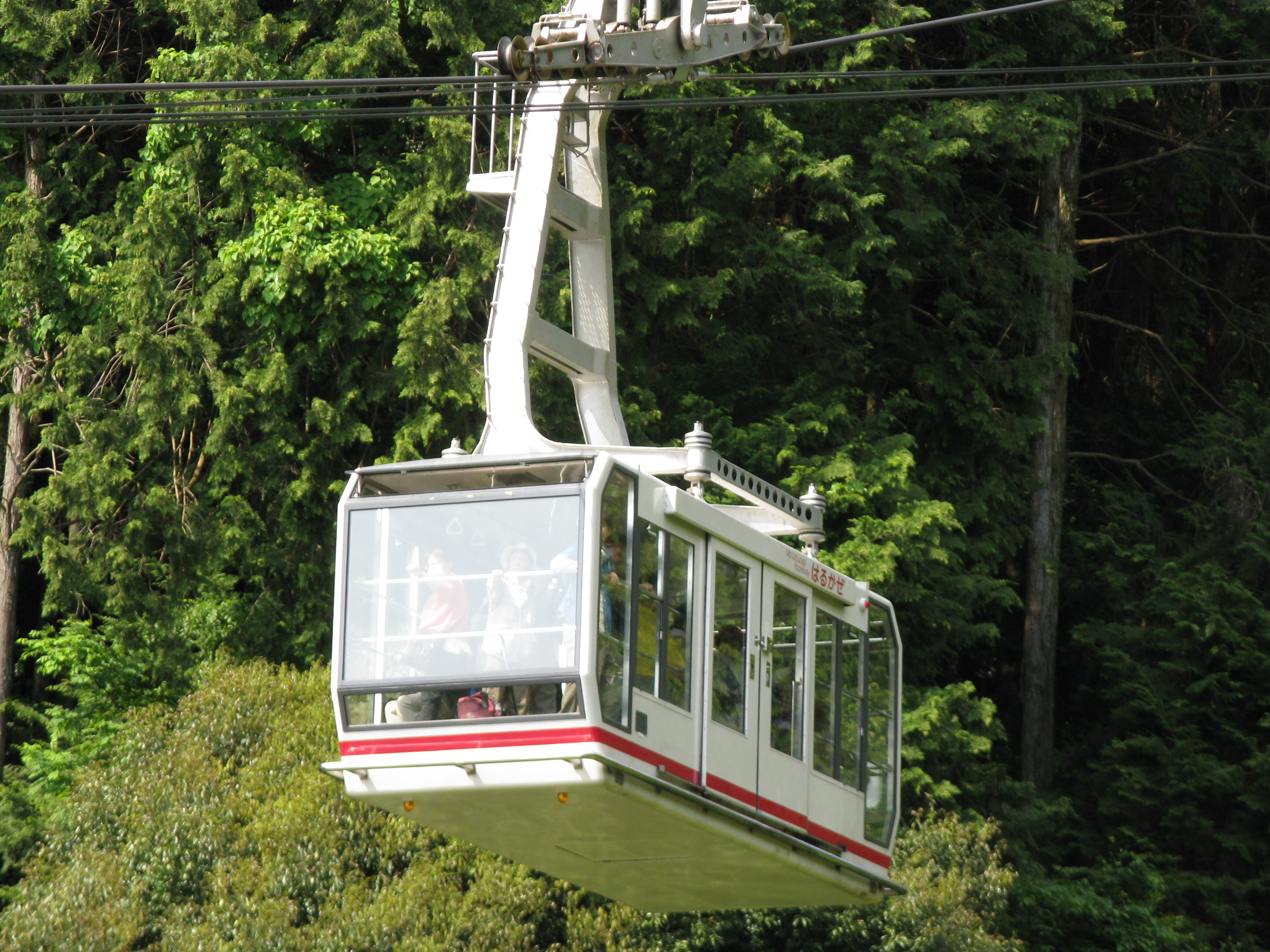
- Katsuragisan Ropeway
- Interactive map of Katsuragisan Ropeway

Overview
- Other name: Katsuragi Ropeway Line (葛城索道線)
- Status: Operational
- Character: Recreational
- System: Kintetsu Railway
- Location: Nara, Nara
- Country: Japan
- Coordinates: 34°27′30.4″N 135°41′13.3″E
- Termini: Katsuragi-Tozanguchi; Katsuragi-Sanjo
- No. of stations: 2
- Built by: Kinki Nippon Railway
- Open: March 26, 1967; 59 years ago

Operation
- Owner: Kintetsu Railway
- Operator: Kintetsu Railway
- No. of carriers: 2 cabins
- Carrier capacity: 51
- Operating times: 9:10 – 17:06
- Trips daily: Weekdays: 32; Weekends and holidays: 40
- Trip duration: 6 min.
- Fare: One-way: ¥740 (Minor: ¥370); Round-trip: ¥1,250 (Minor: ¥630)

Technical features
- Aerial lift type: Aerial tramway
- Manufactured by: Kinki Sharyo
- Line length: 1.421 km (0.9 mi)
- No. of cables: 3
- Installed power: 440 V AC

The Katsuragisan Ropeway (葛城山ロープウェイ, Katsuragisan rōpuwei), legally referred to as Katsuragi Ropeway Line (葛城索道線, Katsuragi sakudō sen), is an aerial tramway line in Gose, Nara, Japan. The line is the only aerial tramway line in Japan that is directly owned and operated by a major private railway company, the Kintetsu Railway. Opened in 1967, the line climbs Mount Yamato Katsuragi. Contactless smart cards PiTaPa or Surutto Kansai are not available on the line.

== Basic data ==
- System: Aerial tramway, 3 cables
- Cable length: 1.4 kilometres (0.9 mi)
- Vertical interval: 561 m (1,841 ft)
- Maximum gradient: 30°48′
- Operational speed: 5.0 m/s
- Passenger capacity per a cabin: 51
- Cabins: 2
- Stations: 2
- Time required for single ride: 5 minutes

== See also ==
- List of aerial lifts in Japan
