= Senge Takatomi =

Japanese politician and religious leader

Baron Senge Takatomi
- 千家 尊福
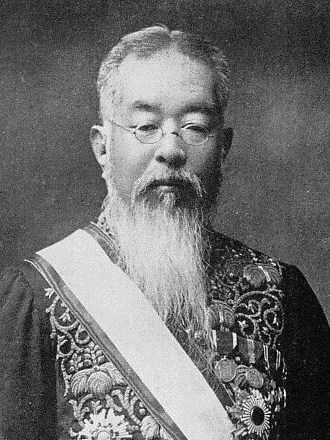

Minister of Justice
- In office 25 March 1908 – 14 July 1908
- Prime Minister: Saionji Kinmochi
- Preceded by: Matsuda Masahisa
- Succeeded by: Okabe Nagamoto

Member of the House of Peers
- In office 10 July 1890 – 3 January 1918 Elected by the Barons

Member of the Genrōin
- In office 7 June 1888 – 20 October 1890
Gubernatorial offices
Governor of Tokyo
In office 12 November 1898 – 25 March 1908
Monarch	Meiji
Preceded by	Koizuka Ryū
Succeeded by	Hiroshi Abe
Governor of Shizuoka Prefecture
In office 7 April 1897 – 16 July 1898
Monarch	Meiji
Preceded by	Komatsubara Eitarō
Succeeded by	Katō Heishirō
Governor of Saitama Prefecture
In office 20 January 1894 – 7 April 1897
Monarch	Meiji
Preceded by	Ginbayashi Tsunao
Succeeded by	Tadashi Munakata

Personal details
- Born: 7 September 1845 Izumo Province, Japan
- Died: 3 January 1918 (aged 72)
- Children: Senge Motomaro

Baron Takatomi Senge (千家 尊福; 7 September 1845 – 3 January 1918) was a Japanese priest and politician. He served as governor of three prefectures. He was Governor of Saitama from 1894 to 1897, Governor of Shizuoka from 1897 to 1898, and Governor of Tokyo from 1898 to 1908. He was also a member of the House of Peers.

He was an organizer of the 1907 Tokyo Industrial Exhibition.

He was a Shinto Priest and the founder of Izumo-taishakyo, and the 80th high priest of Izumo-taisha (an eightieth generation descendant of the first Izumo no Kuni no Miyatsuko).

He founded the Mokuyōkai (木曜会, The Thursday Association) a Japanese political faction dedicated to representing the interests of barons over higher nobility.

== Ancestry ==
The descendants of Amenohohi-no-mikoto (天穂日命), the second son of Amaterasu-ōmikami (天照大御神), the sun goddess whose first son is the ancestor of the imperial family, have been, in the name of Izumo Kokuso (出雲国造) or governor of Izumo, taking over rituals because when Izumo-taisha was founded Amenohohi-no-mikoto rendered service to Okuninushi-no-kami. The family's conflict around 1340 made them separated into two lineages, Senge (千家) and Kitajima (北島).

In 1871, Izumo-taisha was designated as an Imperial-associated shrine and the government sent a new administrator so Izumo kokuso families were no more the administrators of Izumo-taisha. So Senge's father was exiled and Takatomi Senge never managed to be high priest of the shrine.

Senge reorganized the traditions of Izumo Taisha under the organization Izumo-taishakyo and was instrumental in the development of Sect Shinto.

It was only in 1947 under the Allied Occupation of Japan that the Senge family managed to become high priests of Izumo Taisha again. Takatoshi Senge (千家尊祀), the 83rd-generation Izumo no Kuni no Miyatsuko of Senge lineage, was chosen to be the chief priest of Izumo-taisha in 1947. He died in February 2002 at the age of 89.

== Political offices ==
Senge held many political offices in his life. He was a member of Japan's House of Peers, a group of nobles who were like the British House of Lords. He was also the Governor of Saitama Prefecture from 1894 to 1897, the Governor of Shizuoka Prefecture from 1897 to 1898, the Governor of Tokyo from 1898 to 1908 and the Minister of Justice in 1908.

== See also ==
- Izumo no Kuni no Miyatsuko
- State Shinto
- Izumo-taisha
- Izumo-taishakyo
- Sect Shinto
- Noriko Senge

Political offices
Preceded by Matsuda Masahisa	(Japan) Chairman of the Legal commission 1908	Succeeded by Okabe Nakamoto
Business positions
Preceded by Gengaku Mutaguchi	President of Tokyo Toden; 1909–1911	Succeeded by Abolished
Other offices
Preceded by Position established	Head of Izumo-taishakyo; 1882–1888	Succeeded by Senge Sonai (千家尊愛)
Preceded by Takazumi Senge (千家尊澄)	Head Priest of Izumo Taisha; 1872–1882	Succeeded by Senge Takaki (千家尊紀)
Preceded by Takazumi Senge (千家尊澄)	80th Izumo no kuni no Miyatsuko; 1872–1882	Succeeded by Senge Takaki (千家尊紀)
Japanese royalty
Preceded by Position established	Baron; 1884–1918	Succeeded by Senge Takamuni (千家尊統)
