= Xiandai =

Xiàndài (现代) is a term meaning modern or Modern Era in Mandarin Chinese. It is often used in one of the following contexts:

- Xiàndài Hànyǔ Chángyòng Zìbiǎo (现代汉语常用字表), "List of Frequently Used Characters in Modern Chinese" published by the People's Republic of China
- Xiandai wenxue (現代文學), "Modern Literature", Taiwan-based literary journal.

== See also ==
- Modern (disambiguation)
