= Ne-no-kuni =

Netherworld in Japanese mythology

Ne-no-kuni (根の国; lit. "Land of roots; Land of origin") or Soko-tsu-ne-no-kuni (底根之國; lit. "Distant land of roots") in the Nihon Shoki, also called Ne-no-kata-su-kuni (根之堅洲國; lit. "Borderland of roots") or Haha-no-kuni (妣國; lit. "Land of my late mother") in the Kojiki, refers to a netherworld in Japanese mythology. It is sometimes considered to be identical to Yomi, another netherworld in the myths as well as Tokoyo no kuni (常世国; lit. "Eternal land"). There is no clear consensus on the relationship between these three realms.

The god Susanoo is described as the ruler of Ne-no-kuni. There are differing accounts on how he assumed this position:

According to the Kojiki when Izanagi tasked his children with the rule over the various realms: Amaterasu got the "Plain of the High Heaven" (Takamagahara), Tsukuyomi got the "Dominion of the Night" (Yoru-no-wosu-kuni), and Susanoo got the "Sea Plain" (海原, Una-bara). Susanoo ignored this command and kept crying over the loss of his dead mother Izanami, such that his weeping led to death and destruction. As Susanoo wished, Izanagi expelled him to be near his mother in Ne-no-kata-su-kuni. In the previous episodes about Izanami's death this land is called Yomi.

The Nihon Shoki mentions Ne-no-kuni in passing when describing an episode where Susanoo was banished from Takama-ga-hara for various evil acts he committed, and went to a place called (Soko-tsu-)Ne-no-kuni.

According to the Kojiki when Ōkuninushi visited Ne-no-kuni and insulted Susanoo he was submitted to overcome three ordeals, one being described to sleep in a house infested with snakes, centipedes and wasps. This is sometimes taken as another hint that Ne-no-kuni is a subterranean realm. One explanation of the myth contrasts the trials of Ōkuninushi to a symbolic death through rites of initiation that cause one to become reborn into a new life. In this story, death does not pollute; it regenerates. The land of the dead also contains the forces of life, tama.

The Michiae no matsuri (道饗祭) norito is an ancient Shinto prayer asking the gods to prevent the evil beings from Ne-no-kuni-Soko-no-kuni (根國底國) to do any harm. The Minatsuki no tsugomori no ōharae (no norito) (六月晦大祓[祝詞]), also short Ōharae no kotoba (大祓詞), which is performed in the great purification (harae) ceremony of the sixth month locates Ne-no-kuni-Soko-no-kuni in the "Great Sea Plain" (大海原, Ō-una-bara), i.e. the ocean.

Kunio Yanagita compared Ne no Kuni to the Nirai Kanai of the Ryukyuan religion. This paradisical land is situated beyond the seas.
