= Gose, Nara =

Gose 御所市
- City
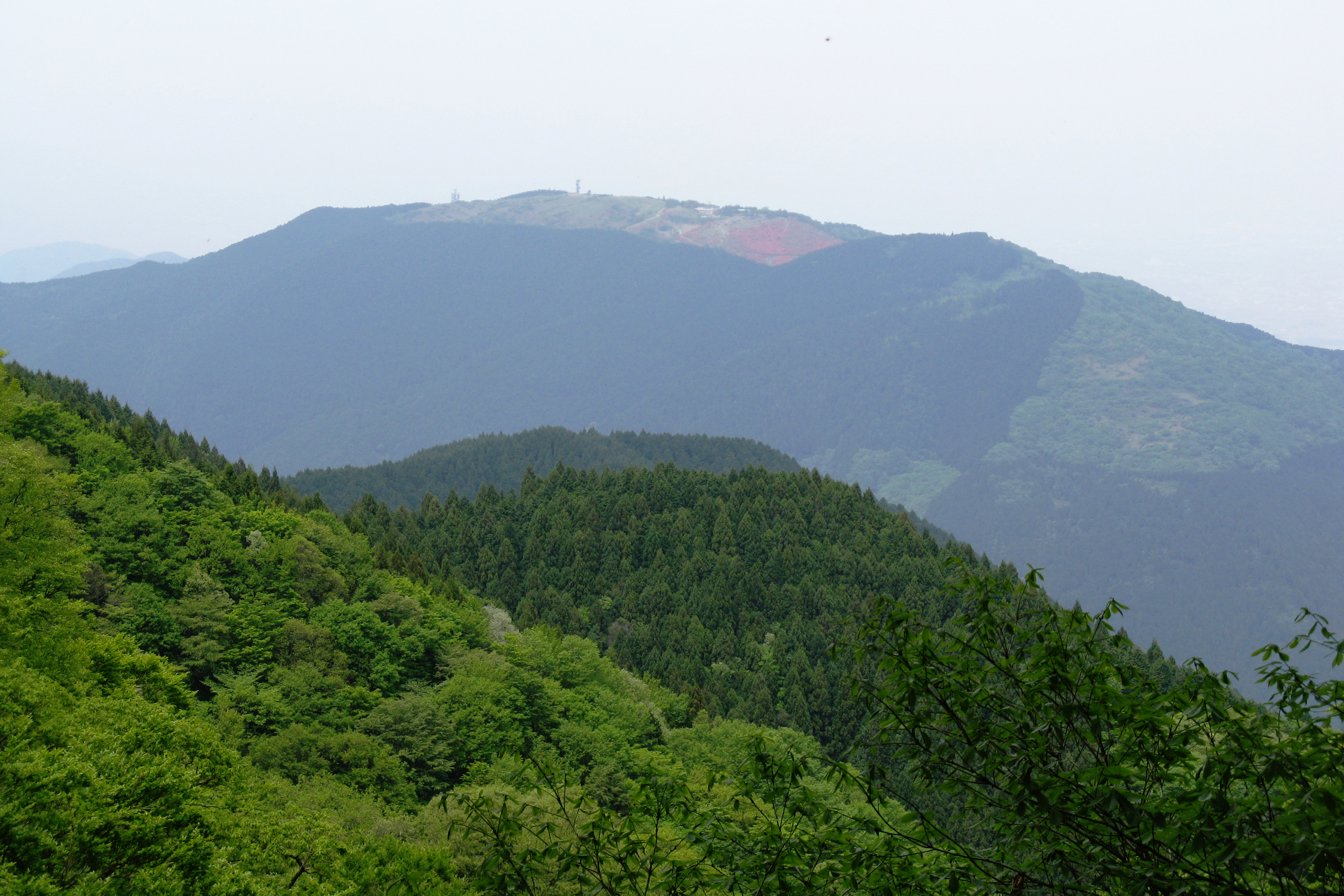

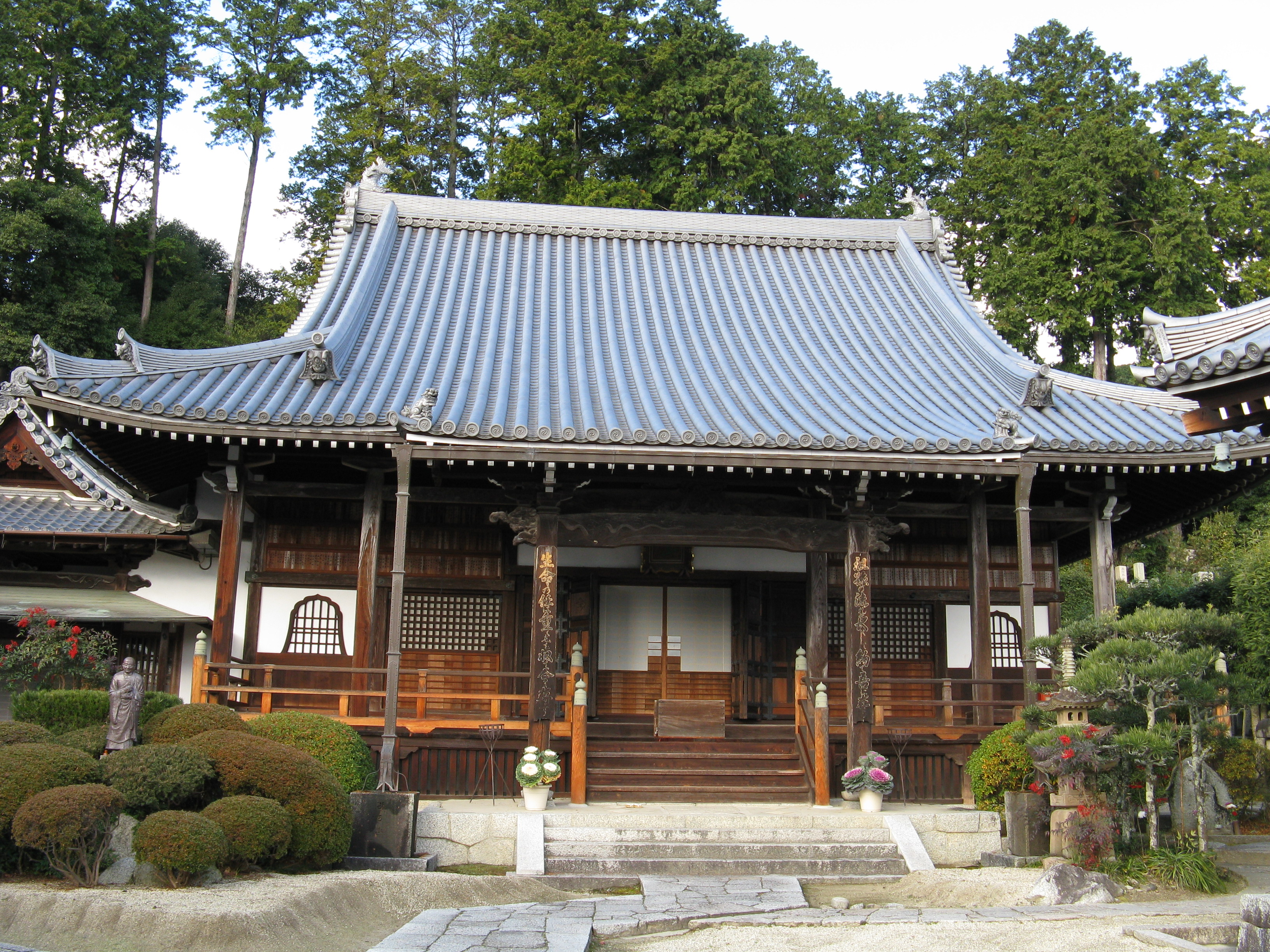

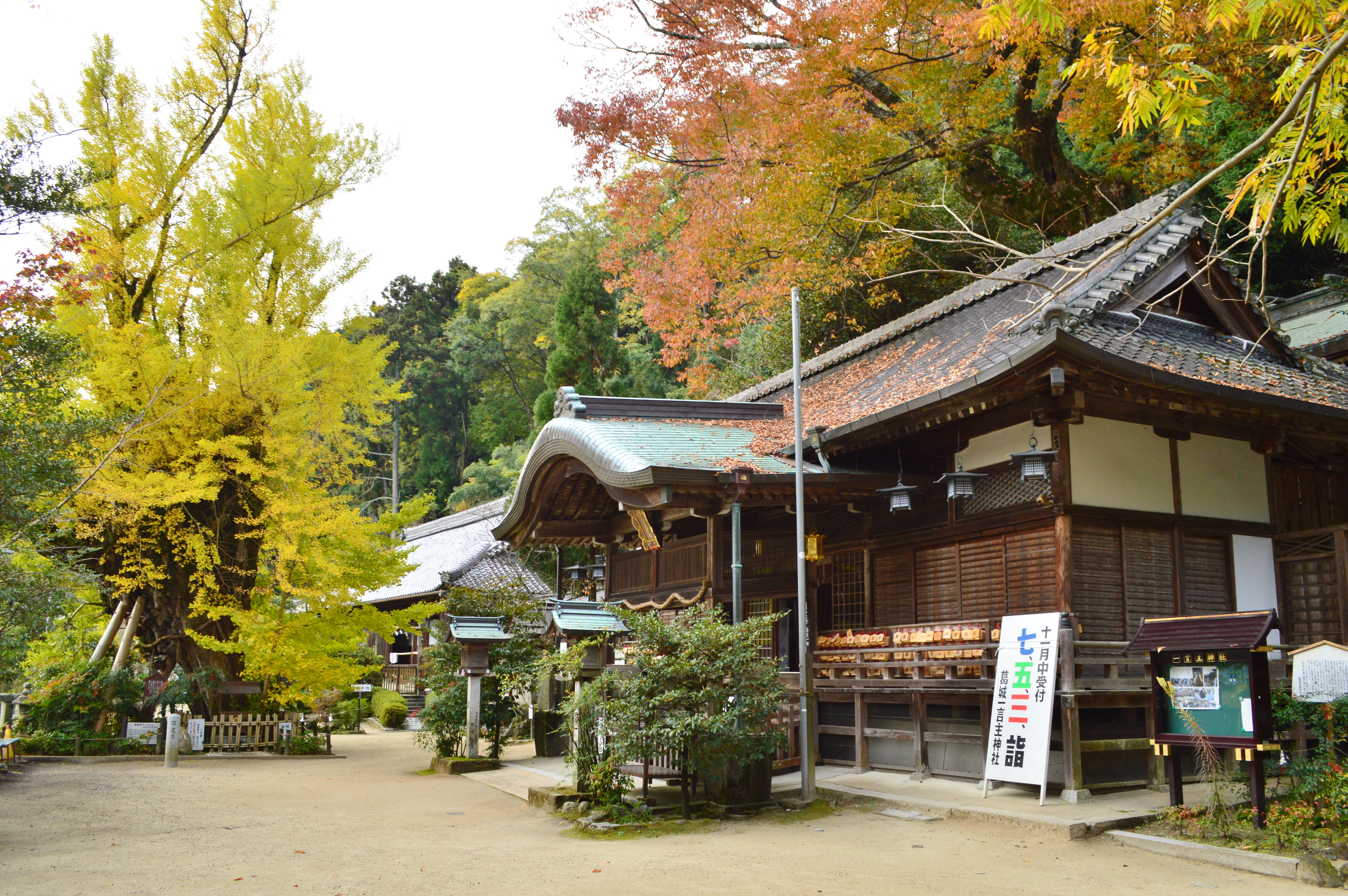

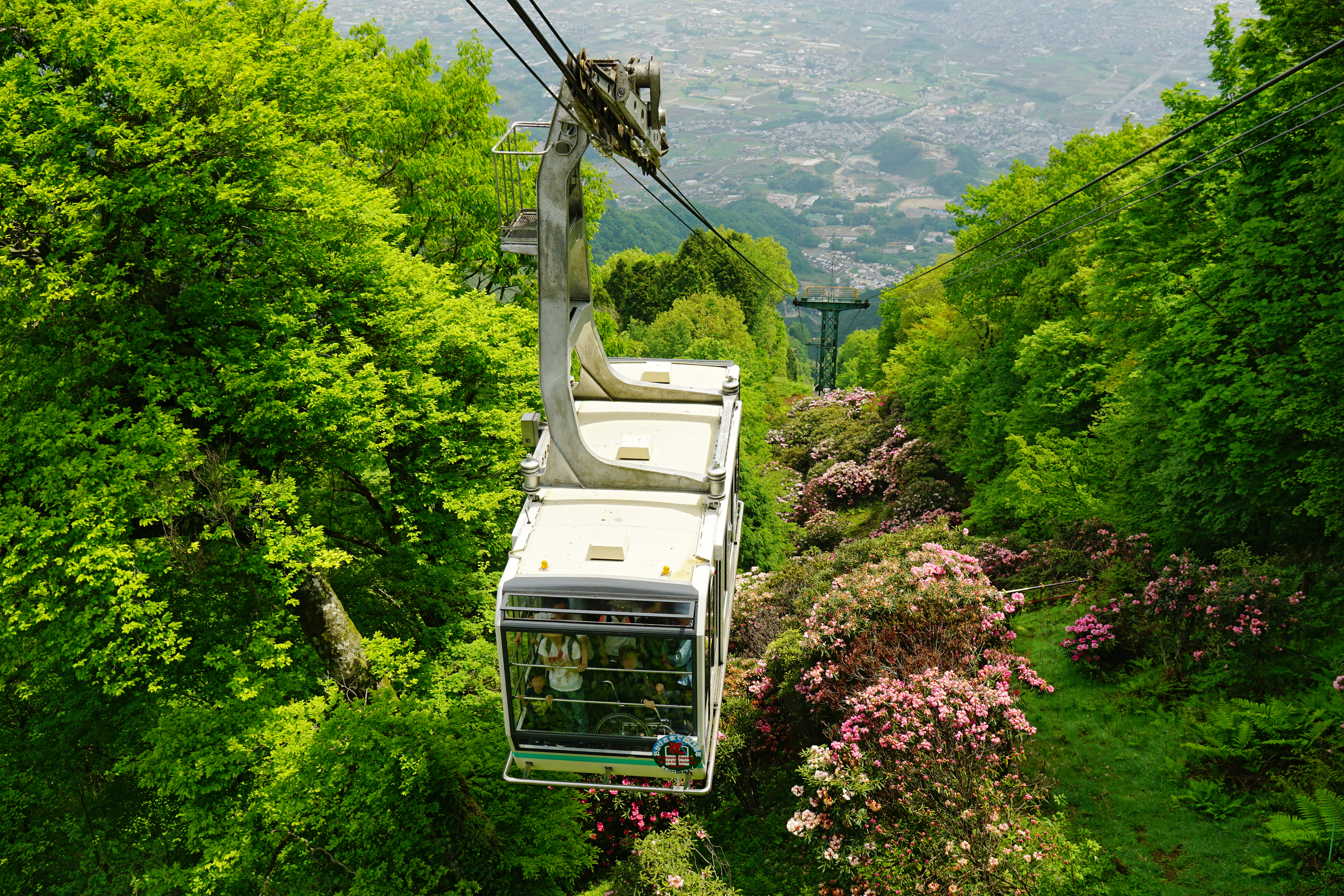

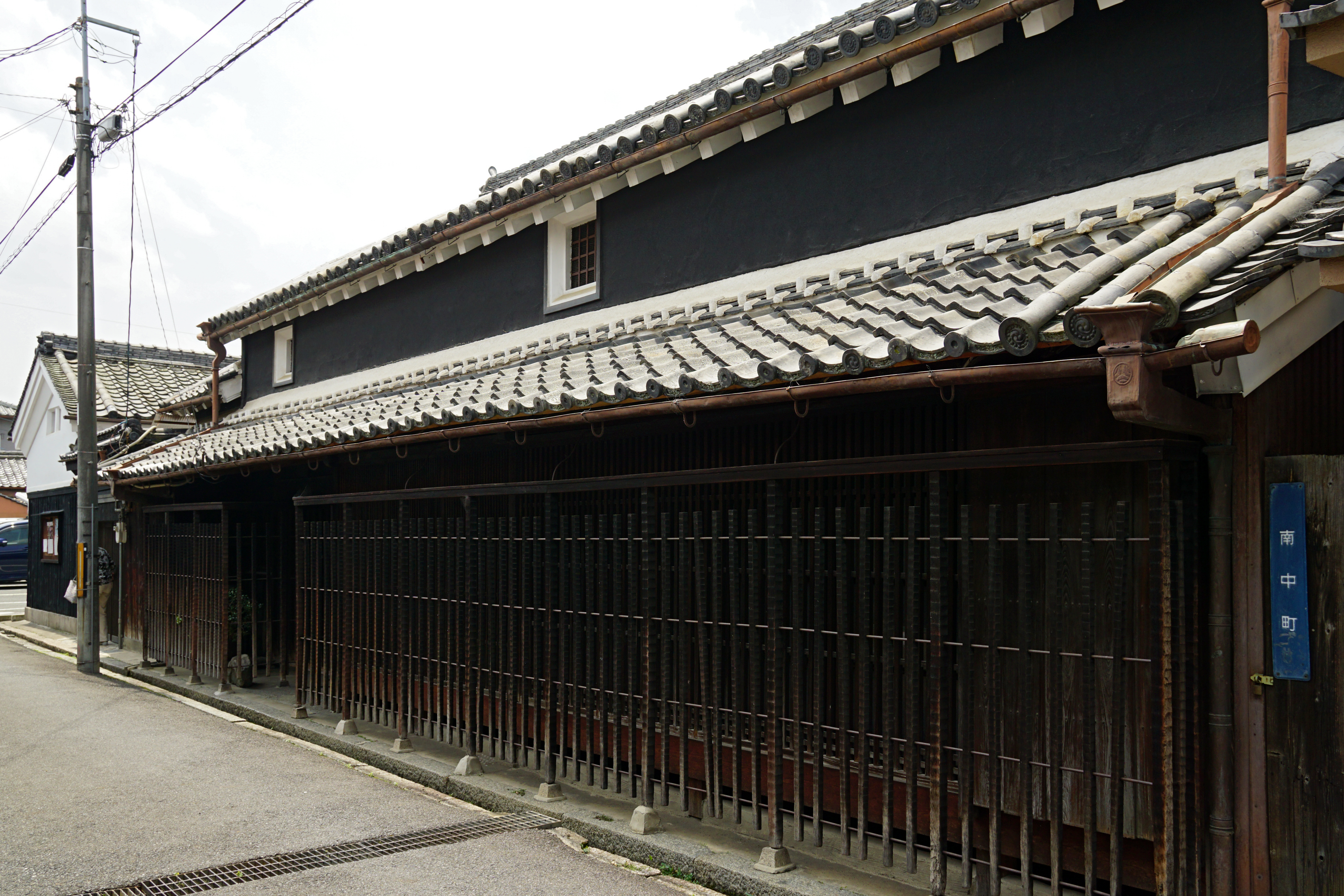
Mount Yamato Katsuragi
Kuhon-ji]	Katsuragi Hitokotomeshi JInja
Katsuragisan Ropeway	Nakai residence
市庁舎位置
- Flag Emblem
- Interactive map of Gose
- Location in Japan
- Coordinates: 34°27′48″N 135°44′25″E
- Country: Japan
- Region: Kansai
- Prefecture: Nara

Government
  - Mayor: Shuji Yamada (since October 2024)

Area
  - Total: 60.58 km^{2} (23.39 sq mi)

Population (December 9, 2024)
  - Total: 23,196
  - Density: 382.9/km^{2} (991.7/sq mi)
- Time zone: UTC+09:00 (JST)
- City hall address: 1-3 Gose-shi, Nara-ken 639-2298
- Website: Official website
- Symbols
- Flower: Azalea
- Tree: Camphor laurel

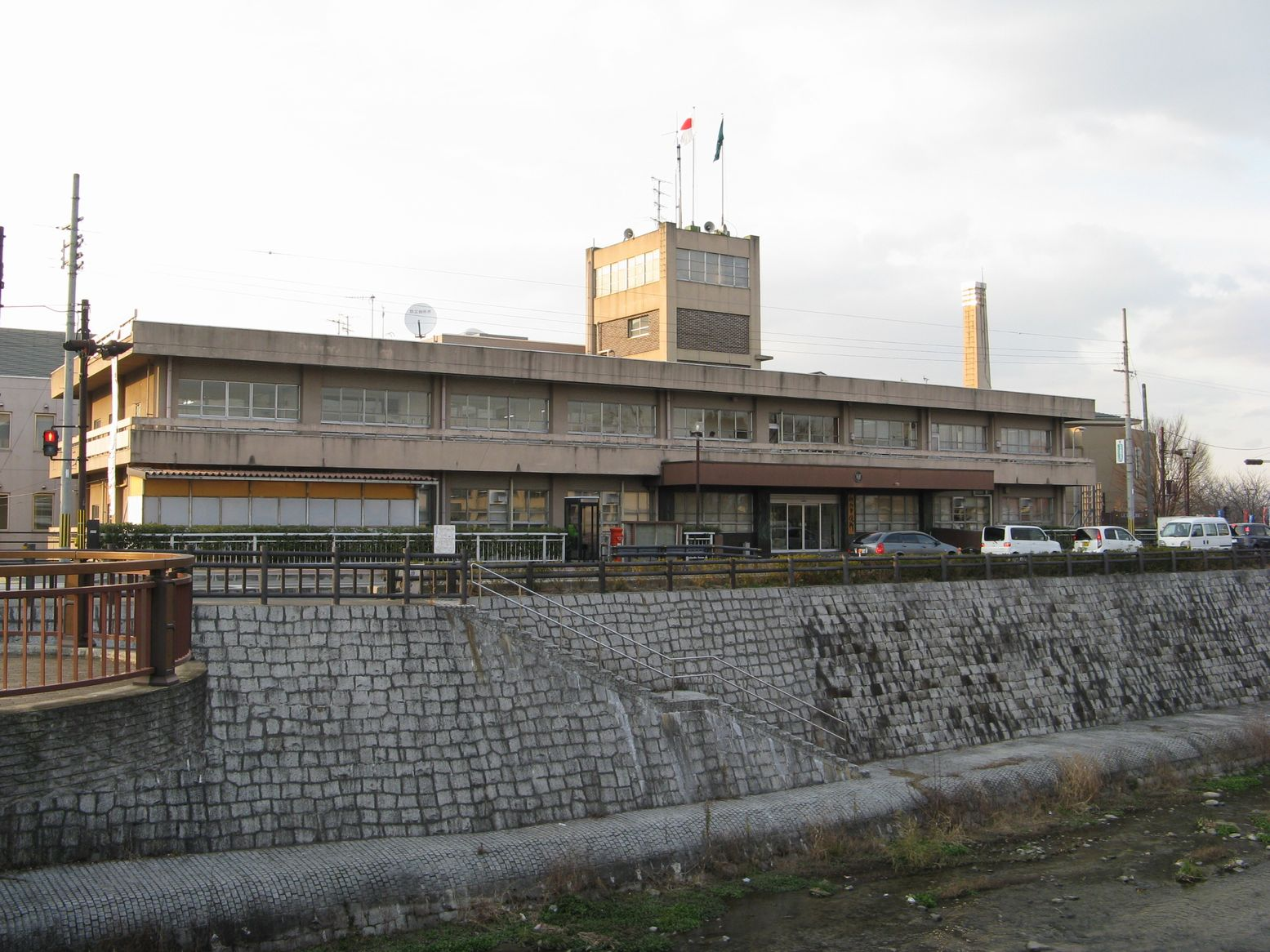
Gose City Hall

Gose (御所市, Gose-shi) is a city located in Nara Prefecture, Japan. As of 9 December 2024, the city had an estimated population of 23,196 in 11958 households, and a population density of 380 persons per km^{2}. The total area of the city is 60.58 km^{2} (23.39 sq mi).

== Geography ==
Gose is located at the eastern foot of the mountain range that stretches from Mount Katsuragi to Mount Kongō, bordered by Osaka Prefecture to the west. It is at the southwestern edge of the Nara Basin.

=== Neighboring municipalities ===
Nara Prefecture

- Gojō
- Kashihara
- Katsuragi
- Ōyodo
- Takatori
- Yamatotakada

Osaka Prefecture

- Chihayaakasaka

=== Climate ===
Gose has a humid subtropical climate (Köppen Cfa) characterized by warm summers and cool winters with light to no snowfall. The average annual temperature in Gose is 14.2 °C. The average annual rainfall is 1636 mm with September as the wettest month. The temperatures are highest on average in August, at around 26.4 °C, and lowest in January, at around 2.7 °C.

=== Demographics ===
Per Japanese census data, the population of Gose is as shown below

Historical population
Year	Pop.	±%
1960	35,549	—
1970	35,987	+1.2%
1980	37,387	+3.9%
1990	36,644	−2.0%
2000	34,676	−5.4%
2010	30,287	−12.7%
2020	24,096	−20.4%

== History ==
The area of Gose was part of ancient Yamato Province. During the Kofun period into the Nara period, the area was the stronghold of the powerful Katsuragi clan, and many burial mounds and ancient Shinto shrines can be found within the town limits. The town of Gose was established with the creation of the modern municipalities system on April 1, 1889. Gose merged with the villages of Katsura, Katsurakami, and Taishoon March 31, 1958 and was raised to city status.

== Government ==
Gose has a mayor-council form of government with a directly elected mayor and a unicameral city council of 13 members. Gose contributes one member to the Nara Prefectural Assembly. In terms of national politics, the city is part of the Nara 3rd district of the lower house of the Diet of Japan.

== Economy ==
Gose is a regional commercial center, with light manufacturing and agriculture. It also serves as a commuter town for Osaka Prefecture and the neighboring city of Yamatotakada.

== Education ==
Gose has six public elementary schools and four public junior high schools and one combined elementary/junior high school operated by the city government and two public high schools operated by the Nara Prefectural Board of Education.

== Transportation ==
=== Railways ===
JR West - Wakayama Line

T Gose - Tamade - Wakigami - Yoshinoguchi

Kintetsu Railway - Gose Line

Kintetsu Gose

Kintetsu Railway - Yoshino Line

Kuzu - Yoshinoguchi

Kintetsu Railway - Katsuragisan Ropeway

Katsuragitozanguchi - Katsuragisanjyō

=== Highways ===
- Keinawa Expressway
- National Route 24
- National Route 168
- National Route 309
- National Route 168

== Local attractions ==
- Gose-machi town
- Kamotsuwa Shrine
- Kamoyamaguchi Shrine
- Katsuragi Hitokotonushi Shrine
- Takakamo Shrine
- Sankogan, herbal medicine producer founded in 1319
- Mount Yamato-Katsuragi (959.2 m)
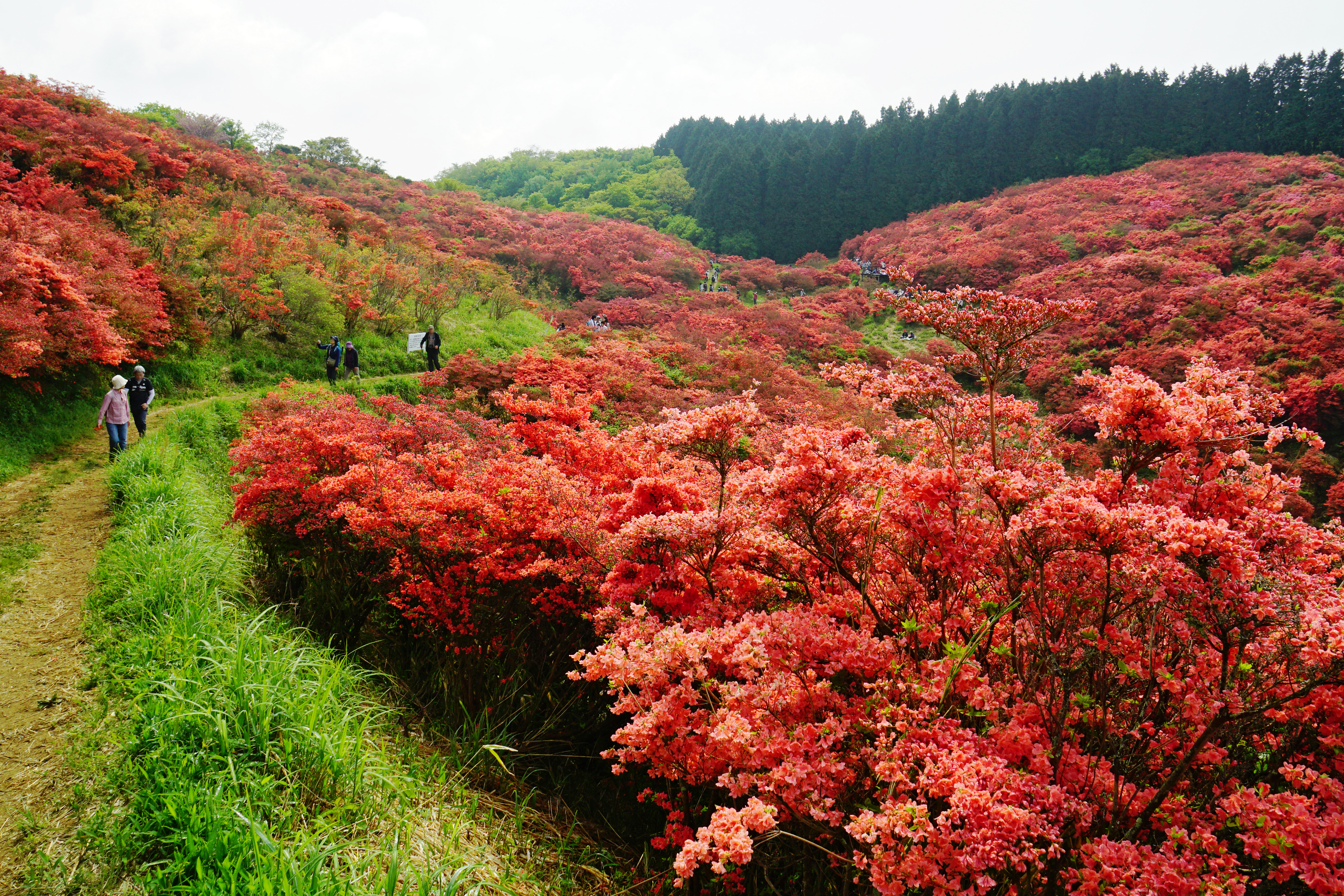
Rhododendron Nature Garden in Mount Yamato Katsuragi

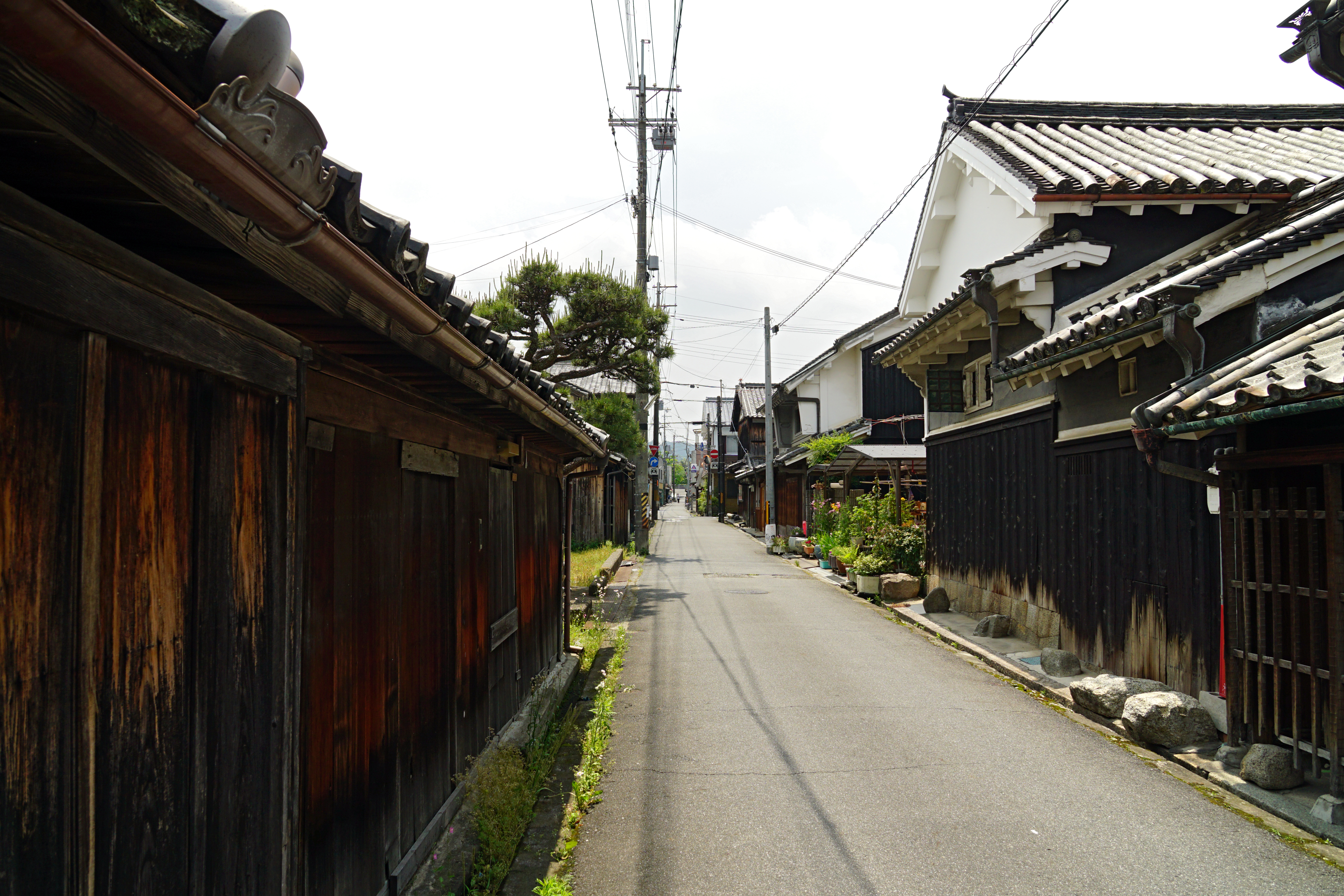
Gose-machi town
