= Mount Yamato Katsuragi =

Mountain in Japan

- 大和葛城山; Yamato Katsuragi-san
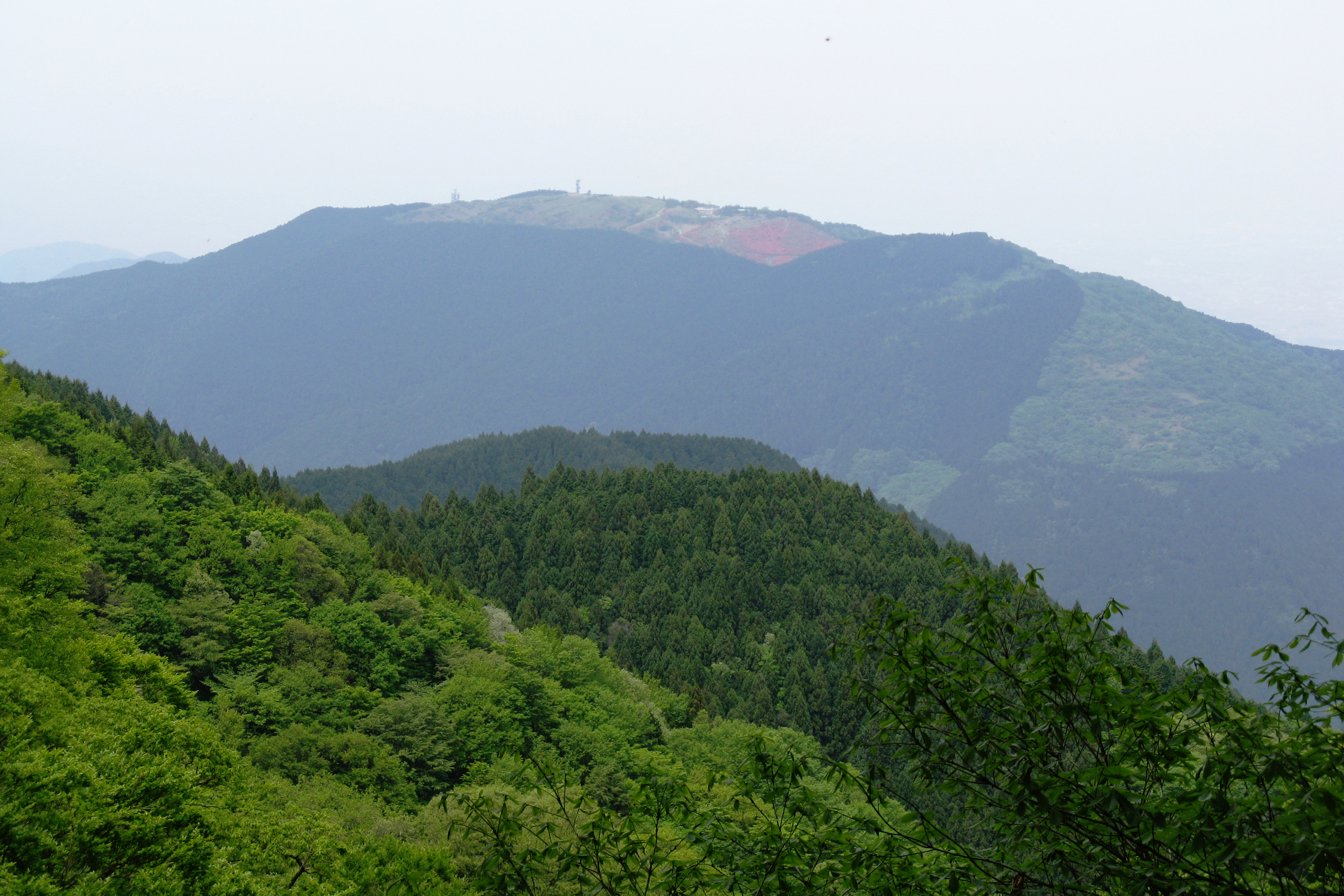
- Mount Yamato Katsuragi from Mount Kongō on the road below Katsuragi Shrine (March 2010).

Highest point
- Elevation: 959.2 m (3,147 ft)
- Listing: Mountains of Japan
- Coordinates: 34°27′22″N 135°40′56″E

Naming
- English translation: Yamato Kudzu Castle Mountain
- Language of name: Japanese

Geography
- Location within Japan
- Location: Mount Yamato Katsuragi is located between Chihayaakasaka and Gose, Japan
- Parent range: Kongō Range

Mount Yamato Katsuragi (大和葛城山, Yamato Katsuragi-san) or simply Mount Katsuragi is a mountain in the Kongō Range straddling the prefectural border of Chihayaakasaka, Osaka and Gose, Nara in Japan. The peak elevation is 959.2 metres (3,147 ft). The mountain is located along the Gose Line of the Kintetsu Railway.

The base of the mountain has many different Shinto shrines and Buddhist temples. The mountain is accessible via the Katsuragisan Ropeway on the east side, as well as several different hiking trails of varying difficulty and length on all sides. The summit has a local government-run lodge and campground for those who want to spend the night or rest after ascending Mount Yamato Katsuragi.

Other names for the mountain include Mount Kaina, Mount Kamo, Mount Tenshin, and Shinoga Peak.

== Location and naming ==
Mount Yamato Katsuragi is located within Kongō-Ikoma-Kisen Quasi-National Park, with a peak elevation of 959.2 metres (3,147 ft). Mount Nijō is about 8.6 kilometres (5.3 mi) to the north, and Mount Kongō is about 5.6 kilometres (3.5 mi) to the south-southwest. It is part of the Kongō Range. Mount Yamato Katsuragi has gently sloping sides which rise from the neighboring Katsuragi Plateau. The mountain was produced by orogenic folding, and is composed of schistose granite overlaid with a shallow layer of sandy and gravelly alluvial soil.

The Kongō Range was formerly known as the Katsuragi Range (葛城山脈, Katsuragi Sanmyaku) before being renamed to its current title. Mount Yamato Katsuragi has a number of different historical names: Mount Kaina (戒那山, Kaina-san), Mount Tenshin (天神山, Tenshin-san), and Mount Kamo (鴨山, Kamoyama) were all used in ancient Yamato Province. It was known as Shinoga Peak (篠峰, Shinogamine) in ancient Kawachi Province.

== Access and amenities ==
On the east side of the mountain, the Katsuragisan Ropeway is an aerial tramway which transports visitors between Tozanguchi Station (登山口駅, Tozanguchi Eki) at the base of the mountain and Katsuragi Sanjō Station (葛城山上駅, Katsuragi Sanjō Eki) near the top of Mount Yamato Katsuragi. The ropeway is operated by Kintetsu Railway. A one-way trip lasts about 5 minutes and covers 1.4 kilometres (0.87 mi).

Tozanguchi Station is accessed by taking a bus from stop three in front of Kintetsu Gose Station (which is directly across the street from JR's Gose Station). The ride to Tozanguchi Station is between 15 and 20 minutes.

A number of hiking trails are accessible from all sides of Mount Yamato Katsuragi. The Kujira Waterfall Trail (櫛羅の滝コース, Kujira no Taki Kōsu) weaves under the ropeway as it goes up the mountain, taking about 70–80 minutes for the ascent. The Kitaone Trail (北尾根コース, Kitaone Kōsu) follows a northwest path before curving back toward the southwest. It takes about 2 hours to ascend the mountain via this trail. The hike passes fields of rhododendrons (コバノミツバツツジ, kobano mitsuba tsutsuji) as well as wood of Japanese beech trees near the end of the trail.

Starting the hike at Mount Yashiki Park (屋敷山公園, Yashiki-yama Kōen) in nearby Katsuragi, the trail goes west for about 3 kilometres (1.9 mi) before meeting up with the main Diamond Trail, where the trail turn south for another 4 kilometres (2.5 mi). This trail takes around 3.5 hours to hike. There are the same fields of rhododendrons about 30 minutes from the summit along this trail.

On the Osaka side of the mountain, there are four different trails to choose from. One starts at the Kano bus stop near Shiraki Elementary School in Kanan, which takes about 4 hours to hike. Hiking the trail starting at the Kauchi bus stop near Kauchi Elementary takes about just over 3 hours. Starting on the south at the entrance to the Mizukoshi Tunnel (on Route 309) gives two different trails (one going east and the other going west), and the hiking time is about the same for each route. The east route goes by Tsutsujien, a park full of rhododendrons just south of the lodge.

Katsuragi Kogen Lodge (葛城高原ロッジ, Katsuragi Kōgen Rojji), operated by the local government, offers overnight lodging and food for up to 70 people in 17 different rooms. The lodge includes a gift shop carrying local specialty foods, and has traditional ofuro bathing. It is located about 300 metres (980 ft) south of the summit along the hiking trail. The lodge also operates a campground just to the northeast of the summit along the north trail.

== Environs ==
The city of Katsuragi maintains two city parks near the base of the mountain. Katsuragi Sanroku Park (葛城山麓公園, Katsuragi Sanroku Kōen) is just northeast of the base of the mountain. Mount Yashiki Park is 1.2 kilometres (0.75 mi) northeast of Katsuragi Sanroku Park. Both parks offer good views of Mount Yamato Katsuragi as well as other mountains in the area.

There are a number of Shinto shrines and Buddhist temples near Mount Yamato Katsuragi. They are listed alphabetically.

- Anrakuji (安楽寺)
- Hōmanji (法満寺)
- Kamoyamaguchi Shrine (鴨山口神社, Kamoyamaguchi Jinja)
- Katsuragi Hitokotonushi Shrine (葛城一言主神社, Katsuragi Hitokotonushi Jinja)
- Mizuwake Shrine (水分神社, Mizuwake Jinja)
- Mount Kaina Kuhonji (戒那山九品寺, Kaina-san Kuhonji)
- Shin'iji (信行寺)
- Shōfukuji (勝福寺)

== Gallery ==
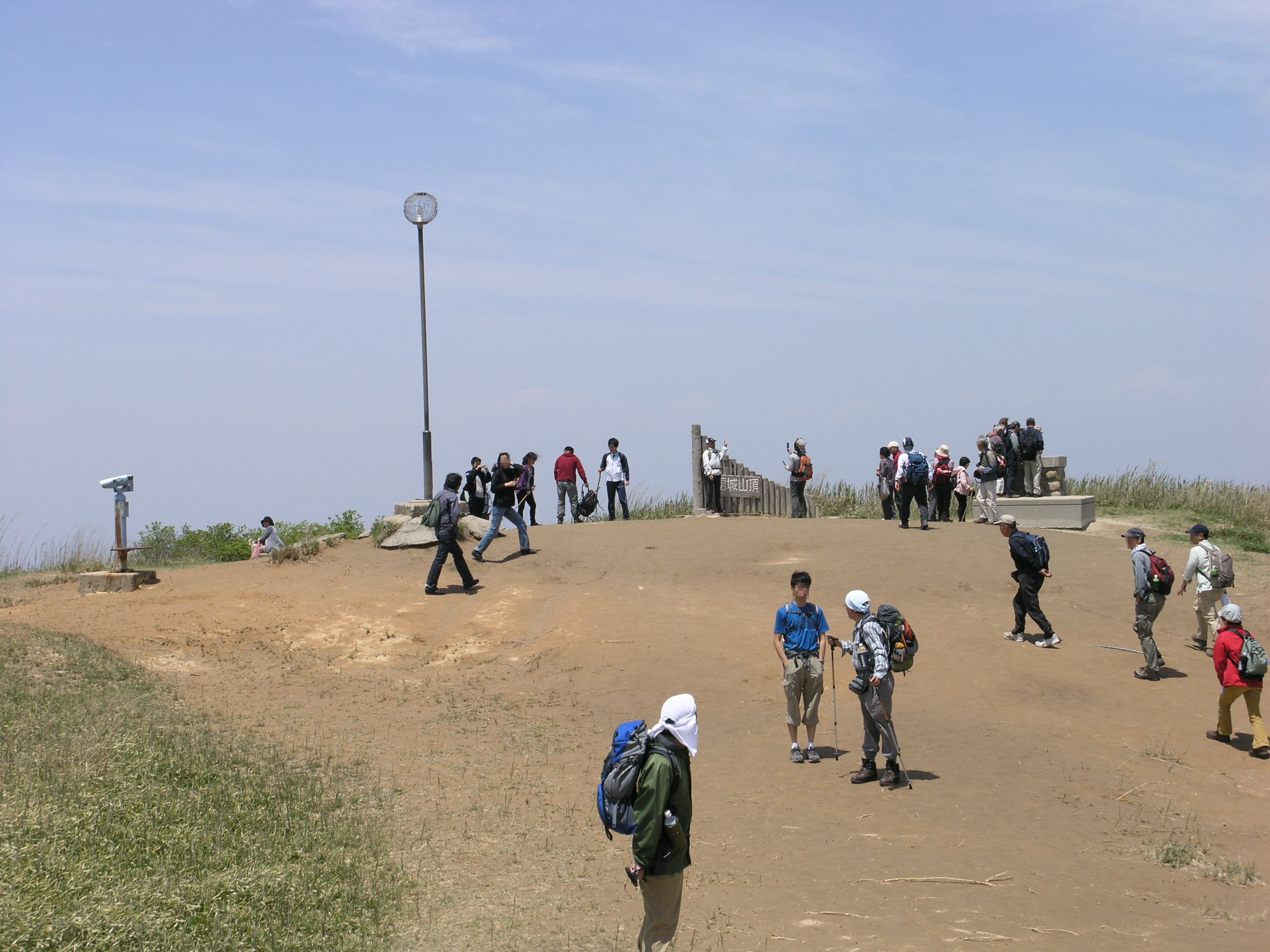
The summit

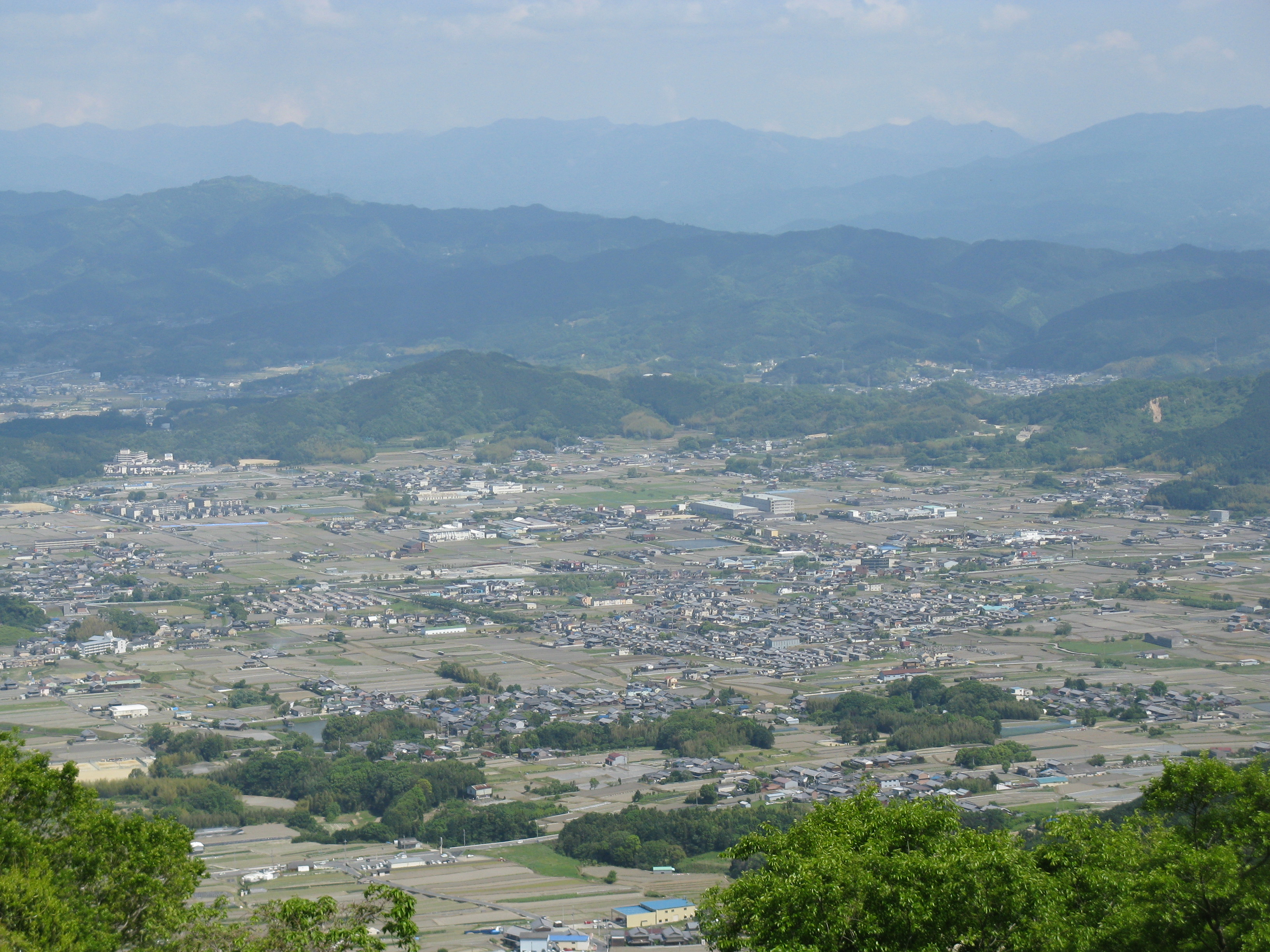
View from halfway up the Kitaone Trail

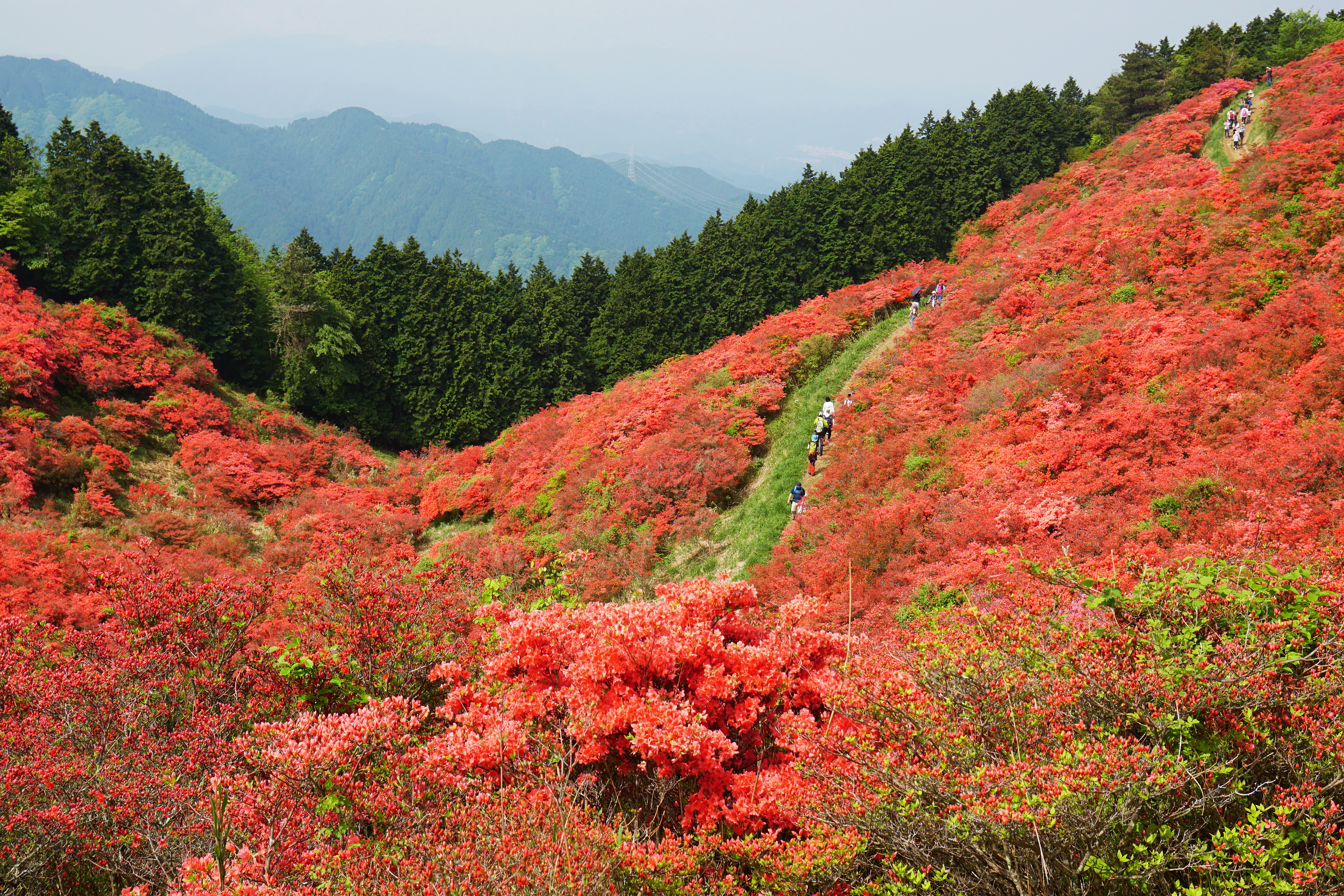
Tsutsujien, just south of the lodge

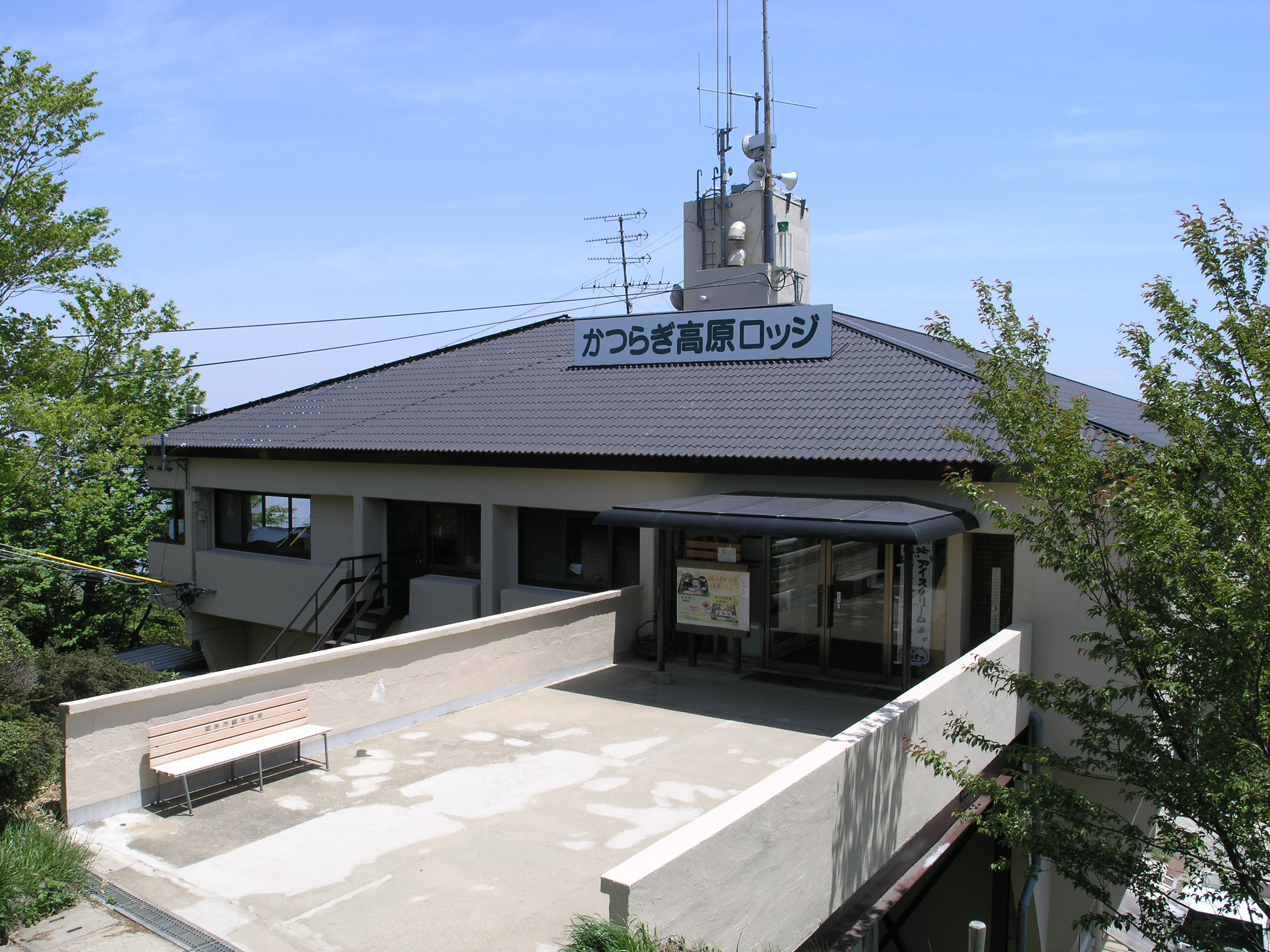
Katsuragi Kogen Lodge

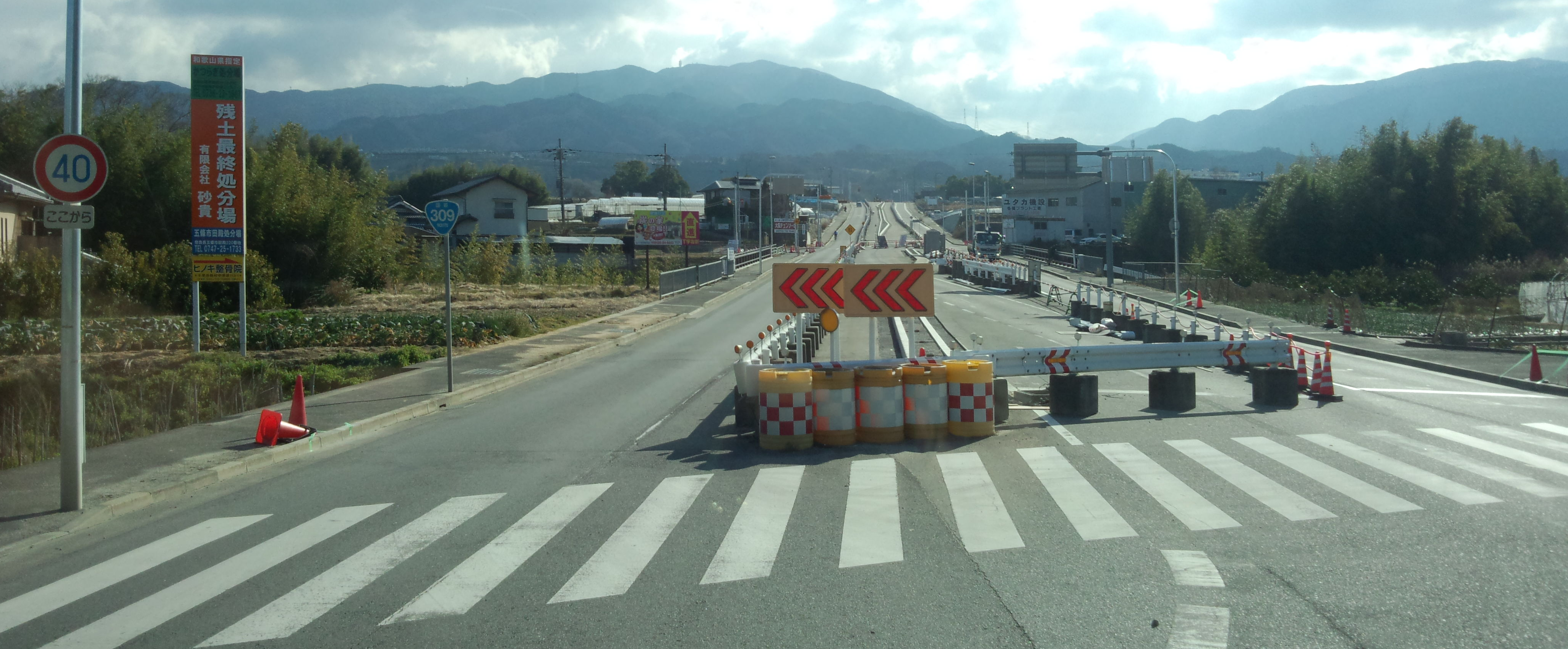
View of Mount Yamato Katsuragi from the Osaka side (west)

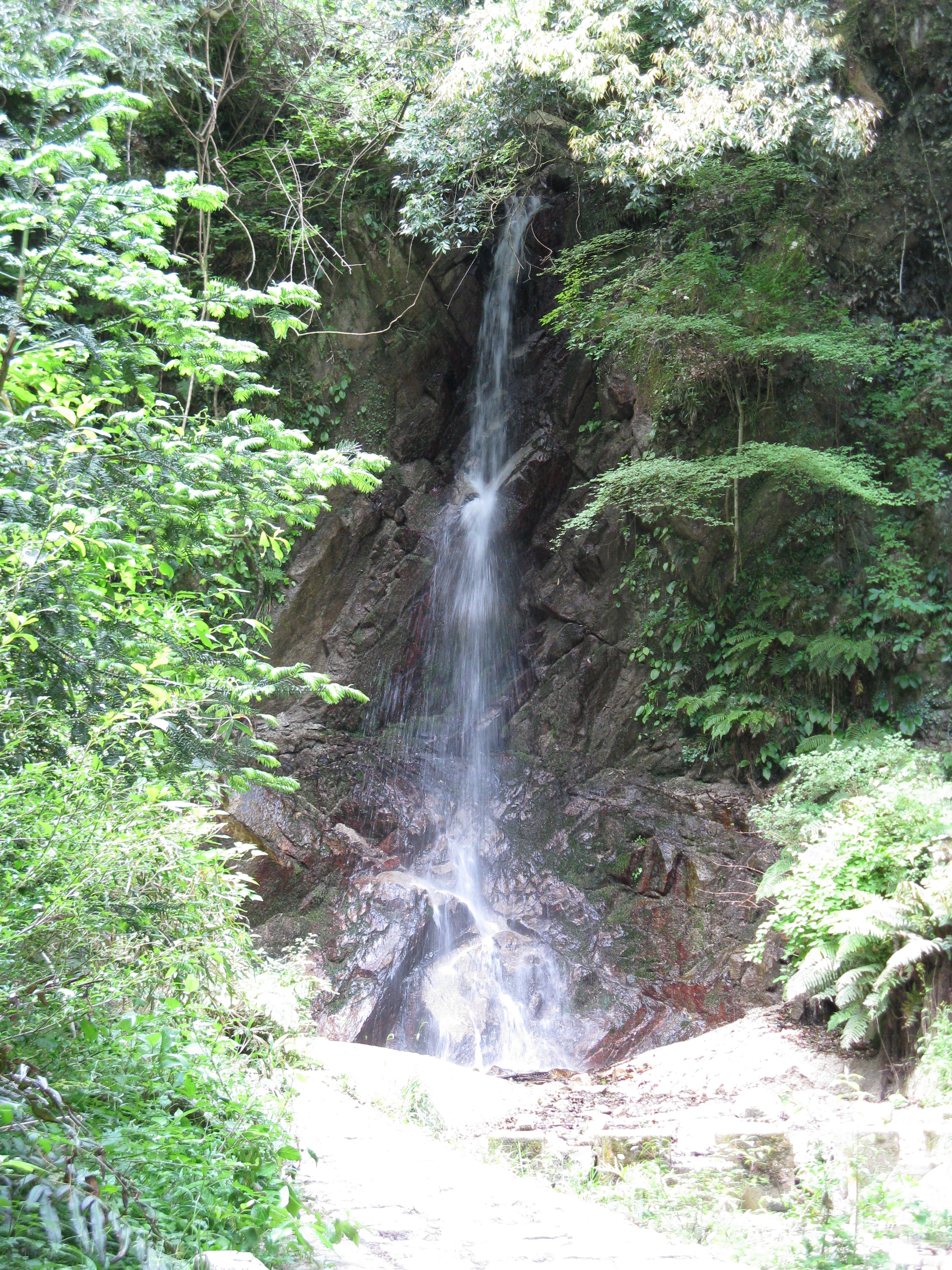
Kujira Waterfall, about 10–15 minutes walk west from Tozanguchi Station at the base

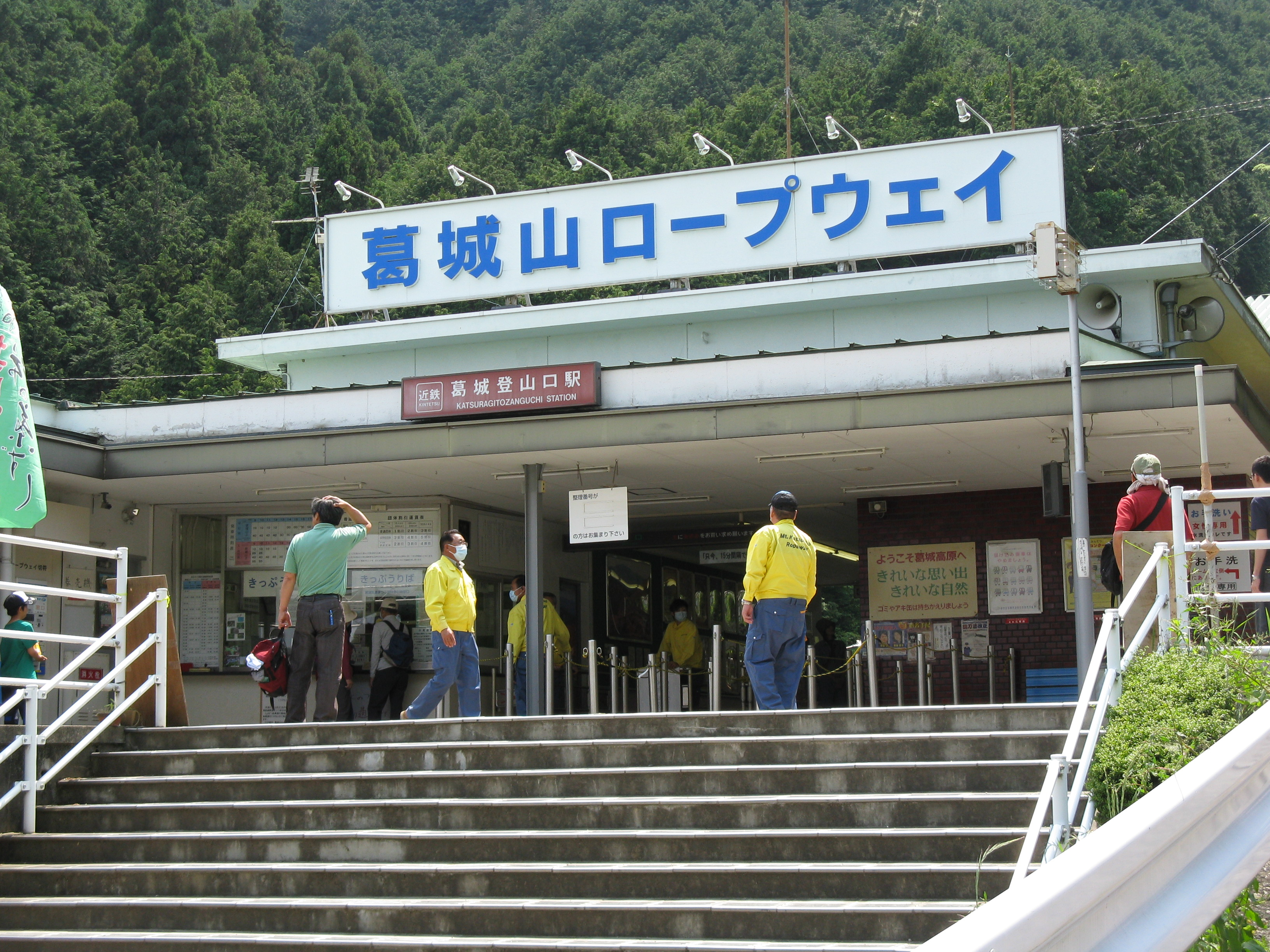
Tozanguchi Station, at the base of the Katsuragisan Ropeway
