= Yomi =

Japanese word for the land of the dead

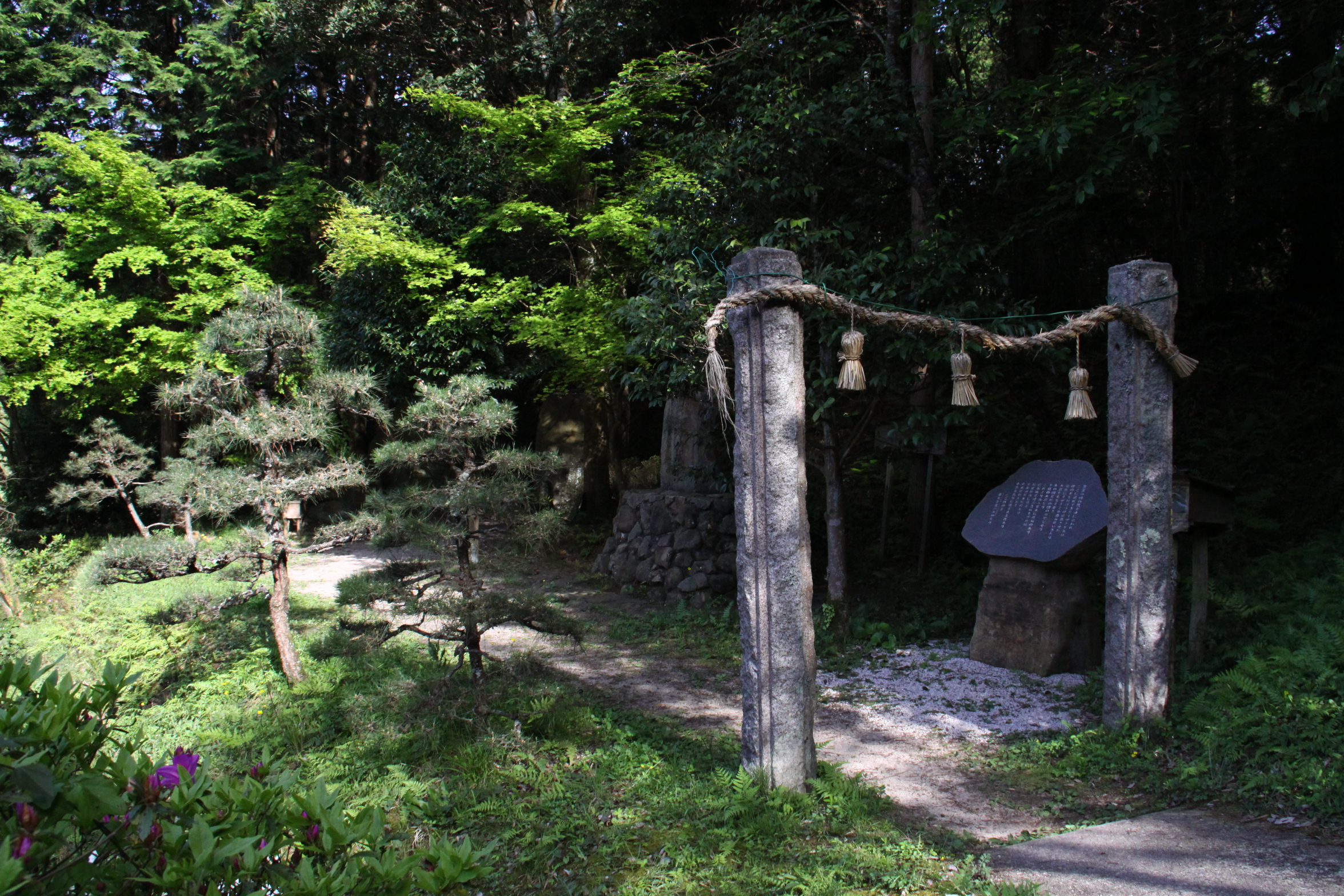
Yomotsu Hirasaka in Higashiizumo, Matsue, Shimane Prefecture

Yomi or Yomi-no-kuni (黄泉, 黄泉の国, or 黄泉ノ国) is the Japanese word for the land of the dead (World of Darkness). According to Shinto mythology as related in Kojiki, this is where the dead go in the afterlife. Once one has eaten at the hearth of Yomi it is (mostly) impossible to return to the land of the living. Yomi is most commonly known for Izanami's retreat to that place after her death. Izanagi followed her there and upon his return he washed himself, creating Amaterasu from his left eye, Susanoo from his nostrils, and Tsukuyomi-no-Mikoto from his right eye in the process.

This realm of the dead shares geographical continuity with the living world, where souls "remain eternally in Japan." Yomi cannot be thought of as a paradise to which one would aspire, nor can it appropriately be described as a hell in which one suffers retribution for past deeds; rather, all deceased carry on a gloomy and shadowy existence in perpetuity, regardless of their behavior in life. Some "suggest that the concept of a life after death was not a familiar one to the ancient Japanese and it only took form with the introduction of Buddhism from China in the 6th century CE." Scholars believe that the image of Yomi was derived from ancient Japanese tombs in which corpses were left for some time to decompose, an image believed to reflect the structure of the burial mounds (kofun) of the late Kofun period.

The kanji that are sometimes used to transcribe Yomi actually refer to the mythological Chinese realm of the dead called Diyu or Huángquán (黄泉, lit. "Yellow Springs"), which appears in Chinese texts as early as the eighth century BCE. This dark and vaguely defined realm was believed to be located beneath the earth, but it was not until the Han dynasty that the Chinese had a clearly articulated conception of an underworld below in contrast with a heavenly realm above. The characters are jukujikun, i.e. were used without regard to the actual meaning of the word Yomi, which is unknown. With regard to Japanese mythology, Yomi is generally taken by commentators to lie beneath the earth and is part of a triad of locations discussed in Kojiki: Takamahara (高天原, also: Takamagahara; lit. "high heavenly plane", located in the sky), Ashihara-no-Nakatsukuni (葦原の中つ国; lit. "central land of reed plane") located on earth, and Yomo-tsu-kuni (黄泉国) or Yomi-no-Kuni (黄泉の国; lit. "Land of Yomi") located underground. Yomi has also often been associated with the mythological realm of Ne-no-kuni (根の国; lit. "Root Land / Land of Origin"), also known as Ne-no-Katasukuni (根の堅洲国; lit. "firm/hard-packed shoal land of origin"), the underground realm to which Izanagi banished his son Susanoo.

According to Shinto, Yomi is ruled over by Izanami no Mikoto, the Grand Deity of Yomi (Yomo-tsu-Ōkami 黄泉大神). According to Kojiki, the entrance to Yomi lies in Izumo province and was sealed off by Izanagi upon his flight from Yomi, at which time he permanently blocked the entrance by placing a massive boulder (Chigaeshi no ōkami 道反の大神) at the base of the slope that leads to Yomi (Yomotsu Hirasaka 黄泉平坂 or 黄泉比良坂). Upon his return to Ashihara-no-Nakatsukuni, Izanagi noted that Yomi is a "polluted land" (kegareki kuni). This opinion reflects the traditional Shinto association between death and pollution, or (kegare). Susanoo later became lord of this same realm, subjecting Ōkuninushi to a series of trials there when he fled to it.

== Christian uses ==
Some Japanese Christian texts use 黄泉 to refer to what is called Hell in the English versions. For example, Revelation 6:8.,

そこで見ていると、見よ、青白い馬が出てきた。そして、それに乗っている者の名は「死」と言い、それに黄泉が従っていた。

Translation:

And I looked, and behold a pale horse: and his name that sat on him was Death, and Hell followed with him

Sometimes 黄泉 means Hades or Sheol, whereas 地獄 means Gehenna. However 陰府 (yomi) is used in some translations.

== See also ==
- Yomotsu Hirasaka
