= Nōkanshi =

Japanese ritual mortician

A nōkanshi (納棺師) or yukanshi (湯灌師) is a Japanese ritual mortician.

Japanese funerals are highly ritualized affairs which are generally—though not always—conducted in accordance with Buddhist rites. In preparation for the funeral, the body is washed and the orifices are blocked with cotton or gauze. The encoffining ritual (called nōkan), as depicted in the film Departures, is rarely performed, and even then only in rural areas. This ceremony is not standardized, but generally involves professional nōkanshi (Note: Also called morticians (湯灌師, yukanshi); yukan is the ceremonial cleansing of the body that comes before the nōkan proper.) ritually preparing the body, dressing the dead in white, and sometimes applying make-up. The body is then put on dry ice in a casket, along with personal possessions and items necessary for the trip to the afterlife.

Despite the importance of death rituals, in traditional Japanese culture the subject is considered unclean as everything related to death is thought to be a source of kegare (defilement). After coming into contact with the dead, individuals must cleanse themselves through purifying rituals. People who work closely with the dead, such as morticians, are thus considered unclean, and during the feudal era those whose work was related to death became untouchables, forced to live in their own hamlets and discriminated against by wider society. Despite a cultural shift since the Meiji Restoration of 1868, the stigma of death still has considerable force within Japanese society, and discrimination against the untouchables has continued. (Note: For a more detailed discussion of the position of kegare and death in Japanese society, see Okuyama 2013, pp. 8–12.)

Until 1972, most deaths were dealt with by families, funeral homes, or nōkanshi. As of 2014, about 80% of deaths occur in hospitals, and preparation of the bodies is frequently done by hospital staff; in such cases, the family often does not see the body until the funeral.
