= Ōharae =

Japanese purification rite and festival

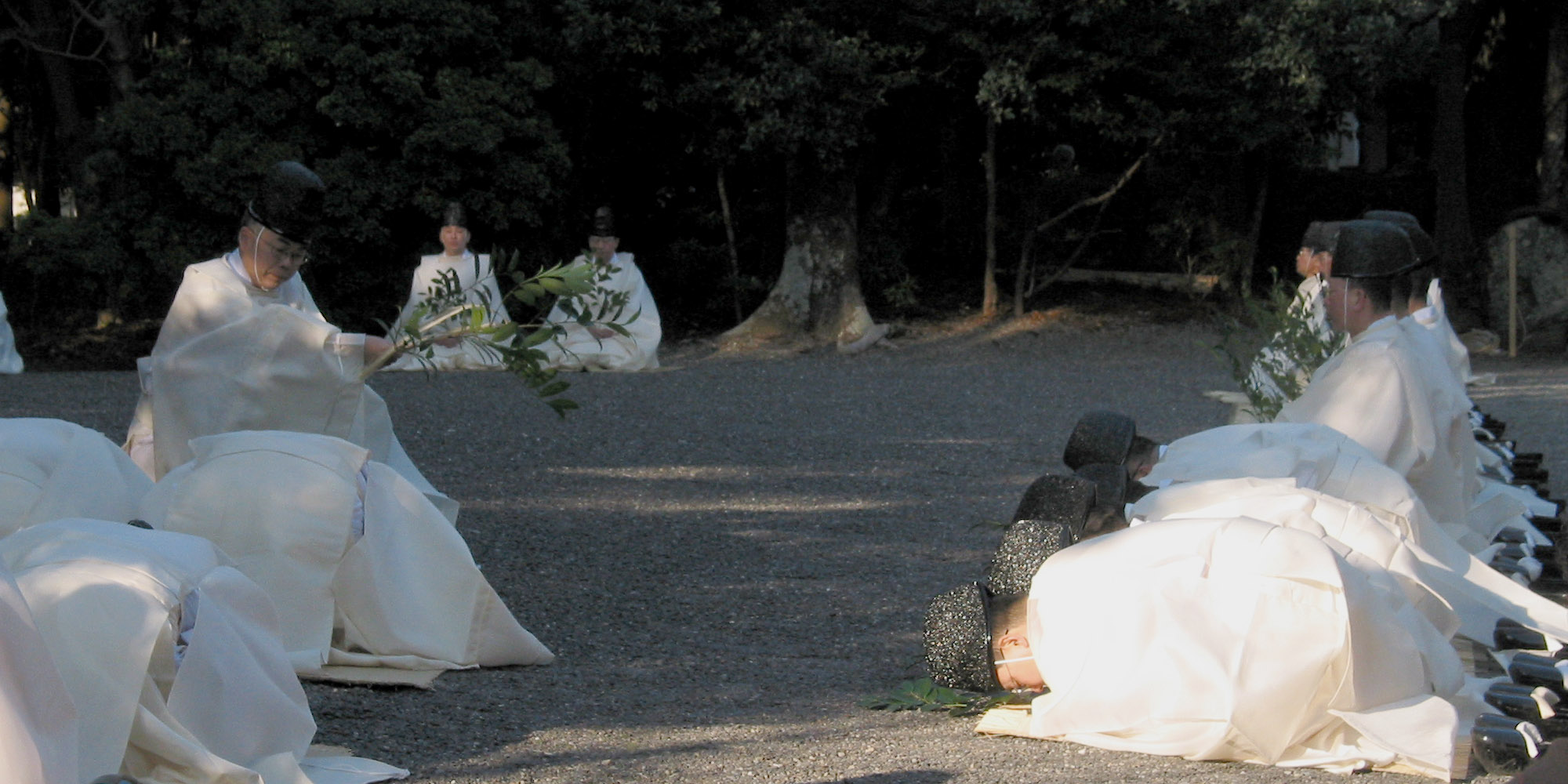
Ōharae on the last day of the year, at Daiichi-Torii-Nai-Haraedo, Naiku

The Ōharae (大祓; "Great Purification") is a Shinto purification ritual held across Japan on June 30th and December 31st in order to purify the tsumi and kegare accumulated in the six months prior to the ceremony.
