= Gaudium =

Gaudium, the Latin word for joy, may refer to:

- Gaudium, a genus of flowering plants in the family Myrtaceae
- Gaudium et spes, the Pastoral Constitution on the Church in the Modern World, from the Second Vatican Council
- An internal sin, the dwelling with complacency on sins already committed
- 8061 Gaudium, a minor planet

== See also ==
- Gaudius
