= Sin =

Transgression against divine law

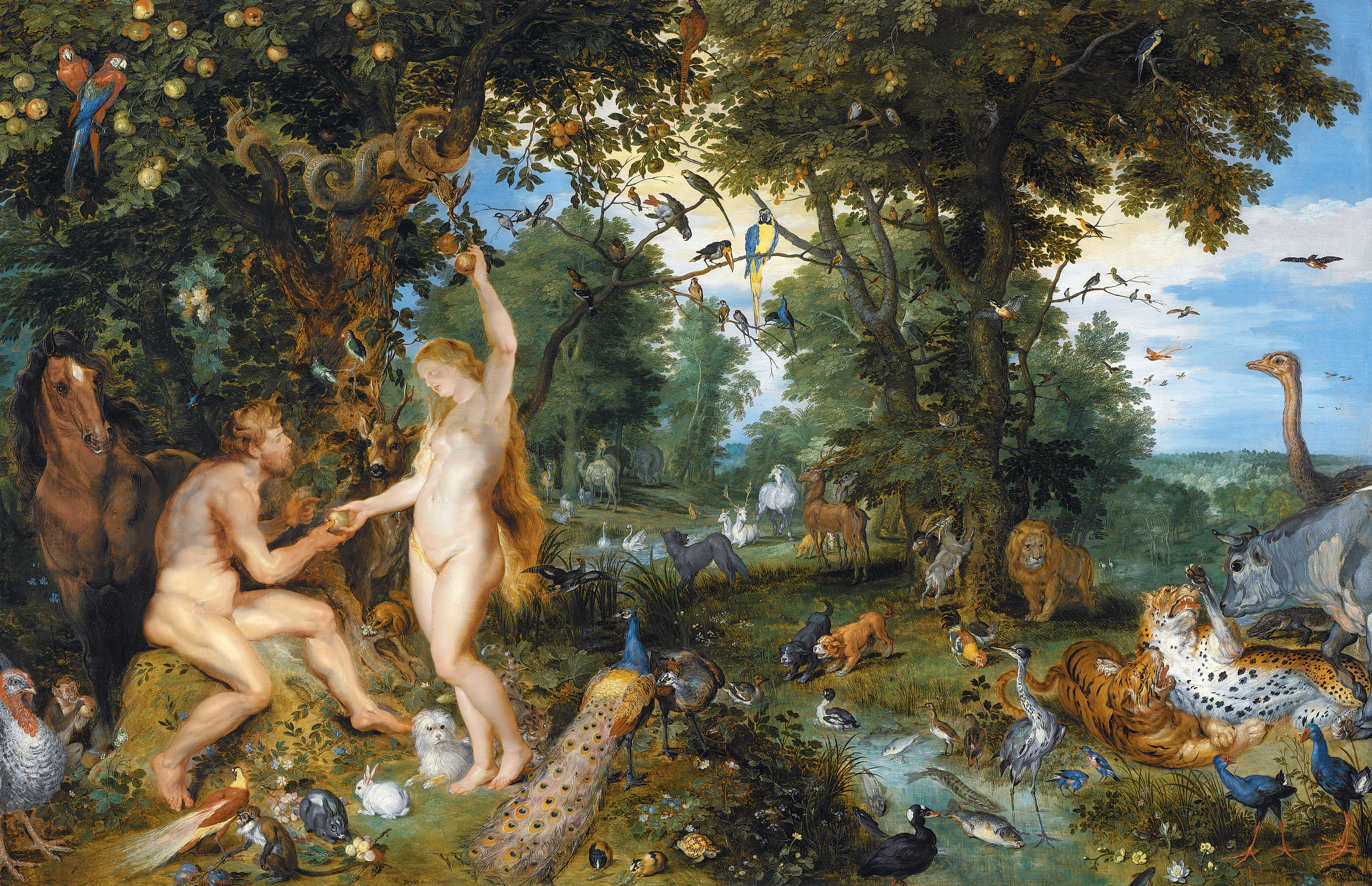
Depiction of the sin of Adam and Eve (The Garden of Eden with the Fall of Man by Jan Brueghel the Elder and Pieter Paul Rubens)

The term sin originates from the Old English word synn, tracing back to Proto-Germanic and Proto-Indo-European roots meaning "being" or "truly guilty", implying a judgment of wrongdoing. Over time, different religions and cultures developed distinct understandings of sin, often shaping moral frameworks and spiritual practices. Each culture has its own interpretation of what it means to commit a sin. While sins are generally considered actions, any thought, word, or act considered immoral, amoral, selfish, shameful, harmful, or alienating might be termed "sinful".

In Abrahamic religions, sin carries a stronger theological dimension. Christianity treats sin as an offense against God, rooted in disobedience, with doctrines like original sin and redemption through Christ’s sacrifice; concepts like the seven deadly sins classify vices leading to moral corruption. In mainstream Christianity, sin is a transgression against the will of God. Islam defines sin (khiṭʾ, ithm) as violating God’s commands, distinguishing between minor and grave sins. Judaism frames sin as “missing the mark” of God’s law, placing greater weight on wrongs against other people than against God, with atonement often requiring repentance and restitution.

According to Hinduism, pāpa (sin) is a transgression, or demerit, signifying deeds or intentions that transgress moral and spiritual laws, resulting in negative karma and tying a person to the cycle of rebirth (samsara). Hindu codes list various things that drive people to sin themselves. Hindu texts mention various categories of sins such as foremost sins (ati patakas), five greatest sins (maha patakas), secondary sins (upa patakas), and minor sins (prasangika patakas).

In Buddhism, sin as defiance against a deity does not exist; instead, actions naturally bring consequences through karma. While general “sin” refers to transgressions against universal moral law, five acts — harming a Buddha, killing an Arhat, creating schism in the Sangha, matricide, and patricide — are considered so severe that they bring immediate karmic repercussions. In contrast, Shinto views sin (tsumi) as impurity caused by external factors like evil spirits, not inherently by human actions, and emphasizes purification rituals (harae) to restore harmony.

== Etymology ==
From Middle English sinne, synne, sunne, zen, from Old English synn ("sin"), from Proto-West Germanic *sunnju, from Proto-Germanic *sunjō ('truth', 'excuse') and *sundī, *sundijō ("sin"), from Proto-Indo-European *h₁s-ónt-ih₂, from *h₁sónts ("being, true", implying a verdict of "truly guilty" against an accusation or charge), from *h₁es- ("to be"); compare Old English sōþ ("true"; see sooth).

== Buddhism ==
There are a few differing Buddhist views on sin. American Zen author Brad Warner states that in Buddhism there is no concept of sin at all. The Buddha Dharma Education Association also expressly states "The idea of sin or original sin has no place in Buddhism."

Ethnologist Christoph von Fürer-Haimendorf explained, "In Buddhist thinking the whole universe, men as well as gods, are subject to a reign of law. Every action, good or bad, has an inevitable and automatic effect in a long chain of causes, an effect that is independent of the will of any deity. Even though this may leave no room for the concept of 'sin' in the sense of an act of defiance against the authority of a personal god, Buddhists speak of 'sin' when referring to transgressions against the universal moral code."

However, there are five heinous crimes in Buddhism that bring immediate disaster through karmic process. These five crimes are collectively referred to as Anantarika-karma in Theravada Buddhism and pañcānantarya (Pāli) in the Mahayana Sutra Preached by the Buddha on the Total Extinction of the Dharma, The five crimes or sins are:

1. Injuring a Buddha
2. Killing an Arhat
3. Creating schism in the society of Sangha
4. Matricide
5. Patricide

== Christianity ==
=== Hamartiology ===
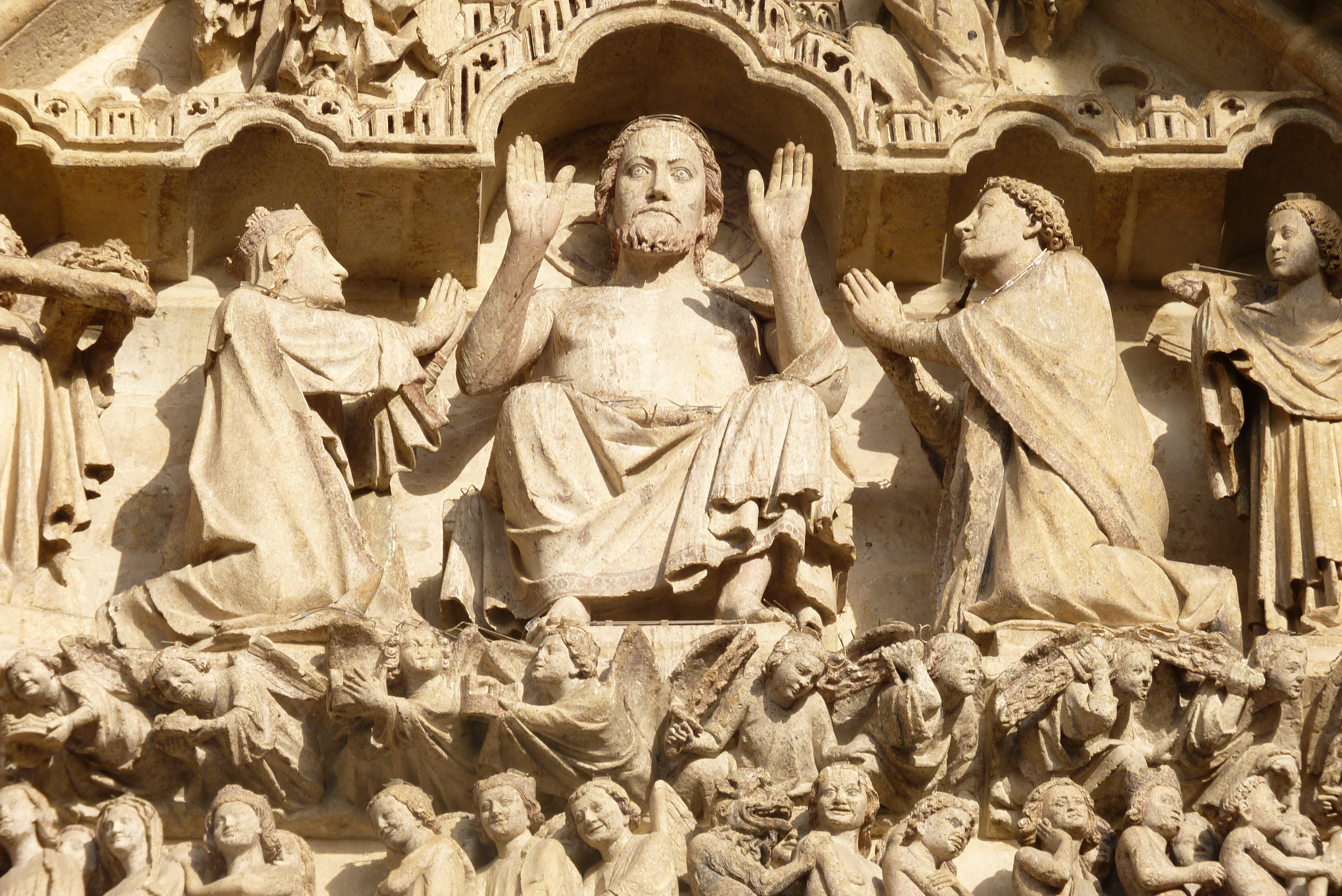
A sculpture depicting the judgment of sinners by Jesus at Amiens Cathedral, France

The doctrine of sin is central to Christianity, since its basic message is about redemption in Christ. Christian hamartiology describes sin as an act of offense against God by despising his persons and Christian biblical law, and by injuring others. According to the classical definition of St. Augustine of Hippo sin is "a word, deed, or desire in opposition to the eternal law of God". Thus, sin requires redemption, a metaphor alluding to atonement, in which the death of Jesus is the price that is paid to release the faithful from the bondage of sin.

Among some scholars, sin is understood mostly as a legal infraction or contract violation of non-binding philosophical frameworks and perspectives of Christian ethics, and so salvation tends to be viewed in legal terms. Other Christian scholars understand sin to be fundamentally relational—a loss of love for the Christian God and an elevation of self-love (concupiscence, in this sense), as was later propounded by Augustine in his debate with the Pelagians. As with the legal definition of sin, this definition also affects the understanding of Christian grace and salvation, which are thus viewed in relational terms.

The concept of the seven deadly sins holds a significant place within Christian teaching as a classification of seven major vices that lead to further immoral behavior and other sins. These sins are pride, greed, wrath, envy, lust, gluttony, and sloth. They are considered "deadly" because they are the root causes of other sins and moral corruption, opposing the virtues that Christians are encouraged to cultivate such as humility, charity, and patience. The idea of the seven deadly sins originated in early Christian thought and was later formalized by figures such as Pope Gregory I and St. Thomas Aquinas. While not identical to mortal sins, the seven deadly sins are viewed as capital vices from which many other sins arise, thus emphasizing the need for redemption and moral vigilance in the Christian life.

=== Original sin ===
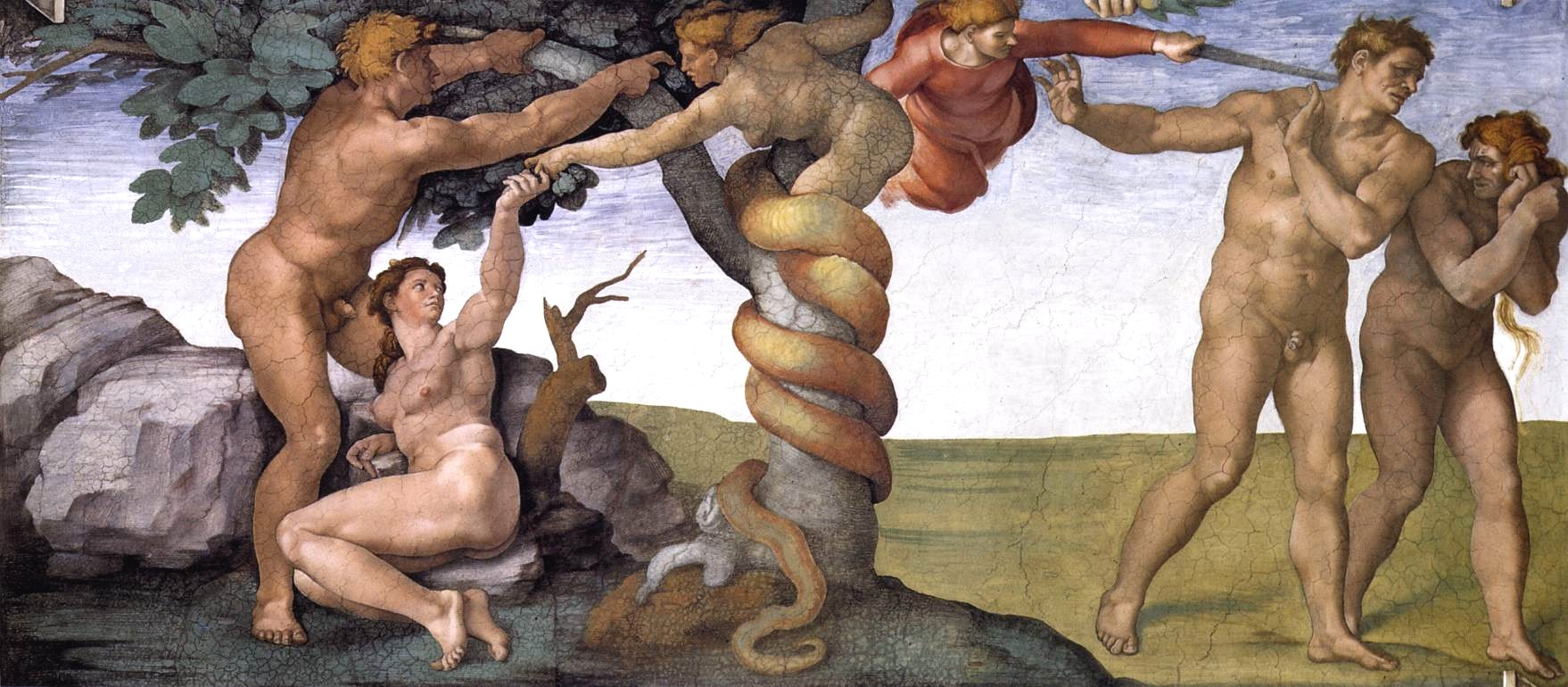
A Sistine Chapel fresco depicts the expulsion of Adam and Eve for transgressing God's command not to eat the fruit of the Tree of the knowledge of good and evil.

This condition has been characterized in many ways, from the desire to commit wrongful action, referred to as a "sin nature", to total depravity and "utter helplessness even to exercise a good will toward God apart from God's supernatural, assisting grace".

The concept of original sin was first alluded to in the 2nd century by Irenaeus, Bishop of Lyon in his controversy with certain dualist Gnostics. Other church fathers such as Augustine also shaped and developed the doctrine, seeing it as based on the New Testament teaching of Paul the Apostle (Romans 5:12–21 and 1 Corinthians 15:21–22) and the Old Testament verse of Psalms 51:5. Tertullian, Cyprian, Ambrose and Ambrosiaster considered that humanity shares in Adam's sin, transmitted by human generation. Augustine's formulation of original sin after 412 CE was popular among Protestant reformers, such as Martin Luther and John Calvin, who equated original sin with concupiscence (or "hurtful desire"), affirming that it persisted even after baptism and completely destroyed freedom to do good. Before 412 CE, Augustine said that free will was weakened but not destroyed by original sin. But after 412 CE this changed to a loss of free will except to sin. Calvinism holds the later Augustinian soteriology view. The Jansenist movement, which the Catholic Church declared to be heretical, also maintained that original sin destroyed freedom of will. Instead the Catholic Church declares that Baptism erases original sin. Methodist theology teaches that original sin is eradicated through entire sanctification.

== Hinduism ==
According to Hinduism, pāpa (sin) is an important concept that is tied to the cycle of rebirth (samsara). Every action (kriya) of a living being (karta) leads to a reaction and an associated result, which forms the concept of karma. Every transgression, or demerit, signifying deeds or intentions that transgress moral and spiritual laws, results in negative karma called papa which leads to the cycle of rebirth (samsara) to continue. Hindu texts mention various things that are not themselves sin but drive people to sin themselves. Manusmriti mentions five greatest sins (maha patakas). There are other activities (anupatakas) which are mentioned as equivalent to committing these five great sins. Texts also mention foremost sins (ati patakas), which include crimes that are punished with the highest penalty. Other Hindu texts mention various secondary sins (upa patakas), and minor sins (prasangika patakas). One has to either feel remorse (paścātāpa) or atone for the sins committed (prāyaścitta) through confession, attaining knowledge, sacrifice, virtuous conduct, charity, or by prayer and performing rituals.

== Islam ==
Sin (khiṭʾ) is an important concept in Islamic ethics. Muslims see sin as anything that goes against the commands of God (Allah), a breach of the laws and norms laid down by the faith.

Islamic terms for sin include dhanb and khaṭīʾa, which are synonymous and refer to intentional sins; khiṭʾ, which means simply "a sin"; and ithm, which is used for grave sins.

== Judaism ==
Judaism regards the violation of any of the 613 commandments as a sin. Judaism teaches that sin is a part of life, since there is no perfect man and everyone has an inclination to do evil. Sin has many classifications and degrees, but the principal classification is that of "missing the mark" (cheit in Hebrew). Some sins are punishable with death by the court, others with death by heaven, others with lashes, and others without such punishment, but no sins committed with willful intentions go without consequence. Sins committed out of lack of knowledge are not considered sins, since sin cannot be a sin if the one who committed it did not know it was wrong. Unintentional sins are considered less severe sins.

Sins between people are considered much more serious in Judaism than sins between man and God. Yom Kippur, the main day of repentance in Judaism, can atone for sins between man and God, but not for sins between man and his fellow, that is until he has appeased his friend. Eleazar ben Azariah derived [this from the verse]: "From all your sins before God you shall be cleansed" (Book of Leviticus, 16:30) – for sins between man and God Yom Kippur atones, but for sins between man and his fellow Yom Kippur does not atone until he appeases his fellow.

When the Temple yet stood in Jerusalem, people would offer Korbanot (sacrifices) for their misdeeds. The atoning aspect of korbanot is carefully circumscribed. For the most part, korbanot only expiates unintentional sins, that is, sins committed because a person forgot that this thing was a sin or by mistake. No atonement is needed for violations committed under duress or through lack of knowledge, and for the most part, korbanot cannot atone for a malicious, deliberate sin. In addition, korbanot have no expiating effect unless the person making the offering sincerely repents of his or her actions before making the offering, and makes restitution to any person who was harmed by the violation.

Judaism teaches that all willful sin has consequences. The completely righteous suffer for their sins (by humiliation, poverty, and suffering that God sends them) in this world and receive their reward in the world to come. The in-between (not completely righteous or completely wicked), suffer for and repent their sins after death and thereafter join the righteous. The very evil do not repent even at the gates of hell. Such people prosper in this world to receive their reward for any good deed, but cannot be cleansed by and hence cannot leave gehinnom, because they do not or cannot repent. This world can therefore seem unjust where the righteous suffer, while the wicked prosper. Many great thinkers have contemplated this.

== Shinto ==
The Shinto concept of sin is inexorably linked to concepts of purity and pollution. Shinto does not have a concept of original sin and instead believes that all human beings are born pure. Sin, also called Tsumi, is anything that makes people impure (i.e. anything that separates them from the kami). However, Shinto does not believe this impurity is the result of human actions, but rather the result of evil spirits or other external factors.

Sin can have a variety of consequences in Japan, including disaster and disease. Therefore, purification rituals, or Harae, are viewed as important not just to the spiritual and physical health of the individual but also to the well-being of the nation.

== See also ==
- Actual sin
- Crime
- Devil
- Ethics in religion
- Haram
- Internal sin
- Karma
- Morality
- Religious law
- Sin offering
- Taboo
- Vice
- Wickedness
