= Japanese funeral =

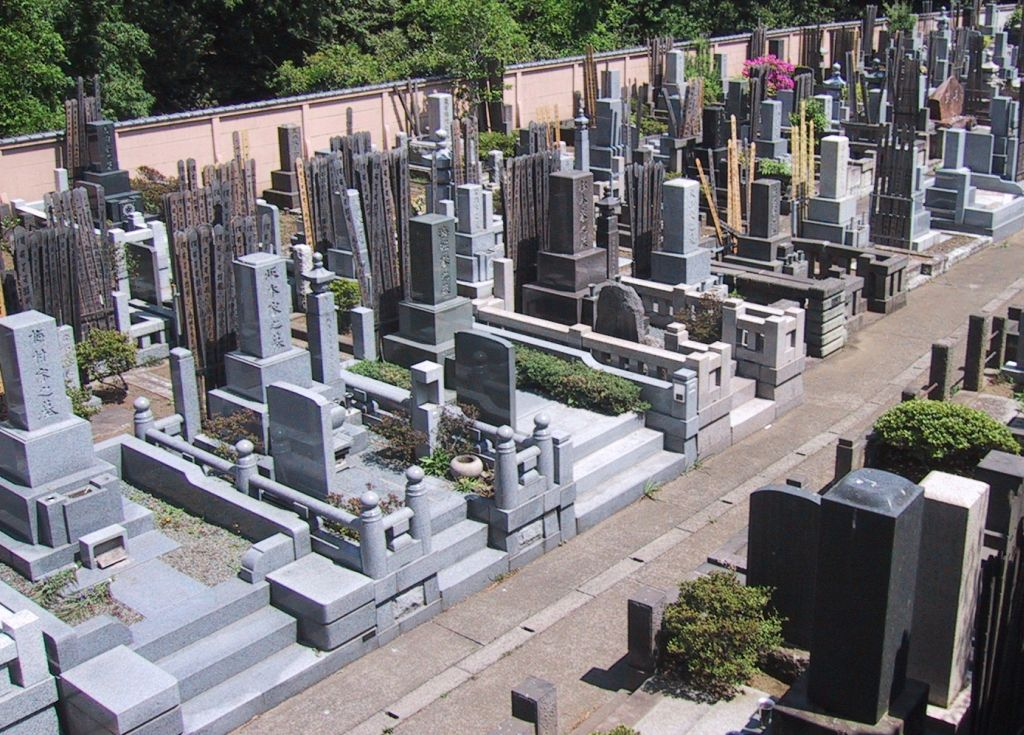
A graveyard in Tokyo

The majority of funerals (葬儀, sōgi or 葬式, sōshiki) in Japan include a wake, the cremation of the deceased, a burial in a family grave, and a periodic memorial service. According to 2007 statistics, 99.81% of deceased Japanese are cremated.

Other practices in Japan include Shinto funerals and the Ryukyuan people’s indigenous sepultural culture.

== Modern funerals ==
=== After death ===
Although Japan has become a more secular society (see Religion in Japan), as of 2007, 90% of funerals are conducted as Buddhist ceremonies. Immediately after a death (or in prior eras, just before an expected death), relatives moisten the dying or deceased person's lips with water, a practice known as water of the last moment (末期の水, matsugo-no-mizu). Most Japanese homes keep Buddhist altars or butsudan (仏壇), for use in Buddhist ceremonies; many also have Shinto shrines, or kamidana (神棚). When a death occurs, the shrine is closed and covered with white paper to keep out the impure spirits of the dead, a custom called kamidana-fūji (神棚封じ). A small table set with flowers, incense, and a candle is placed next to the deceased's bed.

Relatives and authorities are then informed, and a death certificate is issued. Funeral arrangements are made typically by the eldest son, beginning with contacting a temple to schedule the event. Some days are more auspicious than others, based on an old Chinese six-day lunar cycle; in particular, the second day, called tomobiki (友引), is superstitiously understood to mean "pulling your friends along with you" (tomo = friends; hiku = pull, although the original significance was different) and is therefore considered a very bad day for a funeral but an auspicious one for a wedding.

The body is washed and its orifices are blocked with cotton or gauze. An "encoffining" ritual (nōkan) is sometimes performed, in which professional nōkansha (納棺者) ritually dress and prepare the body then place it in the coffin, as portrayed in the 2008 film Departures. The ceremony is now rarely performed, and may be limited to rural areas where older traditions are maintained. Whether or not the encoffining is performed, a deceased female is dressed in a white kimono, and a deceased male is dressed in a suit or a kimono. Makeup may be also applied. The body is put on dry ice in a casket. Items–such as a white kimono, a white triangular headband called a tenkan (天冠), a pair of sandals, six coins for crossing the River of Three Crossings, and burnable things the deceased was fond of (for example, cigarettes and candy)–are placed in the casket, which is then placed on an altar for the wake. The body is positioned with the head towards the north or, as a second choice, the west. In Buddhism, this western orientation reflects the western location of Sukhāvatī, the Pure Land of Amida Buddha.

During life, both men and women cross the front of a kimono or yukata with the left side over the right. When a corpse is clothed in a traditional kimono, the kimono is crossed right over left.

=== Wake ===
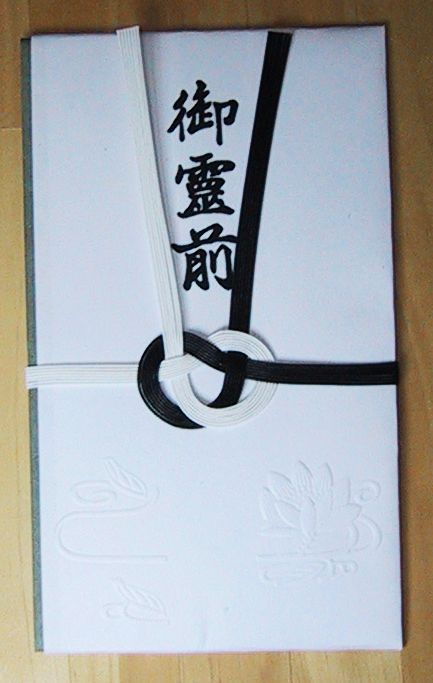
Traditional mizuhiki design of the envelope for condolence money

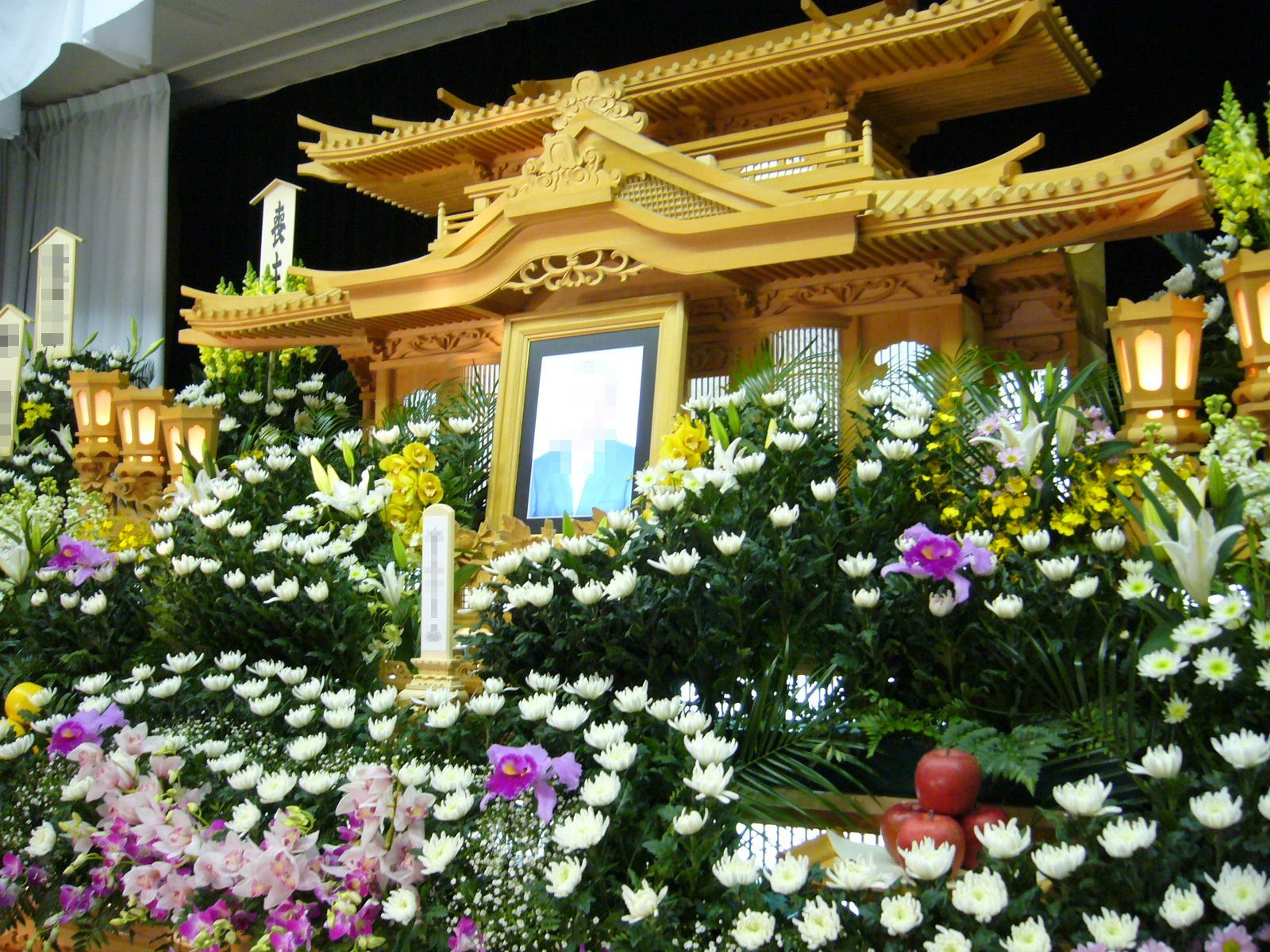
Funeral arrangement, with flower arrangements, a portrait of the deceased, and an ihai, a spirit tablet. For privacy reasons, the name of the dead person, as well as the face on the portrait are censored out via pixellation.

Held as soon as possible after death, a Japanese wake is called tsuya (通夜), lit. "passing the night". All funeral guests wear black: men wear black suits with white shirts and black ties, and women wear either black dresses or black kimono. If the deceased was an adherent of Buddhism, a set of prayer beads called juzu (数珠) may be carried by the guests. People attending the wake or funeral offer condolence money to the host/hostess, in special black-and-silver envelopes (bushūgibukuro (不祝儀袋, 'packet for anti-celebration') or kōdenbukuro (香典袋, 'packet for Buddhist incense offering')). Depending on the relationship to the deceased and the wealth of the guest, the given amount may range between 3,000 and 30,000 yen. The guests are seated, with immediate relatives seated closest to the front. The Buddhist priest then chants a section from a sutra. The family members will each offer incense three times at the incense urn placed in front of the deceased. At the same time, assembled guests will perform the same ritual at another station behind the family members' seats. The wake ends once the priest has completed reciting the sutra. Each departing guest is given a gift, valued at about half or one-fourth the condolence money received from the same guest. The closest relatives may also stay and keep vigil with the deceased overnight in the same room.

=== Funeral ===
The funeral proper, called kokubetsu-shiki (告別式), is usually on the day after the wake. The procedure is similar to the wake, and incense is again offered while a priest chants a sutra. The ceremony differs slightly as the deceased receives a new Buddhist name (戒名, kaimyō; lit. "precept name") written in kanji. This name is said to prevent the return of the deceased if their name is called. The length of the name depends also on either the virtue of the person's lifespan, or more commonly, the size of the bereaved’s donation to the temple, which result in names ranging from the generally common to the most elaborate costing 1 million yen or more. The high prices charged by temples for kaimyō are a controversial issue in Japan, especially since some temples put pressure on families to buy a more expensive name. The kanji for these kaimyō are usually very ancient, and sometimes bear esoteric meanings.

At the end of the funeral ceremony, guests and family may place flowers around the deceased's head and shoulders before the casket is sealed and borne to an elaborate hearse for transport to the crematorium. In some regions of Japan, the coffin is nailed shut by mourners using a stone.

=== Cremation ===
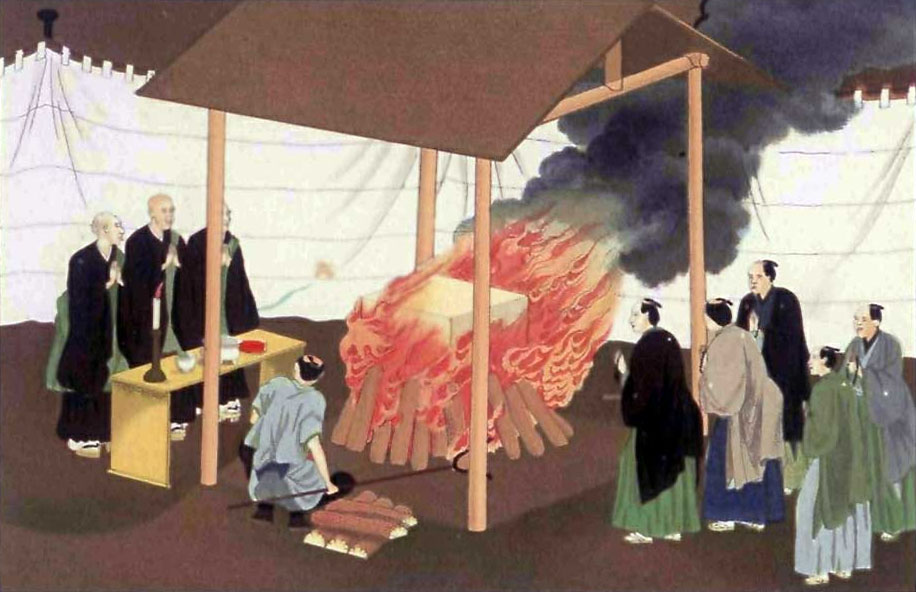
Cremation in Japan, illustration from 1867

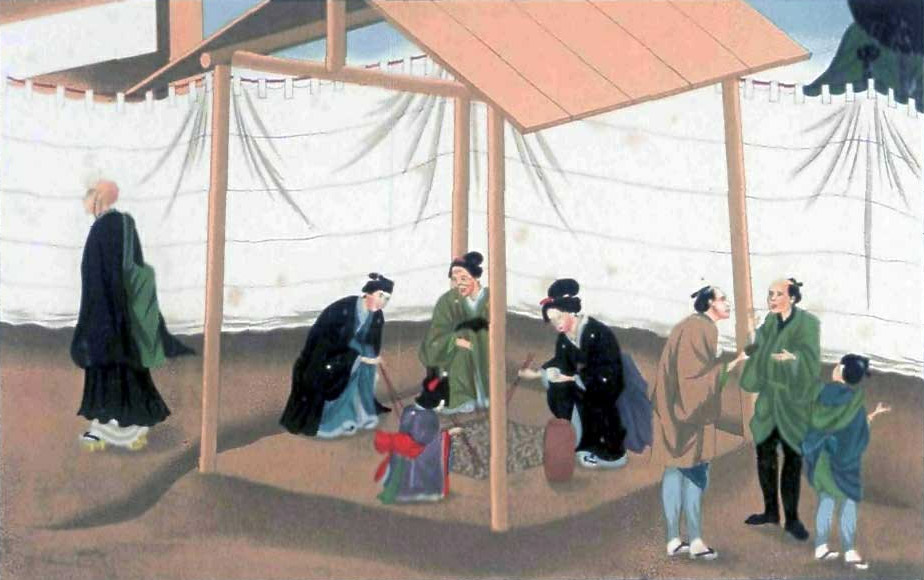
Picking the bones from the ashes, illustration from 1867

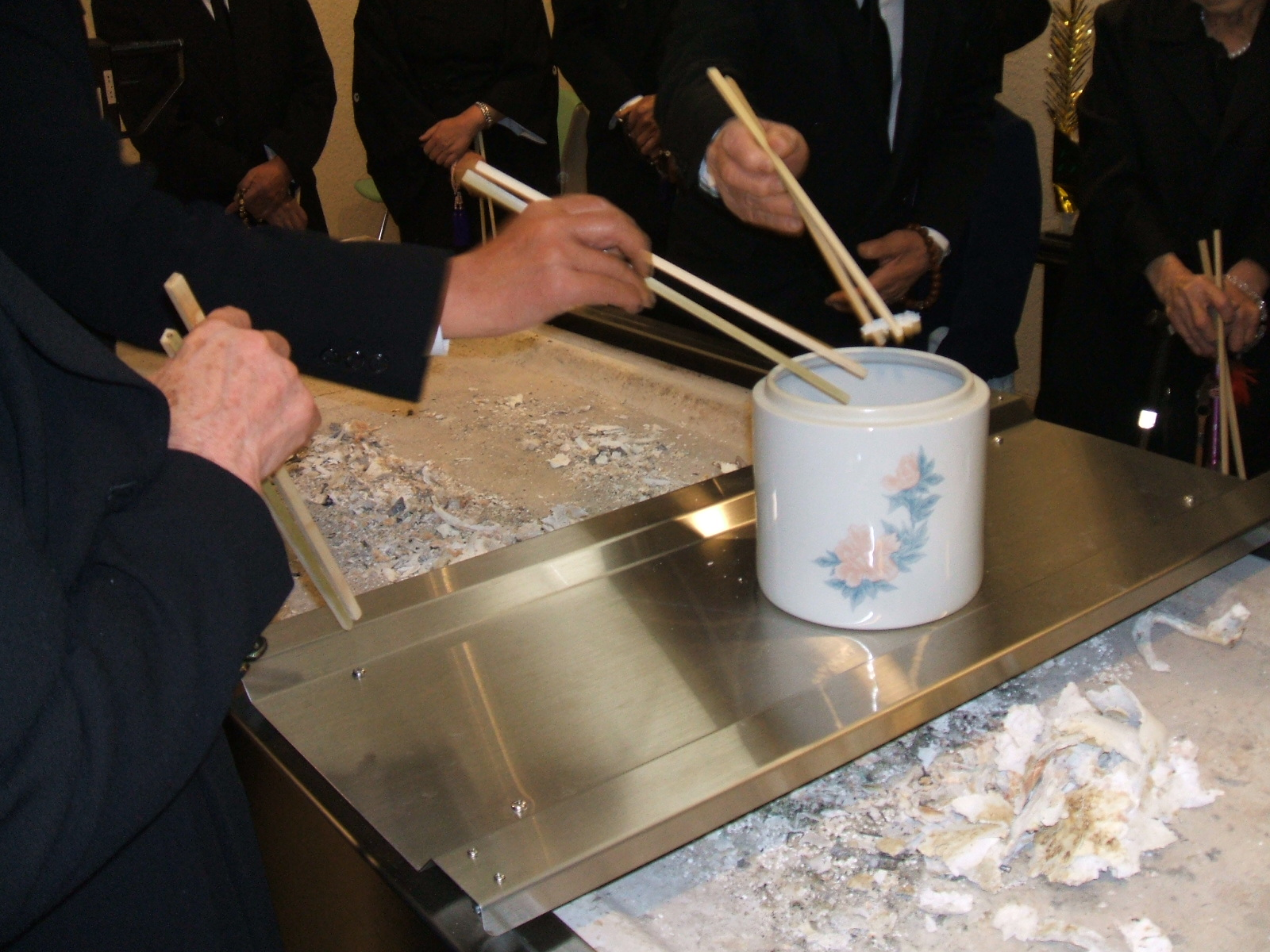
Bone-picking ceremony

The coffin is placed on a tray in the crematorium, and the family witnesses the corpse slide into the cremation chamber. A cremation usually takes about two hours, and the family returns at a scheduled time when cremation has been completed.

Relatives then pick the bones out of the ashes and transfer them to an urn using large chopsticks or metal chopsticks, with two relatives holding the same bone at the same time with their chopsticks. A variant is passing the bones from chopsticks to chopsticks. Known as kotsuage (骨上げ; or 骨揚げ), this is the only time in Japan when it is proper for two people to hold the same item at the same time with chopsticks. At all other times, holding anything with chopsticks by two people at the same time, or passing an item from chopsticks to chopsticks, is considered to be a major social faux pas as this will remind others of a funeral. The bones of the feet are picked up first, while the bones of the head are picked up last. This is to ensure that the deceased is not upside down in the urn. The nodobotoke (喉仏, lit. 'throat Buddha') is a bone located in the neck, specifically the second cervical vertebra ("axis"), and is the most significant bone to be placed in the urn. The word nodobotoke in a living person, however, refers to the visible Adam's apple, which is a different feature.

In some cases, the ashes may be divided among more than one urn. For example, some ashes go to a family grave, and some go to the temple, a company grave, or to a space burial. Depending on local custom, the urn may stay at the family home for a period or may be directly taken to the graveyard.

In the Ryukyu Islands, traditional burial was somewhat different from that in the mainland Japan. Instead of cremation, the body would be temporarily interred in the family tomb (a large burial vault, often of the turtle-back variety); after a few years, once the flesh had decomposed, the bones would be washed and put into the funerary urn, to be permanently stored elsewhere in the tomb.

=== Grave ===
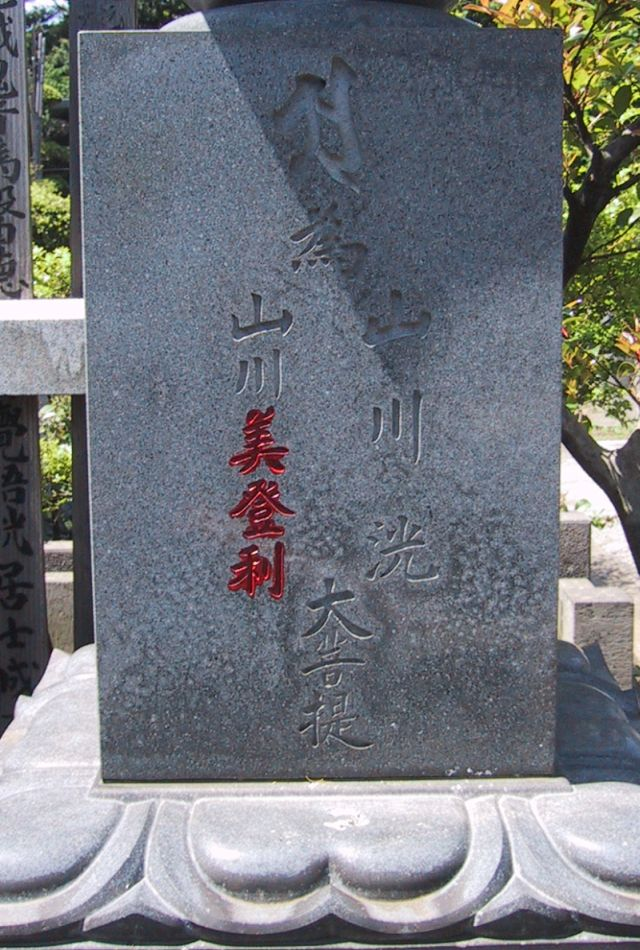
The name of a living spouse written in red

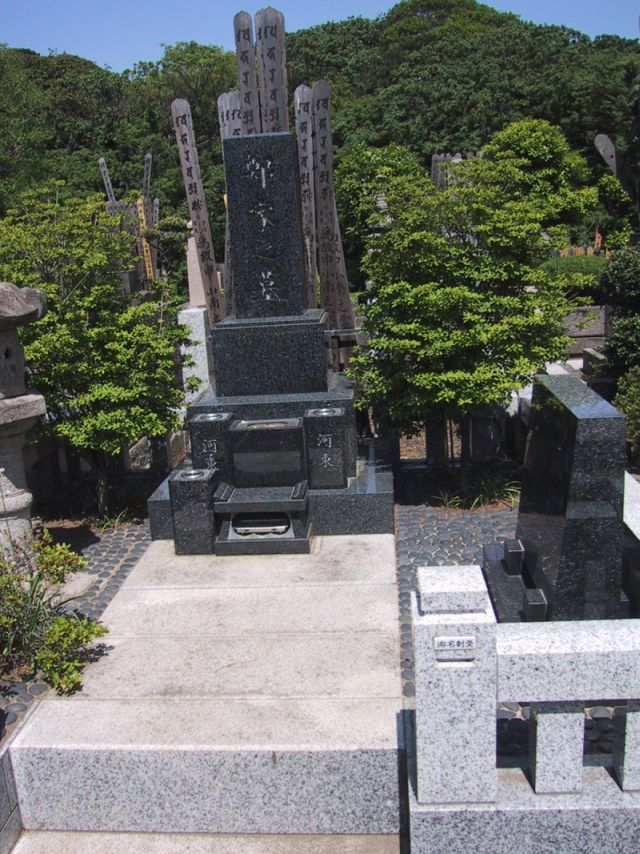
A typical Japanese grave

A typical Japanese grave is usually a family grave (墓, haka) consisting of a stone monument, with a place for flowers, incense, and water in front of the monument and a chamber or crypt underneath for the ashes.

The date of the erection of the grave and the name of the person who purchased it may be engraved on the side of the monument. The names of the deceased are often but not always engraved on the front of the monument. When a married person dies before his or her spouse, the name of the spouse may also be engraved on the stone, with the letters painted red. After the death and the burial of the spouse, the red ink is removed from the stone. This is usually done for financial reasons, as it is cheaper to engrave two names at the same time than to engrave the second name when the second spouse dies. It can also be seen as a sign that they are waiting to follow their spouse into the grave. However, this practice is less frequent nowadays. The names of the deceased may also be engraved on the left side, or on a separate stone in front of the grave. Often, the name is also written on a sotōba, a separate wooden board on a stand behind or next to the grave. These sotōba may be erected shortly after death, and new ones may be added at certain memorial services.

Some graves may also have a box for business cards, where friends and relatives visiting the grave can drop their business card, informing the caretakers of the grave of the respects the visitors have paid to the deceased.

The high prices of funeral plots, costing on average 2 million yen, have led to a new service of Grave Apartments (お墓のマンション, ohaka no manshon), where a locker-sized grave can be purchased for about 400,000 yen. Some of these may even include a touch screen showing a picture of the deceased, messages, a family tree, and other information. Due to the cost of land, a graveyard in Tokyo has recently been opened by a temple in floors 3 to 8 of a nine-story building, where the lower floors are for funeral ceremonies.

There are a number of cases where the ashes of deceased persons have been stolen from graves. The ashes of famous cartoonist Machiko Hasegawa and of the wife of real estate chairman Takichi Hayasaka were stolen for ransom. The ashes of famous novelist Yukio Mishima (1925–1970) were stolen in 1971 and the ashes of novelist Naoya Shiga were stolen in 1980. The ashes of the wife of the baseball player Sadaharu Oh went missing in December 2002.

=== Mourning and memorial services ===
Memorial services depend on local customs. Usually, there are a number of memorial services following the death - for example, daily for the first seven days, or a number of services within the first 49 days, or on the 7th, 49th and 100th day, depending on the local custom. Most commonly observed are the Buddhist service on the seventh day after death, shonanoka (初七日), and the 49th day, shijūkunichi (四十九日). In many traditions, the urn containing the ashes is interred in a ceremony called nōkotsu (納骨) on the 49th day, and the family stays in mourning until this.

After that, there is a memorial service on the Obon festival in honor of the dead. The festival may be held in the 1st year, sometimes in the 3rd and 5th, 7th and 13th years, and a number of times afterwards up to either the 39th or the 50th year. One popular sequence follows the days of the Thirteen Buddhas.

A picture of the deceased is also placed at or near the family altar in the household. Also, in the first year after death, no traditional New Year's Day Postcard is sent or received. The friends and relatives have to be informed of this beforehand so as not to send a card.

== Japanese funeral industry ==
The average cost of a Japanese funeral is about 2.31 million yen (US$25,000) according to a 2008 study by the Japan Consumers Association. This cost includes services such as 401,000 yen for catering to attendants and 549,000 yen for services of the priest. Overall, the industry has a revenue of about 1.5 trillion yen with about 45,000 funeral homes. In 2004, 1.1 million Japanese died (2003: 1.0 million), a number that is expected to rise in the future due to the increase of the average age in Japan; see demographics of Japan. Funeral Business Monthly estimates that there will be 1.7 million deaths by 2035, and revenue of 2 trillion yen in 2040.

Recently there have been some changes in the funeral industry, and some funeral homes offer more competitive and transparent pricing than a standard funeral provider. These offer funerals starting at about 200,000 yen, a fraction of the regular overpriced services, and lists the different options and prices to choose from a la carte. Many of these new funeral homes are started by non-Japanese nationals. Also, recently hotels with a decreasing income due to a decrease in weddings have started to offer funeral services. Overall, the level of competition is increasing. To stay competitive, the prices of regular funeral homes are also decreasing over time. Another recent introduction are services where a person can choose his or her funeral service before death and pays a monthly fee (e.g. 10,000 yen) to cover all costs of the funeral.

== History ==
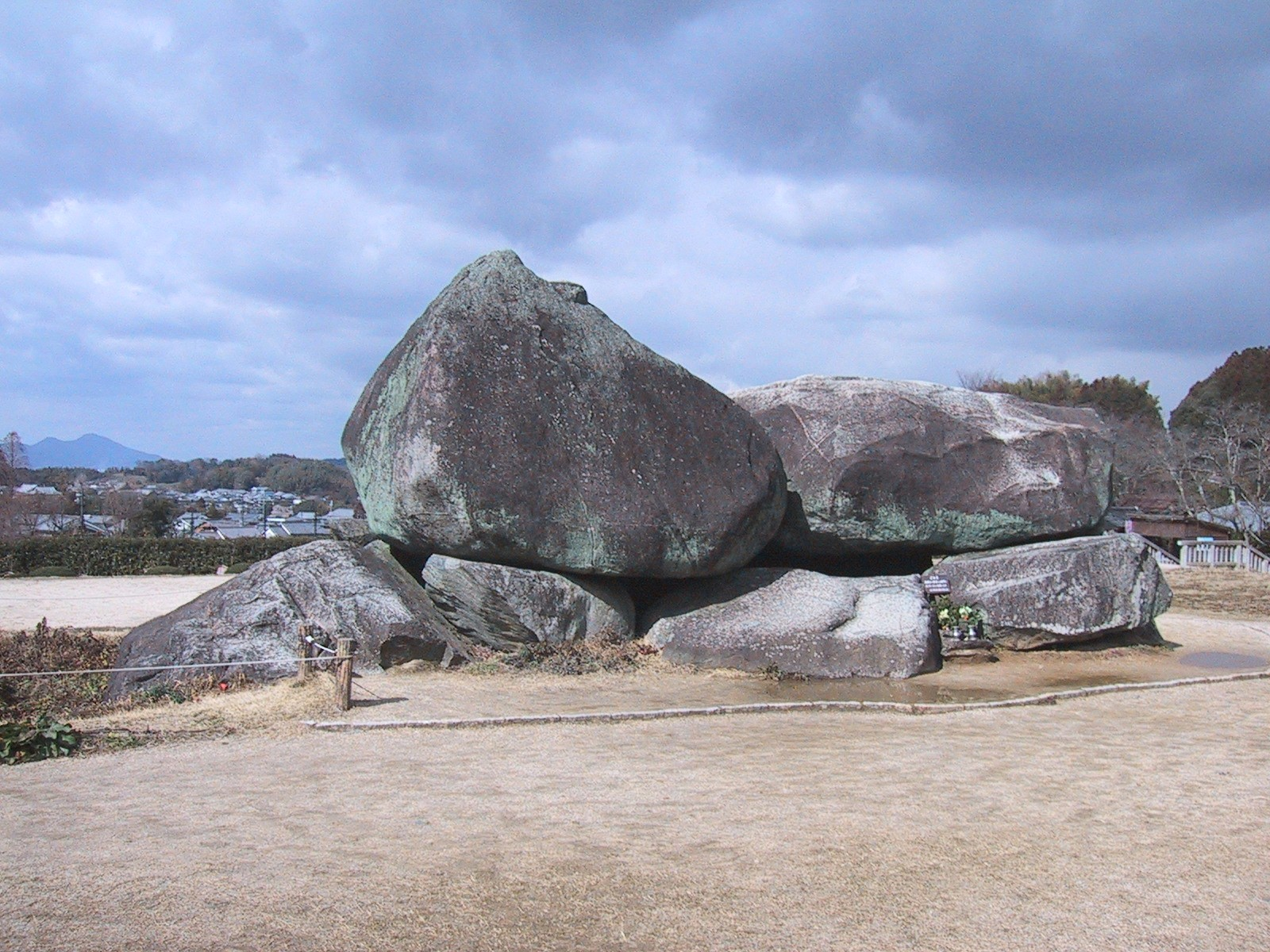
The Ishibutai Kofun in Asuka, Nara, a partially uncovered Kofun

Throughout Japanese history, famous leaders have often been buried in tombs. The oldest known burial chamber was built between 220 and 230 CE in Sakurai, Nara Prefecture, and called the Hokenoyama tomb. The tomb is 80 m long, and the chamber is 7 m long and 2.7 m wide, and contained a coffin 5 m long and 1 m wide. It is not known exactly who is buried there, but it is presumed to be a powerful local leader.

Around 300, the use of burial mounds for important leaders became more frequent. Japan developed its unique keyhole-shaped burial mounds, which are called Kofun (古墳 - the word is used for burial mounds of all shapes), and the period from 250 to 538 is called the Kofun period. Although 50 years ago it was believed that these mounds had initially been influenced by burial mounds in China via the Korean peninsula, Yayoi-period mounds are generally regarded as their predecessors. It is now believed that burial mounds of Korea built in the 5th and 6th centuries may have been influenced by the kofun of Japan.

There are numerous burial mounds within the geographical range of ancient Yamato-culture, most of which have keyhole-shaped outlines and which measure up to 400 m. The largest is the tomb of Emperor Nintoku in Sakai near Osaka, with a length of 486 m. and covering an area of 300,000 square meters. They are usually surrounded by moats, unless they are constructed on hills. The round halves of these burial mounds contain burial chambers. In the 6th century, round and square burial mounds came into use. The use of burial mounds is believed to have gradually stopped either with the introduction of Buddhism in Japan in the sixth century AD or with the establishment of the capital in Nara by Empress Genmei in 710. Instead, family tombs were constructed with passages that allow additional burials of relatives. Traditionally, the handling of deceased was considered unclean business and was usually done by Burakumin.

=== Medieval Sōtō Zen funerals ===
Japanese Buddhist funerals, which make up the vast majority of Japanese funerals today, are generally performed in what was historically the Sōtō Zen style, although today the Sōtō funerary rites have come to define the standard funeral format by most of the other Japanese Buddhist schools. Japanese Zen funeral rites came directly from Chinese Chan funeral rites, which were detailed in the Chanyuan Qinggui (禪院清規, “the pure regulations of the Zen monastery”). The major difference between the earlier Chinese Chan funerals and Japanese Sōtō Zen funerals was that early Japanese monks made no distinction between a monastic funeral for an abbot and the funeral service for a layperson. The first Japanese laypeople to receive Zen funerals were among the ruling elite who sponsored the activities of Zen institutions. One early example of this is the Regent Hōjō Tokimune, who received monastic funeral rites in 1284 at the hands of Chinese monk Wuxue Zuyan. Zen historian Martin Collcutt asserts that “one means by which Zen monks extended their influence in society was by the conduct of funeral services for important patrons.” By the medieval Sōtō period, only a small percentage of the funeral sermons recorded were delivered for members of the monastic order.

The progressive changes in Sōtō Zen funeral rites were not enacted by its founder, Dōgen, but came about years later when Zen master Keizan encouraged Zen monks to go out into the countryside and perform funeral services for the laity. Although Dōgen was the first to implement many aspects of Chinese Chan monastic codes in Japan, his gogoku doesn't contain any funeral sermons. At this point in Japanese history, different schools of Zen were in competition for followers, and they were “more conscious than ever before of the necessity of making available to the laity such rites as funeral services and ancestor worship.” Keizan's inclusive attitudes toward funerals resulted in the building of many temples in rural areas and the gradual expansion of the Sōtō order throughout Japan.

The funeral service that became popular for the Japanese laity in the medieval period was essentially the Chinese Chan service specified for the ordinary monk. The most important phases of this type of Zen funeral were: posthumous ordination, the sermon at the side of the corpse, the circumambulation of the coffin around the cremation ground, and the lighting of the funeral pyre. For a layperson, the posthumous ordination part of the ritual was the most vital, because without ordaining the deceased as a Zen monk, the other funeral rites could not be performed, since Zen funeral rites did not previously exist for laypeople, but only for monks. Once posthumous ordination of the laity was accepted by the Sōtō school, lay funeral practices became possible; today, death rituals mark the central practice at Sōtō Zen parish temples. This practice was one of the first few elements of Sōtō Zen that was standardized by the early Tokugawa period. Since the popularization of Sōtō Zen in medieval Japan, Sōtō Zen funeral practices have been a significant point of contact between the monks and laity, and continue to play an important role in lay religious life today.

=== Today ===
Until the early 20th century most bodies were buried and cremation was limited to the wealthy. Cremation became more common after World War II due to its efficiency and cleanliness; in fiscal 2009, 99.9% of Japanese bodies were cremated, and some local governments ban burials.

In a break of tradition from the early Edo period to align with modernity, it has been decided that Emperor Akihito and Empress Michiko will be cremated after their death instead of having ritual burials.

== Films ==
- The Funeral, a film by Juzo Itami, depicts a Japanese family going through the traditional funeral rituals upon death of one of their relatives.
- Departures, a 2008 film by Yōjirō Takita, tells a story of an out of work cellist who answers an employment advertisement for a funeral home.

== See also ==
- Emperor of Japan#Burial traditions
- Funeral (Buddhism)
- Japanese wedding
- Jarāmaraṇa
- Seppuku
