= Internal sin =

Sin committed by the inner activity of the mind

Internal sin, in Christianity, is the idea that sin may be committed not only by outward deeds but also by the inner activity of the mind, quite apart from any external manifestation. The concept of heresy existed earlier, but the Reformation's alarms received new emphasis at the Council of Trent (Session XIV, chapter. v). The session, while reiterating that all mortal sins must be confessed, singled out the unspoken ones that "sometimes more grievously wound the soul and are more dangerous than sins which are openly committed".

Three kinds of internal sin are usually distinguished by Catholics:

- delectatio morosa, the pleasure taken in a sinful thought or imagination even without desiring it;
- gaudium, dwelling with complacency on sins already committed;
- desiderium, the desire for what is sinful.

== Biblical quotes ==
- Matthew 5:28 But I tell you that anyone who looks at a woman lustfully has already committed adultery with her in his heart.
- Romans 6:12 Therefore do not let sin reign in your mortal body so that you obey its evil desires.

== See also ==
- Cathar
- Inquisition
- Orthodoxy
