= Kegare =

Japanese term for a state of defilement

Kegare (穢れ・汚れ, uncleanness, defilement) is the Japanese term for a state of pollution and defilement, important particularly in Shinto as a religious term. Typical causes of kegare are the contact with any form of death, childbirth (for both parents), disease, and menstruation. In Shintoism this condition is believed to be remedied through purification rites called misogi and harae. Kegare is seen to have an adverse impact not only on the person directly affected, but also on the community they belong to.

Kegare is related, but not a form of tsumi (taboo violation, such as, among others, rape), which needs to be remedied by the person responsible. Kegare is not a form of moral judgment, but rather a spontaneous reaction to amoral natural forces. Whether the defiling was caused by a deliberate act, as for example in the case of a crime, or by an external event, such as illness or death, is secondary. It is therefore not an equivalent of sin.

== Death as a source of kegare ==
The concept of kegare from death still has considerable force within Japanese society, even during Buddhist funerals. Death and everything having to do with it are seen as a primary source of defilement.

This is why, after the death of one of its members, a family will not send to friends and relatives the usual postcards with seasonal greetings during summer and winter, replacing them with letters of excuses. Those who attend a Buddhist funeral receive a small bag of salt to purify themselves before they return to their homes, in order to avoid bringing kegare to their families.

The family's kami must be protected as much as possible from contact with death, blood, and disease. A still common consequence of this is the habit to give up the traditional New Year visit (hatsumōde) to a Shinto shrine if a death in the family has occurred within the last year.

Shinto priests are expected to pay particular attention to avoid this kind of kegare, and must be careful to deal correctly with death and disease.

Bernard Scheid argues that given how important dealing with death is in religion, this strong death taboo cannot have been part of kami worship from the beginning. He argues that the exclusion of death from religious rites became for the first time possible when another religion, Buddhism, could take charge of it.

== See also ==
- The Glossary of Shinto
- Harae
- Karma (see bad karma).
- Tumah and taharah, - similar concepts of 'spiritual impurity' in Jewish religious law.
- Miasma – the concept of 'defilement', 'spiritual pollution' or 'blood guilt' in ancient Greece.
- Sacred–profane dichotomy
- Tsumi
