= Harae =

Shinto purification ritual

Harae or harai (祓 or 祓い) is the general term for ritual purification in Shinto. Harae is one of four essential elements involved in a Shinto ceremony. The purpose is the purification of pollution or sins (tsumi) and uncleanness (kegare). These concepts include bad luck and disease as well as guilt in the English sense.

Harae is often described as purification, but it is also known as an exorcism to be done before worship. Harae often involves symbolic washing with water, or having a Shinto priest shake a large paper shaker called ōnusa or haraegushi over the object of purification. People, places, and objects can all be the object of harae.

== History ==
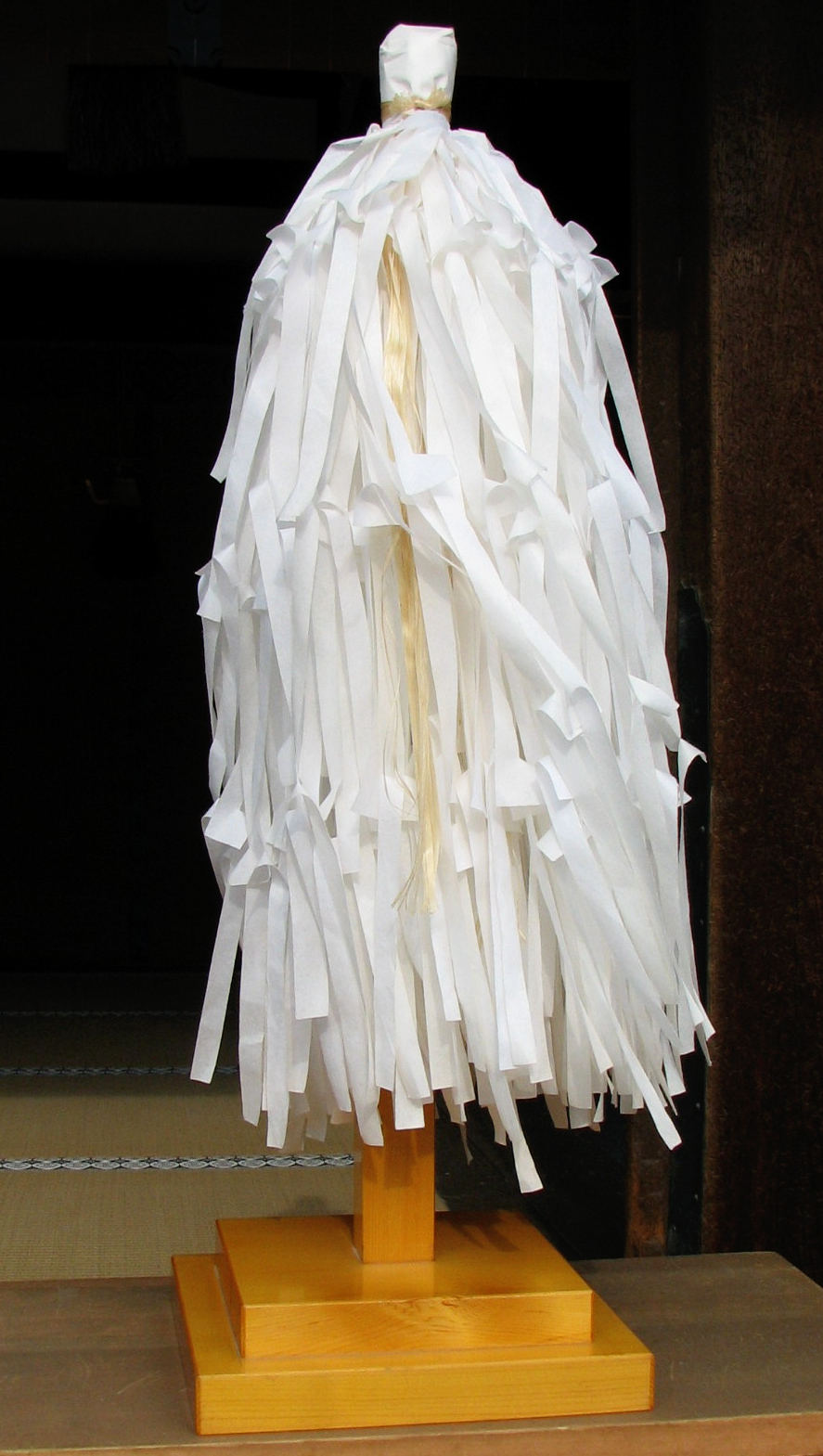
An ōnusa, which is used in certain types of harae.

Harae stems from the myth of Susano-o, the brother of the Sun goddess Amaterasu. According to the myth, while Amaterasu was supervising the weaving of the garments of the gods in the pure weaving hall, Susano-o broke through the roof and let fall a heavenly horse which had been flayed. This startled one of her attendants who, in her agitation, accidentally killed herself with the loom's shuttle. Amaterasu fled to the heavenly cave Ama-no-Iwato. Susano-o was subsequently expelled from heaven and Amaterasu's sovereignty resumed. The traditional Shinto purification ritual harae is represented when Susano-o is removed from heaven.

== Practice ==
There are various ways in which harae is practiced. At the Ise Grand Shrine, "the holiest of all Shinto shrines", wooden charms named ō-harai, another name for harae or harai, are hung all over the shrine.

In all Shinto religious ceremonies, harae is performed in the beginning of the ritual to cleanse any evil, pollution or sins away before anyone gives offerings to the kami. Often, water and salt are used for the ceremonies to rinse hands and the face, as well as the shrine before it is prepared with offerings of goods and food. Then the priest, along with the rest of the participants of the ritual chant a solemn liturgy before the assistant priest purifies the offerings using a wand called haraigushi.

Another method used to perform harae is misogi, in which a participant stands under a cold waterfall while chanting a liturgy. Misogi (禊) is said to be done on the 11th day of the month, including the winter months at the Tsubaki Grand Shrine. As both are related they are collectively referred to as Misogiharae (禊祓).

Ōharae is another method performed as a cleansing ritual to cleanse a large group of people. This ritual is practiced mostly in June and December to purify the nation, as well as after a disaster occurs. The practice is also performed at the year-end festival and also before major national festivals. The Jingiryō distinguishes two forms of ōharae: a regular rite performed twice yearly by the emperor, all court officials, and their families, and an ad hoc rite performed in the provinces whenever deemed necessary. Ōharae was also conducted at court whenever an offense had been committed, as well as on the occasion of major religious events such as the Daijō sai, the bokujō divination, and the purification (gunkō) of an itsuki no miko (an unmarried imperial princess); in some cases, whoever had committed an offense against a kami was required to make an offering as penance.

Shubatsu (修祓), a cleansing ritual performed by sprinkling salt, is another practice of the Shinto religion. Salt is used as a purifier by placing small piles in front of restaurants, known as morijio (盛り塩; pile of salt) or shiobana (塩花; salt flowers), for the two-fold purposes of warding off evil and attracting patrons. In addition, sprinkling salt over a person after attending a funeral is also practiced commonly in the Shinto religion. Another example of this cleansing ritual is to sprinkle water at the gate of one's home, both in the morning and evening. A significant and visible form of this ritual is when sumo wrestlers sprinkle salt around the fighting ring before a match, to purify the area.

== See also ==
- Consecration
- Glossary of Shinto for an explanation of terms concerning Japanese Shinto, Shinto art, and Shinto shrine architecture.
- Ōharae
