= Tsumi =

Japanese religious term

Tsumi (罪) is a Japanese word that indicates the violation of legal, social or religious rules. It is most often used in the religious and moral sense. Originally, the word indicated a divine punishment due to the violation of a divine taboo through evil deeds, defilement (kegare) or disasters. When translated in English as "sin", the term covers therefore only one of the three meanings of the Japanese word.

1. Evil deeds
2. Kegare
3. Disasters

== History ==
The term evolved to its present form as a contraction of tsutsumu (障む・恙む, to hinder, be hindered, to have an accident, to have some trouble), a verb which very generally indicated the occurrence of a negative event. In ancient Japan the word thus indicated not only crimes and other forbidden human actions, but also diseases, disasters, pollution, ugliness and any other unpleasant object or fact.

The Engishiki, a 927 AD Japanese book of laws and regulations, for example, distinguishes two kinds of tsumi, the Amatsutsumi (天津罪, heaven tsumi) and the kunitsutsumi (国津罪, land tsumi). The first category deals with infractions against property, the second mainly with infractions against people. Some of the tsumi have to do with disease and natural disasters, and are not therefore sins in the modern sense, but order perturbations (kegare) which had to be dealt with and solved by the person or persons concerned in certain ways, for example through purification rites called harae.

== See also ==
- Harae
- Kegare
