= Family tree of Japanese deities =

This is a family tree of Japanese deities. It covers early emperors until Emperor Ojin, the first definitively known historical emperor, see family tree of Japanese monarchs for a continuation of the royal line into historical times.

== Key ==
- Pink is female.
- Blue is male.
- Grey means other or unknown.
- Clans, families, people groups are in green.
- Vital figures are in **bold** text.

== Family tree ==
**SHINTO**; **DEITIES** (legendary genealogy)
Ame-no-Minakanushi
Takamimusubi
Kamimusubi
Kuni-no-Tokotachi
Umashiashikabihikoji
Amenotokotachi
Kuni-no-Tokotachi
Toyokumono
Uhijini	Suhijini
Tsunugui	Ikugui
Otonoji	Otonobe
Omodaru	Ayakashikone
Izanagi	Izanami
Wakumusubi	Mizuhanome	Yakusanoikazuchi (eight thunder deities)	**Raijin**	**Fūjin**	Haniyasu-hiko	Haniyasu-hime
**Tsukuyomi**
Toyouke	Raitaro
Nakisawame
**Amaterasu**	Ōyamatsumi	Kaya-no-hime	**Susanoo**	**Ebisu**	Ukemochi	Kagutsuchi
Eight unknown deities	Takiribime	Ichikishimahime	Tagitsuhime	Kuraokami	Futsunushi	Amatsumikaboshi	**Takemikazuchi**
Kamuōichihime
Ōtoshi	Ukanomitama
Oyamakui	Ashinazuchi	Tenazuchi	Konohanachiruhime	Iwanagahime
Futodama	Takuhadachiji-hime	Ame no Oshihomimi	Ame-no-hohi	Amatsuhikone	Kumanokusubi	Ikutsuhikone	Kushinadahime	unnamed deities
Kamotaketsunumi no Mikoto
Watatsumi
Inbe clan	Nigihayahi	Ninigi	Konohana; Sakuyahime	Haji clan	Izumo priests (Izumo clan)
Utsushihikanasaku	Yashimajinumi
Mononobe clan	Tamanoya	Hoderi (Umisachi-hiko)	Hohodemi (Hoori)	Toyotama -hime	Azumi people	Hikawahime	Fuha-no-Mojikunusunu
Fukabuchi-no-Mizuyarehana	Ame-no-Tsudoechine	Funozuno
Sashikuni Okami	Omizunu	Futemimi
Sashikuniwakahime	Ame-no-Fuyukinu
son or 6th-generation descendant
Shinabe clan	Hayato people	Ugayafu -kiaezu	Tamayori -hime	Ōkuninushi (Ōnamuchi)	Nunakawahime	Ame-no-Koyane
Kamo clan	Hosuseri	Kotoshironushi	Tamakushi-hime	Ame-no-Oshikumone (Nakatomi clan progenitor)	Susa Clan (clan of priests at Susa Shrine)	Takeminakata	Yasakatome
**JAPANESE**; **EMPERORS**
Inahi	Itsuse no Mikoto	Ahiratsu-hime	711–585 BC **Jimmu**; 660–585 BC^{(1)}	Himetataraisuzu-hime	Kamo no Okimi	Amenotaneko
Miwa clan
Kisumimi	Tagishimimi	632–549 BC **Suizei**; 581–549 BC^{(2)}	Isuzuyori-hime	Hikoyai	Kamuyaimimi d.577 BC	Usami no Mikoto
567–511 BC **Annei**; 549–511 BC^{(3)}	Ikisomimi no mikoto	Mishokutsuomi no Mikoto
553–477 BC **Itoku**; 510–476 BC^{(4)}	Amonotoyototsu-hime	Ikatsuomikoto
Yosotarashi-hime	501–393 BC **Kōshō**; 475–393 BC^{(5)}	Nashitomi
Ametarashihiko kunioshihito	427–291 BC **Kōan**; 392–291 BC^{(6)}	Kamikikikatsu
Oshihime	342–215 BC **Kōrei**; 290–215 BC^{(7)}	Kushiukameshi no Mikoto
ancestry
Ikagashikome (Note: There are two ways this name is transcribed: "Ika-gashiko-me" is used by Tsutomu Ujiya, while "Ika-shiko-me" is used by William George Aston.)	273–158 BC **Kōgen**; 214–158 BC^{(8)}	Kibitsuhiko	Yamatototohimomoso-hime	Kuninazu no oukashima
Hikofutsuoshi no Makoto	208–98 BC **Kaika**; 157–98 BC^{(9)}	Omikiyama no Mikoto
148–30 BC **Sujin**; 97–30 BC^{(10)}	Hikoimasu	Nakatomi no Ikatsu
son or grandson
Takenouchi no Sukune	Yasaka Iribiko	69 BC–70 AD **Suinin**; 29 BC–70 AD^{(11)}	Yamashiro no Ōtsutsuki; Mawaka	O-o-obase-no-mikoto (大小橋命)
Yasaka Iribime	13 BC–130 AD **Keikō**; 71–130^{(12)}	Kanime Ikazuchi	Nakatomi no Amahisa-no-kimi
Soga no Ishikawa; Sukune (Soga clan progenitor)	84–190 **Seimu**; 131–191^{(13)}	Ioki Iribiko	Yamato Takeru	Futaji Irihime	Okinaga no Sukune	Nakatomi no Abiko
Soga no Machi	Homuda; Mawaka	149–200 **Chūai**; 192–200^{(14)}	**Jingū**; 200–270	Nakatomi no Mahito
Nakatsuhime	201–310 **Ōjin**; 270–310^{(15)}	Nakatomi no Kamako

== See also ==
- Family tree of Japanese monarchs
- List of Japanese deities
- Kamiumi
