= Family tree of Japanese monarchs =

The following is a family tree of the emperors of Japan, from the legendary Emperor Jimmu to the present monarch, Naruhito.

Modern scholars have come to question the existence of at least the first nine emperors; Kōgen's descendant, Emperor Sujin (98 BC – 30 BC?), is the first for whom many agree that he might have actually existed. These monarchs are regarded by historians as "legendary emperors", since there is insufficient material available for further verification and study.

The reign of Emperor Kinmei (c. 509–571 AD), the 29th emperor, is the first for which the contemporary historiography is able to assign verifiable dates. However, the conventionally accepted names and dates of the early emperors were not to be confirmed as "traditional" until the reign of Emperor Kanmu (737–806), the 50th sovereign of the imperial dynasty.

This family tree emphasizes the medieval to modern history of the Japanese royal family. For more info on the genealogies of earlier figures see family tree of Japanese deities.

== Family tree ==
Female Male genderless or unknown gender Group of people

Family tree of Japanese monarchs

SHINTO DEITIES/GOD/KAMI (legendary genealogy)
Takamimusubi	Izanagi	Izanami	Kamimusubi
Amaterasu	Ōyamatsumi	Susanoo
Futodama	Takuhadachiji-hime	Ame no Oshihomimi	Ame-no-hohi
Watatsumi
Haji clan	Izumo priests (Izumo clan)
Imbe clan	Nigihayahi	Ninigi	Konohana Sakuyahime
Utsushihikanasaku	Furutama-no-mikoto
Mononobe clan	Tamanoya	Hoderi (Umisachi-hiko)	Hohodemi (Hoori)	Toyotama-hime	Azumi people	（Owari Kuni-no-miyatsuko, Yamato no Kuni no Miyatsuko)
son or 6th-generation descendant
Shinabe clan	Hayato people	Ugayafu-kiaezu	Tamayori-hime	Ōkuninushi (Ōnamuchi)	Nunakawahime	Ame-no-Koyane
Hosuseri	Kotoshironushi	Tamakushi-hime	Ame no oshikumo no mikoto (Nakatomi clan progenitor)	Takeminakata	Yasakatome	Susa Clan (clan of priests at Susa Shrine)
JAPANESE; EMPERORS
Inahi no Mikoto	Itsuse no Mikoto	Ahiratsu-hime	711–585 BC Jimmu r. 660–585^{(1)}	Himetataraisuzu-hime	Miwa clan	Amenotaneko
Kisumimi	Tagishimimi	632–549 BC Suizei r. 581–549^{(2)}	Isuzuyori-hime	Hikoyai	Kamuyaimimi d. 577 BC	Usami no Mikoto
567–511 BC Annei r. 549–511^{(3)}	Ikisomimi no mikoto	Mishokutsuomi no Mikoto
553–477 BC Itoku r. 510–476^{(4)}	Amonotoyototsu-hime	Ikatsuomikoto
Yosotarashi-hime	501–393 BC Kōshō r. 475–393^{(5)}	Nashitomi
Ametarashihiko kunioshihito	427–291 BC Kōan r. 392–291^{(6)}	Kamikikikatsu
Oshihime	342–215 BC Kōrei r. 290–215^{(7)}	Kushiukameshi no Mikoto
ancestry
Ikagashikome (Note: There are two ways this name is transcribed: "Ika-gashiko-me" is used by Tsutomu Ujiya, while "Ika-shiko-me" is used by William George Aston.)	273–158 BC Kōgen r. 214–158^{(8)}	Kibitsuhiko	Yamatototohimomoso-hime	Kuninazu no oukashima
Hikofutsuoshi no Makoto	208–98 BC Kaika r. 157–98^{(9)}	Omikiyama no Mikoto
148–30 BC Sujin r. 97–30^{(10)}	Hikoimasu	Nakatomi no Ikatsu
son or grandson
Takenouchi no Sukune	Yasaka Iribiko	69 BC–70 AD Suinin r. 29 BC – 70 AD^{(11)}	Yamashiro no Ōtsutsuki Mawaka	O-o-obase-no-mikoto (大小橋命)
Yasaka Iribime	13 BC–130 AD Keikō r. 71–130^{(12)}	Kanime Ikazuchi	Nakatomi no Amahisa-no-kimi
Soga no Ishikawa Sukune (Soga clan progenitor)	84–190 Seimu r. 131–191^{(13)}	Ioki Iribiko	Yamato Takeru	Futaji Irihime	Okinaga no Sukune	Nakatomi no Abiko
Soga no Machi	Homuda Mawaka	149–200 Chūai r. 192–200^{(14)}	Jingū; 200–270	Nakatomi no Mahito
Nakatsuhime	201–310 Ōjin r. 270–310^{(15)}	Nakatomi no Kamako
Soga no Karako	Princess Iwa	290–399 Nintoku r. 313–399^{(16)}	Wakanuke no Futamata	Nakatomi no Kuroda
Richū r. 400–405^{(17)}	Hanzei r. 406–410^{(18)}	Ingyō r. 411–453^{(19)}	Oshisaka no Hime	Ohohoto no Ōkimi
Soga no Koma	Ichinobe no Oshiwa	Ankō r. 453–456^{(20)}	418–479 Yūryaku r. 456–479^{(21)}	Ohi no Ōkimi
449–487 Kenzō r. 484–487^{(23)}	Ninken r. 488–498^{(24)}	Seinei r. 480–484^{(22)}	Ushi no Ōkimi
489–507 Buretsu r. 498–507^{(25)}	Tashiraka	Keitai r. 507–531^{(26)}
Soga no Iname; 506?–570	Tachibana	467–539 Senka r. 536–539^{(28)}	465–536 Ankan r. 531–536^{(27)}
Soga no Umako c.551–626	Nakatomi no Tokiwa	Ishi-Hime	509–571 Kinmei r. 539–571^{(29)}	Soga no Kitashihime	Soga no Oanenokimi
Hiro Hime ?–575	Unako no Otoshi	538–585 Bidatsu r. 572–585^{(30)}	554–628 Suiko r. 593–628^{(33)}	540–587 Yōmei r. 585–587^{(31)}	Anahobe no Hashihito	520–592 Sushun r. 587–592^{(32)}
Soga no Kuramaro	Nakatomi no Katanoko	Oshisako no Oe b. 556	Nukate Hime b. 570	Prince Sakurai; 560–587?	Prince Shōtoku; 574–622	Ōtomo no Koteko
Nakatomi no Mikeko	Chinu no Ōkimi	Kibi Hime
Soga no Murajiko; 611–664	614–669; Fujiwara no Kamatari (Fujiwara clan progenitor); 669	593–641 Jomei r. 629–641^{(34)}	594–661 Kōgyoku r. 642–645^{(35)} Saimei r. 654–661^{(37)}	596–654 Kōtoku r. 645–654^{(36)}
Prince Nanba	Soga no Masako	Fujiwara no Fuhito; 659–720	626–671 Tenji r. 661–671^{(38)}	Yamato Hime no Ōkimi
Prince Kurikuma	648–672 Kōbun r. 672–672^{(39)}	Princess Tōchi; 648/653–678	645–703 Jitō r. 686–697^{(41)}	631–686 Tenmu r. 672–686^{(40)}
Prince Minu	Fujiwara no Fusasaki; 681–737	Shiki c.668–716	660–721 Genmei r. 707–715^{(43)}	Kusakabe; 662–689	Prince Toneri; 676–735
Tachibana no Michiyo (Tachibana clan progenitor)	Fujiwara no Miyako; 683–754	683–707 Monmu r. 697–707^{(42)}	683–748 Genshō r. 715–724^{(44)}	733–765 Junnin r. 758–764^{(47)}
Tachibana no Moroe	Fujiwara no Matate; 715–766	Empress Kōmyō; 701–760	701–756 Shōmu r. 724–749^{(45)}
Tachibana no Naramaro	718–770 Kōken r. 749–758^{(46)} Shōtoku r. 764–770^{(48)}	Princess Inoe (Ikami); 717–775	709–782 Kōnin r. 770–781^{(49)}	Takano no Niigasa c.720–790
Tachibana no Kiyotomo	Fujiwara no Uchimaro; 756–812	Sakahito; 754–829	Yamabe; 737–806 Kanmu r. 781–806^{(50)}	Fujiwara no Otomuro; 760–790
Fujiwara no Fuyutsugu; 775–826	Asahara; 779–817	Ate; 774–824 Heizei r. 806–809^{(51)}	Kamino; 786–842 Saga r. 809–823^{(52)}	Tachibana no Kachiko; 786–850	Princess Koshi; 789–809	Ōtomo; 786–840 Junna r. 823–833^{(53)}	Kazurawara Shinno
Fujiwara no Nagara; 802–856	Fujiwara no Yoshifusa; 804–872	Minamoto no Kiyohime; 810–856	Fujiwara no Nobuko; 809–871	Masara; 810–850 Ninmyō (Fukakusa) r. 833–850^{(54)}	Princess Seishi; 810–879	Takami Shinno
Fujiwara no Akirakeiko; 829–899	Michiyasu; 827–858 Montoku r. 850–858^{(55)}	Tokiyasu; 830–887 Kōkō r. 884–887^{(58)}	Taira no Takamochi (Taira clan progenitor)
Fujiwara no Mototsune; 836–891	Fujiwara no Takaiko; 842–910	Korehito; 850–880 Seiwa r. 858–876^{(56)}	Sadami; 867–931 Uda r. 887–897^{(59)}
Fujiwara no Tadahira; 880–949	Sadaakira; 869–949 Yōzei r. 876–884^{(57)}	Fujiwara no Onshi; 885–954	Atsuhito; 885–930 Daigo r. 897–930^{(60)}	Prince Atsumi; 893–967
Kōshi; 919–957	Fujiwara no Morosuke; 909–960
Fujiwara no Kinsue; 957–1029	Fujiwara no Koretada; 924–972	Yutaakira; 923–952 Suzaku r. 930–946^{(61)}	Fujiwara no Anshi; 927–964	Nariakira; 926–967 Murakami r. 946–967^{(62)}	Fujiwara no Kaneie; 929–990	Minamoto no Masanobu; 920–993
Fujiwara no Kaishi; 945–975	Norihira; 950–1011 Reizei r. 967–969^{(63)}	Princess Masako; 950–1000	Fujiwara no Chōshi c.954–982	Morihira; 959–991 En'yū r. 969–984^{(64)}	Fujiwara no Senshi; 962–1002	Fujiwara no Michinaga; 966–1028	Minamoto no Rinshi; 964–1053
Fujiwara no Sanenari; 975–1004	Morohada; 968–1008 Kazan r. 984–986^{(65)}	Fujiwara no Seishi; 972–1025	Iyasada; 976–1017 Sanjō r. 1011–1016^{(67)}	Fujiwara no Kenshi; 994–1027	Fujiwara no Shōshi; 988–1074	Kanehito; 980–1011 Ichijō r. 986–1011^{(66)}	Fujiwara no Teishi; 977–1001
Fujiwara no Kinnari	Princess Teishi; 1013–1094	Fujiwara no Genshi; 1016–1039	Atsunaga; 1009–1045 Go-Suzaku r. 1036–1045^{(69)}	Fujiwara no Kishi; 1007–1025	Atsuhira; 1008–1036 Go-Ichijō r. 1016–1036^{(68)}	Fujiwara no Ishi; 999–1036
Fujiwara Shigeko ?–1062	Takahito; 1034–1073 Go-Sanjō r. 1068–1073^{(71)}	Princess Kaoruko; 1029–1093	Chikahito; 1025–1068 Go-Reizei r. 1045–1068^{(70)}	Princess Akiko {Shōshi} 1027–1105	Fujiwara no Kanshi; 1021–1102	Fujiwara no Hiroko; 1036–1127
Fujiwara no Sanesue; 1035–1092	Sadahito; 1053–1129 Shirakawa r. 1073–1087^{(72)}	Fujiwara no Kenshi; 1057–1084
Fujiwara no Yorimichi	Fujiwara no Kinzane; 1053–1107	Fujiwara no Ishi; 1076–1103	Taruhito; 1079–1107 Horikawa r. 1087–1107^{(73)}	Princess Tokushi; 1060–1114	Princess Yasuko; 1076–1096
Fujiwara no Morozane	Fujiwara no Michisue; 1090–1128	Tokudaiji Saneyoshi; 1117–1173	Fujiwara no Nariko; 1117–1160	Munehito; 1096–1157 Toba r. 1107–1123^{(74)}	Fujiwara no Tamako; 1101–1145	Fujiwara no Yasuko; 1095–1156
Fujiwara no Moromichi	Fujiwara no Kinmichi; 1117–1173	Tokudaiji Kinyoshi; 1115–1161	Masahito; 1127–1192 Go-Shirakawa r. 1155–1158^{(77)}	Fujiwara no Kinshi; 1134–1209	Akihito; 1119–1164 Sutoku r. 1123–1142^{(75)}	Fujiwara no Kiyoko; 1121–1182	Taira no Kiyomori; 1118–1181
Fujiwara no Tadazane	Fujiwara no Sanemune; 1145–1214	Princess; Yoshiko; 1141–1176	Morihito; 1143–1165 Nijō r. 1158–1165^{(78)}	Fujiwara no Tashi; 1140–1202	Narihito; 1139–1155 Konoe r. 1142–1155^{(76)}	Fujiwara no Shimeko; 1131–1176	Norihito; 1161–1181 Takakura r. 1168–1180^{(80)}	Taira no Tokuko; 1155–1213
Fujiwara no Tadamichi	Saionji Kintsune; 1171–1244	Yorihito; 1164–1176 Rokujō r. 1165–1168^{(79)}	Fujiwara no Ikushi; 1146–1173	Takahura; 1180–1239 Go-Toba r. 1185–1198^{(82)}	Kujō Ninshi; 1173–1239	Prince Morisada; 1179－1223	Tokihito; 1178–1185 Antoku r. 1180–1185^{(81)}
Konoe Motozane	Tōin Saneo; 1219–1273	Saionji Saneuji; 1194–1269	Fujiwara no Reishi; 1185–1243	Tamehito; 1196–1231 Tsuchimikado r. 1198–1210^{(83)}	Morinari; 1197–1242 Juntoku r. 1210–1221^{(84)}	Fujiwara no Ritsushi; 1192–1248	Yutahito; 1212–1234 Go-Horikawa r. 1221–1232^{(86)}	Fujiwara no Shunshi; 1209–1233
Konoe Motomichi	Saionji Kisshi; 1225–1292	Kunihito; 1220–1272 Go-Saga r. 1242–1246^{(88)}	Kanenari; 1218–1234 Chūkyō r. 1221^{(85)}	Mitsuhito; 1231–1242 Shijō r. 1232–1242^{(87)}
Konoe Iezane	Tōin Inshi; 1246–1329	Hisahito; 1243–1304 Go-Fukakusa r. 1246–1260^{(89)}	Saionji (Fujiwara) no Kimiko; 1232–1304	Tōin no Saneko; 1245–1272	Tsunehito; 1249–1305 Kameyama r. 1260–1274^{(90)}	Fujiwara no Kishi; 1252–1318	Prince Munetaka; 1242–1274; Shōgun: 1252–1266
Konoe Kanetsune	Tōin Sueko; 1265–1336	Hirohito; 1265–1317 Fushimi r. 1287–1298^{(92)}	Prince Hisaaki; 1279–1308; Shōgun: 1289–1308	Reishi; 1270–1307	Yohito; 1267–1324 Go-Uda r. 1274–1287^{(91)}	Prince Koreyasu; 1264–1326; Shōgun: 1266–1289
Konoe Motohira	Tomihito; 1297–1348 Hanazono r. 1308–1318^{(95)}	Tanehito; 1288–1336 Go-Fushimi r. 1298–1301^{(93)}	Prince Morikuni; 1301–1333; Shōgun: 1308–1333	Takaharu; 1288–1339 Go-Daigo r. 1318–1339^{(96)}	Saionji Kishi; 1303–1333	Kuniharo; 1285–1308 Go-Nijō r. 1301–1308^{(94)}	Fujiwara no Kinshi; 1271–1342
Konoe Iemoto	Yutahito; 1322–1380 Kōmyō; 1336–1348	Kazuhito; 1313–1348 Kōgon; 1332–1334	Princess Junshi; 1311–1337	Noriyoshi; 1328–1368 Go-Murakami r. 1339–1368^{(97)}	Prince Moriyoshi; 1308–1335; Shōgun: 1333–1334	Prince Narinaga; 1326–1338/1344; Shōgun: 1334–1338	Prince Tsunenaga; 1324–1338	Prince Munenaga; 1311–c.1385	Prince Kaneyoshi c.1329–1383
Konoe Tsunehira	Okihito; 1334–1398 Sukō; 1348–1351	Iyahito; 1336–1374 Go-Kōgon; 1352–1371	Yutanari; 1343–1394 Chōkei r. 1368–1383^{(98)}	Hironari; 1347–1424 Go-Kameyama r. 1383–1392^{(99)}
Konoe Mototsugu	Yoshihito shinnō 1351–1416	Ohito; 1359–1393 Go-En'yū; 1371–1382	Key: Northern Pretender; Legitimate Emperor
Konoe Michitsugu	Sadafusa shinnō 1372–1456	Motohito; 1377–1433 Go-Komatsu; 1382–1392 r. 1392–1412^{(100)}
Konoe Kanetsugu	Mihito; 1401–1428 Shōkō r. 1412–1428^{(101)}
Konoe Tadatsugu; 1383–1454	Hikohito; 1419–1471 Go-Hanazono r. 1428–1464^{(102)}	Fushimi Sadatsune; 1426–1474
Konoe Fusatsugu	Fusahito; 1442–1500 Go-Tsuchimikado r. 1464–1500^{(103)}	Fushimi Kunitaka; 1456–1532
Konoe Masaie	Katsuhito; 1464–1526 Go-Kashiwabara r. 1500–1526^{(104)}	Fushimi Sadaatsu; 1488–1572
Hisamichi^{(15)} 1472–1544	Tomohito; 1497–1557 Go-Nara r. 1526–1557^{(105)}	Fushimi Kunisuke; 1513–1563
Taneie^{(16)} 1503–1566	Michihito; 1517–1593 Ōgimachi r. 1557–1586^{(106)}	Fushimi Kuninobu; 1566–1622
Tokugawa Ieyasu; 1543–1616; Shōgun: 1603–1605	Konoe Sakihisa	Prince Masahito; 1552–1586	Fushimi Sadakiyo; 1596–1654
Tokugawa Hidetada; 1579–1632; Shōgun: 1605–1623	Konoe Sakiko	Kazuhito; 1572–1617 Go-Yōzei r. 1586–1611^{(107)}	Fushimi Sadayuki; 1632–1694
Tokugawa Masako; 1607–1678	Kokohito; 1596–1680 Go-Mizunoo r. 1611–1629^{(108)}
Okiko; 1624–1696 Meishō r. 1629–1643^{(109)}	Tsuguhito; 1633–1654 Go-Kōmyō r. 1643–1654^{(110)}	Nagahito; 1638–1685 Go-Sai r. 1655–1663^{(111)}	Satohito; 1654–1732 Reigen r. 1663–1687^{(112)}	Takatsukasa Fusako; 1653–1712
Kujō; Sukezane; 1669–1729	Mashiko; 1669–1738	Asahito; 1675–1710 Higashiyama r. 1687–1709^{(113)}	Princess Yukiko; 1680–1720	Yoshiko; 1676–1707	Fushimi Kuninaga; 1676–1726
Kujō Yukinori; 1700–1728	Naohito shinnō 1704–1753	Yashuhito; 1702–1737 Nakamikado r. 1709–1735^{(114)}
Nijō Munemoto; 1727–1754	Teruhito; 1720–1750 Sakuramachi r. 1735–1747^{(115)}	Fushimi Sadatake; 1701–1754
Sukehito shinnō 1733–1794	Toohito; 1741–1762 Momozono r. 1747–1762^{(116)}	Toshiko; 1740–1813 Go-Sakuramachi r. 1762–1771^{(117)}
Nijō Harutaka; 1754–1826	Hidehito; 1758–1779 Go-Momozono r. 1771–1779^{(118)}	Fushimi Kuniyori; 1733–1802
Kajyūji Tadako; 1780–1843	Morohito; 1771–1840 Kōkaku r. 1780–1817^{(119)}	Princess Yoshiko; 1779–1846	Fushimi Sadayuki; 1776–1841
Kujō Hisatada; 1798–1871	Ayahito; 1800–1846 Ninkō r. 1817–1846^{(120)}	Ōgimachi Naoko; 1803–1856	Fushimi Kuniie; 1802–1872
Empress Dowager Eishō (Asako Kujō); 1835–1897	Osahito; 1831–1867 Kōmei r. 1846–1867^{(121)}	Nakayama Yoshiko; 1836–1907
Kujō Michitaka; 1839–1906	Yanagiwara Naruko; 1859–1943	Mutsuhito; 1852–1912 Meiji r. 1867–1912^{(122)}	Empress Dowager Shōken (Haruko Ichijō); 1849–1914	Kuni Asahiko; 1824–1891
Empress Teimei (Sadako Kujō); 1884–1951	Yoshihito; 1879–1926 Taishō r. 1912–1926^{(123)}	Kuni Kuniyoshi; 1873–1929	Toshiko, Princess Yasu; 1896–1978	Prince Naruhiko Higashikuni; 1887–1990	Prince Nashimoto Morimasa; 1874–1951	Gojong; 1852–1919; Emperor of Korea
Hirohito; 1901–1989 Shōwa r. 1926–1989^{(124)}	Empress Kōjun (Princess Nagako of Kuni); 1903–2000	Yi Bangja; 1901–1989; Crown Princess of Korea	Yi Un; 1897–1970; Crown Prince of Korea
Shigeko, Princess Teru; 1925–1961	Morihiro Higashikuni; 1916–1969	The Empress Emerita (Michiko Shōda) b. 1934	Akihito b. 1933 The Emperor Emeritus r. 1989–2019^{(125)}	Yi Ku; 1931–2005; Pretender of Korea
The Empress (Masako Owada) b. 1963	Naruhito b. 1960 The Emperor r. 2019–present^{(126)}	Crown Prince Akishino (Fumihito) b. 1965	Crown Princess Akishino (Kiko Kawashima) b. 1966

== See also ==
- Succession to the Japanese throne
- Family Tree of Japanese deities
- Fushimi-no-miya § Family Tree showing the family tree of the potentially future royal family if laws were changed
