= Tenson kōrin =

Japanese mythological event

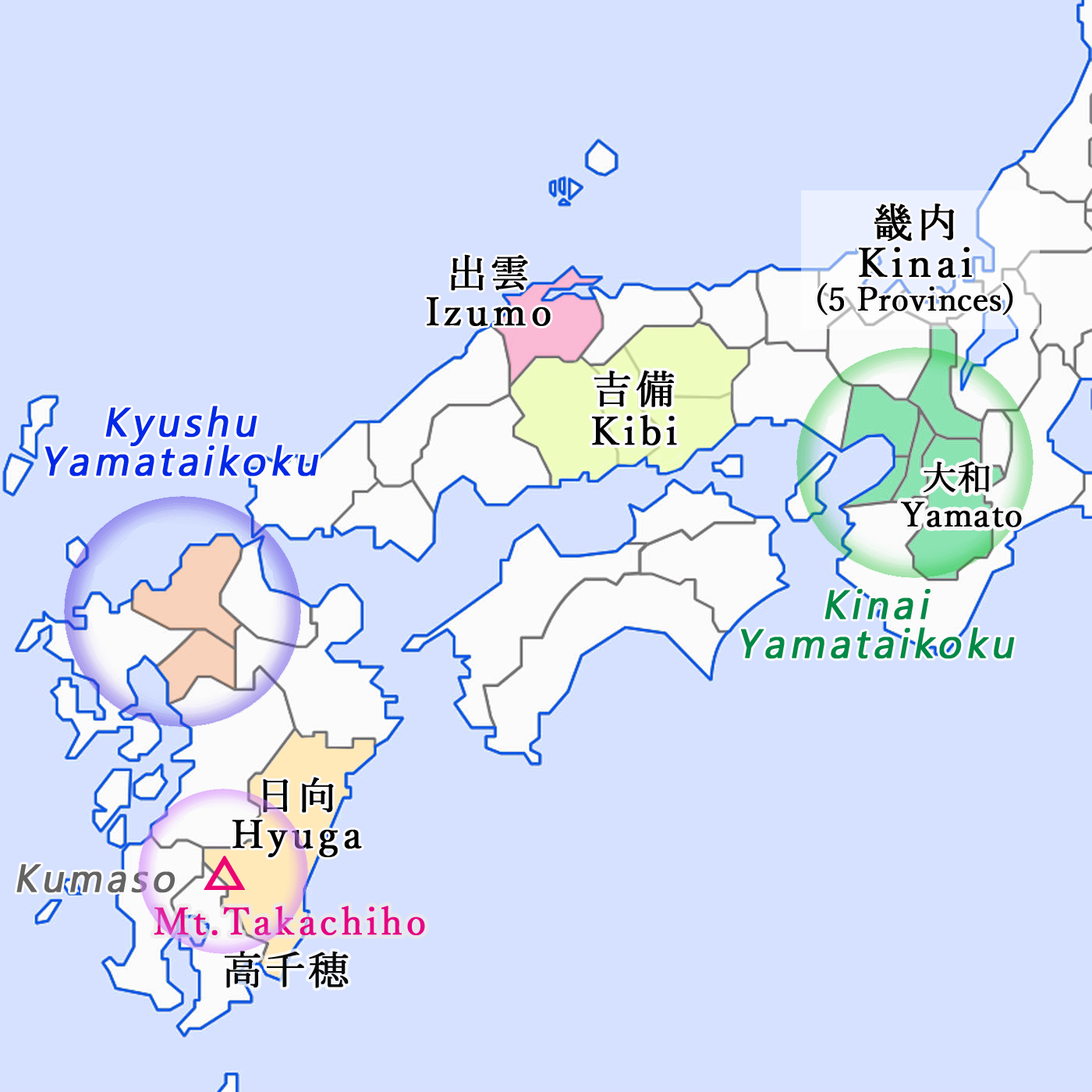
Location of Mt.Takachiho

In Japanese mythology, tenson kōrin (天孫降臨, literally "descent of the heavenly grandson") was the descent of Amaterasu and Takamimusubi's grandson Ninigi-no-Mikoto from Takamagahara to Ashihara no Nakatsukuni. According to legend, the location of the descent was at Mt. Takachiho in Kagoshima Prefecture. Following the tenson kōrin, Ninigi's son, Hoori, was born.

== Three generations of Hyuga ==
After the tenson kōrin there were the Three Generations of Hyuga until Jimmu's Eastern Expedition when the Imperial House of Japan was founded.

Amaterasu	Takamimusubi
Ame-no-oshihomimi	Takuhadachiji-hime	Ōyamatsumi
Ninigi-no-Mikoto （天孫）	Konohanasakuya-hime	Watatsumi
Hoderi	Hosuseri （海幸彦）	Hoori （山幸彦）	Toyotama-hime	Utsushihikanasaku	Furutama-no-mikoto
Tensori no Mikoto	Ugayafukiaezu	Tamayori-hime	Azumi people	（Owari clan Yamato clan)
Hayato people	Itsuse	Inahi	Mikeiri	Jimmu	Ahiratsu-hime
Imperial House of Japan	Tagishimimi

- Red background is female.
- Green background means groups
- Bold letters are three generations of Hyuga.

== Alternate tellings ==
In some versions of this story, more gods came down from heaven besides Ninigi-no-Mikoto.
