= Ninigi-no-Mikoto =

Shinto god

Ninigi
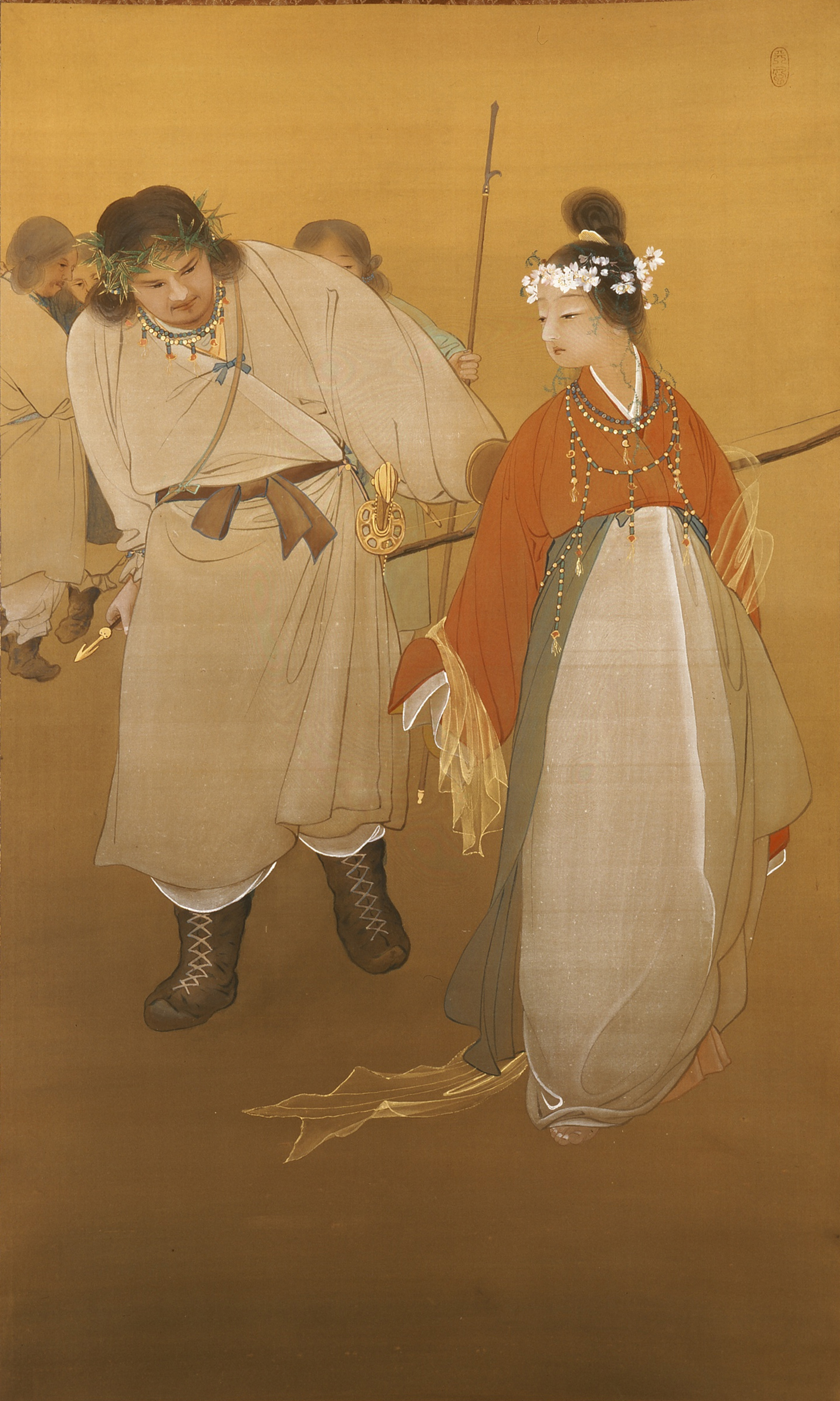
- Ninigi courting Sakuyahime, by Rinkyo, 1906

Genealogy
- Parents: Ame no Oshihomimi (father); Takuhadachijihime (mother)
- Siblings: Nigihayahi (brother)
- Consorts: Sakuyahime (wife)
- Children: Hoderi; Hosuseri; Hoori

Ninigi (瓊瓊杵) or Ninigi-no-Mikoto (瓊瓊杵尊), is a god in Japanese mythology. (no-Mikoto here is an honorific title applied to the names of Japanese gods; Ninigi is the specific god's name.) Grandson of the sun goddess Amaterasu, Ninigi is regarded according to Japanese mythology as the great-grandfather of Japan’s first emperor, Emperor Jimmu. The three sacred treasures brought with Ninigi from Heaven and divine ancestry established the Japanese Imperial Family. The Encyclopedia of Shinto states that the three generations of kami starting with Ninigi are sometimes referred to as the Three Generations of Hyūga: they are said to represent a transitional period between the heavenly kami and the first emperor.

== Name and etymology ==
Ninigi-no-Mikoto (瓊瓊杵尊) means "The Great God Ninigi". Another name of his is Ame-nigishi-kuni-nigishi-amatsuhiko-hiko-ho-no-ninigi-no-Mikoto (天邇岐志国邇岐志天津日高日子番能邇邇芸命) or "The Great God Ninigi, of the Imperial State, The Child of the Sun of Many Talents". Ninigi is speculated to be translated as "beloved jeweled mallet".

== Myths ==
=== Birth ===
Ninigi was born from Ame no Oshihomimi and Takuhadachijihime. Takamimusubi treated him with special affection and nurtured him with great regard.

==== Sent to rule ====
Depending on the version Amaterasu sends Ninigi to rule either after his father refuses the offer, after several failures, or to replace Ōkuninushi after his troubled rule.

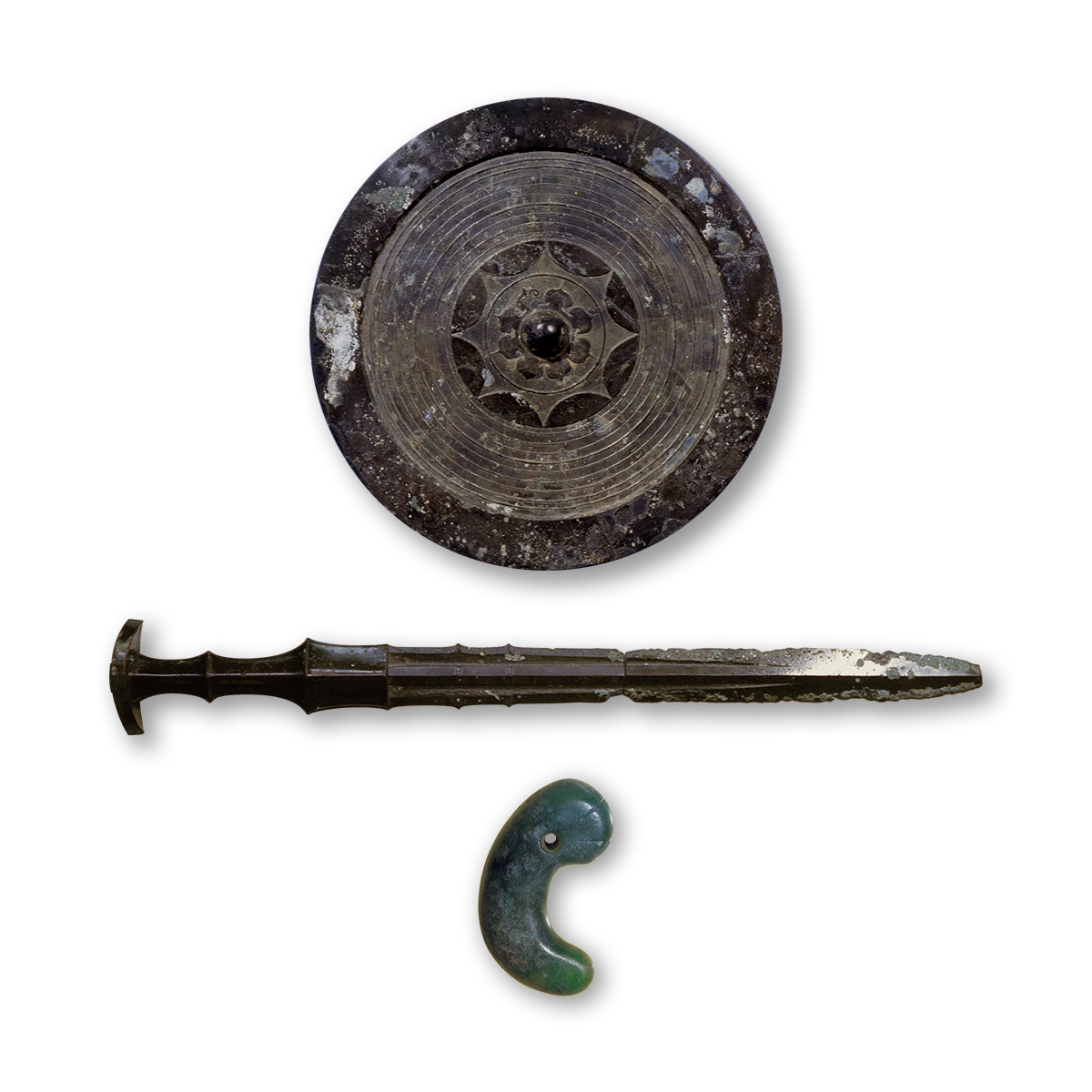

In many stories, Ninigi receives three gifts. The sword Kusanagi no Tsurugi, the mirror Yata no Kagami, and the jewel Yasakani no Magatama.

=== Descent to earth ===
Ninigi's descent to earth appears in both the Nihon Shoki and the Kojiki. In an earlier version of the Nihon Shoki Ninigi descends to earth unaccompanied.

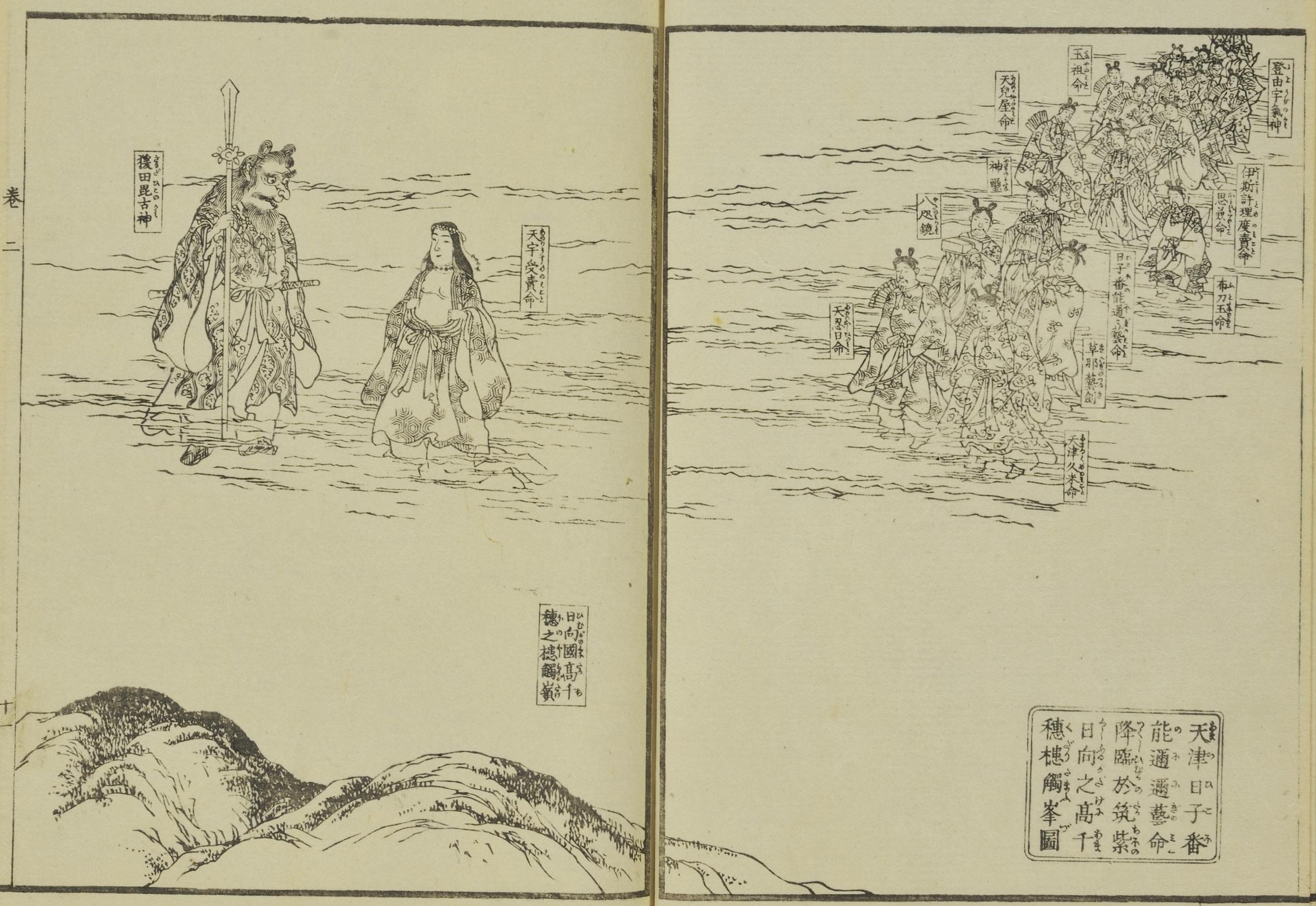

But in a later version of the Nihon Shoki and the Kojiki, other gods accompany Ninigi’s journey to earth; who accompanies him and how many depends on the version. But it usually includes the following gods: Uzume, Sarutahiko, Koyane, Futodama, Ishikoridome, and Tamanooya; many of these deities would later become the ancestors of many clans like Sarume clan, Nakatomi clan, Shinabe clan, and Inbe clan.

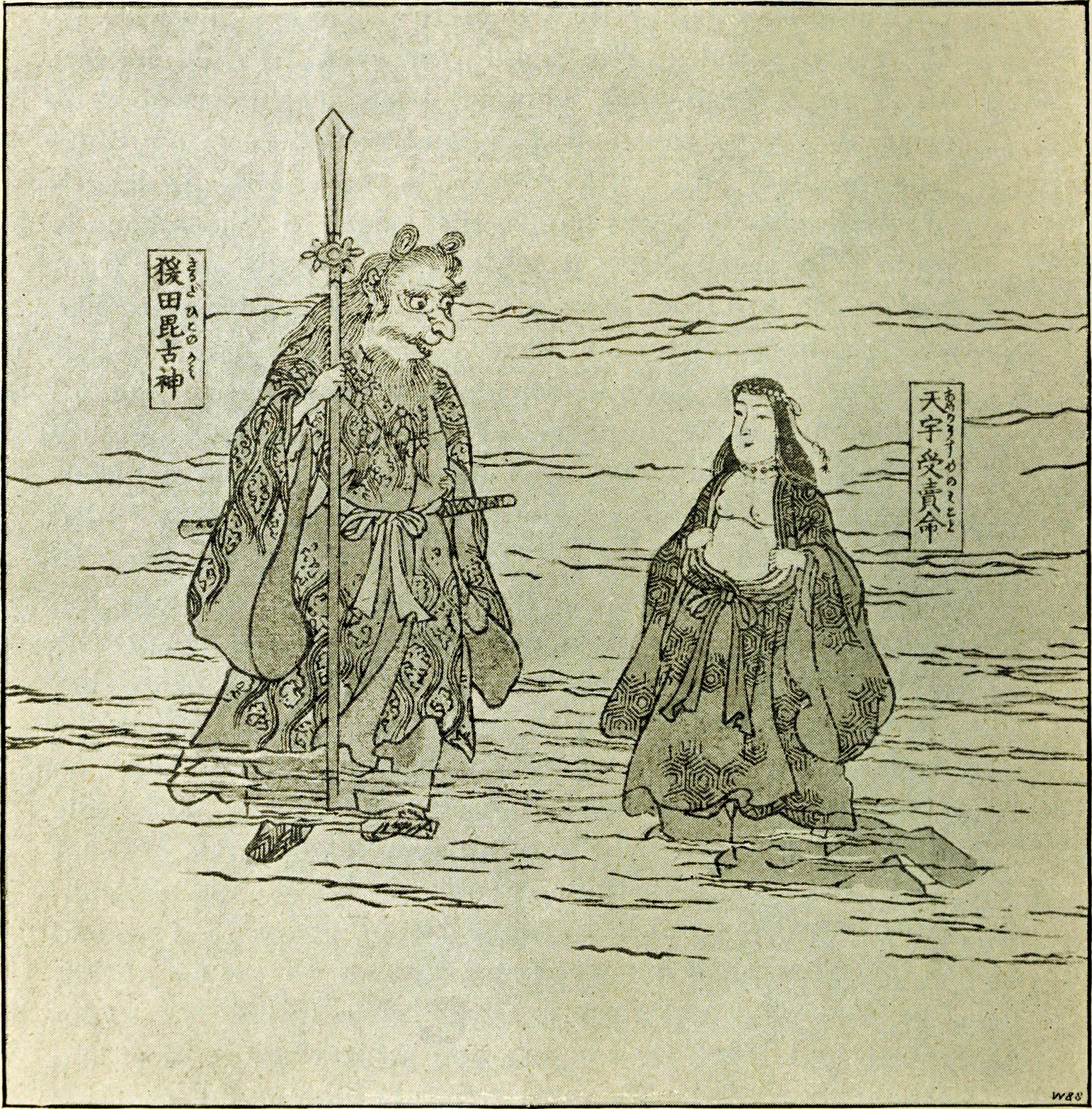

Ninigi tries to go to earth but he is blocked by Sarutahiko. Uzume then persuades Sarutahiko to let Ninigi pass.

In most versions Ninigi descends to earth on Mt. Takachiho in the Kirishima Mountains of Kyushu.

=== Loss of immortality ===
One story involves Ninigi looking for a wife; he meets the mountain god Oyamatsumi, Oyamatsumi presents Ninigi his two daughters Sakuyahime and Iwanagahime. However, Ninigi accepts Sakuyahime but rejects Iwanagahime due to her ugliness and is cursed for rejecting her. According to the Kojiki, Ōyamatsumi explained that he had offered both daughters together as a pledge that the emperors' lives would be eternal like rock, embodied by the elder sister Iwanagahime ("Princess of the Rock"); but because she had been sent back, the emperors' lives would from then on be as fleeting as the blossoms of flowering trees, embodied by Sakuyahime. The Nihon Shoki instead attributes the outcome to a curse pronounced by Iwanagahime herself, embarrassed at having been rejected, dooming the emperors and all other beings to lives as transient as a blossoming tree; in later tradition, Iwanagahime herself came to be venerated as a tutelary deity of longevity. Going forward, he and his descendants would live shorter lives from now on.

=== Birth of Ninigi’s children ===
Soon after Ninigi and Sakuyahime got married, Sakuyahime got pregnant in just one night. Ninigi accused his wife Sakuyahime of adultery. In many versions his wife Sakuyahime decided to go in to a hut and set the hut on fire to prove that she was a faithful wife. Sakuyahime and her sons survived, she gave birth to three sons named Hoderi, Hosusero, and Hoori.

One variation says that Sakuyahime gave birth to Hoderi in the hut and had the other two sons later.

=== Death ===
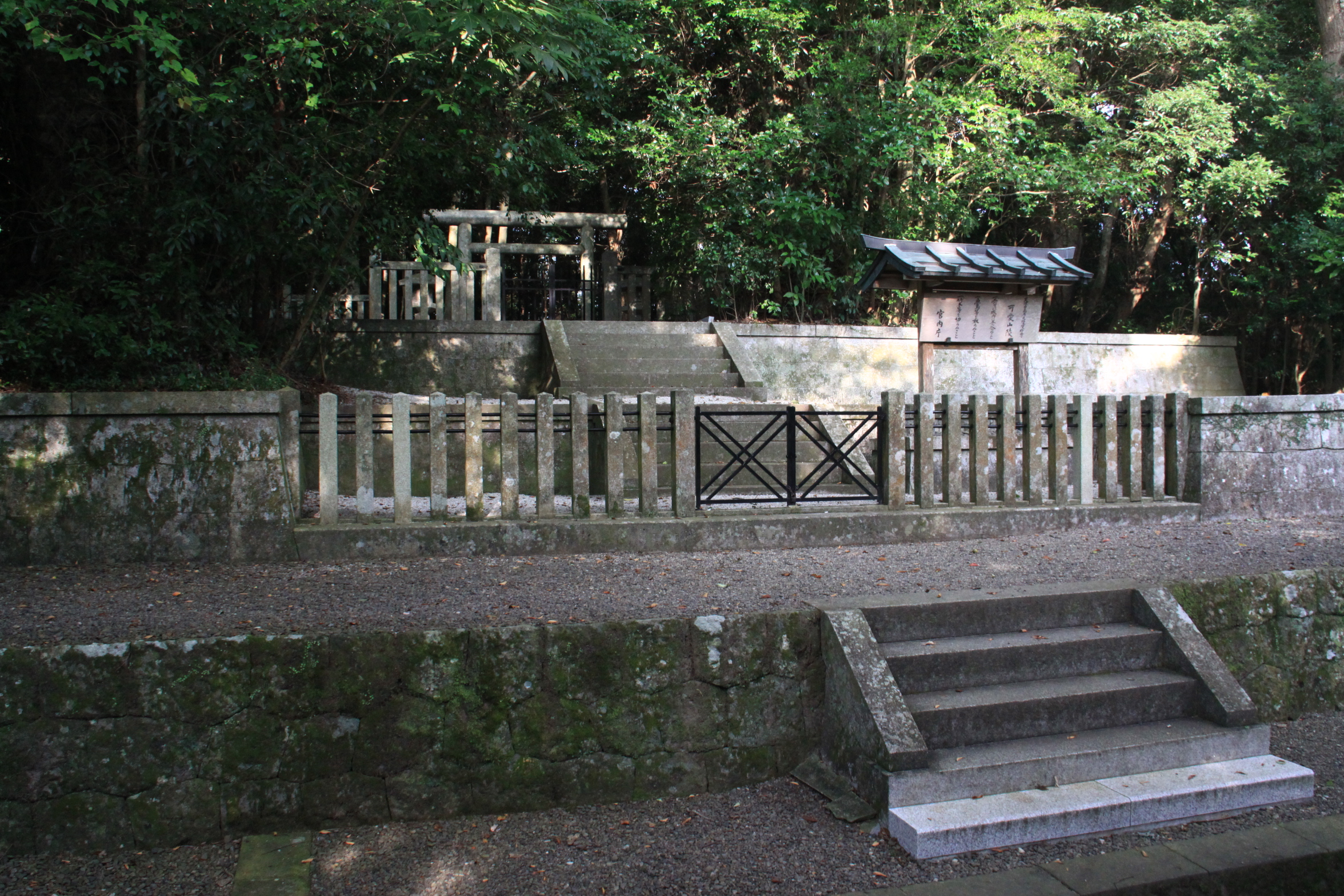
Enoyama no misasagi, the Imperial Household Agency-designated burial site of Ninigi at Nitta Shrine, Satsumasendai

Later on, Ninigi died and was buried at E no Goriyo. The Nihon Shoki describes his burial place as "Hyūga no Enoyama no misasagi." Although several sites in southern Kyushu have historically been associated with this location, the Imperial Household Agency currently designates Nitta Shrine in Satsumasendai, Kagoshima Prefecture as Ninigi's official burial site; the shrine came under the agency's direct administration in 1914.

== Family ==
Amaterasu	Takamimusubi
Ame-no-oshihomimi	Takuhadachiji-hime	Ōyamatsumi
Ninigi-no-Mikoto （天孫）	Konohanasakuya-hime	Watatsumi
Hoderi	Hosuseri （海幸彦）	Hoori （山幸彦）	Toyotama-hime	Utsushihikanasaku	Furutama-no-mikoto
Tensori no Mikoto	Ugayafukiaezu	Tamayori-hime	Azumi people	（Owari clan Yamato clan)
Hayato people	Itsuse	Inahi	Mikeiri	Jimmu	Ahiratsu-hime
Imperial House of Japan	Tagishimimi

- Red background is female.
- Green background means groups
- Bold letters are three generations of Hyuga.

Many versions have Amaterasu and Takamimusubi as Ninigi's grandparents, and the son of Ame no Oshihomimi and Yorozuhatahime as his parents. Ninigi is said to be the nephew to Futodama and Ame no Koyane.

Ninigi is in the Three generations of Hyuga, a time period between Tenson kōrin and Jimmu's Eastern Expedition.

== Worship of Ninigi ==
=== Shrines ===
Ninigi has very few temples where he is enshrined.

Shrines like Amatsu Shrine and Kirishima-jingu Shrine are dedicated to Ninigi. At Ise shrine, Ninigi is said to be worshipped along with Kuni no Tokotachi.
