= Hoori =

Figure in Japanese mythology

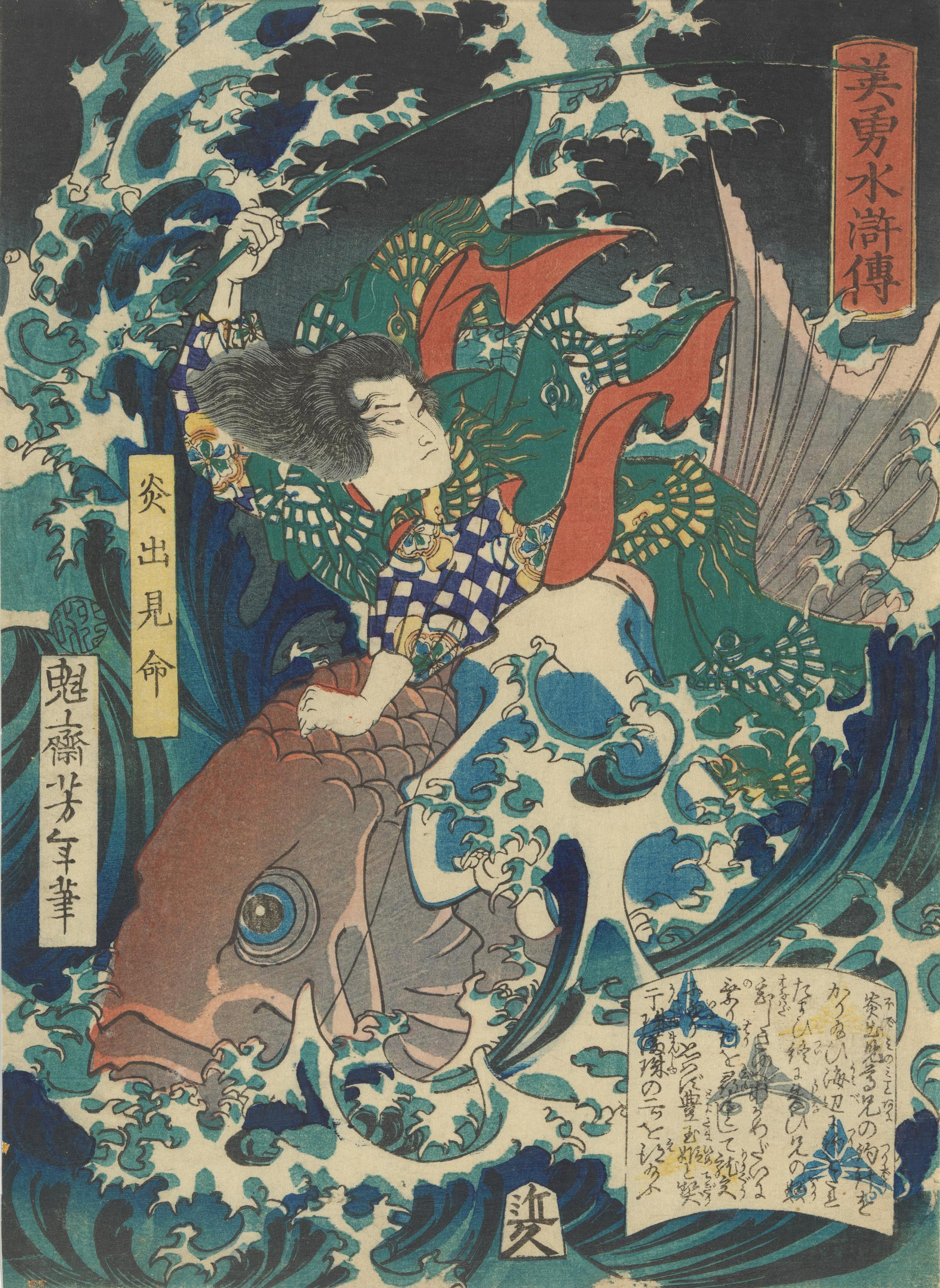
- Hoori riding a giant Tai, by Yoshitoshi, 1867

Genealogy
- Parents: Ninigi (father); Sakuyahime (mother)
- Siblings: Hoderi; Hosuseri
- Consort: Toyotamahime
- Children: Ugayafukiaezu

Hoori (火折) or Hoori no Mikoto (火折尊), also known as Hikohohodemi no Mikoto (彦火火出見尊), is a god in Japanese mythology, the third and youngest son of Ninigi and Sakuyahime. He is one of the ancestors of the Emperors of Japan as the grandfather of Emperor Jimmu. He is also known as Yamasachihiko (山幸彦).

== Mythology ==
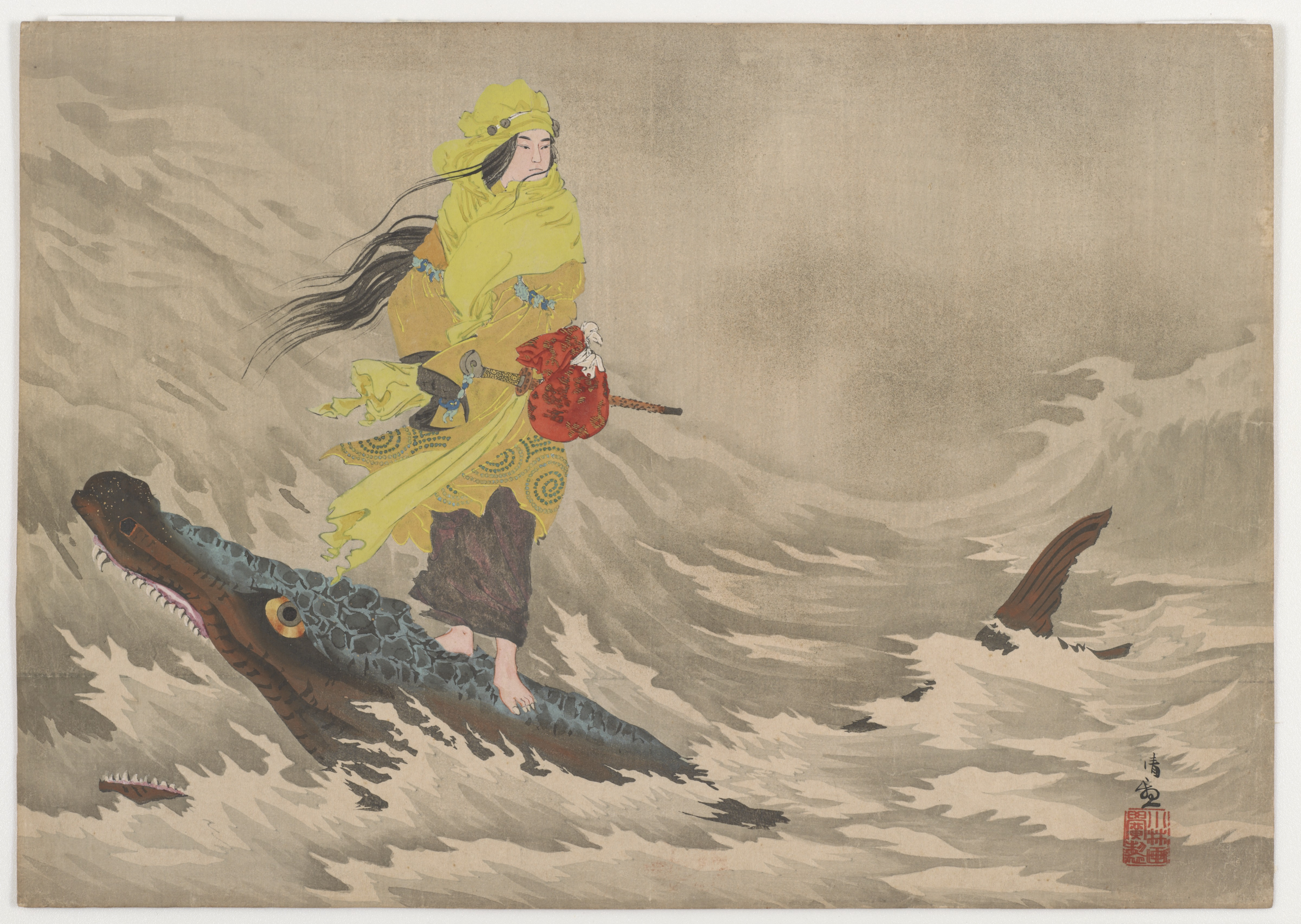
⠀⠀Hoori riding a Crocodile across the sea, by Kiyochika, 1894-1896

Hoori's legend is told in both the Kojiki and the Nihon Shoki. Hoori was a hunter, and he had an argument with his brother Hoderi, a fisherman, over a fish-hook that Hoori had forced his elder brother to lend him and had lost. Hoderi claimed that Hoori should give back the fish-hook, for he refused to accept another one (due to the belief that each tool is animated and hence unique). Hoori then descended to the bottom of the sea to search, but was unable to find it. Instead, he found Toyotamahime, the daughter of the sea god, Ōwatatsumi. Ōwatatsumi helped Hoori find Hoderi's lost fish-hook, and Hoori later married Toyotamahime.

Hoori lived with his wife Toyotamahime in a palace under the sea for three years, but after that Hoori became home-sick and wished to return to his own country. His brother forgave him after he returned the fish-hook, and Toyotamahime gave birth to a son named Ugayafukiaezu. During the time when Toyotamahime was giving birth to her child, she had Hoori swear not to attempt to see her real figure. But he broke his promise and discovered her true form which was a Wani. She was ashamed and returned to her father, never to return. Ugayafukiaezu married Toyotamahime's younger sister, Tamayorihime, who raised him, and gave birth to Emperor Jimmu, who was the first Emperor of Japan.

Hoori is often associated with both his parents and his wife. He is worshiped mainly as a god of cereals or grain. In Japanese mythology, it was said that the ho (火) part of his name meant fire, but etymologically, it is a different character pronounced ho (穂), which refers to crops, particularly rice. Ori (折り; to bend) indicates a crop that is so rich, it bends under its own weight. Another name for him, Hohodemi, means many harvests.

== Genealogy ==
Hoori is part of the Three Generations of Hyūga, a period between Tenson Kōrin and Jimmu's Eastern Expedition.

Amaterasu	Takamimusubi
Ame-no-oshihomimi	Takuhadachiji-hime	Ōyamatsumi
Ninigi-no-Mikoto （天孫）	Konohanasakuya-hime	Watatsumi
Hoderi	Hosuseri （海幸彦）	Hoori （山幸彦）	Toyotama-hime	Utsushihikanasaku	Furutama-no-mikoto
Tensori no Mikoto	Ugayafukiaezu	Tamayori-hime	Azumi people	（Owari clan Yamato clan)
Hayato people	Itsuse	Inahi	Mikeiri	Jimmu	Ahiratsu-hime
Imperial House of Japan	Tagishimimi

- Red background is female.
- Green background means groups
- Bold letters are three generations of Hyuga.
