= Ōyamatsumi =

Japanese god

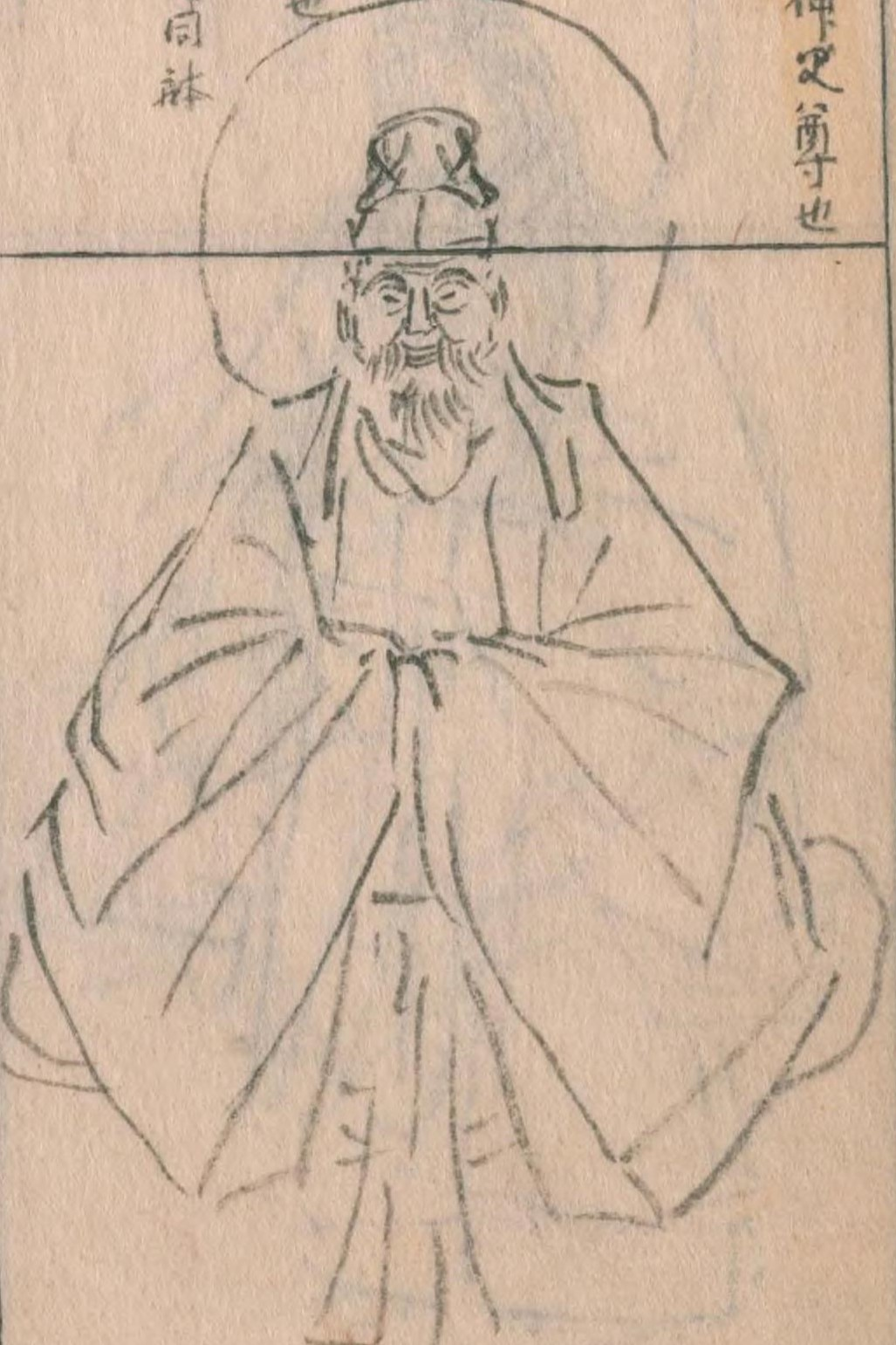

Genealogy
- Parents: Izanagi (father); Izanami (mother)
- Siblings: Amaterasu; Tsukuyomi; Susanoo; Kayanohime; Kukunochi; Watatsumi; (and others)
- Consort: Kayanohime
- Children: Kamuōichihime; Iwanagahime; Sakuyahime; Konohanachiruhime; Ashinazuchi and Tenazuchi

Equivalents
- Greek: Ourea

Ōyamatsumi (大山津見神, 大山祇神, 大山積神, 大山罪神), also known as Watashi no Ōkami (和多志大神) or Sakatoke (酒解神), is a god of mountains, seas, and war in Japanese mythology. He is an elder brother of Amaterasu, Tsukuyomi, and Susanoo.

== Genealogy ==
=== Kojiki genealogy ===
In the Kamiumi section of the Kojiki, Ōyamatsumi was born between Izanagi and Izanami. With the female deity Kayanohime (鹿屋野比売神), also known as Nozuchi (野椎神), he fathered eight kami (deities):

- Ame no Sazuchi (天之狭土), female kami
- Kuni no Sazuchi (国之狭土), male kami
- Ame no Sagiri (天之狭霧), female kami
- Kuni no Sagiri (国之狭霧), male kami
- Ame no Kurado ((天之闇戸), female kami
- Kuni no Kurado (国之闇戸), male kami
- Otomatohiko (大戸惑子), male kami
- Otomatohime (大戸惑女), female kami

Ōyamatsumi also had several other children:

- Kamuōichihime (神大市比売), who then later gave birth to Ōtoshi (大歳) and Ukanomitama (宇迦之御魂).
- Konohanachiruhime (木花知流比売), the wife of Yashimajinumi (八島士奴美神), Ōyamatsumi's nephew through Susanoo.
- Iwanagahime (石長比売), who was rejected by Ninigi due to her ugliness.
- Konohanasakuya-hime (木花之佐久夜毘売), or simply Sakuyahime (咲耶姫) was the goddess of cherry blossoms and the wife of Ninigi.

In later genealogical traditions, particularly some medieval charts that represent variant passages of the Nihon Shoki, but importantly not in the Kojiki, nor the main Nihon Shoki narrative themselves, Ashinazuchi and Tenazuchi were siblings fathered by Ōyamatsumi. In the Kojiki, Ashinazuchi and Tenazuchi are simply introduced as an elderly married couple living in Izumo with Kushinadahime who was their last surviving daughter. In the Kojiki, no parentage is given for them. This discrepancy stems from the Kojiki and Nihon Shoki being primarily political documents and not having been fully harmonized. Furthermore, medieval schools such as Ise, Yoshida, and Suika, and later Kokugaku scholars, reworked genealogies extensively.

=== Nihon Shoki genealogy ===
However, in the Nihon Shoki, Ōyamatsumi is supposed to be born when Izanagi slashed his child, Kagutsuchi (軻遇突智).

The child of Ōyamatsumi from his first wife Kayanohime, the deity Ame no Sagiri has a daughter, Tohotsumachine (遠津待根神), and the eighth descendant of the male deity Ōkuninushi (大国主神), the male deity Ame no Hibaraōshinadomi (天日腹大科度美神), from their union gave birth to the male deity, Tootsuyamasakitarashi (遠津山岬多良斯神), who is the descendant of Ōyamatsumi.

There is not much written about Ōyamatsumi, and children associated with him appears at times. As for the myth of Yamata no Orochi, Susanoo's wife, Kushinadahime (櫛名田比売命), and her twin parents, the male deity Ashinazuchi (足名椎) and the female deity Tenazuchi (手名椎), are known and claimed to be the children of Ōyamatsumi.

Afterwards, the lineage falls together with his descendants of his half-brother Susanoo, with the union of Ōyamatsumi's first daughter, Kamuōichihime (神大市比売), between them gave birth to Ōtoshi and Ukanomitama. Then, Susanoo's union with Ōyamatsumi granddaughter, Kushinadahime, gave birth to the male deity Yashimajinumi (八島士奴美神). Then Yashimajinumi married Ōyamatsumi's daughter Konohanachiruhime (木花知流比売), from their union gave birth to the male deity Fuwanomojikunusunu (布波能母遅久奴須奴神) who became the husband of Hikawahime (日河比売), the daughter of the male deity Kuraokami (淤加美神), from their union gave birth to the male deity Fukabuchi no Mizuyarehana (深淵之水夜礼花神).

Then, Fukafuchi no Mizuyarehana married Ame no Tsubohechine (天之都度閇知泥神, or 阿麻乃都刀閇乃知尼, Ame no Tsutsohenochine in the "Origin of the Great Shining Deity Awaga" (Awaga Daimyōjin Mototsufumi, 粟鹿大明神元記)) and from their union gave birth to Omizunu (淤美豆奴神, or 意弥都奴). Then, Omizunu married the female deity Futemimi (布帝耳神), who is the daughter of the deity Funozuno (布怒豆怒神) and from their union gave birth to the male deity Ame no Fuyukinu (天之冬衣神). Ame no Fuyukinu married the female deity Sashikuniwakahime (刺国若比売), who is the daughter of the male deity Sashikuni Ōkami, from their union gave birth to the male deity Ōkuninushi, the sixth generation grandson of Ōyamatsumi. These are recorded from a book called the "Origin of the Great Shining Deity Awaga" (Awaga Daimyōjin Mototsufumi, 粟鹿大明神元記) at Awaga Shrine (粟鹿神社, Awaga Jinja) in Awaga, town of Santō, Asago, Hyōgo Prefecture, Japan.

In the myth of Tenson Kōrin (天孫降臨), the descent of Amaterasu's grandson Ninigi from Takamagahara to Ashihara no Nakatsukuni, Ninigi has encountered Ōyamatsumi's daughter Sakuyahime (木花之佐久夜毘売), - the kami of Mount Fuji, Ōyamatsumi has offered both Sakuyahime and her older sister Iwanagahime (石長比売). Then, when Ninigi sends back Iwanagahime due to her hideous appearance, which in return angers Ōyamatsumi and said, "The reason why I gave together with Iwanagahime aside from her sibling Sakuyahime was because I made a pledge that the heavenly grandson (Ninigi) would be eternal like a rock, but she was sent back and the life expectancy of the heavenly grandson (Ninigi) was shortened."

His most important shrine, Ōyamazumi Shrine, is located on Ōmishima.

Amaterasu	Takamimusubi
Ame-no-oshihomimi	Takuhadachiji-hime	Ōyamatsumi
Ninigi-no-Mikoto 天孫	Konohanasakuya-hime	Watatsumi
Hoderi	Hosuseri 海幸彦	Hoori 山幸彦	Toyotama-hime	Utsushihikanasaku	Furutama-no-mikoto
Tensori no Mikoto	Ugayafukiaezu	Tamayori-hime	Azumi people	Owari clan Yamato clan
Hayato people	Itsuse	Inahi	Mikeiri	Jimmu	Ahiratsu-hime
Imperial House of Japan	Tagishimimi

- Red background is female.
- Green background means groups
- Bold letters are three generations of Hyuga.
