= Hosuseri =

God in Japanese mythology

Genealogy
- Parents: Ninigi (father); Sakuyahime (mother)
- Siblings: Hoderi; Hoori

Hosuseri (火須勢理命, Hosuseri-no-mikoto) is a kami that appears in Japanese mythology. According to the Kojiki, he is the second child of Ninigi-no-Mikoto and Konohanasakuya-hime. He is one of the grand-uncles of Emperor Jimmu.

While the first character ho (火) of his name means "flame" in modern Japanese, its etymological root is in the character for ripening ears of rice (穂, ho). That, in combination with the "advancing" meaning of suseri, results in his name meaning "Rice-Ear Advancing".

== Overview ==
Hosuseri (火須勢理命) appears in the Kojiki but not in the Nihon Shoki. In the Kojiki, he is noted as the second child of Ninigi and Sakuyahime then makes no further appearances. After a brief sexual encounter with Ninigi, Sakuyahime becomes pregnant in one night. However, Ninigi doubts she could conceive so quickly. Frustrated with Ninigi's suspicion, Sakuyahime builds a long birthing hut and sets it on fire. Amid the blaze, she gives birth to three male kami: Hoderi, Hosuseri, and Hoori in that order.

There are variations on the tale of the birth of Ninigi's children in the Nihon Shoki giving different names and numbers of children ranging from two to four, but usually three. While the name Hosuseri (火須勢理命) is not seen, there does appear a Hosusori-no-mikoto (火闌降命) or Hosuseri-no-mikoto (火酢芹命; note the difference in kanji).

== Genealogy ==
Amaterasu	Takamimusubi
Ame-no-oshihomimi	Takuhadachiji-hime	Ōyamatsumi
Ninigi-no-Mikoto 天孫	Konohanasakuya-hime	Watatsumi
Hoderi	Hosuseri 海幸彦	Hoori 山幸彦	Toyotama-hime	Utsushihikanasaku	Furutama-no-mikoto
Tensori no Mikoto	Ugayafukiaezu	Tamayori-hime	Azumi people	Owari clan Yamato clan
Hayato people	Itsuse	Inahi	Mikeiri	Jimmu	Ahiratsu-hime
Imperial House of Japan	Tagishimimi

- Red background is female.
- Green background means groups
- Bold letters are three generations of Hyuga.

== See also ==
- List of Japanese deities
- Tenson kōrin
