= Toyotama-hime =

Japanese goddess

Toyotama-hime 豊玉姫
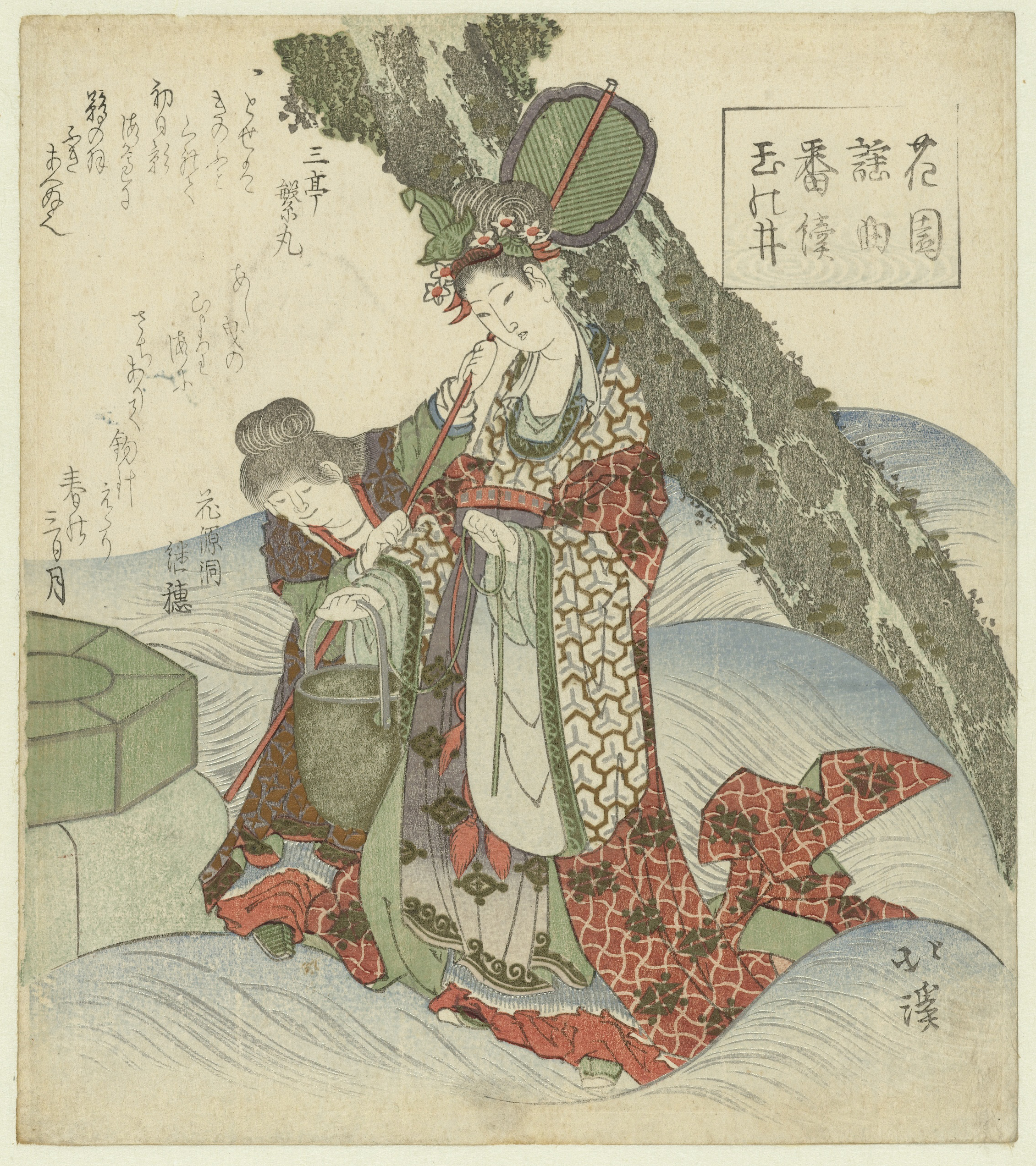
- Toyotama-hime with her younger sister Tamayori-hime
- Major cult centre: Kaijin Shrine

Genealogy
- Parents: Watatsumi (father)
- Siblings: Utsushihikanasaku; Tamayori-hime; Furutama-no-mikoto
- Spouse: Hoori
- Children: Ugayafukiaezu

Toyotama-hime (Japanese: 豊玉姫) is a goddess in Japanese mythology who appears in Kojiki and Nihon Shoki. She is the daughter of the sea deity, Watatsumi, and the wife of Hoori. She is known as the paternal grandmother of Emperor Jimmu, the first emperor of Japan.

Toyotama marries the prince Hoori, but returns to the sea when he breaks the vow not to spy on her while she goes through childbirth. The child she gave birth to was Ugayafukiaezu.

== Name ==
Toyotama-hime's name is believed to mean "a miko (shrine maiden) who makes rich pearls attract divine spirits," in which toyo (豊) stands for "rich" and tama (玉) stands for "pearl".

== Myth ==
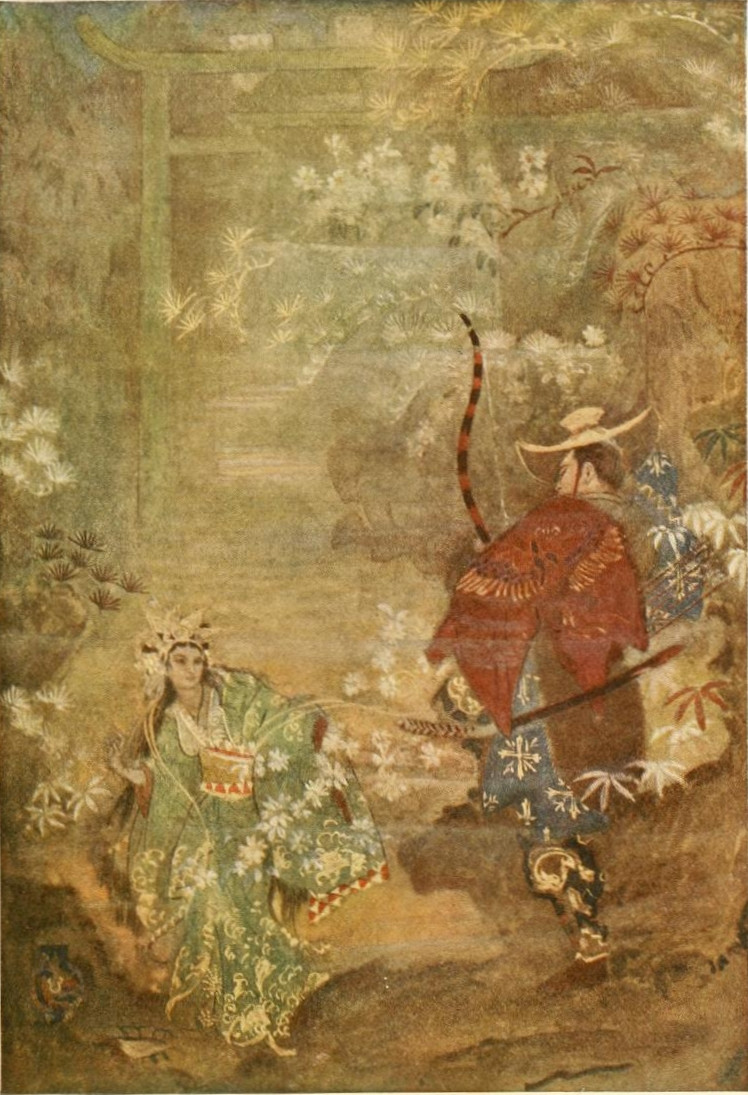
Hoori meets Toyotama-hime —illustration by Evelyn Paul

The account of Toyotama-hime and Hoori appear in the Kojiki and the Nihon Shoki.

Toyotama-hime was the daughter of the sea deity Watatsumi. The palace where they reside is said to be as if made from fish scales and supposedly lies undersea. (Note: Luck of the Mountains makes the trip there by entering a woven bamboo boat, which is sunk into the sea according to "one version" in the Nihon Shoki. The Kojiki does not explicitly say that he was plunged underwater, so the reading is that he was let "sail for a little while".)

She makes a fateful meeting with the hunter prince, Yamasachi, also known as Hoori ("Fire-Subside"). The prince came in search of the fishing hook he lost at sea, borrowed from his elder brother Umisachi ("Luck of the Sea").

When the princess came to draw water from the well, the prince was already waiting, having climbed a katsura tree (or cassia tree) that towered above the well. The prince asked for a drink of water and made a gesture of spitting jewels into the vessel. The princess was captivated by his beauty. Her sea deity father recognized him as the descendant of the heavenly gods and arranged a banquet. Toyotama married the prince, and they lived in the place for three years.

At the end of three years, Toyotama's husband let out a sigh and revealed his unfinished quest for the lost fish hook, which needed to be returned to his brother. After the hook was found caught in the sea bream's (tai fish's) throat, Toyotama's husband was set upon a one-fathom long crocodile (or shark) to return home and, with the advice from the seagod, subjugated his elder brother.

Toyotama, who had accompanied her husband to the land above sea, announced her pregnancy. The prince built for her a child-delivery hut (parturition house) thatched with cormorant feathers, which was not completely thatched when she went into labour. Toyotama requested Hoori not watch while she gave birth to their child. Toyotama then gave birth to a son, who was named Ugayafukiaezu ("Cormarant-Thatch-Meeting-Incompletely") or "Heavenly Male Brave of the Shore". (Note: Full name rendered "Heaven's-Sun-Height-Prince-Wave-limit-Brave-Cormorant-Thatch-Meeting-Incompletely".)

Unfortunately, Hoori's curiosity got the better of him and he attempted to spy on his wife. To his surprise, rather than seeing his wife as he knew her, he witnessed an enormous wani (crocodile, or in ancient usage also meant shark) cradling his child (one Nihongi version claim she was a dragon, Tatsu). This creature was none other than his beloved Toyotama who had shape-shifted to give birth. After catching her husband spying on her, she was utterly ashamed that he broke his promise. Unable to forgive Hoori, she abandoned him and their child by returning to the sea. Following her departure, she sent her younger sister Tamayori ("Jewel-Good") to help raise the child in her absence. As Ugayafukiaezu grew of age, he married his aunt and eventually conceived a child, Jimmu, who became the first Emperor of Japan.

== Parallels ==
Some commentators have noted a parallel between Toyotama-hime and the princess Oto-hime in the tale of Urashima Tarō, the boy who saves a turtle. Toyotama rode a sea turtle to return from the sea to give birth, according to the Nihon Shoki.

The transformation of Toyotama into a crocodile form draws parallels with the Melusine legend of continental Europe and selkie legends of Scotland and Scandinavia.

Japanese scholar Hiroko Ikeda, in her index of Japanese folktales based on the international Aarne-Thompson Index, indexed the myth as type 470C, "The Lost Fish Hook (Umisachi Yamasuchi)": one of two brothers (one a fisherman, the other a hunter) loses the fisherman's hook and, on his quest, meets and marries the daughter of a marine Dragon King; later, he regains the fish hook and is given a jewel to control the tides; at the end of the tale, the hunter's wife asks him not to see her while she is giving birth, but he breaks the taboo and finds a crocodile (wani) in her place. According to Ikeda, the tale has circum-Pacific distribution, that is, similar tales are found among ethnic groups that inhabit the Pacific Ocean shores.

== Legacy ==
=== Popular culture ===
- Throughout Japanese media, human-dragon hybrids (former on their mother's side as the case with Toyotama) are commonplace, notably in video games such as Popolocrois, Fire Emblem and Breath of Fire.
- In the Japanese anime Sekirei, there is a Sekirei named Toyotama that fights using a traditional wooden staff.
- Samantha Shannon’s novel, “The Priory of the Orange Tree”, is loosely based on this legend.

=== Science ===
The extinct crocodile genus Toyotamaphimeia was named after this deity, in direct reference to this myth.

== Genealogy ==
Amaterasu	Takamimusubi
Ame-no-oshihomimi	Takuhadachiji-hime	Ōyamatsumi
Ninigi-no-Mikoto （天孫）	Konohanasakuya-hime	Watatsumi
Hoderi	Hosuseri （海幸彦）	Hoori （山幸彦）	Toyotama-hime	Utsushihikanasaku	Furutama-no-mikoto
Tensori no Mikoto	Ugayafukiaezu	Tamayori-hime	Azumi people	（Owari clan Yamato clan)
Hayato people	Itsuse	Inahi	Mikeiri	Jimmu	Ahiratsu-hime
Imperial House of Japan	Tagishimimi

- Red background is female.
- Green background means groups
- Bold letters are three generations of Hyuga.

== See also ==
- The Wife from the Dragon Palace
