= Konohanasakuya-hime =

Goddess of Mount Fuji in Shinto

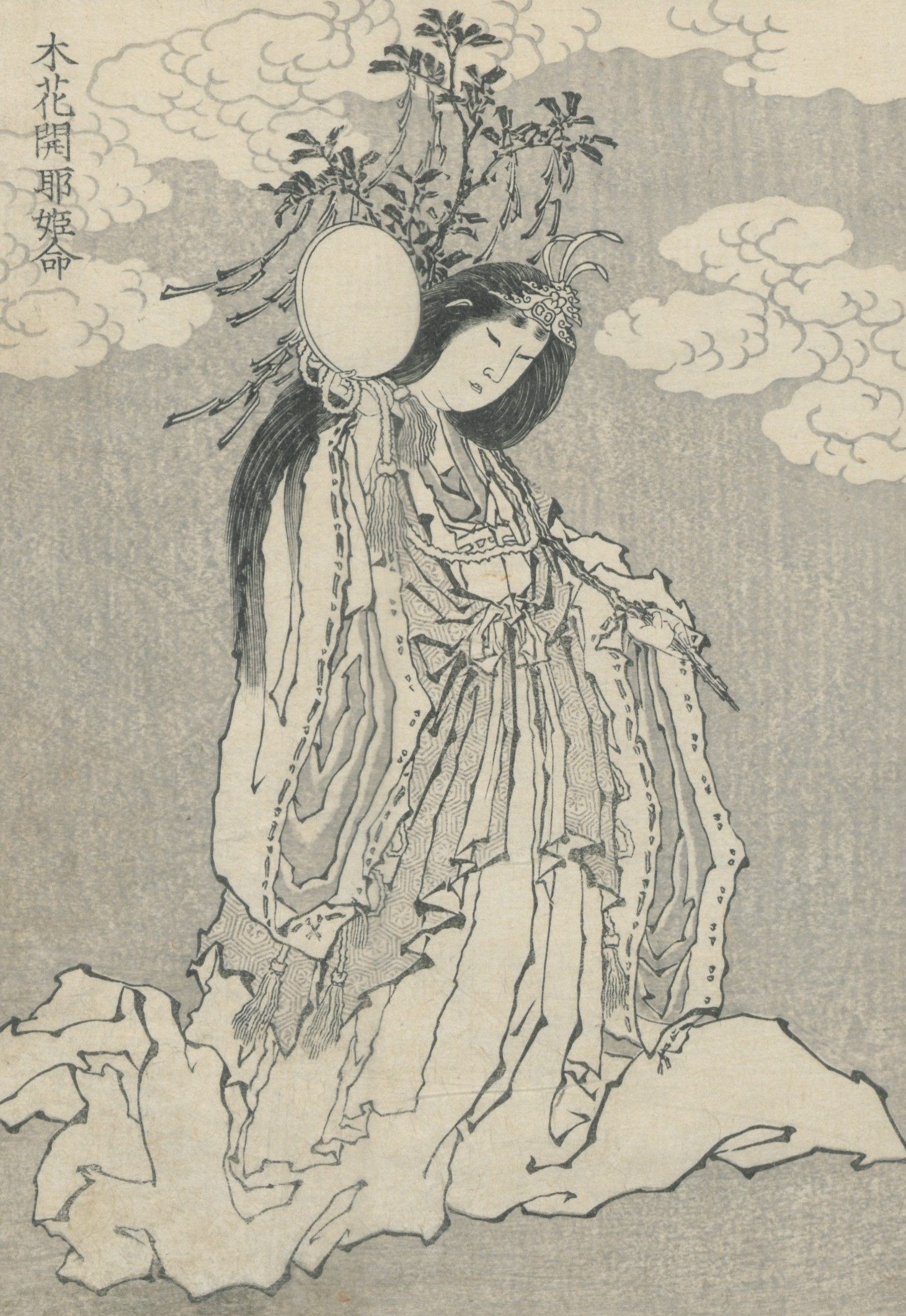
- Konohanasakuya-hime, print by Hokusai, 1834
- Other names: Konohananosakuya-hime; Sakuya-hime; Sengen; Asama no Ōkami
- Japanese: 木花之佐久夜毘売 木花咲耶姫 木花開耶姫
- Affiliation: Blossoms, life, Mount Fuji, volcanoes
- Major cult center: Asama shrines
- Abodes: Mount Fuji
- Symbol: Sakura cherry blossom
- Texts: Kojiki, Nihon Shoki, Sendai Kuji Hongi
- Gender: Female
- Region: Japan

Genealogy
- Parents: Ōyamatsumi (father); Kayanohime (mother)
- Siblings: Iwanagahime
- Consort: Ninigi
- Offspring: Hoderi, Hosuseri, Hoori

Konohanasakuya-hime is the kami of Mount Fuji and all volcanoes in Japanese mythology; she is also the 'blossom princess' and symbol of delicate earthly life. She is often considered an avatar of Japanese life, especially since her symbol is the cherry blossom (sakura).

Shinto shrines have been built on Mount Fuji for Sakuya-hime, collectively known as the Sengen shrines. It is believed that she will keep Mount Fuji from erupting, (Note: "In A.D. 806 a local official built a shrine near the foot of the volcano to keep it from erupting. The priests assigned the task of pacifying the mountain apparently neglected their duties because Fuji erupted with great violence in 864, causing much damage in a nearby province. The governor of that province blamed the priests for failing to perform the proper rites and constructed another shrine in his own territory, where he could make sure everything was done correctly. A fiery god of the mountain became at a later date the more peaceful Shinto goddess of Mount Fuji-- Konohana Sakuya Hime-- the Goddess of Flowering Trees." "Konohana Sakuya Hime originally had little or no connection with Mount Fuji. Sometime between the 14th and 16th centuries, the belief arose among the people of the region that she would protect them from eruptions of the volcano as she had her newborn son from the flames of the burning bower." Konohana is now the principal goddess of Mount Fuji. Members of Fuji-ko have altars in their own homes in which they worship Konohana Sakuya Hime. This group also lights a torch for Konohana Sakuya Hime at the fire ceremony at Fuji-Yoshida.) but shrines to her at Mount Kirishima have been repeatedly destroyed by volcanic eruptions. She is also known for having torn up the Yatsugatake Mountains because one was higher than Mount Fuji.

== Name and etymology ==

Konohanasakuya-hime or Konohananosakuya-hime (木花咲耶姫 or 木花開耶姫; lit. "cherry blossom blooming noble lady"; the shorter form Sakuya-hime is also used, and she is also called Sengen.))

== Myths ==
=== Ninigi and Sakuya-hime ===
Sakuya-hime met Ninigi on the seashore and they fell in love; Ninigi asked Ohoyamatsumi, the father of Sakuya-hime for her hand in marriage. Oho-Yama proposed his older daughter, Iwa-Naga-hime, instead, but Ninigi had his heart set on Sakuya-hime. Oho-Yama reluctantly agreed and Ninigi and Ko-no-hana married. Because Ninigi refused Iwa-Naga, the rock-princess, human lives are said to be short and fleeting, like the sakura blossoms, instead of enduring and long lasting, like stones.

Sakuya-hime became pregnant in just one night, causing suspicion in Ninigi. He wondered if this was the child of another kami. Sakuya-hime was enraged at Ninigi's accusation and entered a doorless hut, which she then set fire to, declaring that the child would not be hurt if it were truly the offspring of Ninigi. Inside the hut, Ko-no-hana had three sons, Hoderi, Hosuseri and Hoori.

=== Yosoji's camellia tree ===
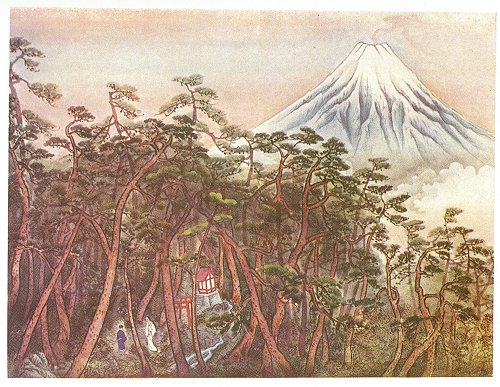
Konohanasakuya-hime guiding Yosoji to the stream —illustration by Ella Du Cane

According to an 11th-century legend, a small village in the Suruga Province named Kamiide was struck by smallpox epidemic. In the village, there lived a young boy named Yosoji and his mother, who was infected by the disease. To cure his mother, Yosoji went to a fortune teller who told him to give his mother water from a small stream near Mount Fuji.

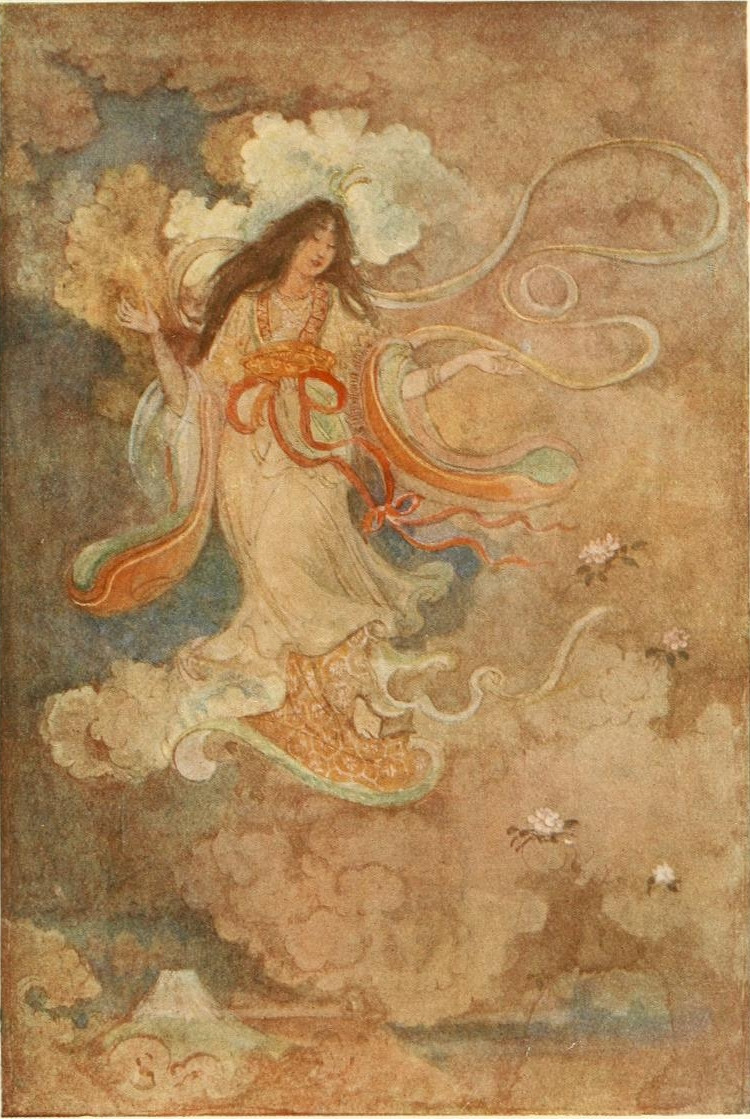
Konohanasakuya-hime flying

The next day, Yosoji decided to go to the river, but then stumbled upon three different paths, not knowing which one to take. A young girl in white came towards Yosoji from the forest and guided him to the stream. Yosoji scooped up water from the stream and gave it to his mother to drink.

Days later, Yosoji went back to the area where the three paths met, and met the girl in white once again. She told him to come back in three days, and that she would meet him there. She also told him that it would take five trips to the stream to treat all the villagers.

Five trips later, Yosoji's mother was healed, and so were many other villagers. The villagers thanked him, but he knew that he owed it all to the girl in white. So he went back to the stream to give thanks to the girl in white. However, he found that the stream was completely dried up and the girl was nowhere to be seen. Thus, Yosoji prayed that the girl would reveal herself, so that he might thank her for her actions.

The girl appeared before him and Yosoji said that he wished to tell her how deeply grateful he was to her and that he wished to know who she was, so he could tell the villagers whom to thank. The girl in white said that her identity was not important and said farewell to Yosoji. She then swung a branch of camellia over her head and a cloud from Mount Fuji came down and picked her up. Yosoji realized the woman was none other than the Goddess of Mount Fuji.

== Genealogy ==
Amaterasu	Takamimusubi
Ame-no-oshihomimi	Takuhadachiji-hime	Ōyamatsumi
Ninigi-no-Mikoto 天孫	Konohanasakuya-hime	Watatsumi
Hoderi	Hosuseri 海幸彦	Hoori 山幸彦	Toyotama-hime	Utsushihikanasaku	Furutama-no-mikoto
Tensori no Mikoto	Ugayafukiaezu	Tamayori-hime	Azumi people	Owari clan Yamato clan
Hayato people	Itsuse	Inahi	Mikeiri	Jimmu	Ahiratsu-hime
Imperial House of Japan	Tagishimimi

- Red background is female.
- Green background means groups
- Bold letters are three generations of Hyuga.

== In popular culture ==
In Persona 4, Konohana Sakuya is a persona owned by Yukiko Amagi.
