= Watatsumi =

Japanese sea deity

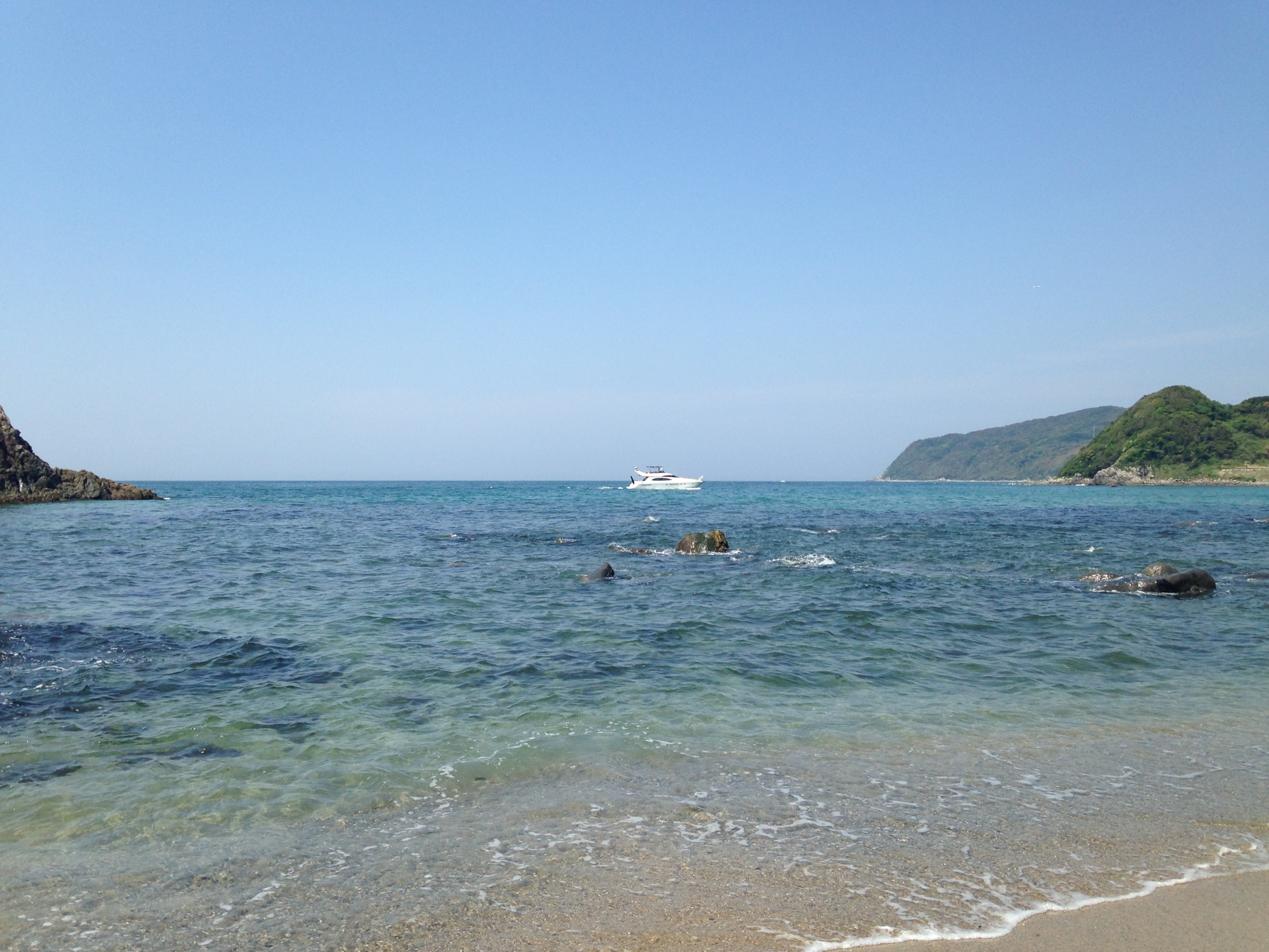
- Major cult centre: Watatsumi Jinja; Shikaumi Shrine; Watazumi Shrine

Genealogy
- Parents: Izanagi (father); Izanami (mother)
- Siblings: Ōyamatsumi
- Children: Utsushihikanasaku; Toyotamahime; Tamayorihime; Yasakatome; Furutama

Equivalents
- Greek: Pontus

Watatsumi (海神; 綿津見) [watatsɯmi], also pronounced Wadatsumi, is a kami (神, god; deity; spirit), Japanese dragon and tutelary water deity in Japanese mythology. Ōwatatsumi no kami (大綿津見神; "great deity of the sea") is believed to be another name for the sea deity Ryūjin (龍神, Dragon God) and also for the Watatsumi Sanjin (綿津見三神; "Three Watatsumi gods"), which rule the upper, middle and lower seas respectively and were created when Izanagi was washing himself of the dragons blood when he returned from Yomi, "the underworld".

The main shrine is Shikaumi Shrine on Shika Island in Fukuoka Prefecture.

== Name ==
The earliest written sources of Old Japanese transcribe the name of the sea god in a diverse manner. The c. 712 CE Kojiki (tr. Basil Hall Chamberlain 1883) writes it semantically as 海神 lit. "sea god" and transcribes it phonetically with man'yōgana as Wata-tsu-mi, 綿津見, lit. "cotton port see" in identifying Ōwatsumi kami and the Watatsumi Sanjin. The c. 720 CE Nihongi (tr. William George Aston 1896) also writes Watatsumi as 海神 "sea god", along with 海童 "sea child" and 少童命 "small child lords" for the Watatsumi Sanjin. In the modern Japanese writing system, the name Watatsumi is usually written either in katakana as ワタツミ or in kanji phonetically 綿津見 or semantically 海神 "sea god".

Note that in addition to reading 海神 as watatsumi, wata no kami or unagami in native Japanese kun'yomi pronunciation, it is also read kaijin or kaishin in Sino-Japanese on'yomi . The original Watatsumi meaning "tutelary deity of the sea" is semantically extended as a synecdoche or metaphor meaning "the sea; the ocean; the main".

The etymology of the sea god Watatsumi is uncertain. Marinus Willem de Visser (1913:137) notes consensus that wata is an Old Japanese word for "sea; ocean" and tsu is a possessive particle, but disagreement whether mi means "snake" or "lord; god". "It is not impossible" he concludes, "that the old Japanese sea-gods were snakes or dragons." Compare the Japanese rain god Kuraokami that was similarly described as a giant snake or a dragon. The comparative linguist Paul K. Benedict proposed (1990:236–7) that Japanese wata, 海, "sea" derives from Proto-Austronesian *wacal, "sea; open sea".

== Ōwatatsumi ==
The Kojiki version of the Japanese creation myth honorifically refers to Watatsumi 海神 with the name Ōwatatsumi kami 大綿津見神 "Great Watatsumi god". Compare this sea god with mountain god named Ohoyamatsumi 大山積. The world-creating siblings Izanagi and Izanami first give birth to the Japanese islands (kuniumi) and then to the gods (kamiumi).

When they had finished giving birth to countries, they began afresh giving birth to Deities. So the name of the Deity they gave birth to was the Deity Great-Male-of-the-Great-Thing; next they gave birth to the Deity Rock-Earth-Prince; next they gave birth to the Deity Rock-Nest-Princess; next they gave birth to the Deity Great-Door-Sun-Youth; next they gave birth to the Deity Heavenly-Blowing-Male; next they gave birth to the Deity Great-House-Prince; next they gave birth to the Deity Youth-of-the-Wind-Breath-the-Great-Male; next they gave birth to the Sea-Deity, whose name is the Deity Great-Ocean-Possessor; next they gave birth to the Deity of the Water-Gates, whose name is the Deity Prince-of-Swift-Autumn; next they gave birth to his younger sister the Deity Princess-of-Swift-Autumn. (tr. Chamberlain 1919:28)

Chamberlain (1919:30) explains mochi 持ち "having; taking; holding; grasping; owning" behind translating Ōwatsumi kami as "Deity Great-Ocean-Possessor", "The interpretation of mochi, "possessor," though not absolutely sure, has for it the weight both of authority and of likelihood."

A subsequent Kojiki passage describes Watatsumi's daughter Otohime and her husband Hoori living with the sea god. After Hoori lost his brother Hoderi's fishhook, he went searching to the bottom of the sea, where he met and married the dragon goddess Otohime. They lived in the sea god's underwater palace Ryūgū-jō for three years before Hoori became homesick.

So he dwelt in that land for three years. Hereupon His Augustness Fire-Subside thought of what had gone before, and heaved one deep sigh. So Her Augustness Luxuriant-Jewel-Princess, hearing the sigh, informed her father, saying: "Though he has dwelt three years [with us], he had never sighed; but this night he heaved one deep sigh. What may be the cause of it?" The Great Deity her father asked his son-in-law saying: "This morning I heard my daughter speak, saying: 'Though he has dwelt three years [with us], he had never sighed; but this night he heaved one deep sigh.' What may the cause be? Moreover what was the cause of thy coming here?" Then [His Augustness Fire-Subside] told the Great Deity exactly how his elder brother had pressed him for the lost fish-hook. Thereupon the Sea-Deity summoned together all the fishes of the sea, great and small, and asked them, saying: "Is there perchance any fish that has taken this fish-hook?" So all the fishes replied: "Lately the tahi has complained of something sticking in its throat preventing it from eating; so it doubtless has taken [the hook]." On the throat of the tahi being thereupon examined, there was the fish-hook [in it]. Being forthwith taken, it was washed and respectfully presented to His Augustness Fire-Subside, whom the Deity Great-Ocean-Possessor then instructed. (tr. Chamberlain 1919:149)

Watatsumi instructs Hoori how to deal with Hoderi, and chooses another mythic Japanese dragon, a wani "crocodile" or "shark", to transport his daughter and son in law back to land.

Two Nihongi contexts refer to Watatsumi in legends about Emperor Keikō and Emperor Jimmu. First, the army of Emperor Keikō encounters Hashirimizu 馳水 "running waters" crossing from Sagami Province to Kazusa Province. The calamity is attributed to the Watatsumi 海神 "sea god" and placated through human sacrifice.

Next he marched on to Sagami, whence he desired to proceed to Kadzusa. Looking over the sea, he spake with a loud voice, and said: "This is but a little sea: one might even jump over it." But, when he came to the middle of the sea a storm suddenly arose, and the Prince's ship was tossed about, so that he could not cross over. At this time there was a concubine in the Prince's suite, named Oto-tachibana-hime. She was the daughter of Oshiyama no Sukune of the Hodzumi House. She addressed the Prince, saying: "This present uprising of the winds and rushing of the waves, so that the Prince's ship is like to sink, must be due to the wishes of the God of the Sea. I pray thee let me go into the sea, and so let the person of thy mean handmaiden be given to redeem the life of the Prince's Augustness." Having finished speaking, she plunged into the billows. The storm forthwith ceased, and the ship was enabled to reach the shore. Therefore the people of that time called that sea Hashiri-midzu. (tr. Aston 1896:206)

Second, the genealogy of Emperor Jimmu claims descent from the goddess Toyotama-hime, the daughter of Hori and Otohime, who is identified as the daughter of Watatsumi 海童.

The Emperor Kami Yamato Ihare-biko's personal name was Hiko-hoho-demi. He was the fourth child of Hiko-nagisa-takeu-gaya-fuki-ahezu no Mikoto. His mother's name was Tamayori-hime, daughter of the Sea-God. From his birth, this Emperor was of clear intelligence and resolute will. (tr. Aston 1896:109-110)

There is uncertainty whether Nihongi scribes wrote tsumi with dō 童 "child; boy" simply for pronunciation or for some semantic significance.

== Watatsumi Sanjin ==
When Izanagi's sister-wife dies giving birth to the fire god Kagu-tsuchi, his destroying it creates various deities, including the snow dragon Kuraokami. After Izanagi goes to the underworld in a futile attempt to bring Izanami back to life, he returns to the world and undergoes ritual purifications to cleanse himself of hellish filth. He creates 12 deities from his garments and belongings and 14 (including the 3 Watatsumis) from bathing himself.

With the tsu 津 in these three dragon names being read as the genitive particle "of", they rule different water depths in the sea, soko 底 "bottom; underneath", naka 中 "middle; center", and uwa 上 "above; top" (Kojiki) or uwa 表 "surface; top" (Nihongi). Chamberlain (1919:48) notes, "There is the usual doubt as to the signification to be assigned to the syllable tsu in the second, fourth and last of these names. If it really means, not "elder" but "possessor," we should be obliged to translate by "the Bottom-Possessing-Male," etc."

The earlier Kojiki version of the "Three Watatsumi Gods" calls them Wakatsumikami 綿津見神 "Wakatsumi gods": Sokotsu Watatsumikami 底津, Nakatsu Watatsumikami 中津綿津見神, and Uwatsu Watatsumikami 上津綿津見神.

Thereupon saying: "The water in the upper reach is [too] rapid; the water in the lower reach is [too] sluggish," he went down and plunged in the middle reach; and, as he washed, there was first born the Wondrous-Deity-of-Eighty-Evils, and next the Wondrous-Deity-of-Great-Evils. These two Deities are the Deities that were born from the filth [he contracted] when he went to that polluted, hideous land. The names of the Deities that were next born to rectify those evils were: the Divine-Rectifying-Wondrous Deity, next the Great-Rectifying-Wondrous-Deity, next the Female-Deity-Idzu. The names of the Deities that were next born, as he bathed at the bottom of the water, were: the Deity Possessor-of-the-Ocean-Bottom, and next His Augustness Elder-Male-of-the-Bottom. The names of the Deities that were born as he bathed in the middle [of the water] were: the Deity Possessor-of-the-Ocean-Middle, and next His Augustness Elder-Male-of-the-Middle. The names of the Deities that were born as he bathed at the top of the water were the Deity Possessor-of-the-Ocean-Surface, and next His Augustness Elder-Male-of-the-Surface. These three Ocean-Possessing Deities are the Deities held in reverence as their ancestral Deities by the Chiefs of Adzumi. So the Chiefs of Adzumi are the descendants of His Augustness Utsushi-hi-gana-saku, a child of these Ocean-Possessing Deities. These three Deities His Augustness Elder-Male-of-the-Bottom, His Augustness Elder-Male-of-the-Middle, and His Augustness Elder-Male-of-the-Surface are the three Great Deities of the Inlet of Sumi. (tr. Chamberlain 1919:45-46)

The later Nihongi version describes the "Three Watatsumi Gods" as Watatsumi Mikoto 少童命 "small child lords": Sokotsu Watatsumi Mikoto 底津少童命, Nakatsu Watatsumi Mikoto 中津少童命, and Uwatsu Watatsumi Mikoto 表津少童命. These Watatsumis are paired with three O Mikoto 男命 "male lords".

Moreover, the Deities which were produced by his plunging down and washing in the bottom of the sea were called Soko-tsu-wata-tsu-mi no Mikoto and Sokotsutsu-wo no Mikoto. Moreover, when he plunged and washed in the mid-tide, there were Gods produced who were called Naka I tsu wata-dzu-mi no Mikoto, and next Naka-tsutsu-wo no Mikoto. Moreover, when he washed floating on the surface of the water, Gods were produced, who were called Uha-tsu-wata-dzu-mi no Mikoto and next Uhai-tsutsu-wo no Mikoto. There were in all nine Gods. The Gods Soko-tsutsu-wo no Mikoto, Naka-tsutsu-wo no Mikoto, and Soko-tsutsu-wo no Mikoto are the three great Gods of Suminoye. The Gods Soko-tsu-wata-dzu-mi no Mikoto, Naka-tsu-wata-dzu-mi no Mikoto, and Uha-tsu-wata-dzu-mi no Mikoto are the Gods worshipped by the Muraji of Adzumi. (tr. Aston 1896:27)

Aston notes translations of "Bottom-sea-of-body", "Middle-sea-god", and "upper".

== Shrines ==
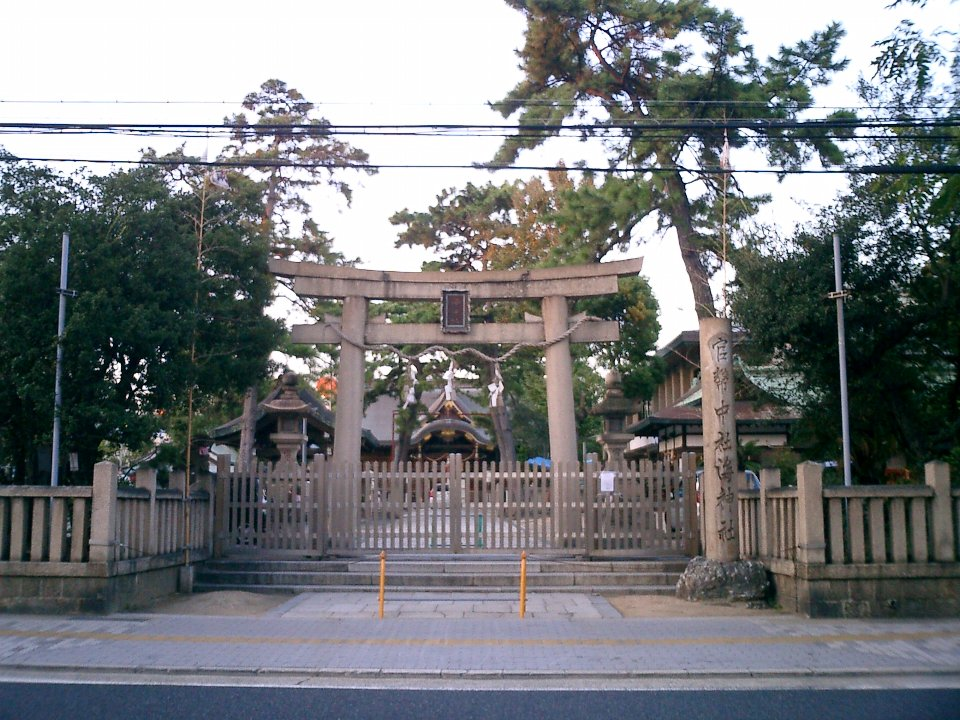
Watatsumi Shrine in Tarumi-ku, Kobe

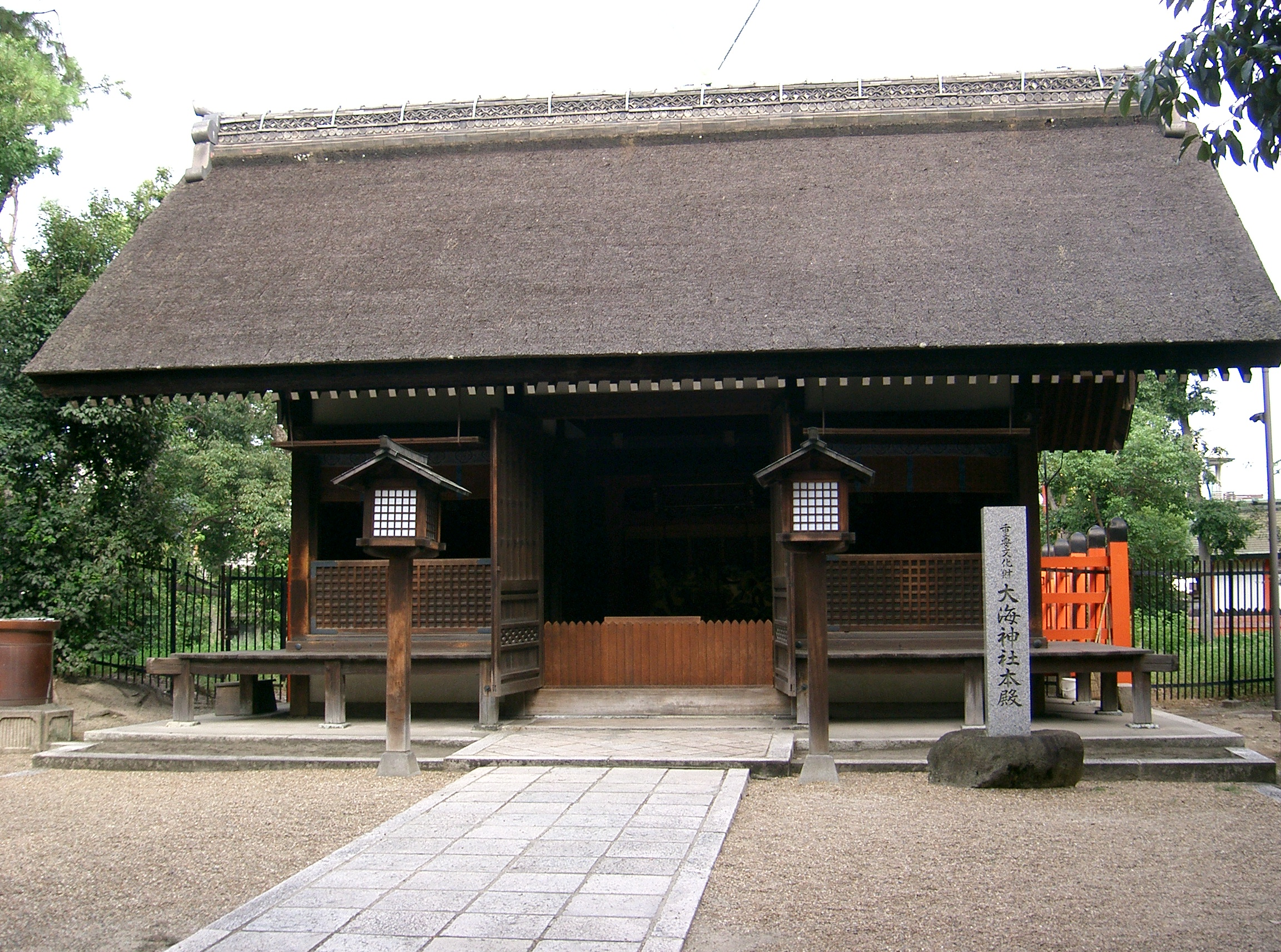
Watatsumi Shrine in Sumiyoshi-ku, Osaka

There are numerous Shinto shrines dedicated to the sea god Watatsumi. Some examples include the Ōwatatsumi jinja or Daikai jinja 大海神社 in Sumiyoshi-ku, Osaka (associated with the Sumiyoshi Taisha shrine), the Watatsumi Shrine 海神社 in Tarumi-ku, Kobe, and the Watatsumi jinja 綿都美神社 in Kokura Minami-ku, Kitakyūshū.

Shikaumi Shrine in Fukuoka

Kaijin Shrine at Tsushima

== Genealogy ==
Amaterasu	Takamimusubi
Ame-no-oshihomimi	Takuhadachiji-hime	Ōyamatsumi
Ninigi-no-Mikoto 天孫	Konohanasakuya-hime	Watatsumi
Hoderi	Hosuseri 海幸彦	Hoori 山幸彦	Toyotama-hime	Utsushihikanasaku	Furutama-no-mikoto
Tensori no Mikoto	Ugayafukiaezu	Tamayori-hime	Azumi people	Owari clan Yamato clan
Hayato people	Itsuse	Inahi	Mikeiri	Jimmu	Ahiratsu-hime
Imperial House of Japan	Tagishimimi

- Red background is female.
- Green background means groups
- Bold letters are three generations of Hyuga.

== Bibliography ==
- Aston, William George, tr. 1896. Nihongi: Chronicles of Japan from the Earliest Times to A.D. 697. 2 vols. Kegan Paul.
- Benedict, Paul K. 1990. Japanese/Austro-Tai. Karoma.
- Chamberlain, Basil H., tr. 1919. The Kojiki, Records of Ancient Matters. Asiatic Society of Japan.
- Visser, Marinus Willem de. 1913. The Dragon in China and Japan. J. Müller.
- Yamanouchi, Midori and Joseph L. Quinn, trs. 2000. Listen to the Voices from the Sea: Writings of the Fallen Japanese Students (Kike Wadatsumi no Koe). University of Scranton Press.
