= Kamuyaimimi =

Ancient Japanese Prince

- Born: unknown
- Died: April 4th Yamato Province
- Father: Jimmu
- Mother: Himetataraisuzu-hime

Kamuyaimimi (神八井耳命), is a figure in Japanese mythology and one of the three brothers born to Emperor Jimmu and his wife Himetataraisuzu-hime. He is best known for his role in the Assassination of Tagishimimi, in which he and his brother Suizei killed Tagishimimi in order to protect Suizei from assassination.

According to the Kojiki, Kamuyaimi-no-Mikoto was the elder brother of Suizei, and would have been expected to ascend the throne as emperor according to the lineage. However, he passed the throne on to his younger brother, Suizei, instead. This was seen as a humble and selfless act, similar to the "oath of subordination" between the brothers Yamayukihiko and Umiyukihiko.

Kamuyaimi-no-Mikoto is also connected to Aso Shrine, which is home to a deity named Takeban Ryujin (Taikei Watatsu). According to shrine lore, Takeban Ryujin is said to be a "child" of Kamuyaiminomikoto, and this is supported by the Kojiki, which states that "Aso-kun is a descendant of Kamuyaiminomikoto". He was an ancestor of the Aso clan

In addition to his role in the Assassination of Tagishimimi, Kamuyaimi-no-Mikoto is also known for his courage and leadership. When the princes heard of Tagishimimi's plan to assassinate Suizei, Kamuyaimi-no-Mikoto immediately tried to kill Tagishimimi, but his limbs trembled and he was unable to do so. His younger brother, Suizei, took his brother's weapon and went in to kill Tagishimimi instead.

== Historical records ==
According to historical records, the Yamato Imperial Court dispatched influential members of the imperial family to the area of Shinano Province in order to control the powerful Suwa no Kami, who was descended from the Izumo and Koshi gods, and also because the area was a strategic point between the Sea of Japan and the East. One of these imperial family members was Kamuyaimi-no-Mikoto, the ancestor of the Kuninomiyatsukos of Shinano and the son of Emperor Jimmu. Kamuyaimi-no-Mikoto is also mentioned in the Kojiki, an ancient record of Japanese history, as the one who firmly established the Emperor System.

The Kojiki also states that Kamuyaimi-no-Mikoto appointed Takeiotatsu no Mikoto, a grandson of Kamuyaimi-no-Mikoto, as the national governor. This appointment is believed to be the first time the king of Japan was appointed to the position of Kunizukuri. The palace of Shikinomizugaki was the palace of the 10th Emperor Sojin.

The family of Kamuyaimi-no-Mikoto is believed to have followed the four provincial generals, Ohiko-no-mikoto. The Shinano-no-kuninomiyatsukos are believed to have been buried in the Mori Shogunzuka burial mound, located on the opposite side of the Kawayanagi Shogunzuka burial mound.

Hase Shrine in Shiozaki, Shinanoi, Nagano City, is dedicated to Yaimimi no Mikoto, the ancestor of the Shinano-no-kuninozukuri. After the age of Shintoism and Buddhism, the shrine became Hase Kannon. Along with Hase Temple in Yamato and Kamakura, Hase Temple is known as one of the three Hase Kannon temples in Japan. The temple was founded during the reign of Emperor Seimei (reigned 629-641), the father of Emperor Tenchi, and is said to be the oldest Hase temple in Japan.

== Descendants ==
Kamuyaimi-no-Mikoto is also the ancestor of a very large number of clans, as mentioned in the Kojiki. These include the Iwa-no-Kunino-no-Miyatsuko of Hitachinoku, the Naka-no-Kunino-Miyatsuko of Hitachi, the Funaki-no-Atahi of Ise, the Niwa-no-Omi of Owari, and the Shimada-no-Minamoto, he is also said to be the ancestor of the Ō clan. and the Aso clan. The descendants of Kamuyaimimi-no-mikoto have left traces all over Japan, from Kyushu to the Tohoku region. They supported and solidified the "Emperor System" founded by Emperor Jinmu. Taian Manpo, who compiled the Kojiki, is a descendant of Kamuyaimi-no-Mikoto.

According to the Kojiki, Kamuyaimi-no-mikoto passed the imperial throne to his younger brother. The descendants of Kamuyaimi-no-Mikoto were in charge of the rituals at Aso Shrine and Suwa-taisha Shrine, which are considered the oldest power spots in the east and west of the Japanese archipelago.

== Family tree ==
A genealogical tree based on the Kojiki

	Himetataraisuzu-hime		Emperor Jimmu		Ahiratsu-hime
Kamuyaimimi		Hikoyai‡	Emperor Suizei	Tagishimimi	Kisumimi

‡ not in the Nihon Shoki

=== Aso genealogy ===
Emperor Jimmu
Kanakori no Kami	Kamuyaimimi no Mikoto	Kunitatsu no Kami	Hime Miko no Kami
Imperial Family Line	Takeiwatatsu no Mikoto	Asotsuhime no Mikoto	Shinhiko no Mikoto	Yahime no Kami
Hayamikatama no Mikoto	Wakahiko no kami	Shinhime no Mikoto
Wakahime no Kami	Hikomiko no Kami	Aso Shrine Extended Family
Current Aso Shrine Priests

== See also ==
- Hikoyai-mo-mikoto (彦八井耳命) - Some say that he was the brother, son, or the same person as Kamuyaimimi. Some also believe that he is the national dragon god enshrined at Aso Shrine.
