= Nitta Shrine =

Nitta Shrine may refer to:

- Nitta Shrine (Satsumasendai City)
- Nitta Shrine (Ōta)
