= Hoderi =

Deity in Japanese mythology

Genealogy
- Parents: Ninigi-no-Mikoto (father); Konohanasakuya-hime (mother)
- Siblings: Hosuseri; Hoori
- Children: Tensori no Mikoto

Umisachi-hiko (海佐知毘古/海幸彦), in Japanese mythology and folklore, was a deity of the bounty of the sea and enchanted fisherman.

He is called Hoderi no mikoto (火照命) in the Kojiki, and Ho-no-susori no mikoto (火闌降命) or Ho-no-suseri no mikoto (火酢芹命) in the Nihon Shoki.

In Japanese mythology, he appears with his younger brother Yamasachi-hiko (Hoori). When the fishhook he lent to his younger brother is lost at sea, he demands its return rather than accepting any compensation. Later, Hoderi is defeated after attacking Hoori (who has obtained mastery of the tides with a magic jewel) and vows to serve his younger brother forever onward.

== Genealogy ==
According to the Kojiki, Umisachi-hiko or Hoderi ("Fire Shine") was the eldest son of the god Ninigi and the blossom princess Konohanasakuya-hime, who gave birth to triplets. (Note: The prince is referred to only as "Hoderi" in the "Child-bearing" section (XXXVIII, Chamberlain). It is in the following section that Hoderi's byname of Umisachi-hiko (海佐知毘古) is given, but Chamberlain renders this not as a byname but as the statement "a prince who got his luck on the sea".)

The Nihon Shoki refers to the birth of the triplets redundantly several times, and the names are represented inconsistently. In the main text, the eldest is given as Ho-no-susori no-mikoto (火闌降[命]) (Note: Followed by Hiko-ho-ho-demi and Ho-no-akari) in one passage, and Ho-no-suseri (火酢芹[命]) (Note: Followed by Ho-no-akari and Hiko-ho-ho-demi. Note the transposition of name from the earlier passage.) in another. Either way, Ho-no-suseri is described as the one with the "sea-gift". One alternate text cited in Nihon Shoki makes him the middle brother.

The blossom princess Konohanasakuya-hime, with several aliases including Kamu-Ata-Tsu-Hime (神阿多都比売; "Princess-of-Ata"), announced her pregnancy after just one day of matrimonial relationship with Ninigi. Ninigi suspected the conception was not by him (the heavenly son), but had been previously fathered by one of the earth deities (kuni-tsu-kami). Offended by the suggestion, the princess sought to prove proper paternity by undergoing ordeal by fire: she declared she would seal herself up inside a maternity house, and set it aflame; then she avowed, may no child survive the birth if they were not of the seed of the divine Ninigi. Three children were born sound and hale, though they arrived at different hours, and the eldest born when fire was most intense became Hoderi, meaning "Fire Shine" (account according to Kojiki), The Nihon Shoki differs in saying the eldest son was born when the fire started, or when it was still smoldering, but the next son was born when the fire grew more intense. and as already noted, goes by the different name Ho-no-susori, perhaps meaning "flame skirt".

Hoderi is recorded in these ancient chronicles as the ancestor of hayato people of Aka (Satsuma and Ōsumi Provinces).

Amaterasu	Takamimusubi
Ame-no-oshihomimi	Takuhadachiji-hime	Ōyamatsumi
Ninigi-no-Mikoto （天孫）	Konohanasakuya-hime	Watatsumi
Hoderi	Hosuseri （海幸彦）	Hoori （山幸彦）	Toyotama-hime	Utsushihikanasaku	Furutama-no-mikoto
Tensori no Mikoto	Ugayafukiaezu	Tamayori-hime	Azumi people	（Owari clan Yamato clan)
Hayato people	Itsuse	Inahi	Mikeiri	Jimmu	Ahiratsu-hime
Imperial House of Japan	Tagishimimi

- Red background is female.
- Green background means groups
- Bold letters are three generations of Hyuga.

== Storyline ==
Hoderi grew to be a handsome youth along with his brother Hoori. His father, Ninigi, bequeathed onto his eldest son Hoderi a magic hook with the luck of the sea and bestowed on to his brother, Hoori, a magic bow to ensure both sons would be successful in each of their endeavors. With the gift of the magic hook, Hoderi spent most of his days fishing, at which he excelled. Hoderi saw that his brother Hoori, with his gift could go to the woods and hunt rain or shine, whereas he could not set his boat out to fish during any rain storm or heavy weather. Jealousy overwhelmed Hoderi and he insisted that his brother had the better of the two gifts and he being the older of the two should have the greater of the two gifts. Hoderi insisted that he and Hoori exchange gifts, thus Hoderi would then have the bow and become a hunter and his brother receive the hook and then be the more unfortunate one and become the fisherman. Hoori agreed to the exchange of two gifts in order to please his older brother.

While Hoderi was out hunting in the mountains his younger brother Hoori spent the day fishing and proved to be a meager fisherman and he even had the misfortune to lose his brother's magic hook. During this time Hoderi spent the entire day hunting in the woods with the magic bow and every time he drew the magic bow the arrow would miss its intended mark. Disappointed and furious, Hoderi demanded that they return each other's magic gifts to its rightful owner. Hoori revealed to his older brother that he had lost his magic hook. Upon hearing the news Hoderi became furious and demanded that his brother find and return his hook. Hoori could not find his brothers hook and took his own sword, which he held dear, and broke it to many pieces. With the fragments of his sword Hoori constructed 500 fishing hooks which he presented to his brother. With the absence of his magic hook only infuriated Hoderi more and he threatened to kill his own brother if he did not find his magic hook.

In searching for his brother's magic hook he fell in love with princess Toyotama-hime, daughter of Ōwatatsumi-no-kami, the dragon kami of the sea, and made her his wife. Hoori explained the circumstance with his brother to his father in law, who summoned all the fishes in the sea to his palace and found the lost hook for Hoori. Ōwatatsumi-no-kami gifted his new son in law with two jewels, one to raise tides and one to lower tides and had a spell put on the hook that would give bad luck to its user.

Upon seeing that his brother returned home Hoderi attacked his brother and Hoori countered his attack with the use of his jewel that raised the tide in order to make him drown. Hoderi, drowning because of the tide, pleaded to his brother to save his life, so Hoori used the other jewel to lower the tide and saved his brother’s life. Being saved by Hoori, Hoderi vowed to his brother that he and his descendants would then on serve his brother and his children for all eternity. Hoderi's descendants are the Hayato who guard the palace to this day.

== See also ==
- Udo-jingū (Shrine to venerate Ugayafukiaezu)
- Umisachi Yamasachi, an excursion train operated by JR Kyushu named for the legend
