= Ahiratsu-hime =

Wife of the first Japanese Emperor

Ahiratsuhime
- 吾平津媛
- Spouse: Emperor Jimmu
- Children: Tagishimimi, Kisumimi
- Father: Hosuseri

Ahiratsu-hime was the first wife of Emperor Jimmu, first Emperor of Japan. Jimmu later married Himetataraisuzu-hime who became the first Empress of Japan, and whose children inherited the throne. Her son Tagishimimi would attempt to seize power violently due to not inheriting the throne.

In the Kojiki, she is called Ahira-hime (吾平媛). According to the Nihon Shoki, she is from Hyūga Province.

Note that the -hime (媛) on the end is the word for "princess", and that tsu (津) appears in Old Japanese as the genitive particle, which was sometimes omitted from names.

== Genealogy ==
There is no mention of her parents in either the Nihon Shoki or the Kojiki.

According to the Kojiki, she is the sister of Ata no Wobashi no kimi (阿多之小椅君; lit. 'Lord Wobashi of Ata'). The Kojiki also lists one Hayato no Ata no kimi (隼人阿多君; lit. 'Lord Ata of the Hayato people') as a descendant of Hoderi. Meanwhile, according to the Genealogical Catalogue of the Ancient powerful families (古代豪族系図集覧) by Tositaka Kondo (近藤敏喬), her older brother is Amasori (天曽利), ancestor of Ata no Wobashi no kimi.

This Ata no Wobashi no kimi seems to be the same person as Ata no kimi Wobashi who appears in the Nihon Shoki as a descendant of Hosuseri. As such, some have pointed to a connection between this person and the Hayato people that also appear in the Nihon Shoki as descendants of Hosuseri.

- Husband: Emperor Jimmu - Nihon Shoki
- Emperor Jimmu - In the Nihon Shoki, he was the first Emperor of Japan (although he was not on the throne at the time and was a crown prince).
  - Child: Tagishimimi - Nihon Shoki
    After the fall of Emperor Jimmu, he was killed for his treason (Tagishimimi's treason) against Crown Prince Emperor Suizei.
  - Child: Kisumimi - mentioned in Kujiki as Ken-mimi. He is not mentioned in the Nihon Shoki.

=== Tree ===
Amaterasu	Takamimusubi
Ame-no-oshihomimi	Takuhadachiji-hime	Ōyamatsumi
Ninigi-no-Mikoto （天孫）	Konohanasakuya-hime	Watatsumi
Hoderi	Hosuseri （海幸彦）	Hoori （山幸彦）	Toyotama-hime	Utsushihikanasaku	Furutama-no-mikoto
Tensori no Mikoto	Ugayafukiaezu	Tamayori-hime	Azumi people	（Owari clan Yamato clan)
Hayato people	Itsuse	Inahi	Mikeiri	Jimmu	Ahiratsu-hime
Imperial House of Japan	Tagishimimi

- Red background is female.
- Green background means groups
- Bold letters are three generations of Hyuga.

== Records ==
According to Nihon Shoki, Emperor Jimmu (then a prince) took Princess Ohiraizu as his consort while he was in Hyūga before he made the Eastern Expedition.
