= Mikeirino no Mikoto =

Mythical brother of Japan's first Emperor

Genealogy
- Parents: Tamayori-hime (mother)
- Siblings: Emperor Jimmu

Mikeirino no Mikoto (Japanese: 三毛入野命) is a figure in Japanese mythology and kami said to be the son of Tamayori-hime and brother to Emperor Jimmu.
