= Tagishimimi =

Figure in Japanese mythology

- Born: unknown
- Died: Yamato Province
- Father: Jimmu
- Mother: Ahiratsu-hime

Tagishimimi-no-mikoto (手研耳命) was a semi-legendary figure in Japanese mythology. He was the son of Emperor Jimmu, the legendary founder of Japan, by one of his concubines, and he plotted to murder his half-brothers in order to inherit Jimmu's throne.

Tagishimimi was older than Jimmu's legitimate heir, Suizei, and given Tagishimimi's experience in statecraft, Suizei took his elder half-brother into his confidence and relied upon him as an advisor. However, Tagishimimi plotted against the young Emperor and made plans to murder both him and his brother, Prince Kamuyaimimi. The Emperor's mother (whom Tagishimimi had taken as a wife after the death of her first husband, his father) learned of the plot, and warned her sons by way of songs and poems. The Emperor had a bow and arrows made, and along with Prince Kamuyaimimi, surprised Tagishimimi. Kamuyaimimi was unable to shoot his half-brother, so the Emperor took the bow and killed Tagishimimi himself.

== Genealogy ==
A genealogical tree based on the Kojiki

	Himetataraisuzu-hime		Emperor Jimmu		Ahiratsu-hime
Kamuyaimimi		Hikoyai‡	Emperor Suizei	Tagishimimi	Kisumimi

‡ not in the Nihon Shoki
