= Hayato people =

Ancient ethnic group in southern Kyushu

- Tribe
- Ethnicity: Hayato
- Language: Unknown, possibly Austronesian or Japonic
- Religion: Indigenous religion
- Surnames: Hayato no suke

The Hayato (隼人), which is Japanese for "falcon-people", were a people of ancient Japan who lived in the Satsuma and Ōsumi regions of southern Kyushu during the Nara period. They frequently resisted the Yamato Kingship.

After their subjugation, they became subjects of the government under Ritsuryō, and the Ministry of the Military maintained an office known as the Hayato-shi (隼人司) responsible for their governance. The name also came into use by samurai as a title, Hayato no suke (隼人助).

In modern times, Hayato is a Japanese male given name.

== History ==
The Hayato might have been the same as the Kumaso group of around the same time, but while the Kumaso are mentioned in the more legendary portions of the Nihon Shoki, the Hayato are recorded in various historical texts until the beginning of the Heian period. Though the Kumaso are generally portrayed as rebellious, the Hayato are listed among the attendants of emperors and princes from as early as Emperor Nintoku's reign. This, along with a mention of Hayato crying before the grave of Emperor Yūryaku after his death, suggests that the Hayato were naturalized as personal servants by the late 7th century.

Even after pledging allegiance to the Japanese court, the Hayato continued to resist its rule. After the establishment of Ōsumi Province in 713, the Ōsumi Hayato fought back in 720 with the Hayato rebellion, but were defeated in 721 by an army led by Ōtomo no Tabito. The Handen-Shūju system was implemented in their lands in 800. The population of Yamato immigrants in Kagoshima Prefecture in the early 8th century has been estimated at approximately 9000, one-seventh of the total population. By this estimate, the Hayato population of the time can be calculated as consisting of around 54,000 people, not including Hayato emigrants to Honshū.

The Hayato were compelled to emigrate to the Kinai and were active in protecting the court, the arts, sumo, and bamboo work. Many lived in Yamashiro Province, in the south of modern Kyoto. There remains an area called Ōsumi (大住) in Kyōtanabe, Kyoto, where many Ōsumi Hayato lived. These were the Hayato governed by the Hayato-shi.

== Language ==
Hayato
- Extinct: 8th century AD
- Language family: Japonic? Austronesian?

Language codes
- ISO 639-3: None (mis)

The language spoken by the Hayato is not known, except for two words and several personal names documented in contemporary sources. In the Ōsumi Fudoki, an ancient Japanese text from the 8th century, two words from the Hayato language can be found: kusera (Man'yōgana: 久西良) and pisi (Man'yōgana: 必志). Kusera probably means "comb". Although the meaning "head hair" was suggested as well, the gloss 髪梳 ‘head.hair comb’ in the Ōsumi Fudoki strongly suggests the first meaning. The comparison with Old Japanese kusi (modern Japanese kushi 櫛) and Reconstructed Ryukyuan *kusi suggests borrowing from local Kyushu Old Japanese, as indicated by the diminutive suffix -ra. The second word, pisi 'shoal' is probably a native Hayato word. It suggests a common origin with adjacent languages for this word when compared with proto-Ryukyuan *pisi, proto-Ainu pis ("shore"), and Eastern Old Japanese pîⁿzi³. Despite efforts by some scholars, such as Kakubayashi in 1998, to associate these words with the Austronesian language family, the dominant perspective holds that the Hayato language was related to the Japonic languages. Nonetheless, it is thought to have diverged early from the languages spoken on the islands of Kyushu, Shikoku, and Honshu.

== Culture ==
Their culture is also believed to have been unique to other regions of Japan. In particular, their folk song and dance became famous in the Kinai region as the Hayato dance (隼人舞). An excavation of Heijō Palace discovered wooden shields with a distinctive reverse-S-shaped marking. These shields match those described in the Engishiki, which the Hayato used in court ceremonial functions. The Hayato performed roles in various state ceremonies, including those for the New Year, imperial enthronement, and the visitation of foreign officials.

According to the Fudoki of Hizen Province, the Gotō Islands were also inhabited by a people resembling the Hayato. The New Book of Tang describes a minor king of Haya (波邪), and this Haya has also been interpreted as referring to the Hayato.

There are three types of graves archaeologically associated with the Hayato: the tunnel tombs (地下式横穴墓) widely distributed around the border of Kagoshima and Miyazaki prefectures, the standing stone graves (立石土壙墓) of the southern Satsuma peninsula, and the underground stone-slab graves (地下式板石積石室) found north of the Satsuma peninsula. Another large group of tunnel tombs is located near the Ōsumi area of Kyōtanabe. Because of their proximity and because the area's gravelly soil is unsuitable for such tombs, these may also be associated with the Hayato.

In Japanese mythology, the deity Umisachihiko is considered the ancestor of the ruler of the Ata Hayato. The Hayato Dance may be intended to portray Umisachihiko's pain at being outdone by his younger brother Yamasachihiko.

A depiction of Hayato shield with the reverse-S-shaped marking

== Regional distribution ==
Ata Hayato (阿多隼人), or Satsuma Hayato
A Hayato tribe who lived on the Satsuma Peninsula. Before the establishment of Satsuma Province, the area was known as Ata. The Nihon Shoki's section on 682 calls them the Ata Hayato, while the section of the Shoku Nihongi on the year 709 refers to them as the Satsuma Hayato.

Ōsumi Hayato (大隅隼人)
A Hayato tribe who lived in the northern Ōsumi Peninsula, or by another theory the Kimotsuki plain region. They are mentioned in Nihon Shoki article on 682.

Tane Hayato (多褹隼人)
A Hayato tribe who lived in Tane Province. In 702, the court dispatched an army and conquered the region.

Koshiki Hayato (甑隼人)
A Hayato tribe who lived on the Koshikishima Islands. They are mentioned in the Shoku Nihongi's section on 769.

Hyūga Hayato (日向隼人)
A Hayato tribe who lived in Hyūga Province. The Shoku Nihongi records that in 710, their leader Sonokimi no Hosomaro (曾君細麻呂) submitted to the court and was awarded the rank of outside (外) ju go-i no ge (従五位下). However, this was before the separation of Ōsumi province from Hyūga Province in 713. The history of Usa Shrine records that later, in 719, the Ōsumi and Hyūga Hayato attacked Japan, perhaps a precursor to the rebellion of 720.

== Skeletal findings ==
Anthropological research on human skeletons of the Kofun period on southern Kyushu has shown that male skeletons found inland differ from those on the Miyazaki plain. Inland skeletons resembled those of Jōmon people and northwestern Kyushu Yayoi people, and some groups on the plain also resembled northern Kyushu Yayoi people. Additionally, skeletons excavated from late Yayoi-period ruins on Tanegashima are smaller than those found on Kyushu, and show signs of artificial cranial deformation.

== See also ==
- Hoderi, the ancestor of Hayato people in Japanese mythology
- Kumaso
