= Tamayori-hime (mother of Jimmu) =

Japanese kami

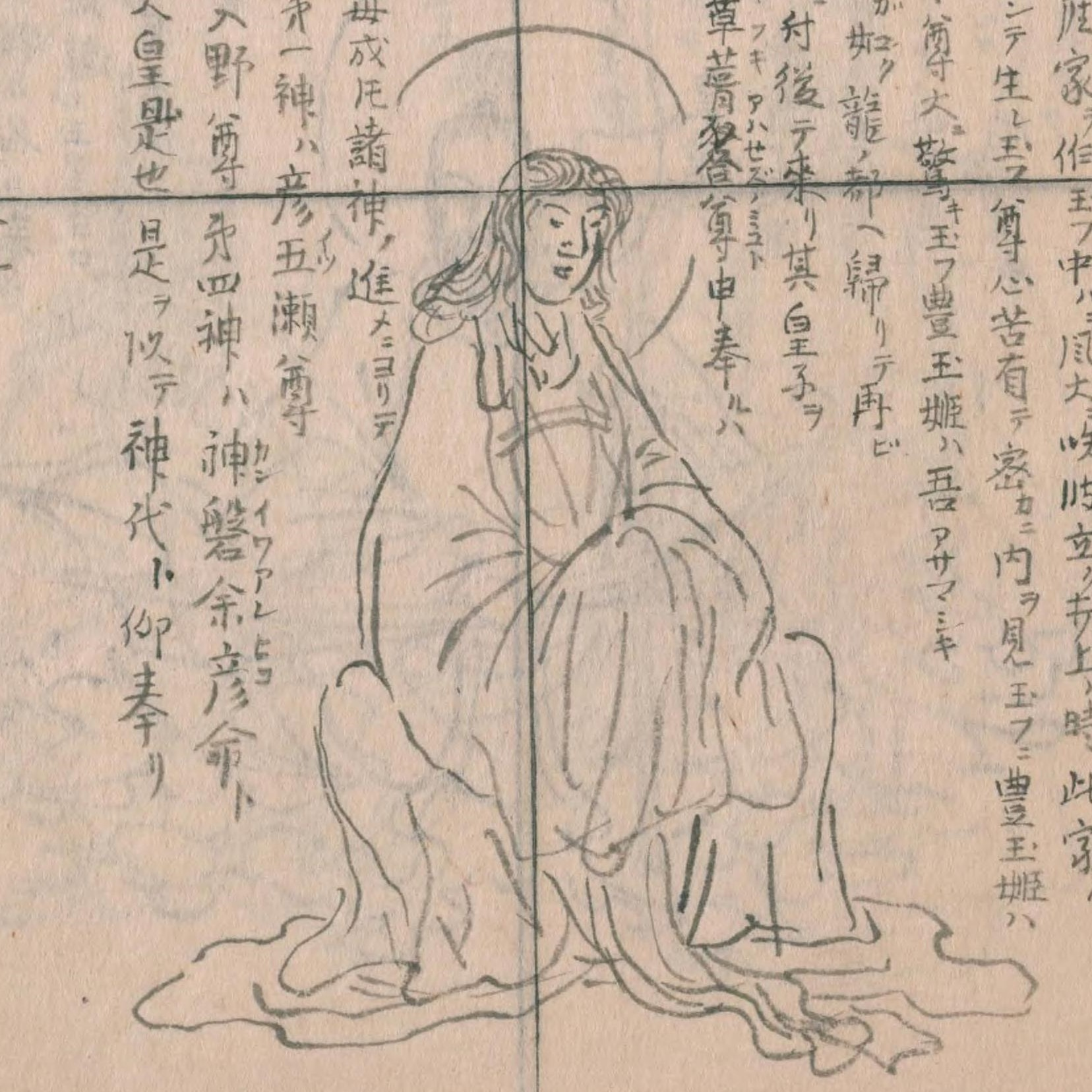

Genealogy
- Parents: Watatsumi (father)
- Siblings: Utsushihikanasaku; Toyotama-hime; Furutama-no-mikoto
- Consort: Ugayafukiaezu
- Children: Emperor Jimmu; Itsuse no Mikoto; Inahi no Mikoto; Mikeiri no Mikoto

Tamayori-hime is a goddess in Japanese mythology. Her name is spelled as 玉依毘売命 in the Kojiki and 玉依姫 in the Nihon Shoki.

Tamayori-hime is the daughter of the sea-dragon god Watatsumi and the younger sister of Toyotama-hime. When Toyotama-hime abandoned her husband Hoori, she sent Tamayori-hime to care for their son Ugayafukiaezu, although in the Nihon Shoki version of the legend, Tamayori-hime accompanies her sister to the human world when she was about to give birth. When the child grew up, he married his aunt, who bore him four children, the youngest of which became Emperor Jimmu, the first emperor of Japan.

== Summary ==
She is the mother of Emperor Jimmu (the first Emperor) and the sister of Toyotama-hime, the Emperor's grandmother. Toshio Akima of the International Research Centre for Japanese Studies considers it more likely that Tamayori-hime is not the sister of Toyotama-hime, but that the two should be considered as aspects of the same, single deity.

The word tamayori-hime is a generic term for shamanesses who dedicated their lives exclusively to their deities. The Japanese folklorist Kunio Yanagita espoused the view that tamayori-hime means "a consecrated women to whom a spirit descends" and that the intimate relationships between the two helped generate belief in mother-son pair deities. In addition, since the line of succession is based on grain spirits, and the sons of Tamayorihime are also named Gose no mikoto (厳稲の命), Inahiron no mikoto (稲氷の命), Mogonuma no mikoto (御食主の命), and Wakamogonuma no mikoto (若御食主の命), it is thought that they were priestesses who possessed grain spirits.

Miyaura Shrine (Miyazaki Prefecture Nichinan City) is said to be the site of Tamayorihime's residence. There is also a place in Miyazaki Prefecture Nichinan City that is said to be the mausoleum of Princess Tamayori.

At the Ryūkomyō Shrine, she is considered the ancestor of the Kaijin Tribe, which unites Ryujin, and the princess herself is worshipped as Ryujin.

== Genealogy ==
According to the Kiki, her father is Watatsumi. Her mother's name is unknown but her older sister is Toyotama-hime. The Yamato Shukune and Uminao genealogies in the Hyakuke Genealogy and the Shukune and Uminao genealogies in the Shukune and Uminao have Utsushihikanasaku (Hotakami-no-mikoto, ancestor of the Azumi people) and Furutama-no-mikoto (ancestor of the Owari Kuni-no-miyatsuko, Yamato no Kuni no Miyatsuko, etc.) as brothers. However, it is believed that Toyotama-hime and Tamayori-hime were sisters who became the wives of Hienori-no-mikoto, and based on genealogical comparisons with other clans, there is a theory that they were actually daughters rather than sisters of Utsushihikkinasei-no-mikoto. (see below).

- Husband: Ugayafukiaezu (in the Kojiki: 日子波限建鵜葺草合不合命) - "Nihonshoki"
  Son of Hoori.
  - Child: Itsuse no Mikoto (Mikoto Hikotose, Mikoto Gose in "Kojiki")-"Nihon Shoki"
    - He was killed by a bandit's arrow during the Jimmu's Eastern Expedition.
  - Son: Inahi no Mikoto (Inai-no-mikoto in Kojiki) - Nihon shoki
    - He went to Korea, but he became a plow god during the Jimmu's Eastern Expedition
  - Child: Mikeiri no Mikoto
  - Child: Jimmu

=== Different theories ===
- Husband: Hori-no-mikoto - Kujiki
  Son of Ninigi-no-Mikoto.
  - Child: Inauguration of Takeshi (Mikoto Takeiki, Mikoto Takekura)-"Kujiki Kujiki"
    The ancestor of Oya Kuni-no-miyatsuko . However, in " Kujiki Shinsen", Kunigami is treated as a territory, and in various genealogy, it is a child of Tamayori-hime's brother, Nunodome Tamayori. The article in "Kujiki Kunigami" seems to be a misrepresentation。

=== Family tree ===
Amaterasu	Takamimusubi
Ame-no-oshihomimi	Takuhadachiji-hime	Ōyamatsumi
Ninigi-no-Mikoto （天孫）	Konohanasakuya-hime	Watatsumi
Hoderi	Hosuseri （海幸彦）	Hoori （山幸彦）	Toyotama-hime	Utsushihikanasaku	Furutama-no-mikoto
Tensori no Mikoto	Ugayafukiaezu	Tamayori-hime	Azumi people	（Owari clan Yamato clan)
Hayato people	Itsuse	Inahi	Mikeiri	Jimmu	Ahiratsu-hime
Imperial House of Japan	Tagishimimi

- Red background is female.
- Green background means groups
- Bold letters are three generations of Hyuga.

== Examination ==
According to the Chronicles, Tamayori Biyori-no-mikoto's husband, Ukusabifune no Mikoto, was the grandson of Emperor Ninigi-no-mikoto, and Emperor Jimmu was his great-grandson. However, if we compare the generations of those who accompanied the descendants of the gods with those involved in the Jimmu East Expedition, we find that the Nakatomi-ren, Imbibe shu, Kume nao, and other related clans are always grandfather and grandson, and only the imperial lineage is somehow one generation older. However, intergenerational marriages between nephews and their aunts are rare and cannot be said to be a regular occurrence, and even in the few cases where they have occurred, there has never been a marriage with a mother's younger half-sister. This has led some to believe that the genealogy of Ukusa-thatching-furinushi-no-mikoto and Emperor Jimmu is a corruption of the tradition of sister marriages common among horsemen, and that Toyotamabihime and Tamayoribihime were sisters who married Hoori, with the former giving birth to Ugayafukiaezu and the latter to Emperor Jimmu and his siblings. According to this theory, Ukusabufurinushi-no-mikoto and Emperor Jimmu were both sons of Hiotorinushi-no-mikoto, making them half-brothers, and the number of generations is consistent with those of other related authors.

== Records ==
=== Kojiki ===
According to Kojiki, Toyotama-hime left her child (Ugayafukiaezu) after giving birth, but later sent her sister, Tamayoribirinomikoto, to offer her a song and provide for her child. Later, Ukagusabuhuri-no-mikoto married Tamayoribihime and had four children with her.

=== Nihon Shoki ===
According to the Nihon Shoki, Toyotama-hime came to the seashore from the sea to give birth to her child with Hoori, a thatch-thatched goddess, but at this time Toyotama-hime was accompanied by her sister, Tamayori-hime. Later, Tamayorihime became the consort of nephew of the goddess of thatched roofs (from Tamayorihime's point of view) and gave birth to four children.

According to the first sentence of the tenth section, after giving birth to her child, Toyotama-hime returned to the sea, leaving her child behind.

According to the third book, Toyotama-hime left her child at sea after giving birth, but later sent Tamayor-ihime to give a song to Fire Ori and nourish the king.

In the fourth book of the same name, the story goes that Toyotama-hime took the child in her arms and left for the sea after giving birth, but later sent Tamayori-hime to take the child in her arms and send her back to land.

=== The Old Chronicle of the First Age ===
According to the Old History of Japan, Toyotamahime-no-mikoto gave birth to a child, a child of Hiori-no-mikoto, and then left the child in her arms and went to the sea (or let Tamayori-hime-no-mikoto take care of the child and leave, and later let Tamayori-hime-no-mikoto take the child and send it to land). Later, Toyotama-hime no Mikoto sent Tamayorihime no Mikoto to give a song to Hiori no Mikoto, and have her feed the infant Kusabufuri no Mikoto. It was at this time that Tamayorihime no Mikoto and Hiori no Mikoto were born. Later, Tamayorihime-no-mikoto became the wife of the Goddess of Arms, whom she had nurtured, and gave birth to four children.

== Shrines ==
- Kirishima Jingu (Kirishima Taguchi, Kagoshima Prefecture, Kirishima City)
- Masukushinsha (Miyanoura, Kumage-gun, Yakushima Town, Kagoshima Prefecture)
- Shinden Shrine (Kagoshima Prefecture, Satsumasendai City, Miyauchi Town)
- Miyazaki Jingu (Jingu Shrine in Miyazaki Prefecture, Miyazaki City)
- Sawano Shrine (Takahara-cho, Nishimoro-gun, Miyazaki Prefecture)
- Kirishima Cenjinsha (Oaza Hosono, Kobayashi City, Miyazaki Prefecture)
- Takachiho Shrine (Miyazaki Prefecture, Nishi-usuki-gun, Takachiho Town)
- Higashi Kirishima Shrine (Miyazaki Prefecture, Miyakonojo City, Takasaki Town)
- Hakozaki Hachiman Shrine (Nagasaki Prefecture, Iki CityAshibe Town)
- Amate Nagao Shrine (Gounoura Town, Iki City, Nagasaki Prefecture)
- Amate Nagahime Shrine (Gounoura Town, Iki City, Nagasaki Prefecture)
- Tsu Shrine (Gonoura Town, Iki City, Nagasaki Prefecture)
- Tsu-no-Miya Shrine (Nagasaki Prefecture, Iki City, Ishida-cho)
- Otowatatami Shrine (Itsukushima-cho, Tsushima City, Nagasaki Prefecture)
- Kamikado Shrine (Fukuoka Prefecture, Dazaifu City)
- Ryuoh Shrine (Shimonoseki City, Yamaguchi Prefecture)
- Iwakuma Hachimangu Shrine (Iwakuni CityShuto Town, Yamaguchi Prefecture)
- Kumage Shrine (Aza-Katsuma, Oaza-Yobosaka, Shunan City, Yamaguchi Prefecture)
- Kachiya Shrine (Tottori Prefecture, Tottori City, Shikano Town)
- Asuri Shrine (Shimane Prefecture, Izumo City, Otsu Town)
- Tsutomu Shrine (Nishiringi-machi, Izumo City, Shimane Prefecture)
- Ezumi Shrine (Shimane Prefecture, Matsue City, Kashima Town)
- Uname Shrine (Tokushima Prefecture, Naga-gun, Naga-cho)
- Oyobi Shrine (Hyogo Prefecture, Yabu City, Miyake Aza Oyobi)
- Uobuki Hachiman Shrine (Miyauchi, Aboshi-ku, Himeji City, Hyogo Prefecture)
- Kaijinsha (in Wakayama Prefecture, Kinokawa City)
- Kamo Mikotojinja approaching Kawai Shrine (Kyoto Prefecture, Kyoto City Sakyo-ku)
- Runda Shrine precincts Benzaiten Shrine (Kameoka City, Yobe Town, Kyoto Prefecture)
- Tamayori Shrine (Kameoka City, Kyoto Prefecture, Higashi Betsuin-cho)
- Yoshino Moisture Shrine (Yoshino-gun, Yoshino-cho, Nara Prefecture)
- Chiryu Shrine (Aichi Prefecture, Chiryu City Nishimachi)
- Tamayorihime-no-mikoto Shrine (Nagano Prefecture, Nagano City, Matsudai Town)
- Kakuru Shrine (Shizuoka Prefecture, Hamamatsu City, Nishi-ku, Kamigaya-cho)
- Nakamiya Shrine on the grounds of Wakasa Hime Shrine (Obama City, Fukui Prefecture)
- Demizu Shrine (Ishikawa Prefecture, Kaga City, Hashidate Town)
- Ryukuchi Myojinja (Koshigoe, Kamakura City, Kanagawa Prefecture)
- Tamasaki Shrine (Chiba Prefecture, Asahi City Iioka)
- Tamamae Shrine (Chiba Prefecture, Chosei-gun, Ichinomiya Town)
- Isobe Inamura Shrine (Ibaraki Prefecture, Sakuragawa City, Isobe Aza Inaoki)
- Shikitama Hayamitama Shrine (Miyagi Prefecture, Osaki City, Furukawa Nuriki Aza Suwa)
- Wakamiya Hachiman Shrine precincts of Shikitama Hayamitama Shrine (Wakamiya, Aza-Wakamiya, Shinnuma, Sanbongi, Osaki City, Miyagi Prefecture)

== See also ==
- List of Japanese gods
- Tamayoribime

=== Hyuga mythological lineage ===
- Miyazaki Shrine
- Yoshino Mikumari Shrine

=== Yahata belief system ===
- Hakozaki Shrine
- Hiiro no Kakera
- Kamado-jinja
- Kamado Shrine
- Kamigamo Shrine
- Kamo Shrine
- Miyazaki-jingū
- Shimogamo Shrine
- Yoshino Mikumari Shrine
