= Inahi no Mikoto =

Japanese mythological character

Genealogy
- Parents: Ugayafukiaezu (father); Tamayori-hime (mother)
- Siblings: Emperor Jimmu; Itsuse no Mikoto; Mikeiri no Mikoto

Inahi no Mikoto (Japanese: 稲飯命, 741-681 BC according to traditional dating) was a Japanese legendary character. In Japanese traditional mythology, he was a brother of Emperor Jimmu, the first Emperor who according to tradition lived in the 7th century BC. His name Inahi means "boiled rice".

== Connections to Korea ==
According to the Kojiki, he became a king over part of Korea which is speculated to be near the Kaya confederacy.

However, according to the Shinsen Shōjiroku, it is stated that he and the kings of Silla shared the same lineage. The kings or their lineages were never specified.

『是出於新良國。即為國主。稻飯命出於新羅國王者祖合。』

"He is from the kingdom of Silla. A ruler. Inahi no Mikoto is the ancestor to the kings of Silla."

— Shinsen Shōjiroku

The authenticity of the claim is considered vague and obscure as the record does not specify a name or a dynasty of which the Japanese god became the ancestor to the kings of Silla. However, it is quite likely that the book is alluding to Silla kings who were indeed of Japanese descent such as Talhae of Silla (though the claim is sometimes disputed) (Note: The dispute arises from the claim found in the Samguk sagi which states he comes from the kingdom of "Dapana (多婆那國; 다파나국)" that is "1000 li (Chinese mile) northeast from the kingdom of Wa (Japan)". Korean historians posit that the location would be too far from Japan while Japanese historians support his Japanese origin. A more recent theory posits that he was in fact an Ainu individual and not Yamato.) and the grandchild of Heulhae of Silla, who was born from the daughter of Heulhae and the prince of Japan (believed to be the son of Ugayafukiaezu) in 312 CE. Interestingly, it is said that Inahi no Mikoto was one of the four sons of Ugayafukiaezu, and with the claim stating that Inahi was the ancestor to the kings of Silla, it can be speculated that Heulhae's grandson was Inahi no Mikoto's child. However, these are historical sources found only in Korea and not in Japan. Moreover, Heulhae's line (the Gyeongju Seok clan) ended with his successor, Naemul of Silla, who was a Gyeongju Kim clan, which makes the claim of the ownership of the kings of Silla after Heulhae questionable as they descended from different families.

Due to the lack of historical evidence found in Japan, modern Japanese scholars began cross-referencing other sources that may act as a bridge to the claim found in the Shinsen Shōjiroku. According to historian Takehiko Furuta, a legendary Japanese sword called "Ame no Habakiri (天羽々斬; あめのはばきり)" had an alternate name called "Orochi no Karasahi (蛇之韓鋤; をろちのからさひ)"; he posited that "Karasahi (韓鋤)" was most likely a loanword from Korean as "Kara (韓)" meant "Korea" and "hi (鋤)" meant "to cut", deriving from the native Korean verb "bi- (비-); be- (베-)" which also means "to cut". Similar observation was made by Furuta on the name "Masahi (馬射戲; まさひ)", a traditional Japanese horse-riding archery event that has roots in the kingdom of Goguryeo, pointing out that the "hi" found in "Masahi" shares the same sentiment found in "Karasahi".

The kingdom of Goguryeo's founder, Dongmyeong's story was compared with the story found in the Japanese mythology surrounding Inahi no Mikoto by the historian and mythologist, Shōei Mishina. Mishina posited that King Dongmyeong's founding story aligned closely with Inahi no Mikoto's own background; that due to the stories surrounding Inahi no Mikoto and Korea (Silla and Goguryeo) were very similar in nature, he stated that the two were clearly related. His argument was incorporated into the Nissen dōsoron.

== Genealogy ==
Amaterasu	Takamimusubi
Ame-no-oshihomimi	Takuhadachiji-hime	Ōyamatsumi
Ninigi-no-Mikoto （天孫）	Konohanasakuya-hime	Watatsumi
Hoderi	Hosuseri （海幸彦）	Hoori （山幸彦）	Toyotama-hime	Utsushihikanasaku	Furutama-no-mikoto
Tensori no Mikoto	Ugayafukiaezu	Tamayori-hime	Azumi people	（Owari clan Yamato clan)
Hayato people	Itsuse	Inahi	Mikeiri	Jimmu	Ahiratsu-hime
Imperial House of Japan	Tagishimimi

- Red background is female.
- Green background means groups
- Bold letters are three generations of Hyuga.
