= Ugayafukiaezu =

Figure in Japanese mythology and Shinto

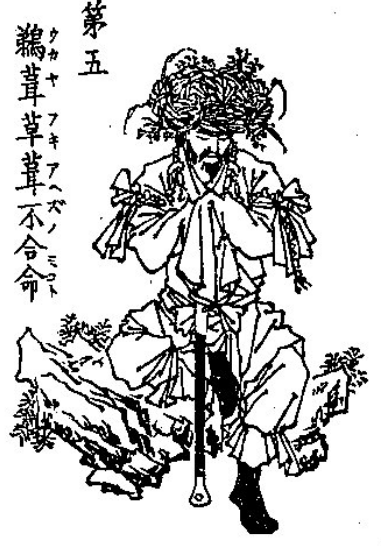
- Predecessor: Hoori
- Successor: Jimmu

Genealogy
- Born: 736 BCE (mythical)
- Died: 660 BCE (mythical)
- Parents: Hoori (father); Toyotama-hime (mother)
- Consort: Tamayori-hime
- Children: Emperor Jimmu; Itsuse no Mikoto; Inahi no Mikoto; Mikeiri no Mikoto

Ugayafukiaezu no Mikoto (鵜葺草葺不合命) is a Shinto kami, and is in Japanese mythology, the father of Japan's first Emperor, Emperor Jimmu.

== Nomenclature and story ==
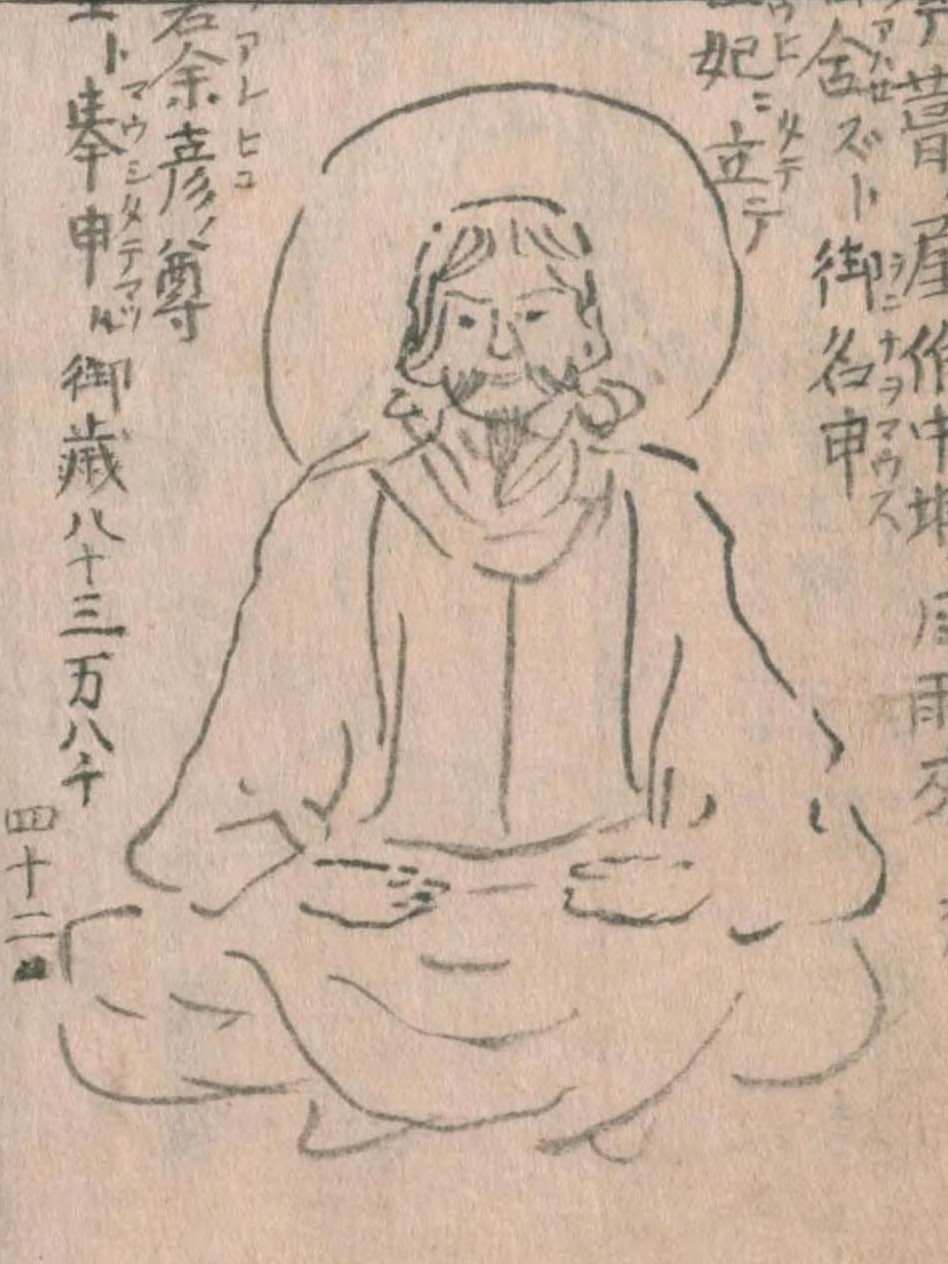

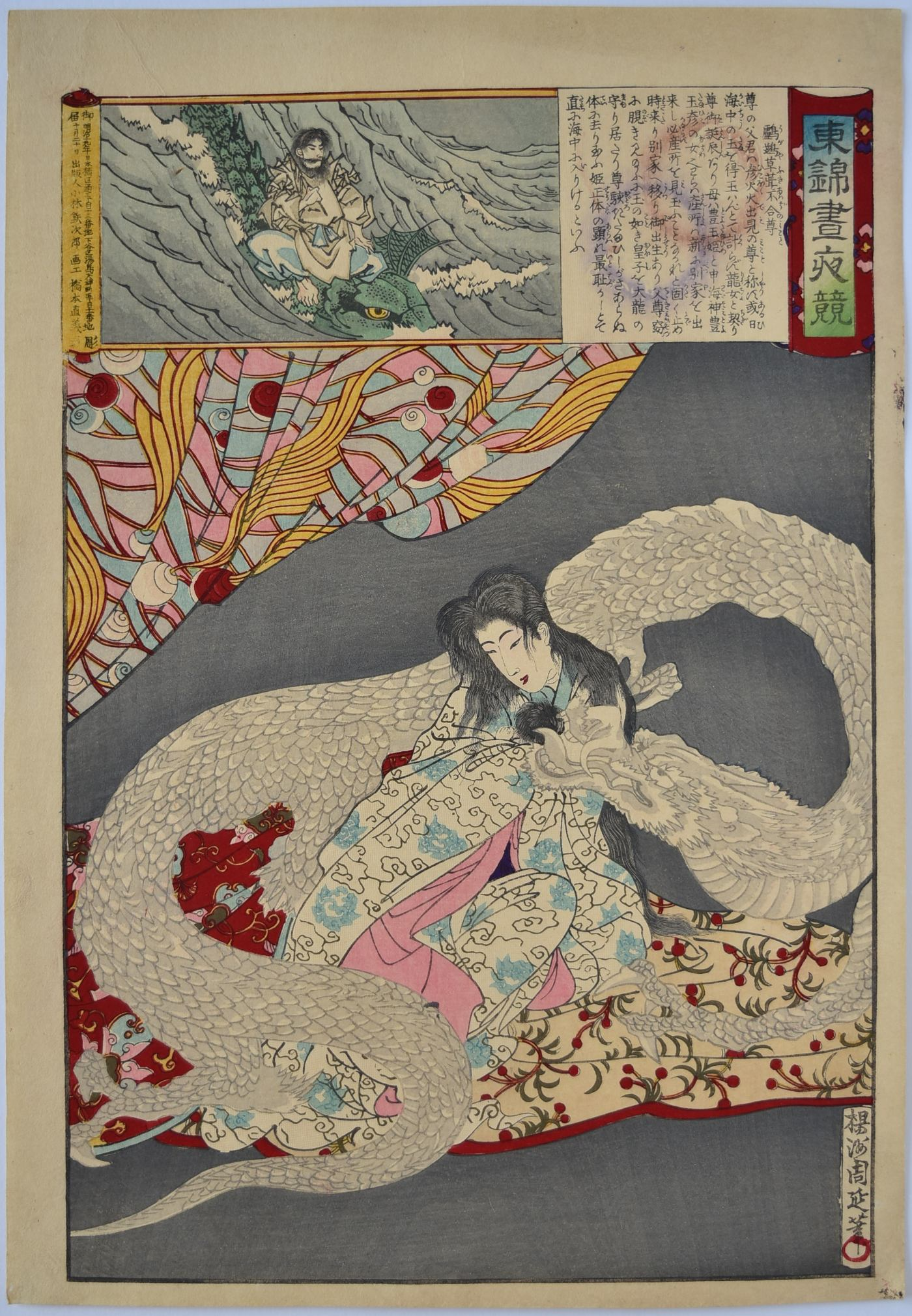
Toyotama-hime giving birth to Ugayafukiaezu by turning herself into a wani in an 1886 illustration

In the Kojiki, his name appears as Amatsuhiko Hiko Nagisatake Ugayafukiaezu no Mikoto (天津日高日子波限建鵜葺草葺不合命), and in the Nihon Shoki as Hiko Nagisatake Ugayafukiaezu no Mikoto (彦波瀲武鸕鶿草葺不合尊). Basil Hall Chamberlain glossed the Kojiki name as "His Augustness Heaven's-Sun-Height-Prince-Wave-limit-Brave-Cormorant-Thatch-Meeting-Incompletely". 'no Mikoto' here is an honorific, denoting divinity or royalty.

Ugayafukiaezu was a child of Hoori, the son of Ninigi-no-Mikoto, who was sent down by Amaterasu to govern the earth (Ashihara no Nakatsukuni) (believed to be equivalent to Japan), and of Toyotama-hime, a daughter of Ryūjin, the dragon kami of the sea.

Although Toyotama-hime became pregnant at the undersea palace of Ryūgū-jō, she opted not to bear the child in the ocean and decided to head to shore.

On the shore, her parents attempted to build a house in which she could give birth, and attempted to construct the roof with feathers of the cormorant instead of saw grass. However, while they were finishing the roof, she went into labor.

And so just as she was about to give birth, she spoke to her husband, saying:

"When their time draws near, people of other lands all give birth in the form of their homeland. So I will now give birth in my original form. Please, I beg you, do not look at me!"

Now, thinking these words strange, he sneaked up and peered in at her just as she was about to give birth.

She had become an enormous sea beast many arm spans in length that was twisting and slithering around on its stomach.

In shock and fright at the sight of her, he immediately fled far away.

In shame, Toyotama-hime fled, leaving behind her newborn, whom she called Ugayafukiaezu. The roof of the birthing hut had not been completely thatched (fukiaezu) with cormorant feathers (ugaya) when his mother gave birth to him, which explains his name.

Later, when Ugayafukiaezu reached adulthood, he married his aunt, Tamayori-hime, and they had four children: Hikoitsuse, Inai, Mikeirinu, and Hikohohodemi (later Emperor Jimmu).

Mikeirinu traveled to Tokoyo no kuni, the "Everworld", and Inai went into the ocean to be with his mother. The eldest and youngest set forth to rule the land and while they did so together for a time, after Hikoitsuse died, their youngest became the first ruler.

== Genealogy ==
Ugayafukiaezu is in the Three generations of Hyuga, a time period between Tenson kōrin and Jimmu's Eastern Expedition.

Amaterasu	Takamimusubi
Ame-no-oshihomimi	Takuhadachiji-hime	Ōyamatsumi
Ninigi-no-Mikoto 天孫	Konohanasakuya-hime	Watatsumi
Hoderi	Hosuseri 海幸彦	Hoori 山幸彦	Toyotama-hime	Utsushihikanasaku	Furutama-no-mikoto
Tensori no Mikoto	Ugayafukiaezu	Tamayori-hime	Azumi people	Owari clan Yamato clan
Hayato people	Itsuse	Inahi	Mikeiri	Jimmu	Ahiratsu-hime
Imperial House of Japan	Tagishimimi

- Red background is female.
- Green background means groups
- Bold letters are three generations of Hyuga.
