= Hyūga-Shintomi Station =

Railway station in Shintomi, Miyazaki Prefecture, Japan

Hyūga-Shintomi Station 日向新富駅
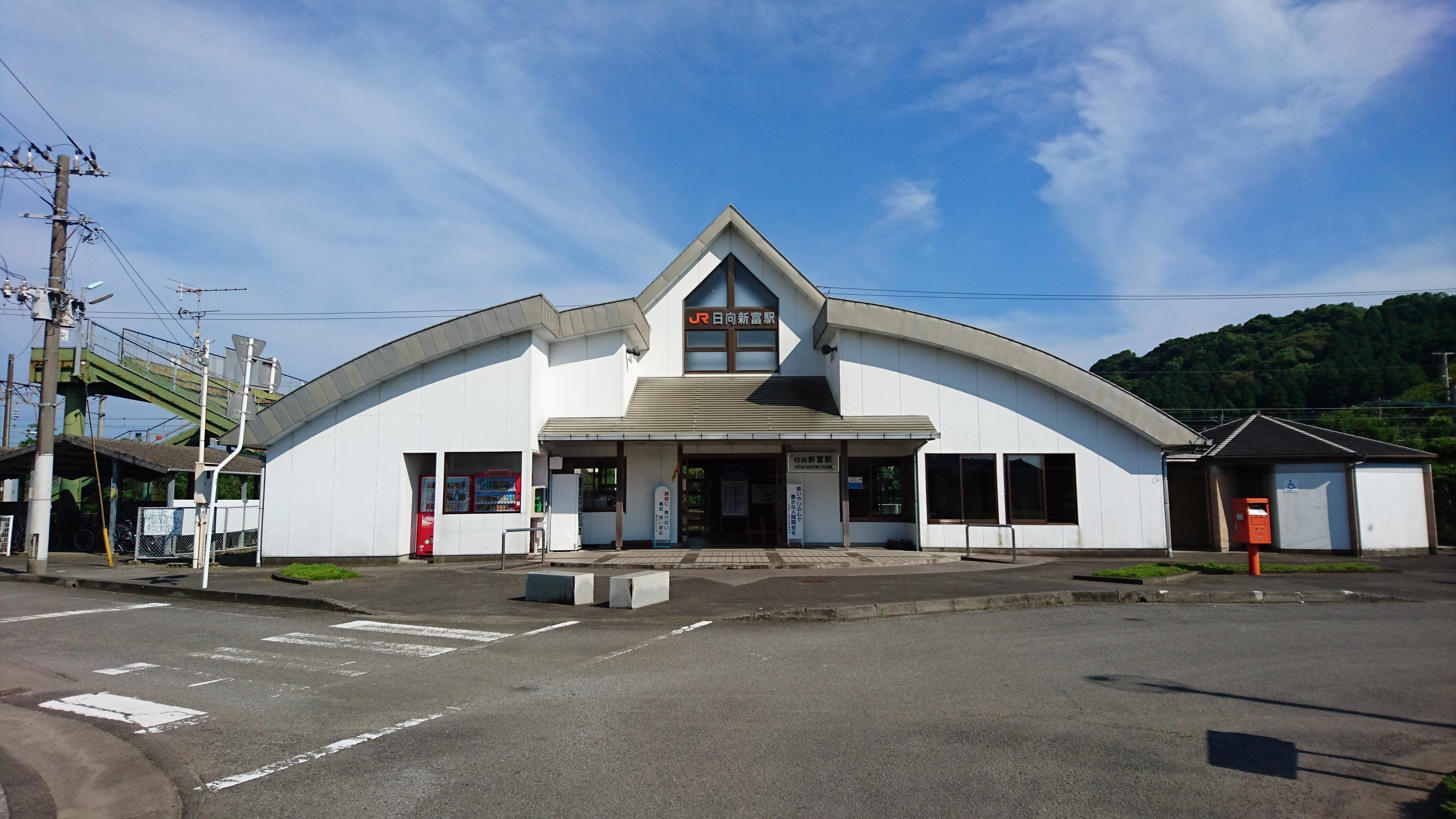
- Hyūga-Shintomi Station in 2016

General information
- Location: Minashiro, Shintomi-cho, Koyu-gun, Miyazaki-ken 889-1402; Japan
- Coordinates: 32°04′20″N 131°30′04″E
- Operator: JR Kyushu
- Line: ■ Nippō Main Line
- Distance: 320.0 km from Kokura
- Platforms: 1 island platform
- Tracks: 2 + 2 sidings

Construction
- Structure type: At grade
- Cycle facilities: Bike shed
- Accessible: No - footbridge to island platform

Other information
- Status: Kan'i itaku agent on site
- Website: Official website

History
- Opened: 11 September 1920
- Former names: Minashiro (until 20 March 1961)

Passengers
- FY2016: 287 daily

Services
| Preceding station | JR Kyushu | Following station |
|---|---|---|
| Sadowara towards Kagoshima | Nippō Main Line | Takanabe towards Kokura |
Location
- Location within Miyazaki Prefecture Location within Japan

Hyūga-Shintomi Station (日向新富駅, Hyūga-Shintomi-eki) is a passenger railway station located in the town of Shintomi, Miyazaki, Japan. It is operated by JR Kyushu and is on the Nippō Main Line.

== Lines ==
The station is served by the Nippō Main Line and is located 320.0 km from the starting point of the line at Kokura.

== Layout ==
The station consists of an island platform serving two tracks at grade with two sidings. The station building is modern structure built in 1992 from local materials and designed with elements to resemble the town logo as well as an agricultural greenhouse, recalling the key economic activity of the town. It houses a staffed ticket window and a waiting area. Access to the island platform is by means of a footbridge. A bike shed is provided at the station forecourt. The station is not staffed by JR Kyushu but some types of tickets are available from a kan'i itaku agent on site who staffs the ticket window.

=== Platforms ===
| 1 | ■ ■ Nippō Main Line | for Nobeoka |
| 2 | ■ ■ Nippō Main Line | for Miyazaki |

== History ==
In 1913, the Miyazaki Prefectural Railway (宮崎県営鉄道) had opened a line from Miyazaki northwards to Hirose (now closed). After the Miyazaki Prefectural Railway was nationalized on 21 September 1917, Japanese Government Railways (JGR) undertook the subsequent extension of the track as part of the then Miyazaki Main Line. In the first phase of expansion, the track was extended north from Jirogabyū (now Hyūga-Sumiyoshi to Takanabe which opened on 11 September 1920 as the new northern terminus. This station, at the time known as Minashiro (三納代) was opened on the same day as an intermediate station on the new track. Expanding north from Takanabe in phases and joining up with other networks, the track eventually reached Kokura and the entire stretch from Kokura through this station to Miyakonojō was redesignated as the Nippō Main Line on 15 December 1923. On 20 March 1961, the station was renamed from Minashiro to Hyūga-Shintomi. Freight operations were discontinued in 1982 and baggage handling in 1984. With the privatization of Japanese National Railways (JNR), the successor of JGR, on 1 April 1987, the station came under the control of JR Kyushu.

== Passenger statistics ==
In fiscal 2016, the station was used by an average of 287 passengers (boarding only) per day.

== Surrounding area ==
- JASDF Nyutabaru Air Base - 5 km to the west of the station. A Lockheed T-33 trainer aircraft is on display outside the station building. It belonged to the 202nd Tactical Fighter Squadron (JASDF) which was stationed at Nyutabaru.
- Japan National Route 10
- Shintomi Town Hall

== See also ==
- List of railway stations in Japan
