= Nigihayahi =

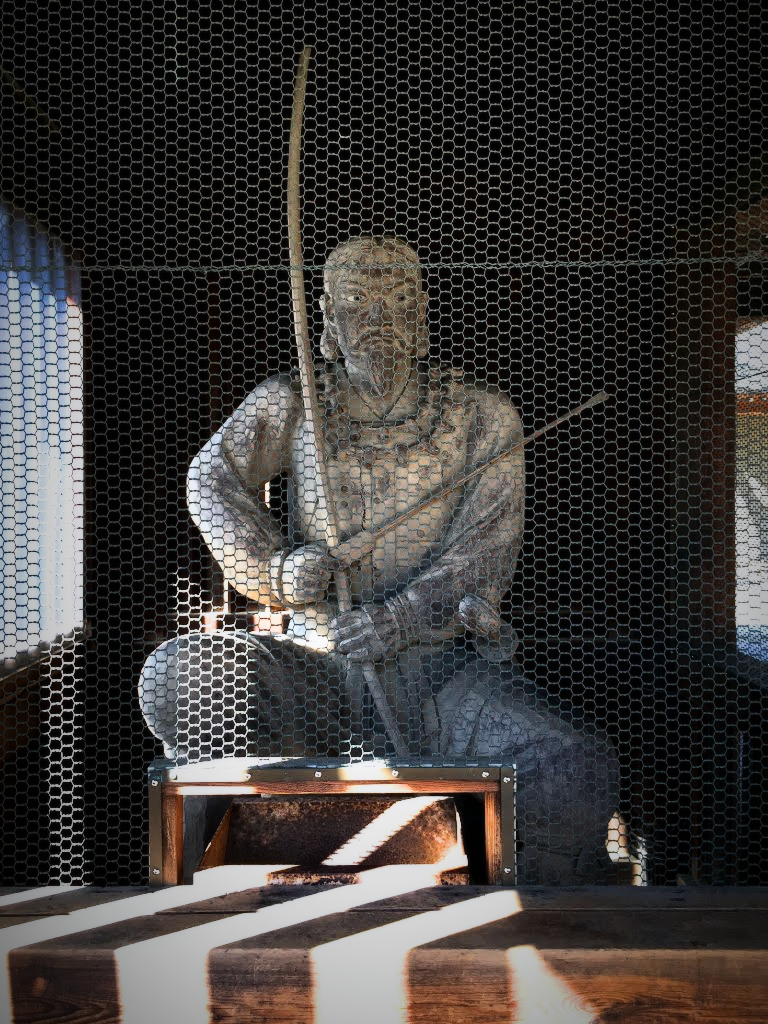
- Statue of Nigihayahi

Genealogy
- Parents: Ame-no-oshihomimi (father)

Nigihayahi is a Japanese god. He is mentioned in the Kojiki, Kujiki, and Nihon Shoki. He appears in the legend of Jimmu's Eastern Expedition, killing Nagasunehiko, a follower and the brother-in-law of Nigihayahi, and submitting to Jimmu.

== Background ==
He was involved with the Tenson Korin (descent of gods from Heaven). The Mononobe clan and the Hozumi clan state he was their ancestor. According to the Nihongi and Kujiki, Nigihayahi came down from heaven in the "heavenly rock boat," after which he married Mikashigiyahime, Nagasunehiko's younger sister. Nigihayahi was accompanied by 25 deities who are said to be ancestors of Monobe lineages. In the Kojiki, Nigihayahi marries Tomiyahime instead.

According to the Kujiki, Nigihayahi ruled over Yamato with the help of Nagasunehiko. He died before his son, Umashimaji, was born. Takamimusubi then sent for the whirlwind god to transport Nigihayahi's corpse back to heaven for a funeral.

The Kujiki says he is the same god as Amenohoakari but this is questionable. The book is considered a forgery.

Some books say he is the older brother of Ninigi, or the son of Ame-no-oshihomimi. Some scholars believe his myth comes from Korea.

== Jimmu's Eastern Expedition ==
During Jimmu's Eastern Expedition, Jimmu and his brothers reached Osaka, they encountered a chieftain named Nagasunehiko ("the long-legged man"). They fought and Itsuse was killed in the ensuing battle.

Nagasunehiko claimed to follow Nigihayahi. Nagasunehiko believed that Nigihayahi was the only descendent of the sun goddess, and that Jimmu was an impostor. Nagasunehiko then sent a letter to Jimmu accusing him of being an impostor and showed Jimmu proof of Nigihayahi descending from the sun goddess. Despite Jimmu also showing proof that he descended from the sun goddess, Nagasunehiko did not want to stop fighting. Considering Jimmu was the lineal descendent of the sun goddess, Nigihayahi ordered Nagasunehiko to surrender. After he disobeyed this order, Nigihayahi killed Nagasunehiko and submitted to Jimmu. Nigihayahi used his moral obligations and loyalty to justify his killing of Nagasunehiko.

== In popular culture ==
He is present in Ghost of Tsushima.
