= Miyazaki-Jingū Station =

Railway station in Miyazaki, Miyazaki Prefecture, Japan

Miyazaki-Jingū Station 宮崎神宮駅
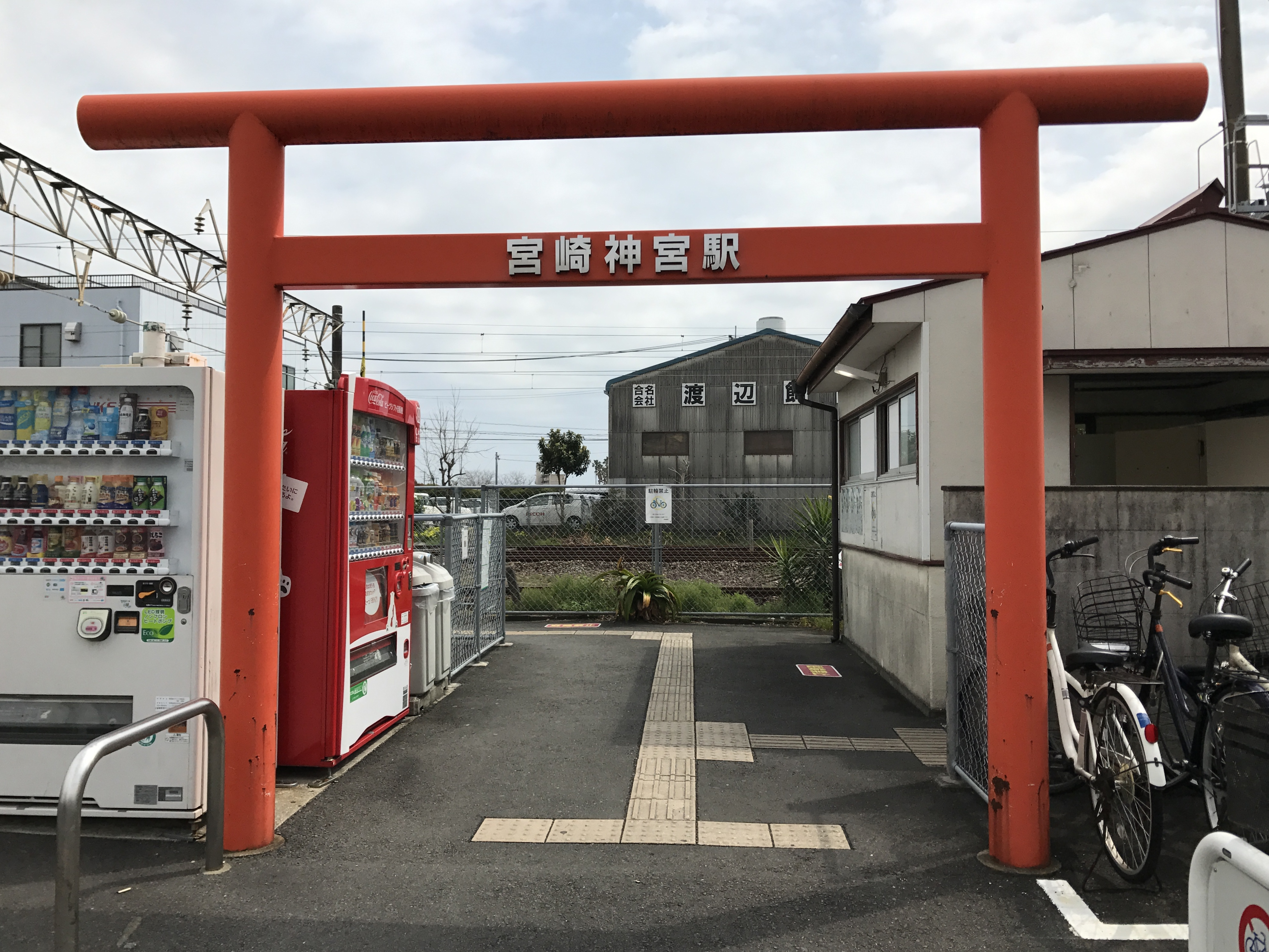
- Entrance of Miyazaki-Jingū Station in 2017

General information
- Location: 3-chōme-1 Jingūhigashi, Miyazaki-shi, Miyazaki-ken 880-0056; Japan
- Coordinates: 31°56′18″N 131°25′50″E
- Operator: JR Kyushu
- Line: ■ Nippō Main Line
- Distance: 337.4 km from Kokura
- Platforms: 1 island platform
- Tracks: 2 + 2 sidings

Construction
- Structure type: At grade
- Cycle facilities: Designated parking area for bicycles
- Accessible: Yes - level crossing and ramp to platform

Other information
- Status: Unstaffed
- Website: Official website

History
- Opened: 15 December 1913
- Former names: Hanagajima (until 10 November 1954)

Passengers
- FY2016: 542 daily
- Rank: 235th (among JR Kyushu stations)

Services
Preceding station	JR Kyushu	Following station
Miyazaki towards Kagoshima	Nippō Main Line	Hasugaike towards Kokura
Location
- Location within Miyazaki Prefecture Location within Japan

Miyazaki-Jingū Station (宮崎神宮駅, Miyazaki-Jingū-eki) is a passenger railway station located in Miyazaki City, Miyazaki Prefecture, Japan. It is operated by JR Kyushu and is on the Nippō Main Line.

== Lines ==
The station is served by the Nippō Main Line and is located 337.4 km from the starting point of the line at Kokura.

== Layout ==
The station, which is unstaffed, consists of an island platform serving two tracks at grade with two sidings beyond platform/track 2. There is no station building but an enclosed waiting room housing an automatic ticket vending machine has been set up under the canopy of the island platform. A red torii stands at the station entrance, recalling the nearby Miyazaki-jingū shrine. Access to the island platform from the station entrance is by means of a level crossing with a ramp.

=== Platforms ===
1	■ ■ Nippō Main Line	for Nobeoka and Saiki
2	■ ■ Nippō Main Line	for Miyakonojō, Miyazaki and Miyazaki Airport

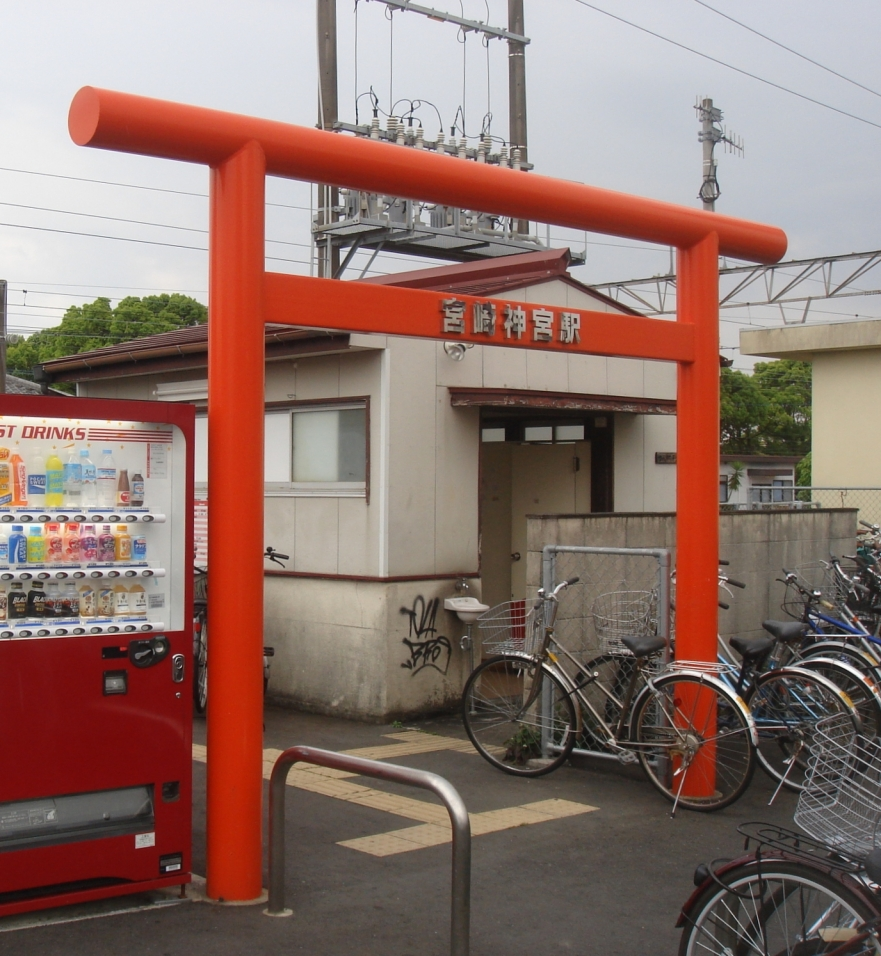
Another view of the station entrance. The concrete structure behind the torii is not the station building but a toilet.

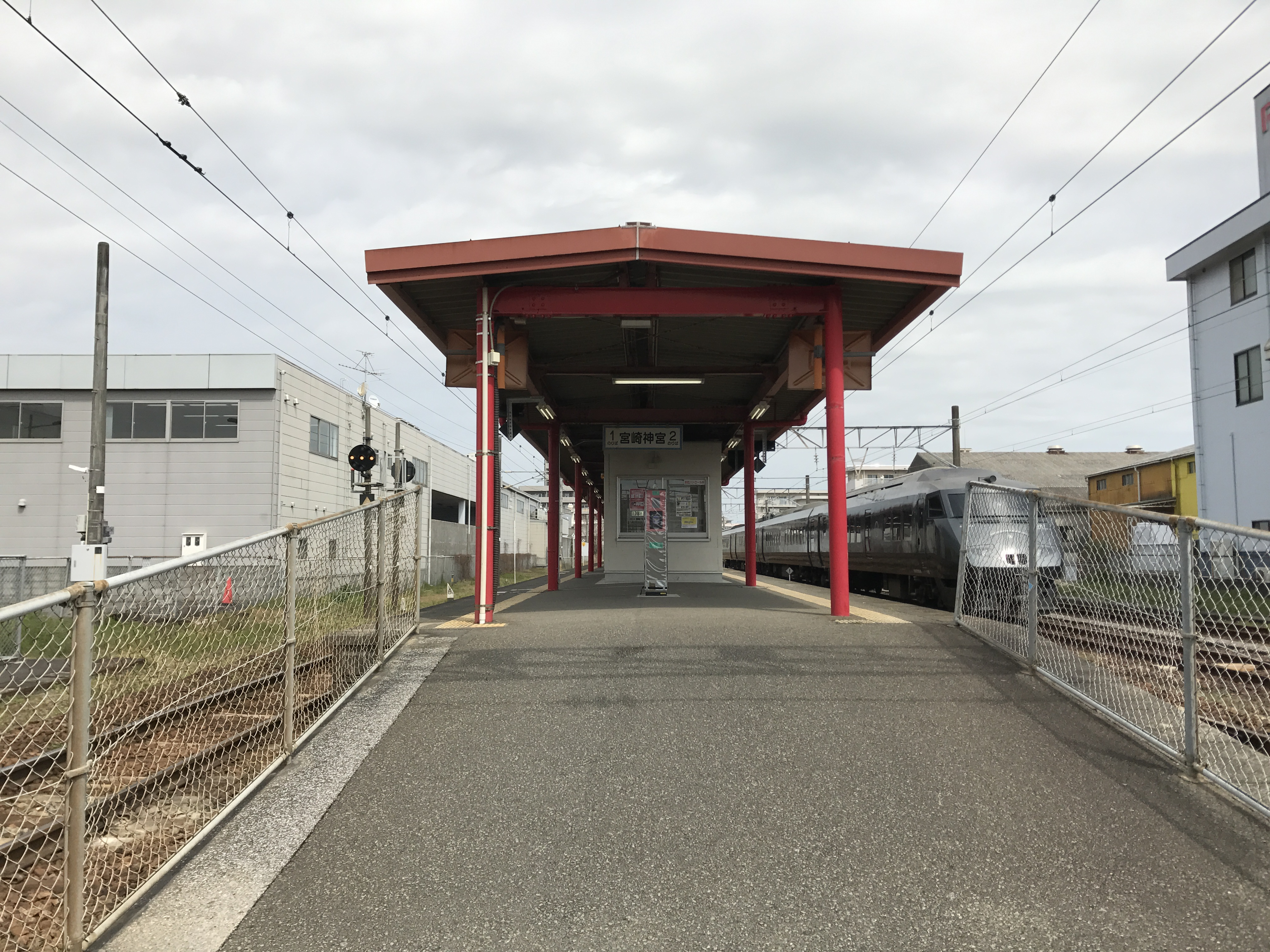
A view of the island platform. Note the Sugoca card reader and the waiting room.

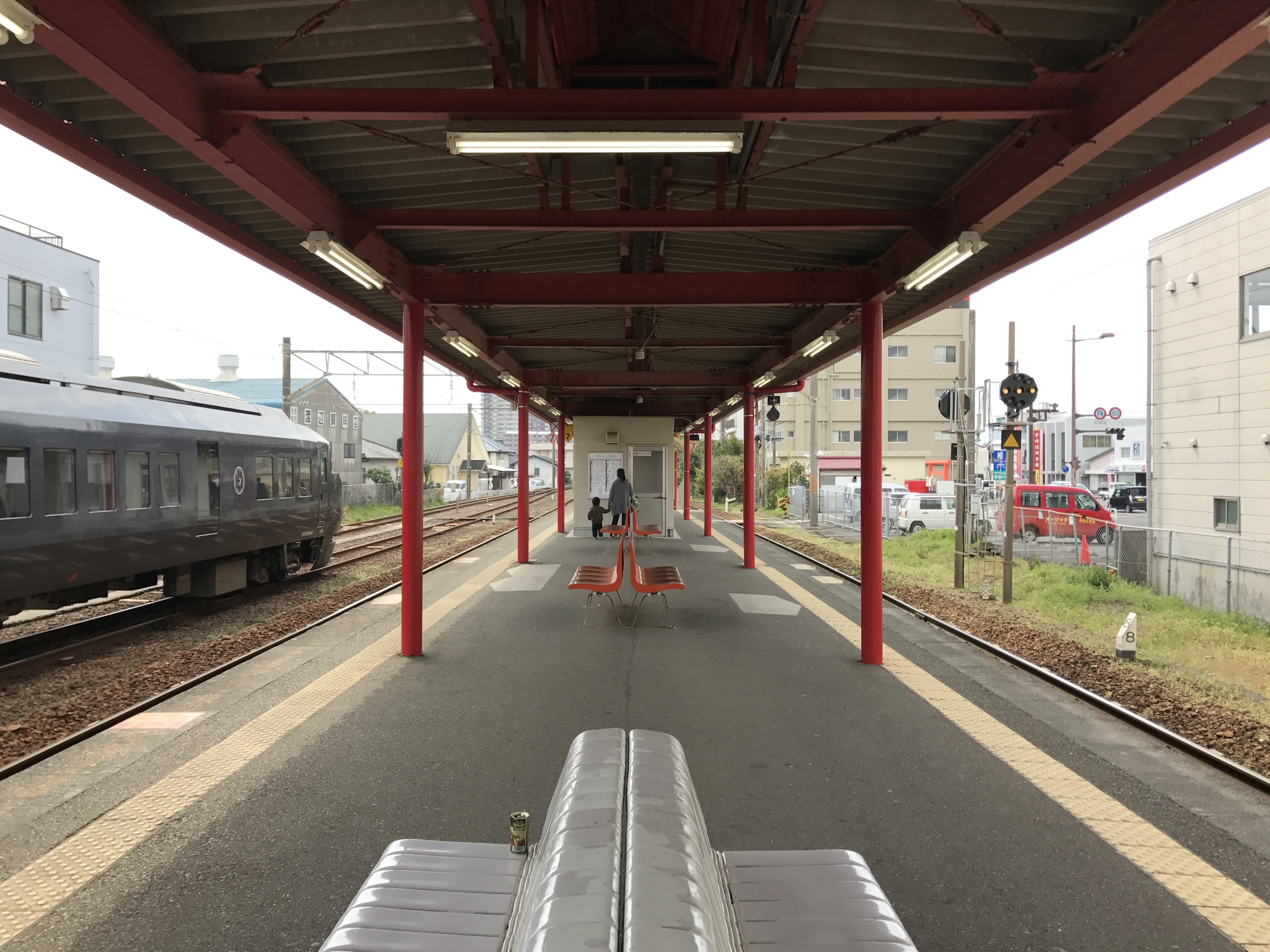
Another view of the platform. Beyond the waiting room, the level crossing can be seen in the distance.

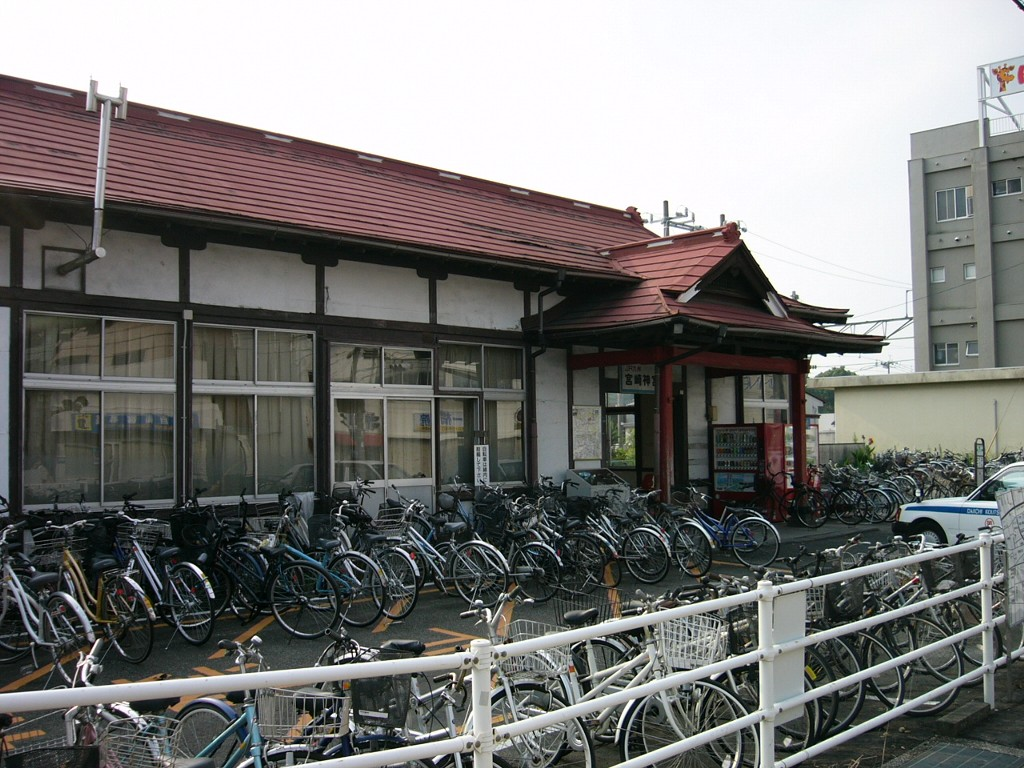
The old station building, since demolished. This photo was taken in 2003.

== History ==
On 15 December 1913, the Miyazaki Prefectural Railway (宮崎県営鉄道) opened a line from Miyazaki northwards to Hirose (now closed). This station, then named Hanagajima Station (花ヶ島駅) was opened on the same day as an intermediate station on the track. The Miyazaki Prefectural Railway was nationalized on 21 September 1917 and Japanese Government Railways (JGR) assumed control of the station, designating it as part of the Tsuma Light Rail Line (妻軽便線). By 1920, JGR had extended the track from Hirose northwards to Takanabe. Thus on 11 September 1920, JGR designated the stretch of track from Takanabe, through Hanagajima to Miyazaki as part of the Miyazaki Main Line, which at that time already comprised the track from Miyazaki southwards to Miyakonojō. Expanding north of Takanabe in phases, the track eventually reached Kokura and the entire stretch from Kokura to Miyakonojō was redesignated as the Nippō Main Line on 15 December 1923. Hanagajima was renamed Miyazaki-Jingu on 10 November 1954. Freight operations were discontinued in 1984 and baggage handling in 1985, after which the station became unattended. With the privatization of Japanese National Railways (JNR), the successor of JGR, on 1 April 1987, the station came under the control of JR Kyushu.

== Passenger statistics ==
In fiscal 2016, the station was used by an average of 542 passengers daily (boarding passengers only), and it ranked 235th among the busiest stations of JR Kyushu.

== Surrounding area ==
- Miyazaki-jingū
- Miyazaki City Omiya Elementary School
- Miyazaki City Higashiomiya Elementary School
- Miyazaki City Miyazaki Higashi Junior High School

== See also ==
- List of railway stations in Japan
