= Miyazaki Jingū =

Shinto shrine in Miyazaki, Japan

Miyazaki-jingū 宮崎神宮
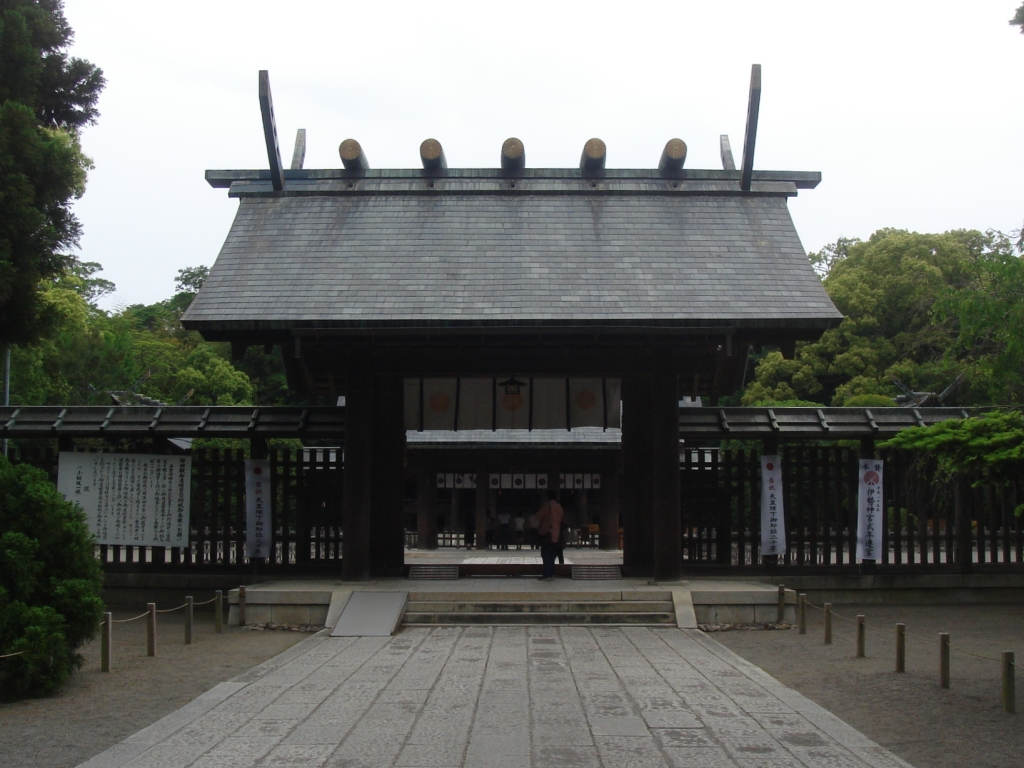

- Location within Japan

Religion
- Affiliation: Shinto
- Deity: Emperor Jimmu; Ugayafukiaezu; Tamayori-bime

Location
- Location: 2-4-1, Jingū, Miyazaki; Miyazaki 880-0053
- Interactive map of Miyazaki-jingū 宮崎神宮
- Coordinates: 31°56′19″N 131°25′24″E

Website
- miyazakijingu.jp

Miyazaki-jingū (宮崎神宮) is a Shinto shrine located in Miyazaki, Miyazaki prefecture, Japan. It is dedicated to Emperor Jimmu, Ugayafukiaezu and Tamayori-bime.

== Events ==
Many events are held at the shrine including the annual Yabusame festival on April 3.

The most important is the Aki-no-Taisai held in October. It is a costume parade in honour of Emperor Jimmu (Japan's first emperor) featuring women dressed in gorgeous wedding kimono.
