= Ōyamato Shrine =

Shinto shrine in Nara Prefecture, Japan

Ōyamato Shrine 大和神社
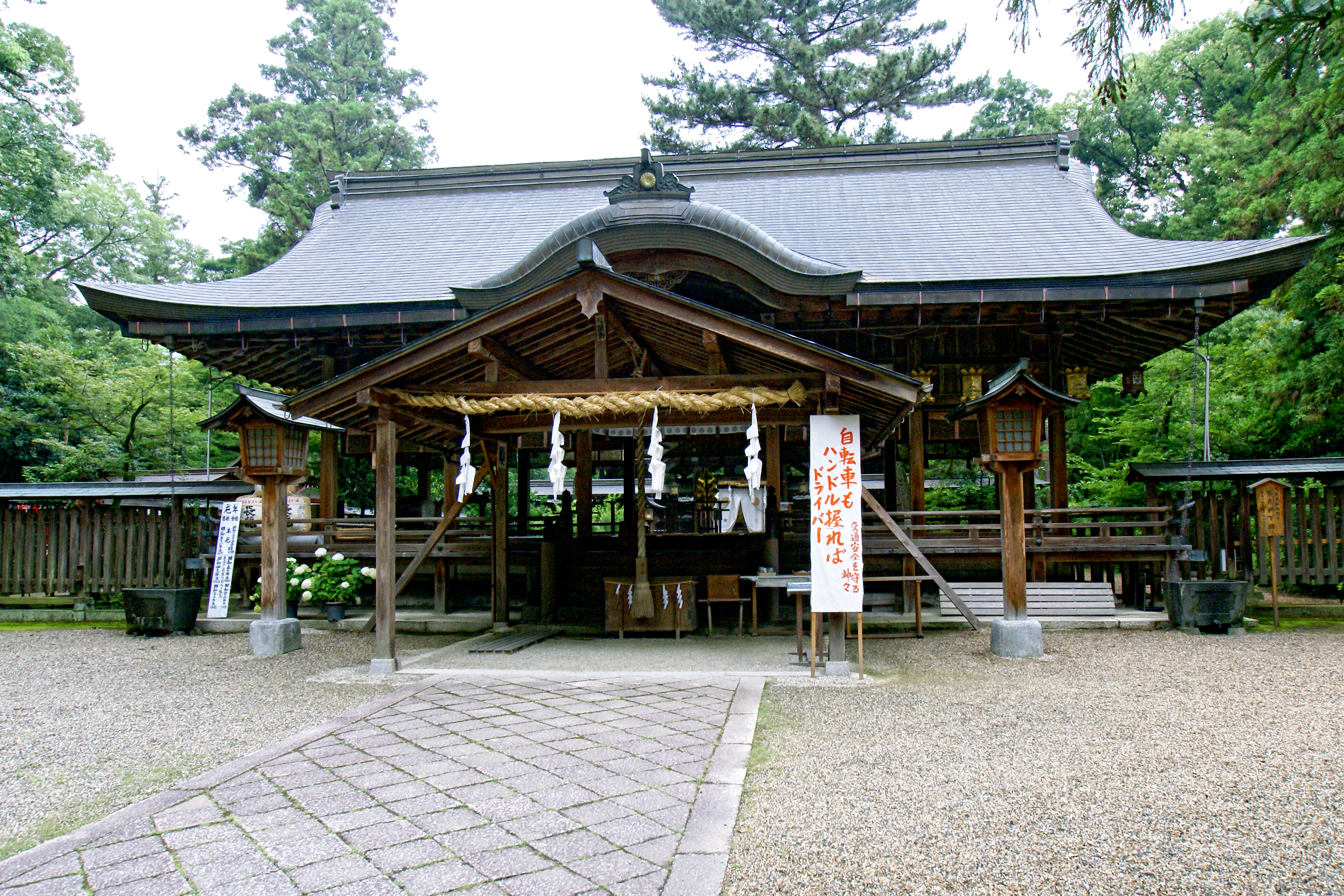
- The Haiden, or main prayer hall.

- Location within Japan

Religion
- Affiliation: Shinto
- Deity: Yamato Okunitama, Ōkuninushi, Toshigami

Location
- Location: 306 Hoshiyama, Shinsencho, Tenri, Nara
- Coordinates: 34°34′15″N 135°50′15″E

Architecture
- Style: Kasuga-zukuri

Website
- www5.plala.or.jp/ooyamato/

Ōyamato Shrine (大和神社, Ōyamato Jinja) is a Shinto shrine located in Tenri, Nara in Japan.

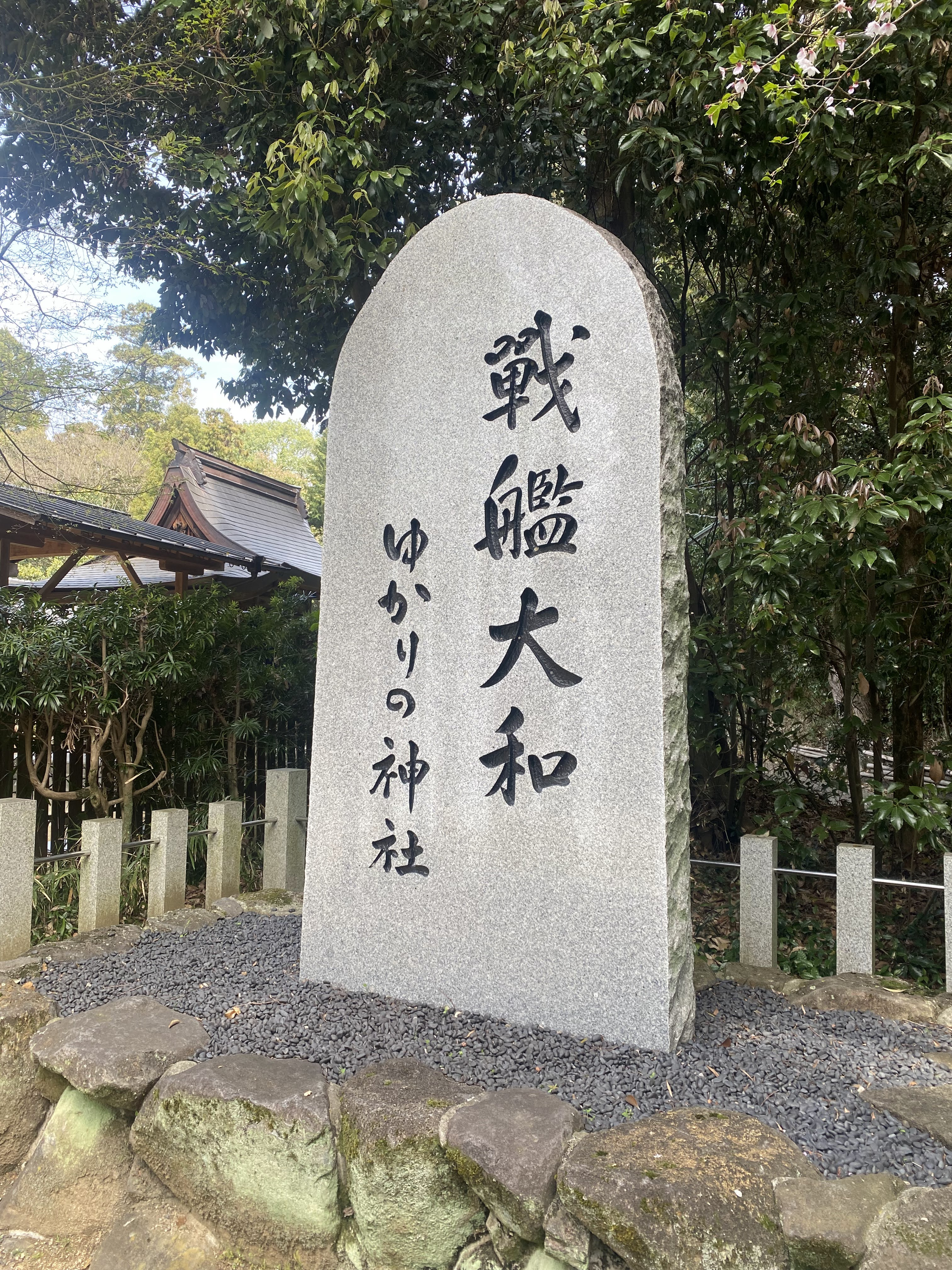
Monument of Japanese battleship Yamato in Ōyamato Shrine

In the time of Emperor Sujin there was a crisis. Amaterasu (via the Yata-no-Kagami and the Kusanagi sword) and Yamato Okunitama, the tutelary deity of Yamato, were originally worshipped in the great hall of the imperial palace. When a series of plagues broke out during Emperor Sujin's reign, he "dreaded [...] the power of these Gods, and did not feel secure in their dwelling together." He thus entrusted the mirror and the sword to his daughter Toyosukiirihime, who brought them to the village of Kasanuhi, and delegated the worship of Yamato Okunitama to another daughter, Nunaki-iri-hime, but her health began to fail shortly afterward. It is recorded that Nunakiiri-hime became emaciated after losing all of her hair, which rendered her unable to perform her duties. Ichishi no Nagaochi would conduct the Okunitama rites replacing the emaciated Nunaki-iri-hime. Ichishi no Nagaochi would be the ancestor of the Yamato clan. This replacement is taken as a shift towards more patriarchal religion. When the pestilence showed no sign of abating, he then performed divination, which revealed the plague to have been caused by Ōmononushi, the god of Mount Miwa. When the god was offered proper worship as per his demands, the epidemic ceased.

After this Ōyamato Shrine was founded for Yamato Okunitama and the descendants of the Yamato clan serve the shrine to this day.

The shrine became the object of Imperial patronage during the early Heian period. In 965, Emperor Murakami ordered that Imperial messengers were sent to report important events to the guardian kami of Japan. These heihaku were initially presented to 16 shrines including the Ōyamato Shrine.

From 1871 through 1946, the Ōyamato Shrine was officially designated one of the Kanpei-taisha (官幣大社), meaning that it stood in the first rank of government supported shrines.

The shrine was a guardian shrine of Japanese battleship Yamato.

== See also ==
- List of Shinto shrines
- Twenty-Two Shrines
- Modern system of ranked Shinto Shrines
