= Hasugaike Station =

Railway station in Miyazaki, Miyazaki Prefecture, Japan

Hasugaike Station 蓮ヶ池駅
- Hasugaike Station in 2024

General information
- Location: Kitada Murasumicho, Miyazaki-shi, Miyazaki-ken, 880-0837; Japan
- Coordinates: 31°57′37″N 131°26′34″E
- Operator: JR Kyushu
- Line: ■ Nippō Main Line
- Distance: 334.7 km from Kokura
- Platforms: 1 side platform
- Tracks: 1

Construction
- Structure type: At grade
- Accessible: No - steps to platform

Other information
- Status: Unstaffed
- Website: Official website

History
- Opened: 1 December 1986

Passengers
- FY2016: 196 daily

Services
Preceding station	JR Kyushu	Following station
Miyazaki-Jingū towards Kagoshima	Nippō Main Line	Hyūga-Sumiyoshi towards Kokura
Location
- Location within Miyazaki Prefecture Location within Japan

Hasugaike Station (蓮ヶ池駅, Hasugaike-eki) is a passenger railway station located in Miyazaki City, Miyazaki Prefecture, Japan. It is operated by JR Kyushu and is on the Nippō Main Line.

== Lines ==
The station is served by the Nippō Main Line and is located 334.7 km from the starting point of the line at Kokura. Only local trains stop at this station.

== Layout ==
The station, which is unstaffed, consists of a side platform serving a single track at grade. There is no station building. From the access road, a short flight of steps leads directly to the platform where there is a shelter housing Sugoca card readers.

== History ==
Japanese National Railways opened Hasugaike as an additional temporary stop on the existing track of the Nippō Main Line on 1 December 1986. With the privatization of JNR on 1 April 1987, the station came under the control of JR Kyushu which upgraded Hasugaike to a full station.

== Passenger statistics ==
In fiscal 2016, the station was used by an average of 196 passengers (boarding only) per day.

== Surrounding area ==
- Miyazaki City Sumiyoshi Minami Elementary School
- Miyazaki City Higashiomiya Junior High School
- Miyazaki Prefectural Miyazaki Kita High School
- Hasugaike Kofun Cluster

== See also ==
- List of railway stations in Japan
