= Origins of the Yamato Kingship =

According to legend, Japan was founded by Emperor Jimmu in 660 BCE. Modern scholars generally regard this as a myth.

Between 14,000 and 300 BC the Japanese archipelago was inhabited by the Jomon people. Then the Yayoi people migrated to the archipelago in masses from mainland Asia. Later numerous states appeared in the Japanese archipelago, one of these states named Yamatai formed after a civil war in the second century and was ruled by Himiko.

Eventually the Yamato Kingdom formed either in the third or fourth centuries, frequently described as the first Japanese state. There are various theories on origins of the Yamato state with many scholars proposing a link between Yamato and Yamatai. The Yamato clan also existed around the first century, possibly founding the Yamato state with most scholars believing that an imperial dynasty formed in the third century.

Later between the fourth and eight centuries the Yamato state would grow in power and incorporated other polities into its territory.

== Background ==
=== Mythical founding ===
According to legend, Emperor Jimmu (descendant of Amaterasu) founded a kingdom in central Japan in 660 BC, beginning a continuous imperial line.

Today most modern scholars agree that the traditional founding of the imperial dynasty in 660 BCE is a myth and that Jimmu is legendary. During the 7th century BCE, the Japanese people lived in scattered tribal communities and a unified political organization only emerged in the western parts of Japan centuries later. According to Dr. Lu, the year 660 BCE was probably selected by the writers of Nihon Shoki to put the founding of Japan on a kanoto-tori year.

=== Jomon period ===
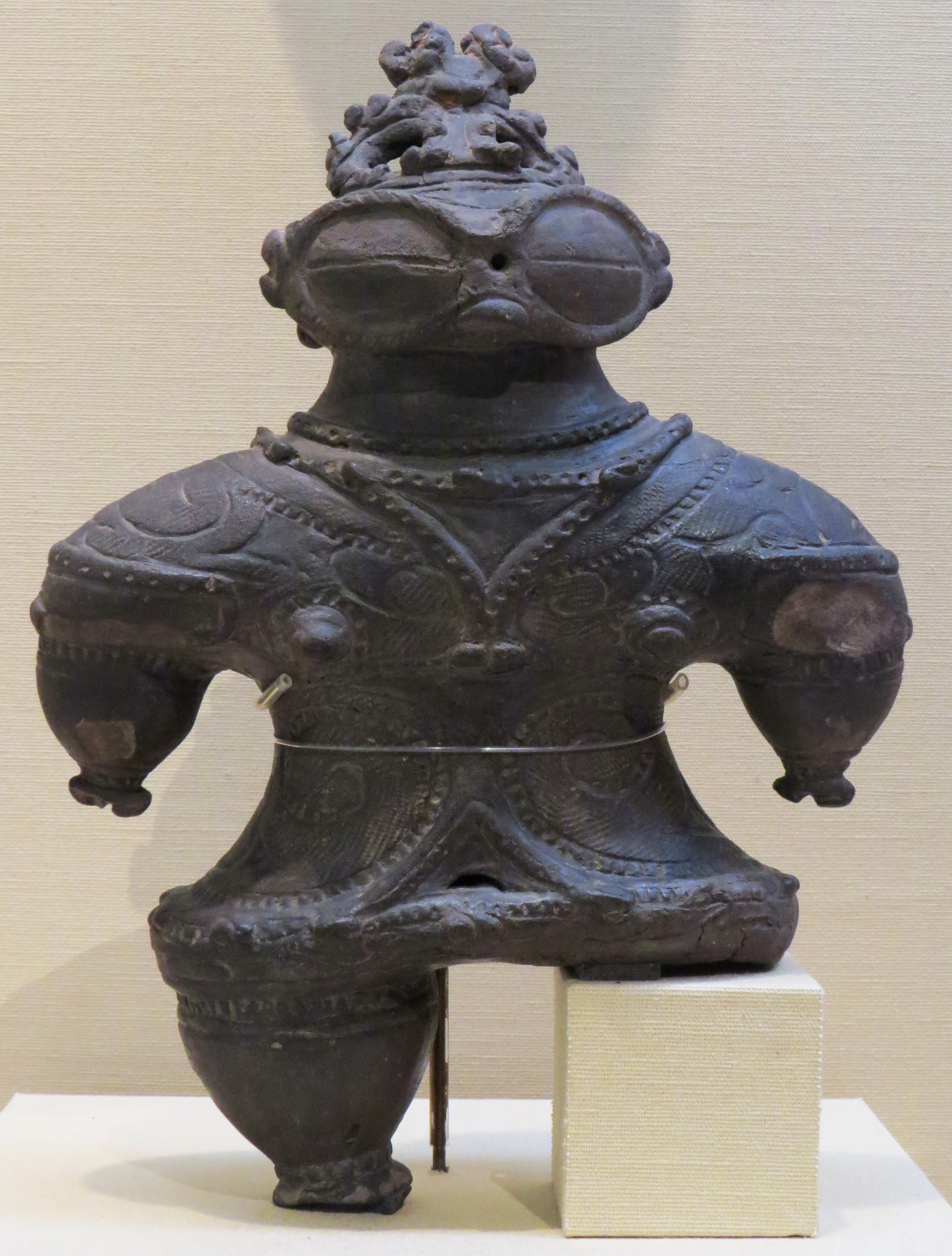
Final Jōmon dogū (土偶, "earthenware figure") figurine, 1000–400 BC

In Japanese history, the Jōmon period (Japanese: 縄文 時代, Hepburn: Jōmon jidai) is the time between c. 14,000 and 300 BC, during which Japan was inhabited by the Jōmon people, a diverse hunter-gatherer and early agriculturalist population united by a common culture, which reached a considerable degree of sedentism and cultural complexity. Their ancestors migrated from Northeast Asia, the Korean Peninsula, China, and Southeast Asia. Their civilization is divided into six distinct phases. They eventually admixed with the Japonic-speaking Yayoi people.

The Jōmon period was rich in tools and jewelry made from bone, stone, shell and antler; pottery figurines and vessels; and lacquerware. Jōmon pottery is noted for being decorated by having cords pressed into the wet outside of the pottery. Similar cultures developed in pre-Columbian cultures of the North American Pacific Northwest and especially the Valdivia culture in Ecuador because in these settings cultural complexity developed within a primarily hunting-gathering context with limited use of horticulture.

=== Yayoi period ===
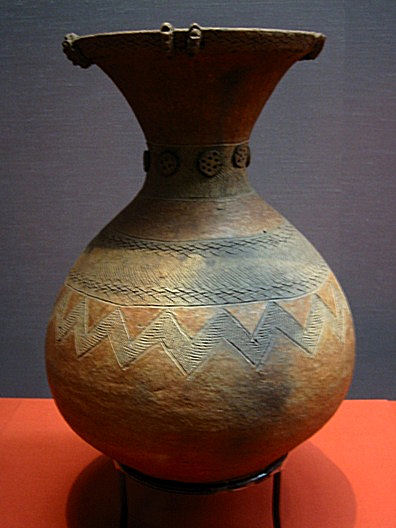
Yayoi jar, 1st–3rd century, excavated in Kugahara, Ōta, Tokyo

The Yayoi period (Japanese: 弥生時代, Hepburn: Yayoi jidai; c. 300 BC – AD 300) is one of the major historical periods of the Japanese archipelago. It is generally defined as the era between the beginning of food production in Japan and the emergence of keyhole-shaped burial mounds (前方後円墳, zenpō-kōen-fun). Chronologically, it spans from around the 10th century BC or 9th–8th century BC to the mid-3rd century AD.

Following the Jōmon period, which was characterized by a hunter-gatherer economy, the Yayoi period marked the transition to a productive economy based on wet-rice agriculture. In the latter half of the late Yayoi period (around the 1st century AD), large regional powers emerged throughout western Japan, including the Tokai and Hokuriku regions. By the end of the 2nd century, the political entity known as Wa-koku (倭国) had formed. It is generally considered that the Yayoi period transitioned into the Kofun period around the mid-3rd century, although the precise starting point of the Kofun period remains debated among scholars.

The name "Yayoi" was given in the 19th century by archaeologists, after artifacts and remains characteristic of this period were discovered in the Yayoi district of Tokyo. The most distinctive features of the Yayoi period are the emergence of a new style of pottery and the beginning of intensive rice cultivation in paddy fields. Yayoi pottery is more utilitarian and simpler in design compared to the decorative and intricate Jōmon pottery. With the advent of rice farming, people began to settle in one place for extended periods. Metallurgical techniques based on bronze and iron were introduced, and the inhabitants began to weave hemp, and to live in raised-floor dwellings with thatched roofs.

From an archaeological perspective, the term "Yayoi people" refers collectively to agricultural migrants from the Korean Peninsula and regions to the south, such as the South Pacific, who arrived during the Yayoi period. It does not denote a single ethnic group. These migrants gradually assimilated with the indigenous Jōmon population, forming the foundation of the modern Japanese people.

The degree of Yayoi cultural influence varied by region: Kyushu, Okinawa, and the Tōhoku region retained stronger Jōmon traits, while Kansai and Shikoku exhibited more pronounced Yayoi characteristics.

== Formation of states in Japanese archipelago ==
Chinese accounts dating from the first century and archeology give information about political life in ancient Japan. Chinese records as early as the year 57 AD identify the emergence of chieftains and polities in the archipelago.

Between the 1st and 3rd centuries AD there existed a kingdom called Na situated in the Fukuoka area. Na probably reached its highest point during the first century then eventually declined, the causes of this decline are unclear.

Mid-third century Chinese accounts suggest that Japan was not a single political entity and these accounts state that the archipelago contained over a hundred small communities, later ministates. The Chinese accounts in this period do suggest the region of Kibi (today Okayama prefecture) was an incipient state. By the end of the Yayoi period, chiefs in eastern Izumo formed a confederation.

=== Yamatai ===
According to Chinese records, during the second century Japan was in civil strafe then eventually unified by Himiko and she resided in Yamatai. Dr Gina Barnes states that: “Himiko is clearly a major figure in the story of Japanese state formation, but enigmatically, she is not directly attested in the Japanese chronicles.”

The location of Yamatai has been debated for centuries and is still debated. The surrounding controversy on Yamatai’s location is primarily about the origins and formation of the early Japanese state, and connection between Yamato and Yamatai.

=== Origins of Yamato ===
Yamato has been frequently described as the first Japanese state. According to Dr Barnes, there is a trend among scholars to view Yamatai and Yamato as the same entity.

It is unclear when exactly Yamato was first established, but it definitely existed during the 4th century AD. Yamato probably appeared during the Kofun period in the Kinai region, while some believe that it appeared in the southern part of Kyūshū.

Six tumuli have been found in the Shiki area at the base of Mount Miwa. These earthen mounds were built between 250 AD to 350 AD, and all display the same keyhole shape and stone chambers found in earlier mounds. The tumuli found at Mount Miwa hint at the beginning of a more centralized Yamato state. All six mounds are exceptionally large, twice as large as any similar mounds found in Korea, and contain prolific amounts of mirrors, weapons, ornaments, as well as finely built wood and bamboo coffins.

==== Origins of Japanese imperial family and possible founders of Yamato ====
The imperial system probably appeared during the Kofun. Most scholars agree that the third century AD is a more likely starting point for an imperial line in Japan.

According to Scott Morton, the ancestors to the imperial Yamato clan was a warlike clan that started in Kyushu then left the island around the first century AD. Morton states they probably left in order to find better land for agriculture and made their way gradually along the coast of the Inland Sea. Then the imperial clan may have been established as rulers in the Yamato region by third or fourth centuries. There is a good possibility the imperial family has Korean ancestry.

Most scholars are also of the view that Emperor Sujin is the first verifiable emperor. The Nihon shoki lists Sujin as the 10th emperor and places his death around 30 AD, while Kojiki places it around 258 AD; although 318 AD is more likely. Sujin may have also been the founder of the imperial dynasty and possibly a son to Queen Toyo. Some believe that Sujin was the head of a group of a group of early 4th century Korean horse riders, and that these horse riders founded the Yamato state. However, Suijn was most likely a member of the Yamato clan.

Some historians believe Ōjin was the founder of the Yamato state.

==== Date of formation of Yamato ====
John Whitney Hall stated in 1971 about the founding of the Japanese state that: “Historians today agree the achievement of political unity in Japan more likely occurred at the end of the third century or the beginning of the fourth century A.D., at a point marked by the appearance of the Kofun tumuli.” According to Jansen, the Yamato state appeared between 250 AD to 300 AD. Some scholars think Ojin founded the Yamato state during the year 390.

According to Dr Barnes, when the state actually arose in the area is a matter of definition and that states “cannot be false, only more or less useful”.

== Yamato grows in power ==
=== Early Kofun period ===
According to Dr Barnes, Yamato during the early Kofun period was confined to the southern parts of the Nara Basin. Dr Barnes also hypothesized the existence of another polity located in the northwestern region of the basin during this time.

There is a debate on the power of Yamato during the early Kofun period, with one side viewing it as a confederation of polities and the other viewing it as a strict hierarchical state based on keyhole shaped tombs. Nonetheless the Yamato clan most likely grew in power and authority overtime.

=== 4th to 5th centuries ===
Around the year 350 Yamato power moved up north in the Nara basin near the present city of Nara. According to Japanese historian Wakai Toshiaki (若井敏明), the Yamato Kingship collapsed Yamatai in 367, killing its last ruler, Queen Taburatsuhime (田油津媛).

As of the late twentieth century Japanese archaeologists view Yamato’s authority during the 4th century as only being confined to the Kinai region and the western parts of the archipelago were ruled by leaders who were in conflict with Yamato.Brittannica states by the end of the century Yamato gained considerable amount of control over the archipelago and was a well settled kingdom in the Nara plain.

Yamato authority during the fourth and fifth centuries was probably not absolute but rather a coalition of clans, although a fifth century poem attributed to Yuryaku suggests a sense of statehood at the time. According to Scott Morton, by the fifth century or earlier the Yamato were well centralized and possessed some control over the archipelago from the Kanto plain to Kyushu. According to Dr Hall, by the fifth century Yamato’s power probably reached its peak beginning with emperor Nintoku and ending with Yuryaku.

Yamato administered land by either appointing officials or allowed conquered chieftains to continue rule as governors.

=== 6th century and later ===
After the Iwai rebellion in 528, Northern Kyushu was incorporated into the Yamato state. It became an important outpost.

During the 6th or 7th century the Izumo region was fully absorbed into the Yamato state. The Kibi region on the other hand appears to have been incorporated into the Yamato state at earlier stage, but still kept a regional identity with various uprisings in the area during the fifth century.

By the mid-7th century the Hayato people located in southern Kyūshū would also pay tribute to Yamato. Then by the 8th century they were under Yamato rule.
