= Sadowara Station =

Railway station in Miyazaki, Miyazaki Prefecture, Japan

Sadowara Station 佐土原駅
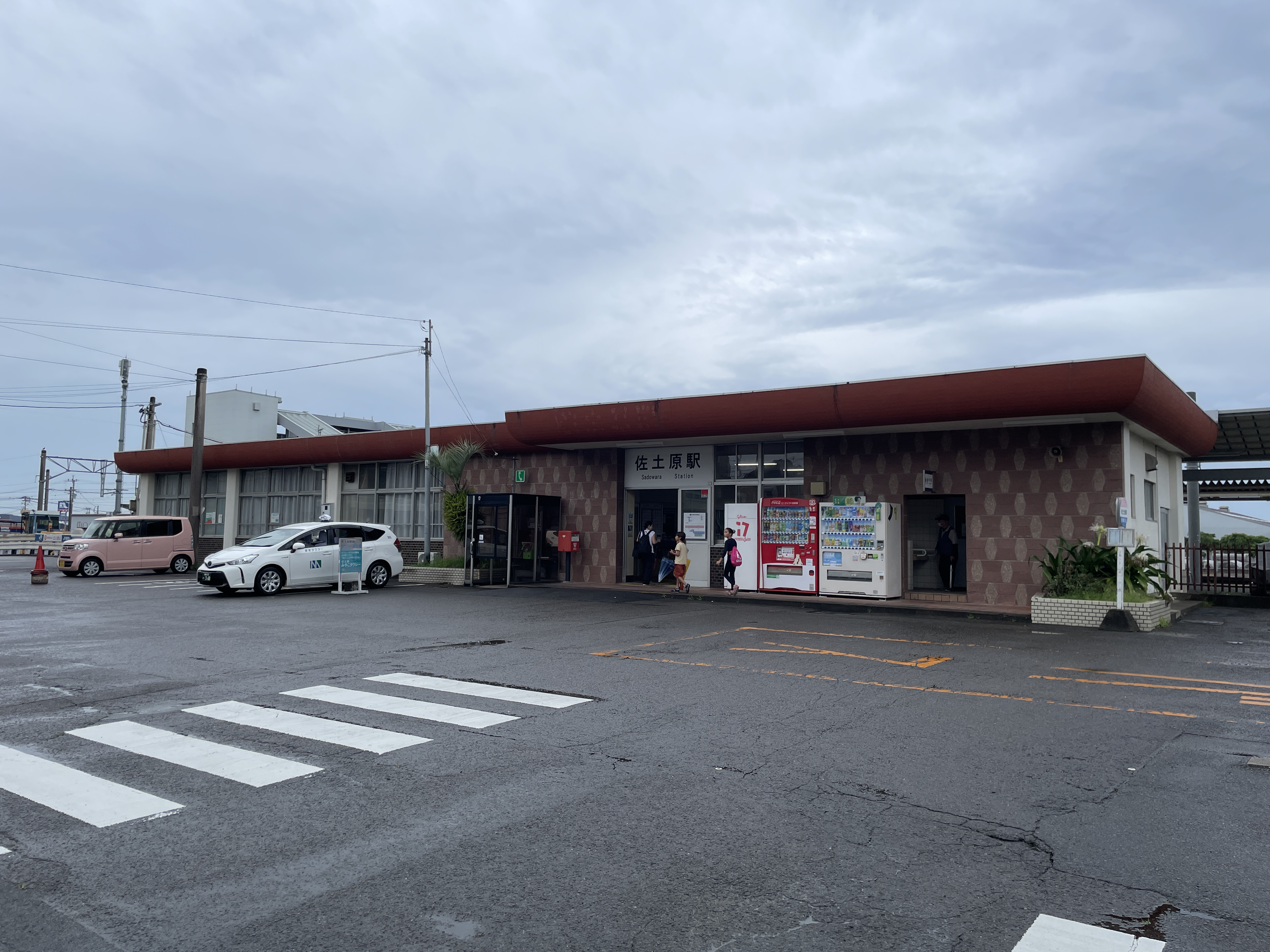
- Sadowara Station in 2023

General information
- Location: Shimotajima Sadowaracho, Miyazaki-shi, Miyazaki-ken, 880-0211; Japan
- Coordinates: 32°01′21″N 131°28′38″E
- Operator: JR Kyushu JR Freight
- Line: ■ Nippō Main Line
- Distance: 326.7 km from Kokura
- Platforms: 1 side + 1 island platforms
- Tracks: 3 + 1 passing loop and 1 siding

Construction
- Structure type: At grade
- Accessible: No - island platformed accessed by footbridge

Other information
- Status: Staffed ticket window (outsourced)
- Website: Official website

History
- Opened: 11 September 1920
- Former names: Hirose (until 1 July 1965)

Passengers
- FY2016: 1,075 daily
- Rank: 155th (among JR Kyushu stations)

Services
Preceding station	JR Kyushu	Following station
Hyūga-Shintomi towards Kagoshima	Nippō Main Line	Hyūga-Sumiyoshi towards Kokura
Location
- Location within Miyazaki Prefecture Location within Japan

Sadowara Station (佐土原駅, Sadowara-eki) is a passenger railway station located in Miyazaki City, Miyazaki Prefecture, Japan. It is operated by JR Kyushu and is on the Nippō Main Line, and until 1984, was a junction for the now closed Tsuma Line. It is also a freight depot for JR Freight.

== Lines ==
The station is served by the Nippō Main Line and is located 326.7 km from the starting point of the line at Kokura.

== Layout ==
The station consists of a side platform and an island platform serving three tracks at grade. Track/platform 1, directly access from the station building, is a dead-end siding that only serves trains heading to/from the direction of Miyazaki to the south. The island platform with tracks 2 and 3 is accessed by a footbridge. A passing loop runs between tracks 1 and 2. The station building is a modern flat-roofed concrete structure which houses a waiting area, a staffed ticket window, an automatic ticket vending machine, and SUGOCA card reader and charge machine. Adjacent to the station building and beside track 1 is a container terminer, formerly served by rail but now part of the Sadowara ORS (off-rail station) which only uses trucks.

Management of the passenger facilities at the station has been outsourced to the JR Kyushu Tetsudou Eigyou Co., a wholly owned subsidiary of JR Kyushu specialising in station services. It staffs the ticket booth which is equipped with a POS machine but does not have a Midori no Madoguchi facility.

=== Platforms ===
1	■ ■ Nippō Main Line	for Miyakonojō and Kagoshima-Chūō
2	■ ■ Nippō Main Line	for Minami-Miyazaki and Miyazaki

== History ==
In 1913, the Miyazaki Prefectural Railway (宮崎県営鉄道) had opened a line from Miyazaki northwards to Hirose and by 1914, to Tsuma. After the Miyazaki Prefectural Railway was nationalized on 21 September 1917, Japanese Government Railways (JGR) undertook the subsequent extension of the track. In the first phase of expansion, the track was forked northwest and north. The track heading northwest to Tsuma was sectioned off and designated as the Tsuma Line (妻線). A new track was laid heading north from Hyūga-Sumiyoshi to Takanabe which opened on 11 September 1920. This new stretch and the rest of the track south to Miyazaki became part of the Miyazaki Main Line. On the same day, Hirose on the Tsuma Line track was closed and this station was opened at the junction of the Tsuma and Miyazaki Main Line. It took on the name Hirose Station (広瀬駅, Hirose-eki) but was renamed Sadowara on 1 July 1965. Expanding north from Takanabe in phases and joining up with other networks, the track eventually reached Kokura and the entire stretch from Kokura through Hirose to Miyakonojō was redesignated as the Nippō Main Line on 15 December 1923. Freight operations were discontinued in 1984 and on 1 December 1984, the Tsuma Line was closed, leaving the Nippō Main Line as the only line to serve Sadowara. With the privatization of Japanese National Railways (JNR), the successor of JGR, on 1 April 1987, the station came under the control of JR Kyushu. Freight operations were resumed on 31 July 1991 under JR Freight, but freight train services were discontinued again on 3 October 1998, and replaced by an off-rail service using trucks.

== Passenger statistics ==
In fiscal 2016, the station was used by an average of 1,075 passengers daily (boarding passengers only), and it ranked 155th among the busiest stations of JR Kyushu.

== Sadowara Off-Rail Station ==
The Sadowara Off-Rail Station (abbreviation: Sadowara ORS) is a fright container collection and delivery base that belongs to JR Freight and is located on the north side of the station building. It handles container cargo (12-foot containers only), and truck services, which replace freight trains, operate twice a day between here and Nobeoka Station.

== Surrounding area ==
- Miyazaki City Hall Sadowara General Branch (former Sadowara Town Hall)
- Miyazaki City Hirose Elementary School
- Miyazaki City Hirose Junior High School

== See also ==
- List of railway stations in Japan
