= Hasugaike Kofun Cluster =

- 蓮ヶ池古墳群 (Japanese)
- Hasugaike Kofun Cluster Hasugaike Kofun Cluster (Japan)
- Interactive map of Hasugaike Kofun Cluster
- 31°58′10.5″N 131°26′43.7″E
- Type: necropolis
- Periods: Kofun period
- Location: Miyazaki, Miyazaki, Japan
- Region: Kyushu

History
- Built: 6th-7th century CE

Site notes
- Owner: Public
- Public access: Yes

The Hasugaike Kofun Cluster (蓮ヶ池古墳群, Hasugaike kofungun) is a cluster of yokoanabo (横穴墓), tunnel tombs in artificial caves, in a tuff cliff of located in the Yoshiki neighborhood of the city of Miyazaki, Miyazaki Prefecture in Kyushu Japan. It was designated as a National Historic Site in 1971 because it is the southern limit of the distribution of horizontal corridor-type kofun in Japan.

== Background ==
The Hasugaike Kofun Cluster site is located on a hill on the west side of the Miyazaki Plain facing the Hyūga Sea, extending approximately one kilometer east-to-west and 1.3 kilometers north-to-south. The tombs open to the south. Currently, 82 kofun have been confirmed, and they are divided into the first group distributed in the hills on the west side of the designated area, the second group distributed in the central hills, the third group distributed in the eastern hills, and single horizontal holes. Since the cluster can be subdivided into four to six groups, it is highly likely that these side caves were family tombs. Except for Kofun No.12, which the unique in that it has a vestibule, each burial chamber is shaped like a slightly elongated rectangular house; the ceiling is a pointed dome shape, and there are drainage ditches around the circumferences of the chamber. Additionally, the walls of the burial chamber of Tomb No. 53 are decorated with line carvings of people, ships, demon faces, etc..

These tombs date to the late Kofun period, and are estimated to have been built between the 6th and 7th centuries. This was the period during the Kofun period when keyhole-shaped zenpokoenfun tumuli ceased to be constructed.

The large number of well-preserved corridor-type kofun clustered together is unprecedented in southern Kyushu. Currently, the surrounding area has been maintained as Hasugaike Historical Park. It is located approximately 20 minutes on foot from Hasugaike Station on the JR Kyushu Nippō Main Line.

== See also ==
- List of Historic Sites of Japan (Miyazaki)
