= Hyūga-Sumiyoshi Station =

Railway station in Miyazaki, Miyazaki Prefecture, Japan

Hyūga-Sumiyoshi Station 日向住吉駅
- Hyūga-Sumiyoshi Station in 2026

General information
- Location: Shimanouchi, Miyazaki-shi, Miyazaki-ken 880-0121; Japan
- Coordinates: 31°59′26″N 131°27′26″E
- Operator: JR Kyushu
- Line: ■ Nippō Main Line
- Distance: 330.9 km from Kokura
- Platforms: 1 island platform
- Tracks: 2 + 1 siding

Construction
- Structure type: At grade
- Cycle facilities: Designated parking area for bicycles
- Accessible: No - footbridge to platform

Other information
- Status: Staffed ticket window (outsourced)
- Website: Official website

History
- Opened: 15 December 1913
- Former names: Jirogabyū (until 1 October 1935)

Passengers
- FY2016: 858 daily
- Rank: 183rd (among JR Kyushu stations)

Services
Preceding station	JR Kyushu	Following station
Sadowara towards Kagoshima	Nippō Main Line	Hasugaike towards Kokura
Location
- Location within Miyazaki Prefecture Location within Japan

Hyūga-Sumiyoshi Station (日向住吉駅, Hyūga-Sumiyoshi-eki) is a passenger railway station located in Miyazaki City, Miyazaki Prefecture, Japan. It is operated by JR Kyushu and is on the Nippō Main Line.

== Lines ==
The station is served by the Nippō Main Line and is located 330.9 km from the starting point of the line at Kokura. Only local trains stop at this station.

== Layout ==
The station consists of an island platform serving two tracks at grade with a siding. The station building is a wooden structure in western style with a stained glass gable. It houses a staffed ticket window and a waiting area. Access to the island platform is by means of a footbridge.

Management of the passenger facilities at the station has been outsourced to the JR Kyushu Tetsudou Eigyou Co., a wholly owned subsidiary of JR Kyushu specialising in station services. It staffs the ticket booth which is equipped with a POS machine but does not have a Midori no Madoguchi facility.

=== Platforms ===
1	■ ■ Nippō Main Line	for Miyazaki
2	■ ■ Nippō Main Line	for Nobeoka

== History ==
On 15 December 1913, the Miyazaki Prefectural Railway (宮崎県営鉄道) opened a line from Miyazaki northwards to Hirose (now closed). This station, then named Jirogabyū Station (次郎ヶ別府駅) was opened on the same day as an intermediate station on the track. The Miyazaki Prefectural Railway was nationalized on 21 September 1917 and Japanese Government Railways (JGR) assumed control of the station, designating it as part of the Tsuma Light Rail Line (妻軽便線). By 1920, JGR had extended the track from Hirose northwards to Takanabe. Thus on 11 September 1920, JGR designated the stretch of track from Takanabe, through this station to Miyazaki as part of the Miyazaki Main Line, which at that time already comprised the track from Miyazaki southwards to Miyakonojō. Expanding north of Takanabe in phases, the track eventually reached Kokura and the entire stretch from Kokura to Miyakonojō was redesignated as the Nippō Main Line on 15 December 1923. Jirogabyū was renamed Hyūga-Sumiyoshi on 1 October 1935. Freight operations were discontinued in 1962 and baggage handling in 1984. With the privatization of Japanese National Railways (JNR), the successor of JGR, on 1 April 1987, the station came under the control of JR Kyushu.

== Passenger statistics ==
In fiscal 2022, the station was used by an average of 1002 passengers daily (boarding passengers only), and it ranked 151st among the busiest stations of JR Kyushu.

== Surrounding area ==
- Nissho Gakuen Junior and Senior High School
- Miyazaki Nihon University Academy

== See also ==
- List of railway stations in Japan
