= Itsuse no Mikoto =

Older brother of the first Emperor of Japan

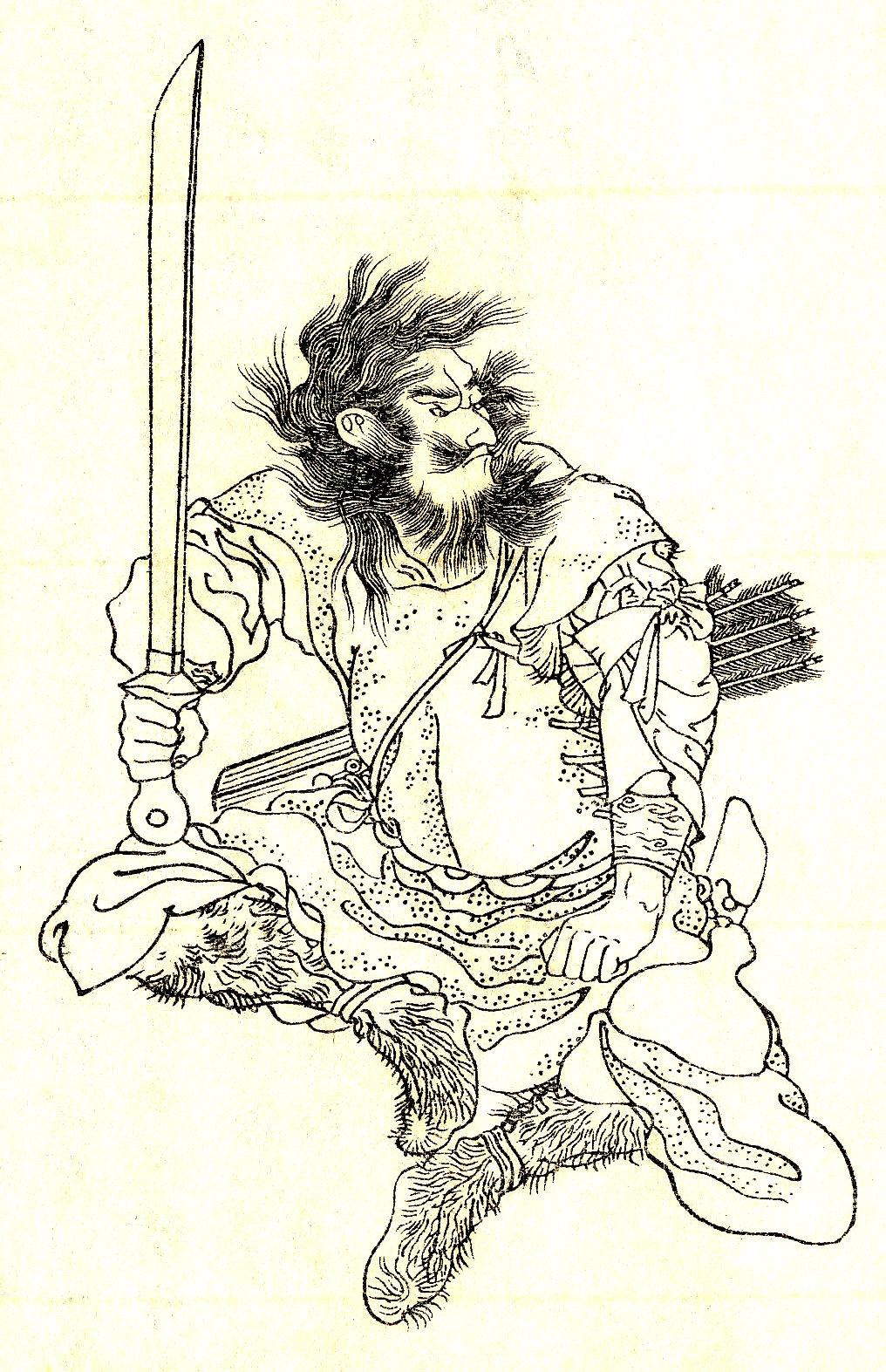

Genealogy
- Parents: Ugayafukiaezu (father); Tamayori-hime (mother)
- Siblings: Emperor Jimmu

Itsuse no Mikoto (Japanese: 彦五瀬命, Hepburn: Hiko Itsuse no Mikoto) is a figure in Japanese legend and a kami as the first son of Ugayafukiaezu and Tamayori-hime, making him the older brother of Emperor Jimmu. He joined Jimmu on his Eastern Expedition, where he died.
