= Izumo Federation =

Tribal confederation in Japan

The Izumo Federation was a tribal confederation in the Japanese archipelago that existed during the Yayoi and Kofun periods.

== History ==
By the end of the Yayoi period, chiefs in eastern Izumo formed a confederation. Historians agree that there was a big struggle between the Yamato federation and the Izumo Federation centuries before written records.

During the early Kofun period (3rd century), the Izumo region constructed rectangular tumuli. In the fourth century, this region saw the construction of rectangular and key-shaped tumuli.

By the sixth century, the rulers of the Izumo region sent tribute to Yamato. During the 6th or 7th century it was absorbed due to the expansion of the Yamato Kingship.

== Government and religion ==
Some historians refer these chiefs as “kings of Izumo”. The chiefs in both the Kofun and the Yayoi period were considered sacred and relied on religion for influence.
