= Takachiho Shrine =

Shinto shrine in Miyazaki Prefecture, Japan

Takachiho-jinja 高千穂神社
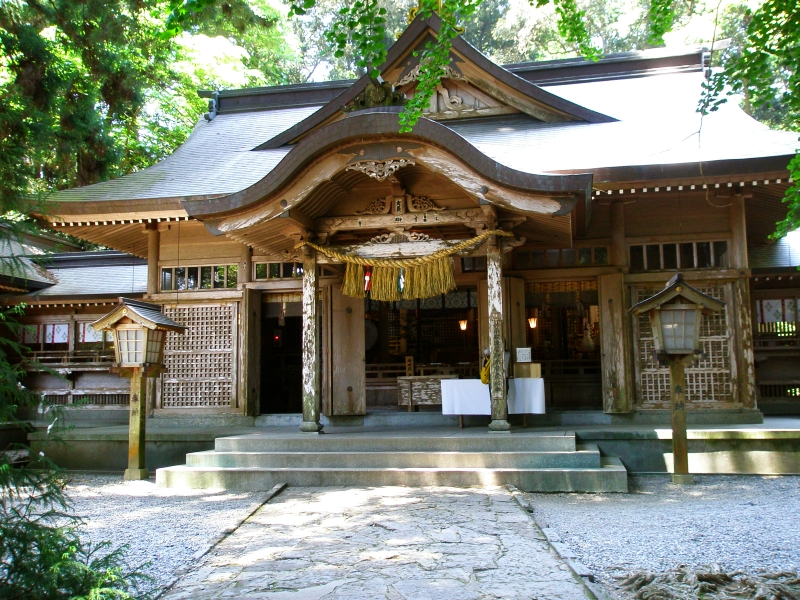

- Location within Japan

Religion
- Affiliation: Shinto
- Deity: Takachihosumegami; Jisha Daimyojin; Mikeiri no Mikoto

Location
- Location: 1037, Mitai, Takachiho; Nishiusuki District; Miyazaki 882-1101
- Interactive map of Takachiho-jinja 高千穂神社
- Coordinates: 32°42′24″N 131°18′06″E

Website
- www.town-takachiho.jp/kankou/taka-zi.htm

Takachiho-jinja (高千穂神社) is a Shinto shrine located in Takachiho, Miyazaki prefecture, Japan. It is dedicated to Takachihosumegami (高千穂皇神) and Jisha Daimyojin (十社大明神) and Mikeiri no Mikoto.

== Admission fees ==
The shrine is open to the public. However, an admission fee is payable.

- 500 yen per person over 20 years old.
- 400 yen per person under 20 years old.
