= Yamato no Kuni no Miyatsuko =

Japanese noble family

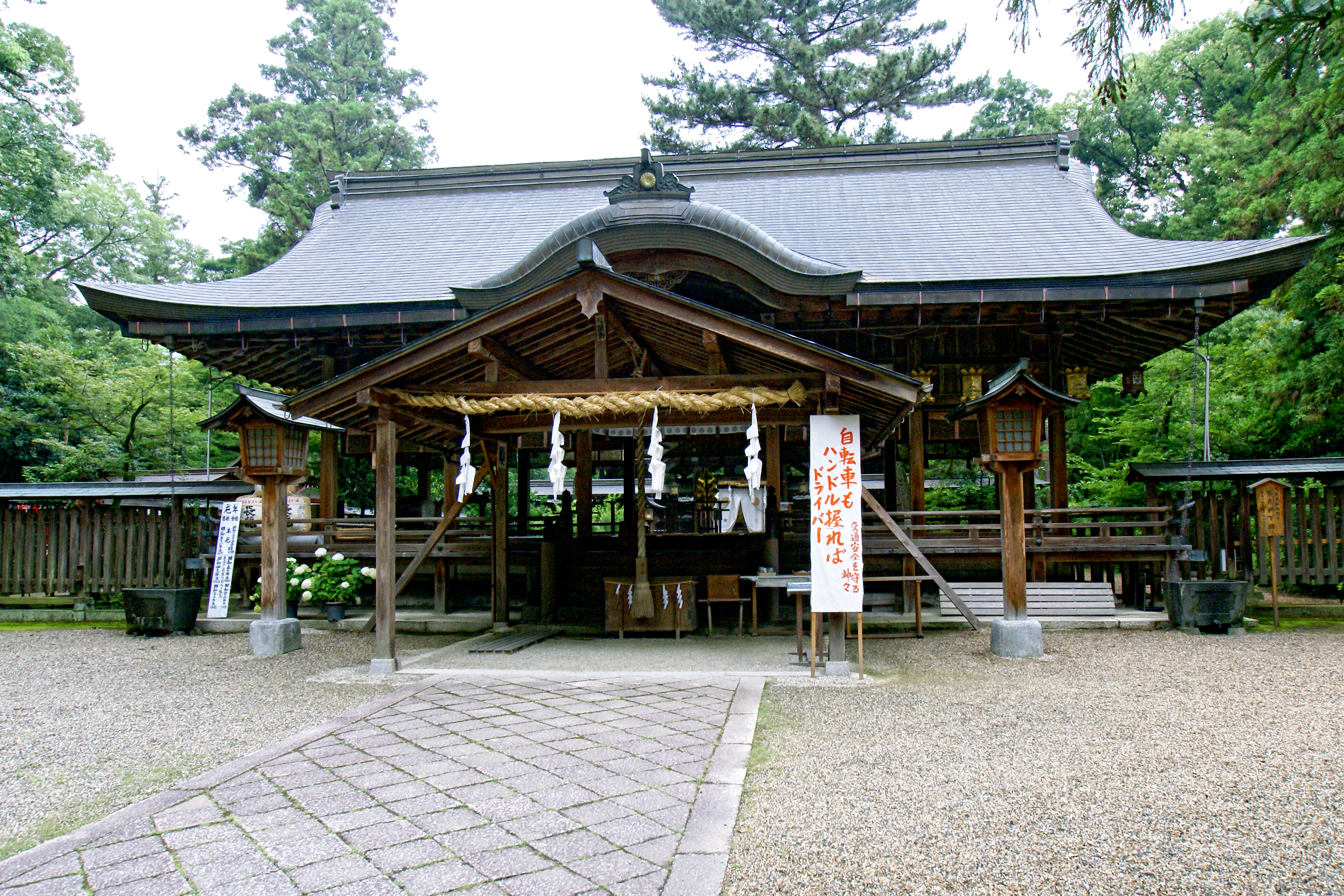
- Oyamato Shrine, their main shrine
- Home province: Yamato Province
- Founder: Shinetsuhiko, Ichishi no Nagaochi

Yamato no Kuni no Miyatsuko was a title held by the clan (Note: Yamato no Atai clan) who ruled the central region of the later Yamato Province. Kuni no Miyatsuko were regional rulers subordinate to the Emperor of Japan. After the position was abolished they remained prominent as the priests of Ōyamato Shrine. Other kuni no miyatsuko this happened to include the Izumo clan of Izumo-taisha, the Aso clan of Aso Shrine, the Owari clan of Atsuta Shrine, the Munakata clan of Munakata Taisha, and the Amabe clan of Kono Shrine

Their Ujigami or clan god is Yamato Okunitama of Ōyamato Shrine Some scholars interpret the kami as being a variant or epithet of Ōmononushi who has much more widespread worship. There is a complex myth about the origins of modern worship of Yamato Okunitama during the reign of Emperor Sujin.

== History ==
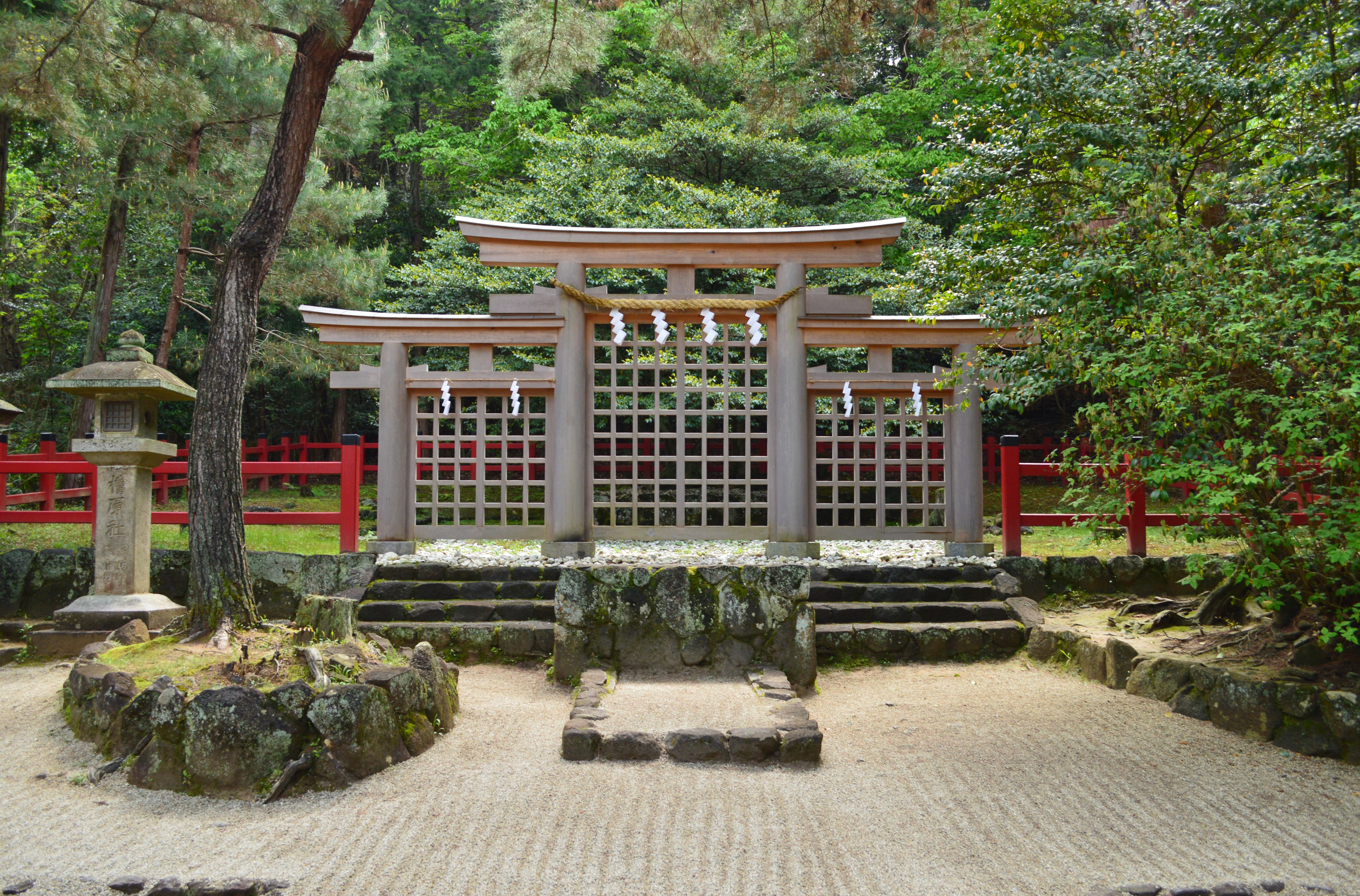
Hibara Shrine, at the foot of Mount Miwa in Sakurai, Nara, identified as the place where the Yata-no-Kagami and the Kusanagi-no-Tsurugi were first enshrined after their removal from the imperial palace.

During Jimmu's Eastern Expedition Saonetsuhiko was given the position of governor of Yamato Province by Emperor Jimmu. And Saonetsuhiko became their ancestor.

There is a complex myth about the reign of Emperor Sujin and its link to the worship of Yamato Okunitama and Amaterasu. There was a crisis during his reign and eventually the worship of Amaterasu and Yamato Okunitama were moved out of the imperial palace to separate shrines.

Worship of Amaterasu moved to Hibara Shrine and then many other shrines called Moto-Ise Shrines until eventually reaching Ise Jingu.

By contrast the worship of Yamato Okunitama moved to Oyamato Shrine, near Hibara Shrine and Omiwa Shrine. Yamato Okunitama was first entrusted to a daughter of Emperor Sujin named Nunaki-iri-hime, but shortly afterwards, her health began to fail. It is recorded that she became emaciated and lost all of her hair, which rendered her unable to perform her duties. These efforts still did not alleviate the ongoing plague, so Sujin decreed that a divination be performed sometime during the 7th year of his reign, that would involve him making a trip to the plain of Kami-asaji, and invoking the eighty myriad deities.

After the divination, Ichishi no Nagaochi, a descendant of Shinetsuhiko would conduct the rites pertaining to Okunitama, replacing the emaciated Nunaki-iri-hime. Ichishi no Nagaochi would be the ancestor of the Yamato no Kuni no Miyatsuko.

Agoko no Sukune was a notable member of the clan and governor of Yamato Province

== See also ==
- Kuni no miyatsuko
- Princess Yamato Totohi Momoso
- Yamato Okunitama Shrine

== Notes ==
=== Bibliography ===
==== Nihon Shoki ====
See the references under Nihon Shoki for an extended bibliography

- Aston, William George (1896). Nihongi: Chronicles of Japan from the Earliest Times to A.D. 697. Vol. 1. London: Kegan Paul, Trench, Trubner (for the Japan Society of London). ISBN 9780524053478. OCLC 448337491., alt-link English translation
- JHTI (2002). "Nihon Shoki". Japanese Historical Text Initiative (JHTI). UC Berkeley., searchtext resource to retrieve kanbun text vs. English tr. (Aston) in blocs.
- Ujiya, Tsutomu (宇治谷孟) (1988). Nihon shoki (日本書紀). Vol. 上. Kodansha. ISBN 978-0-8021-5058-5., modern Japanese translation.
- Chamberlain, Basil Hall (1919). The Kojiki. Kadokawa. OCLC 1882339. sacred texts
- Takeda, Yukichi (武田祐吉) (1977). Shintei Kojiki (新訂 古事記). Kadokawa. ISBN 4-04-400101-4., annotated Japanese.

==== Secondary sources ====
- Brown, Delmer M. and Ichirō Ishida, eds. (1979). Gukanshō: The Future and the Past. Berkeley: University of California Press. ISBN 978-0-520-03460-0; OCLC 251325323
- Nussbaum, Louis-Frédéric and Käthe Roth. (2005). Japan encyclopedia. Cambridge: Harvard University Press. ISBN 978-0-674-01753-5; OCLC 58053128
- Ponsonby-Fane, Richard Arthur Brabazon. (1959). The Imperial House of Japan. Kyoto: Ponsonby Memorial Society. OCLC 194887
- Titsingh, Isaac. (1834). Nihon Ōdai Ichiran; ou, Annales des empereurs du Japon. Paris: Royal Asiatic Society, Oriental Translation Fund of Great Britain and Ireland. OCLC 5850691
- Varley, H. Paul. (1980). Jinnō Shōtōki: A Chronicle of Gods and Sovereigns. New York: Columbia University Press. ISBN 978-0-231-04940-5; OCLC 59145842
