= Jimmu's Eastern Expedition =

Series of legends about Japan's first emperor

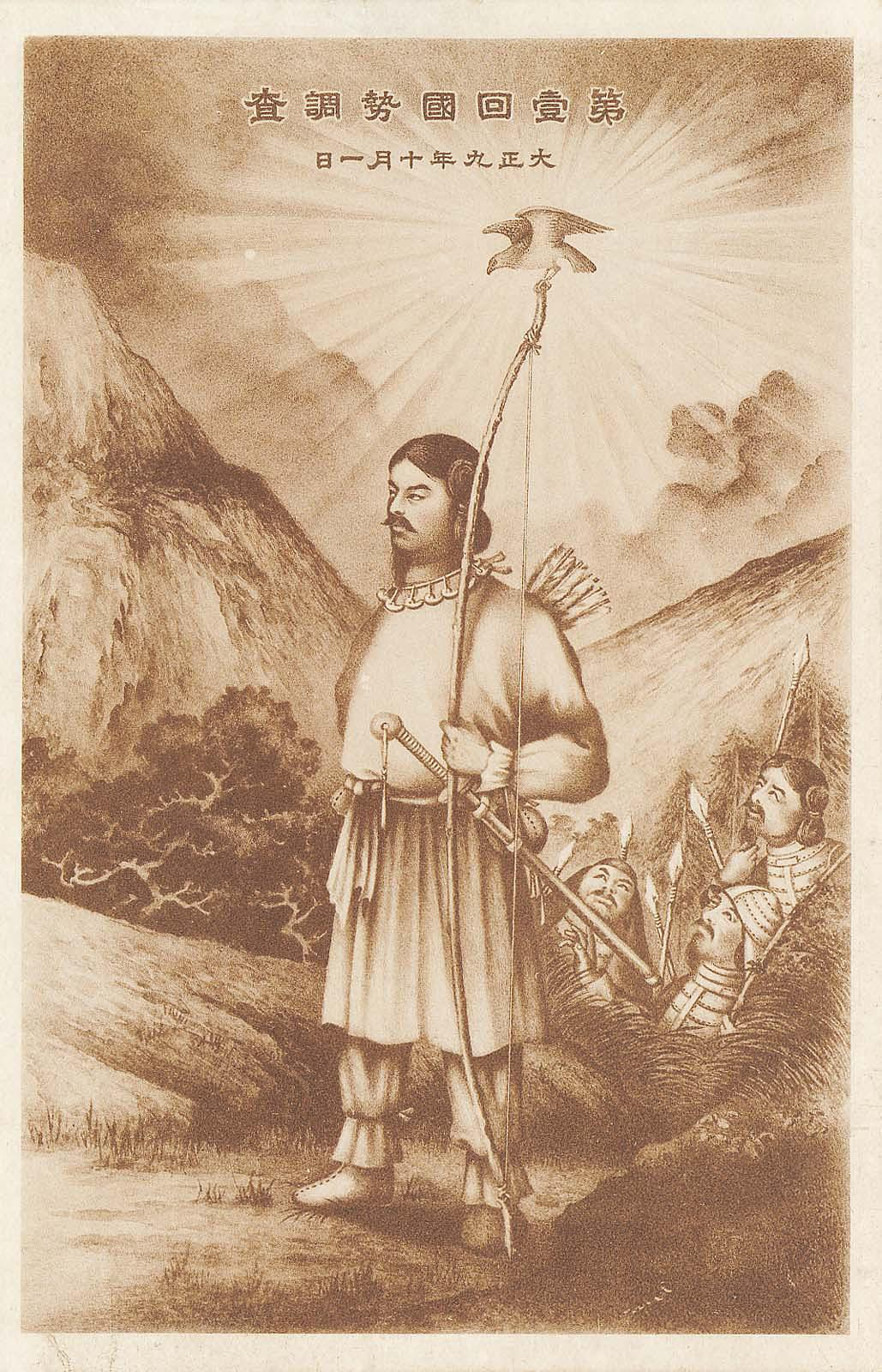
Emperor Jinmu on the cover of the first national census, 1920.

Jimmu's Eastern Expedition (神武東征, Jinmu tōsei) refers to a series of legends in which Emperor Jimmu became the first emperor of Japan, after defeating Nagasunehiko, who had ruled the Nara Basin and its surrounding area, after leaving Hyuga Province. According to the traditional dating system adopted in late 19th century, this expedition took place in 663 BC.

== Overview ==
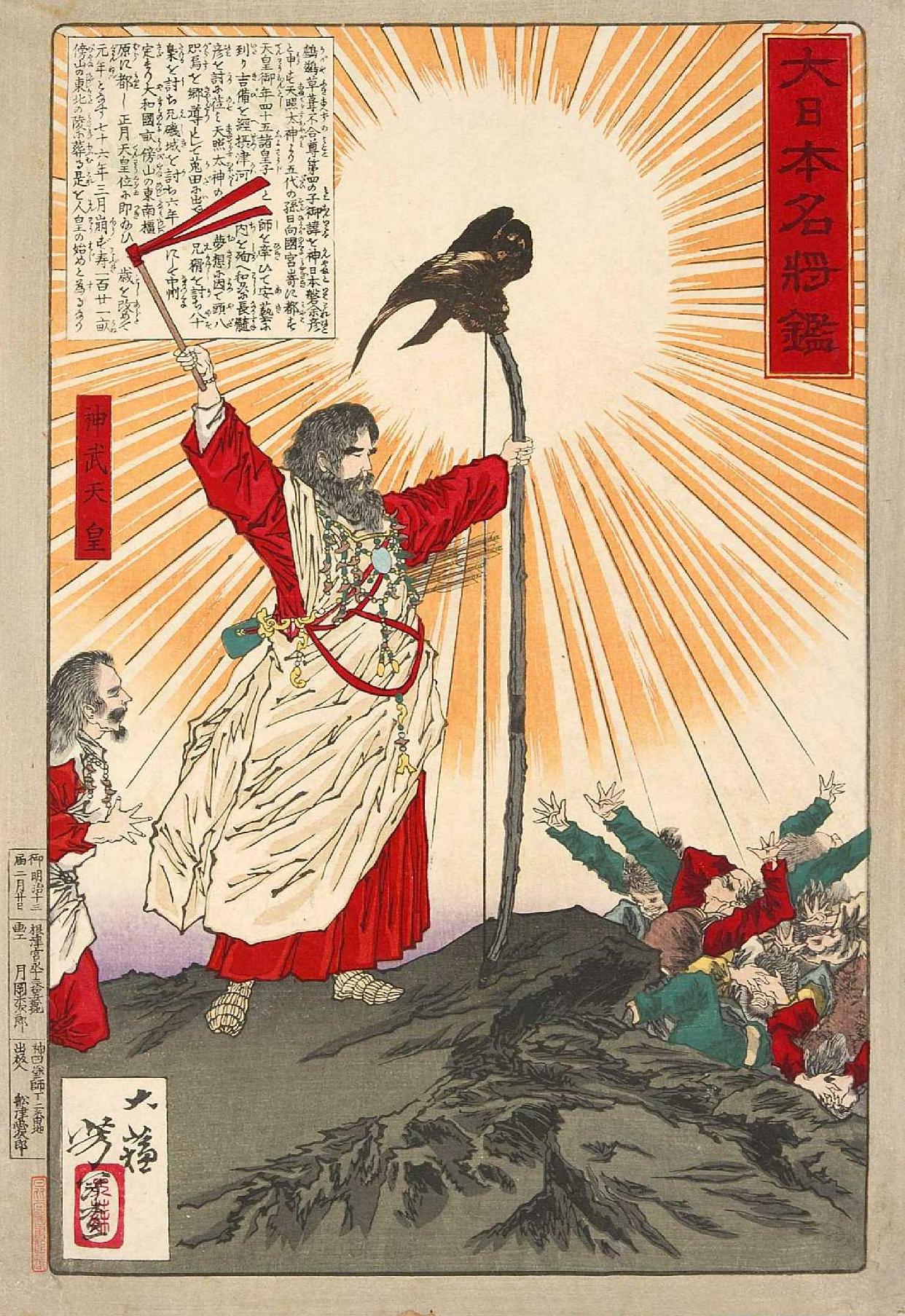
Depiction of a bearded Jimmu with his bow and the golden kite. This 19th-century artwork is by Tsukioka Yoshitoshi.

According to the chronicles Kojiki and Nihon Shoki, Jimmu's brothers were born in Takachiho, the southern part of Kyūshū in modern-day Miyazaki Prefecture. They moved eastward to find a location more appropriate for administering the entire country. Jimmu's older brother, Itsuse no Mikoto, originally led the migration, and led the clan eastward through the Seto Inland Sea with the assistance of local chieftain Sao Netsuhiko (根津日子). As they reached Naniwa (modern-day Osaka), they encountered another local chieftain, Nagasunehiko (長髄彦, "the long-legged man"), and Itsuse was killed in the ensuing battle. Jimmu realized that they had been defeated because they battled eastward against the sun, so he decided to land on the east side of Kii Peninsula and to battle westward. In Japanese legend, during battle with Nagasunehiko a kinki ("golden kite") landed on Jimmu's bow and emitted rays of dazzling light, helping Jimmu defeat his enemies. They reached Kumano and, with the guidance of the three-legged crow Yatagarasu ("eight-span crow"), they moved to Yamato. There, they once again battled Nagasunehiko and were victorious. The record in the Nihon Shoki of Emperor Jimmu states that his armed forces defeated a group of Emishi (蝦夷) before his enthronement. The historically known Emishi were an ethnic group who lived in Honshu, particularly the Tōhoku region.

In Yamato, Nigihayahi (邇芸速日), who also claimed descent from the Takamagahara gods, was protected by Nagasunehiko. However, when Nigihayahi met Jimmu, he accepted Jimmu's legitimacy. At that point, Jimmu is said to have ascended the throne of Japan. Upon scaling a Nara mountain to survey the Seto Inland Sea he then controlled, Jimmu remarked that it was shaped like the "heart" rings made by mating dragonflies, archaically called akitsu (秋津島). A mosquito then tried to steal Jimmu's royal blood but since Jimmu was a god incarnate Emperor, akitsumikami (現御神), a dragonfly killed the mosquito. Japan thus received its classical name the Dragonfly Islands, or Akitsushima (秋津島).

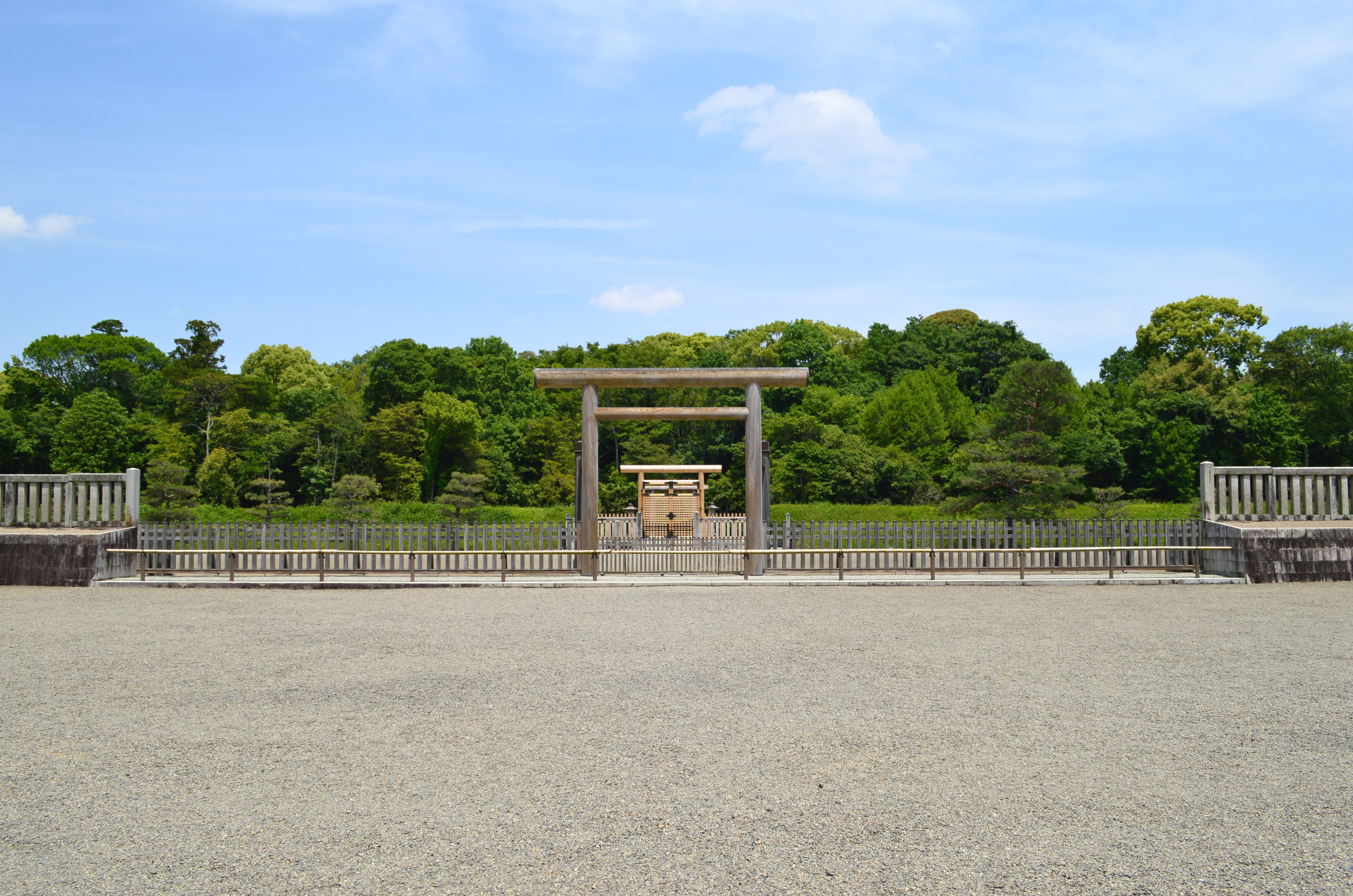
Unebi Goryō, the mausoleum of Jimmu in Kashihara City, Nara Prefecture

According to the Kojiki, Jimmu died when he was 137 years old. The Emperor's posthumous name literally means "divine might" or "god-warrior". It is generally thought that Jimmu's name and character evolved into their present shape just before the time in which legends about the origins of the imperial dynasty were chronicled in the Kojiki. There are accounts written earlier than either Kojiki or Nihon Shoki that present an alternate version of the story. According to those accounts, Jimmu's dynasty was supplanted by that of Ōjin, whose dynasty was supplanted by that of Keitai.

The Kojiki and the Nihon Shoki then combined those three legendary dynasties into one long and continuous genealogy. The traditional site of Jimmu's grave is near Mount Unebi in Kashihara, Nara Prefecture.

== Various theories ==
=== Northern Kyushu theory ===
The original starting point of the Jimmu expedition was the northern nine provinces. The rationale is as follows.

- The place of departure is listed as "Hyuga", not "Hyuga Province". In the Nihon Shoki, the name "Hyuga Province" is attributed to Emperor Keiko, so we can assume that the later name of Hyuga Province was not "Hyuga" at the time of the Jimmu expedition. In the Nakaueki, Hyuga is referred to as "the empty land of meat" and "the fruitless land of deer antlers", indicating that Hyuga was a land with little arable land where hunting was necessary. The construction of kofun (mound tombs) began in the late 4th century or 5th century indicate that the land was not "barren" and thus it seems unlikely to be the place where the Jimmu expedition departed.
- "Hyuga in Tsukushi" could be interpreted as "Hyuga in Tsukushi Province" (there is a place name of "Hyuga" in Fukuoka Prefecture), not "Hyuga Province in Kyushu". For example, even in the area of the stage of the Kyushu theory of the Evil Horse Kingdom, there is Hinata Toge between Itoshima City in Fukuoka Prefecture, where Itokuni was located, and Fukuoka City, where Nakoku was located, and the Hinata River, a second class river, flows there. In Asakura City, Fukuoka Prefecture, there is the Hinata River. In Asakura City, Fukuoka Prefecture, there is a place name called Hinataishi, and in the Yabe River basin of Yame City, Fukuoka Prefecture, there is a place name called Hinatajin. There is also a myth of the three generations of Hyuga in the Itoshima area, which differs from the Chronicles, and a large mirror with an inner scrolling flower design, compared to the Yata no Kagami by Harada Dairoku, was excavated from the Hirabara site.。

=== Timing of the Eastern Expedition ===
- According to Mitsunori Yasumoto, based on an average reign of about 10 years per generation in ancient times, the active period of Amaterasu would have been around 230–250, and the active period of Jimmu would have been around 280–300.
- Based on the average length of reign of foreign royalty and their biological lifespans, Hisao Hoga argues that the average length of reign of ancient emperors was 10 years per generation, which is an unusual figure, and advocates an average of 25 years. He also believes that the reigns of ancient emperors and foreign royalty were based on the X-multiple year calendar, and he puts the reign of Emperor Jinmu at 175–194 years.。

=== Negative theory ===
- Tadashi Nishitani states that it is unlikely that northern Kyushu conquered Kinki. The main reasons for this are that stone tools disappeared earlier in the Kinki region, and iron tools spread more quickly in earnest. Square trench tombs also migrated from Kinki to Kyushu, but Kyushu's tomb system (such as post stone tombs) did not spread to Kinki. In reality, however, this theory has little basis in fact, as iron arrowheads are said to have existed in the Yamataikoku of the Weijing biography, and many have actually been excavated in Kitakyushu, but few iron arrowheads of the 3rd century have been excavated in the Kinai region.。
- Studies on the movement of Shonai-style pottery during the Yamatai period confirm the movement of people from Kinki and Kibi to Kyushu, but conversely, there are no examples of pottery from Kyushu moving to Kinki and Kibi during this period (3rd century), making mass migration from Kyushu to Kinki during the Umataikoku period unlikely.。
- Reiji Harashima states that the imperial dynasty's rule over southern Kyushu is assumed to have begun in earnest during the period between the Suiko dynasty and the completion of the Chronicles, and that the story was formed in response to the invasion of Ryukyu by the Sui dynasty in 608, in order for the imperial dynasty to claim territorial rights over Ryukyu and adjacent southern Kyushu.。

==== Securing mercury ====
Ken'ichi Kamigaki, referring to mercury veins from Kinki to Shikoku in his book A Study of Niu: Mercury in Japan from the Perspective of Historical Geography (Waseda University Press), argues that the Jimmu expedition to the east was the result of a clan that had run out of resources such as mercury vermilion. In search of an economic base, the clan seized the mercury mines along the Kino River, invaded the Yamato mines in Uda (now shut down), and established the Yamato kingship in the late 3rd century.。

== See also ==
- Kashihara Shrine
- Origins of Japan
