= Susaki Shrine =

Shinto shrine in Japan

Susaki Jinja 洲崎神社
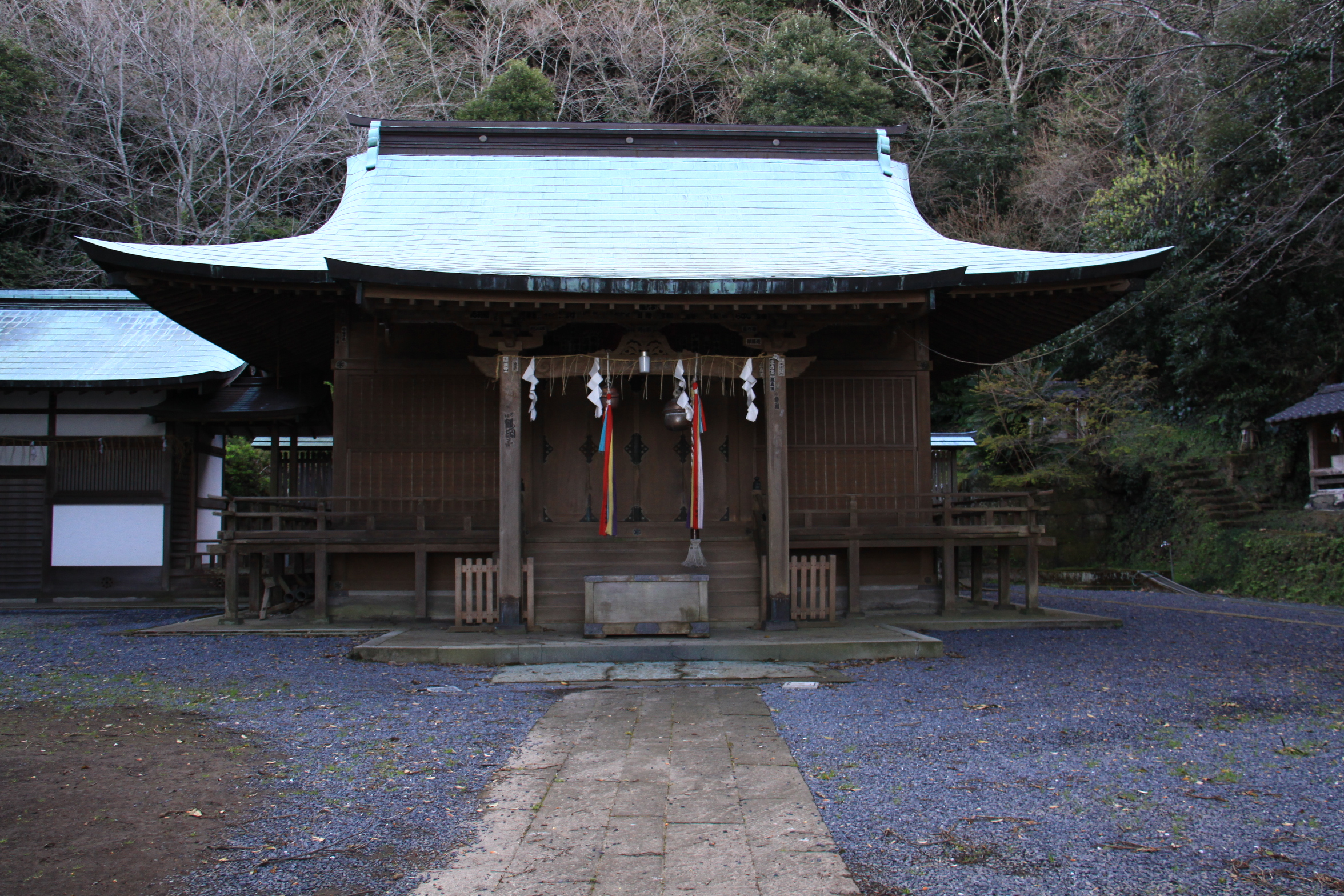
- Haiden of Susaki Jinja

- Location within Chiba Prefecture Location within Japan

Religion
- Affiliation: Shinto
- Deity: Ama no Hirinome
- Festival: August 10

Location
- Location: Susaki, Tateyama, Chiba
- Interactive map of Susaki Jinja 洲崎神社
- Coordinates: 34°58′5″N 139°45′29.60″E

Susaki Shrine (洲崎神社, Susaki Jinja) is a Shinto shrine in the Susaki neighborhood of the city of Tateyama in Chiba Prefecture, Japan. It is one of two shrines claiming to hold the title of ichinomiya of the former Awa Province. The main festival of the shrine is held annually on August 20.

== Enshrined kami ==
The primary kami enshrined at Susaki Jinja is:

- Ame-no-Hiritome-no-mikoto (天比理乃咩命), the consort of Ame-no-Futodama-no-Mikoto who is worshipped at the Awa Shrine.

== History ==
Per the Kogo Shūi records dated 807 AD, early during the reign of the legendary Emperor Jimmu, Ame-no-Tomi, landed on the Bōsō Peninsula in what is now the province of Awa in search of fertile land, and established a settlement together with the Inbe clan. He brought with him a mirror which had been owned by his grandmother, Ama no Hirinome, which he enshrined on Mount Mitarai, and this was the start of the Susaki Shrine. According to the shrine's legend, during the Asuka period, the shrine was visited by En no Gyōja after a landslide had buried the "mirror pond" in the precincts, thus releasing a great snake which had to be vanquished. In addition, En no Gyōja placed one sacred stone on the coast in front of a torii gate which faced the coast, and another at the Awakuchi Shrine in Yokosuka on the opposite side of Tokyo Bay for maritime safety. These legends illustrate the close connection the shrine had with Shinbutsu-shūgō and Shugendō. Since ancient times, the shrine had the right to collect toll taxes from passing ships.

The shrine is mentioned in the Shoku Nihon Kōki, Nihon Montoku Tennō Jitsuroku and Nihon Sandai Jitsuroku as well as the Engishiki, and although a relatively small shrine, had attained the highest rank by 1081. This was partly due to the patronage of Minamoto no Yoritomo, who landed on the coast close to this shrine after his defeat at the Battle of Ishibashiyama. Per the Azuma Kagami, he credited the shrine with his safe passage, and for helping rally the local samurai bands of the Bōsō Peninsula to his banner to overthrow the Heike clan. In the late Edo Period, while surveying the coastline of Edo Bay with the purpose of establishing coastal defenses, the rōjū Matsudaira Sadanobu wrote an account in which he referred to the shine as the "Awa Ichinomiya Susaki Daimyōjin". This is the first mention of the shrine as the "Ichinomiya" of the province. After the Meiji Restoration, the Susaki Jinja was designated the rank of prefectural shrine under the Modern system of ranked Shinto Shrines under State Shinto.

== Gallery ==
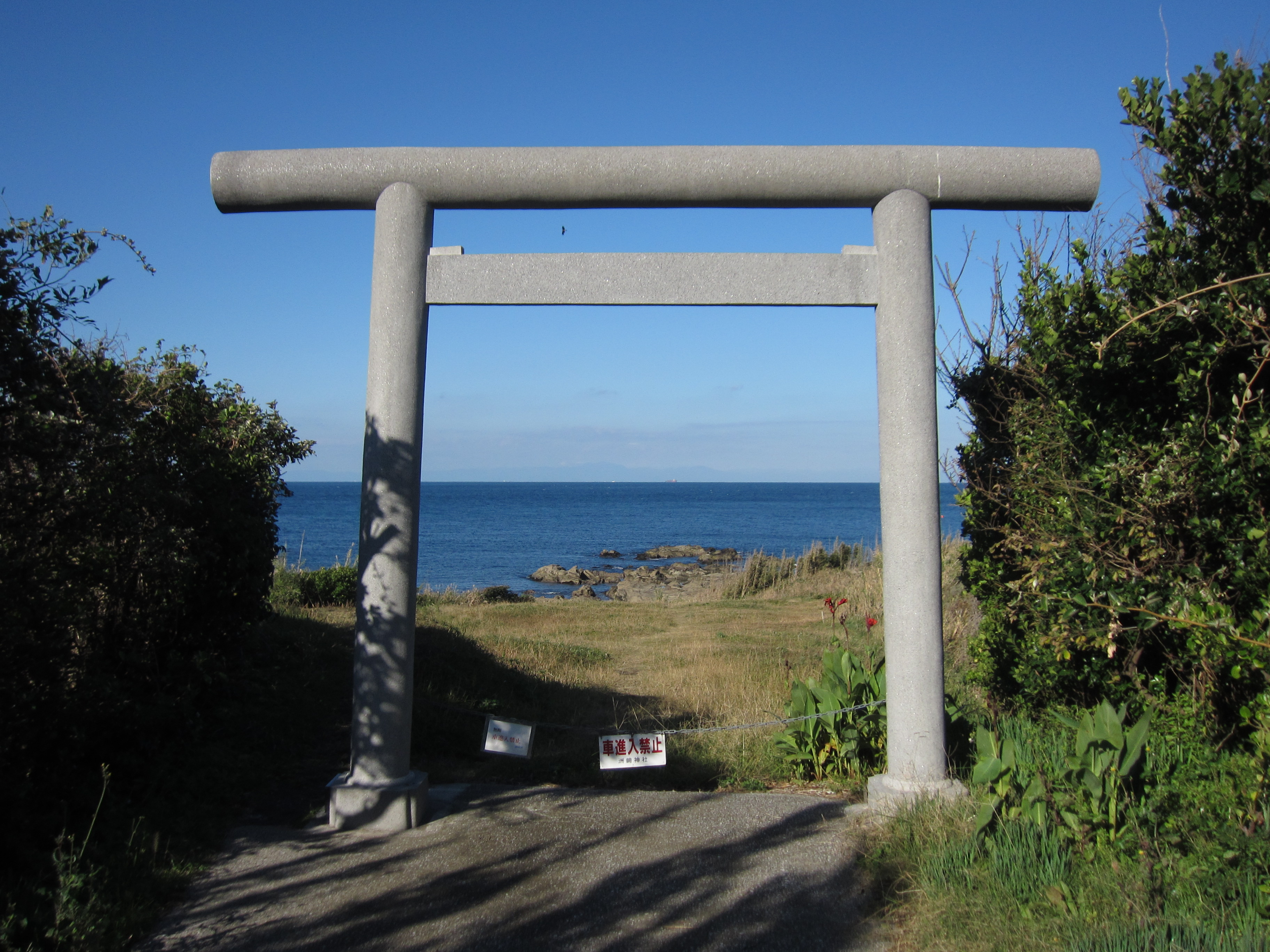
Seaside Torii

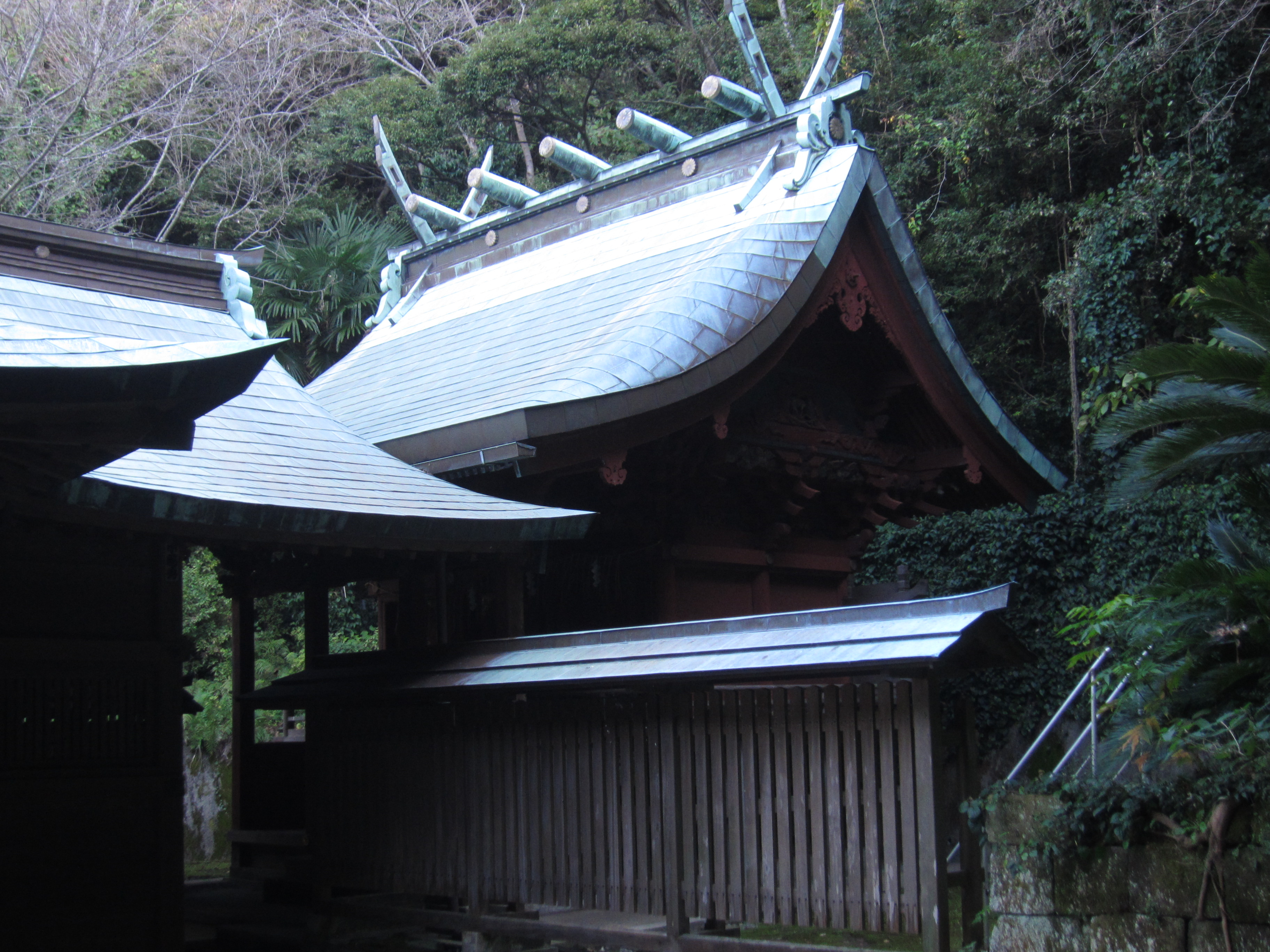
Honden

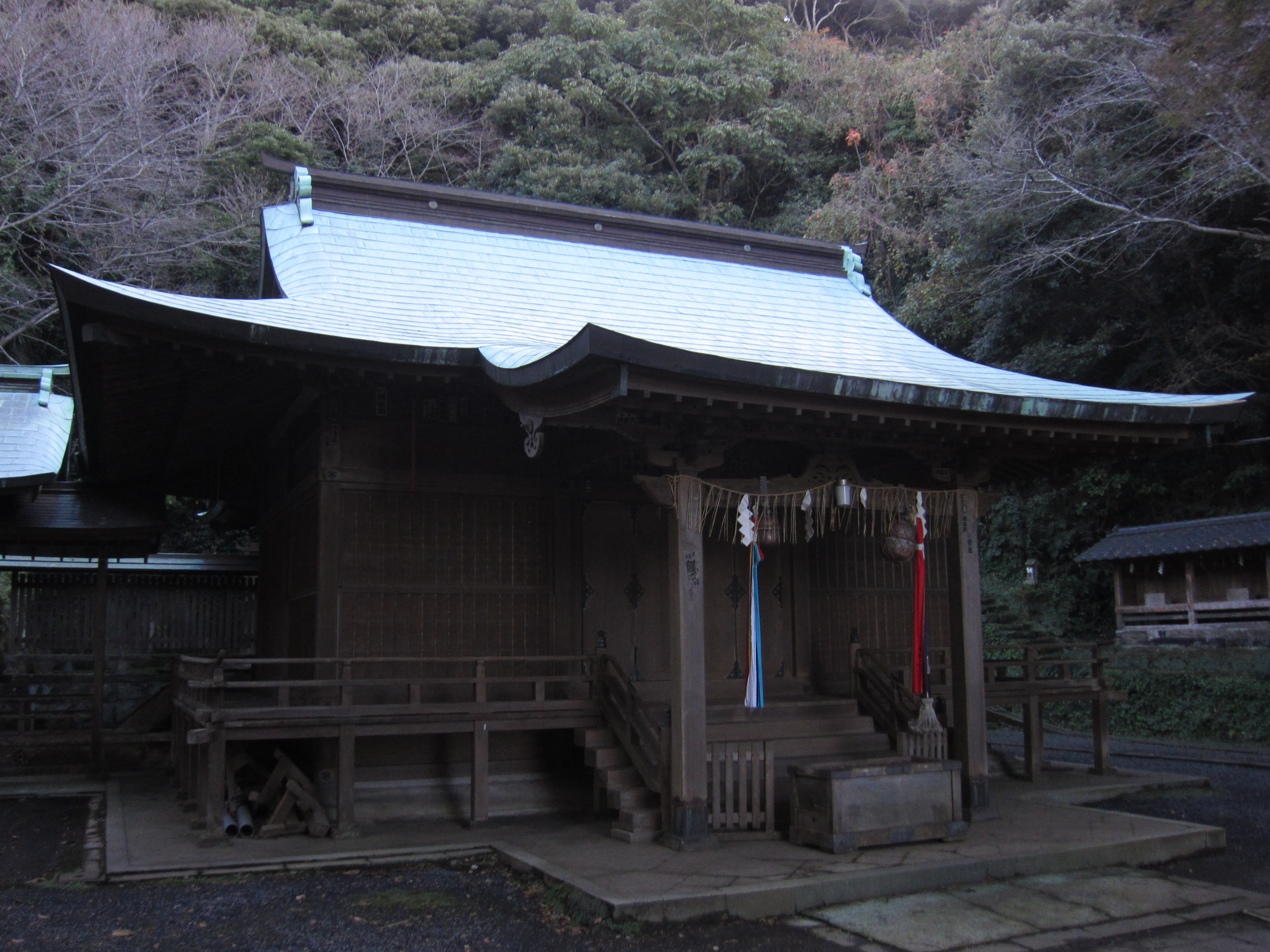
Haiden

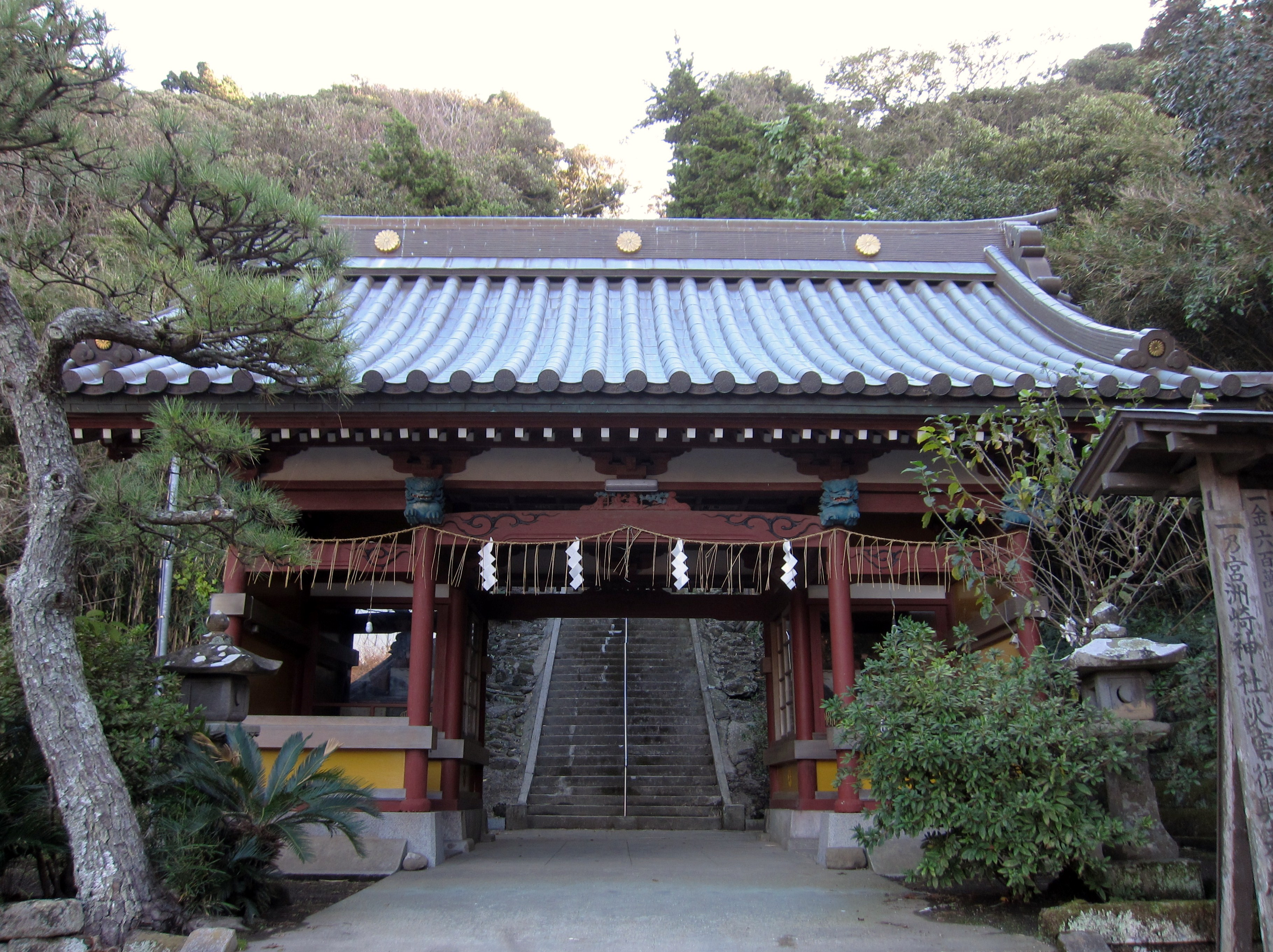
Zuishin-mon

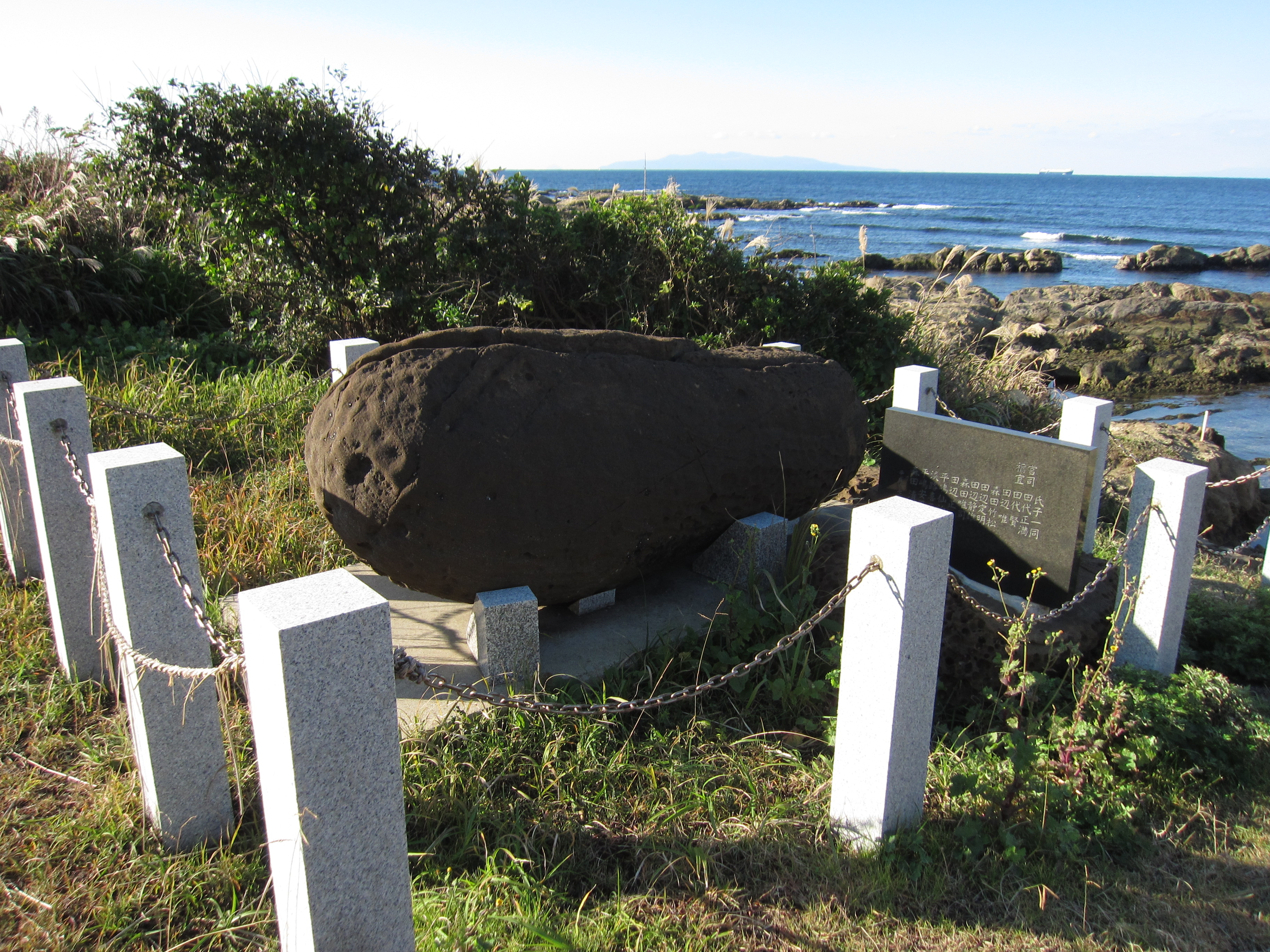
Sacred Stone

== See also ==
- List of Shinto shrines
- Ichinomiya
