= Awa Shrine =

Shinto shrine in Japan

Awa Jinja 安房神社
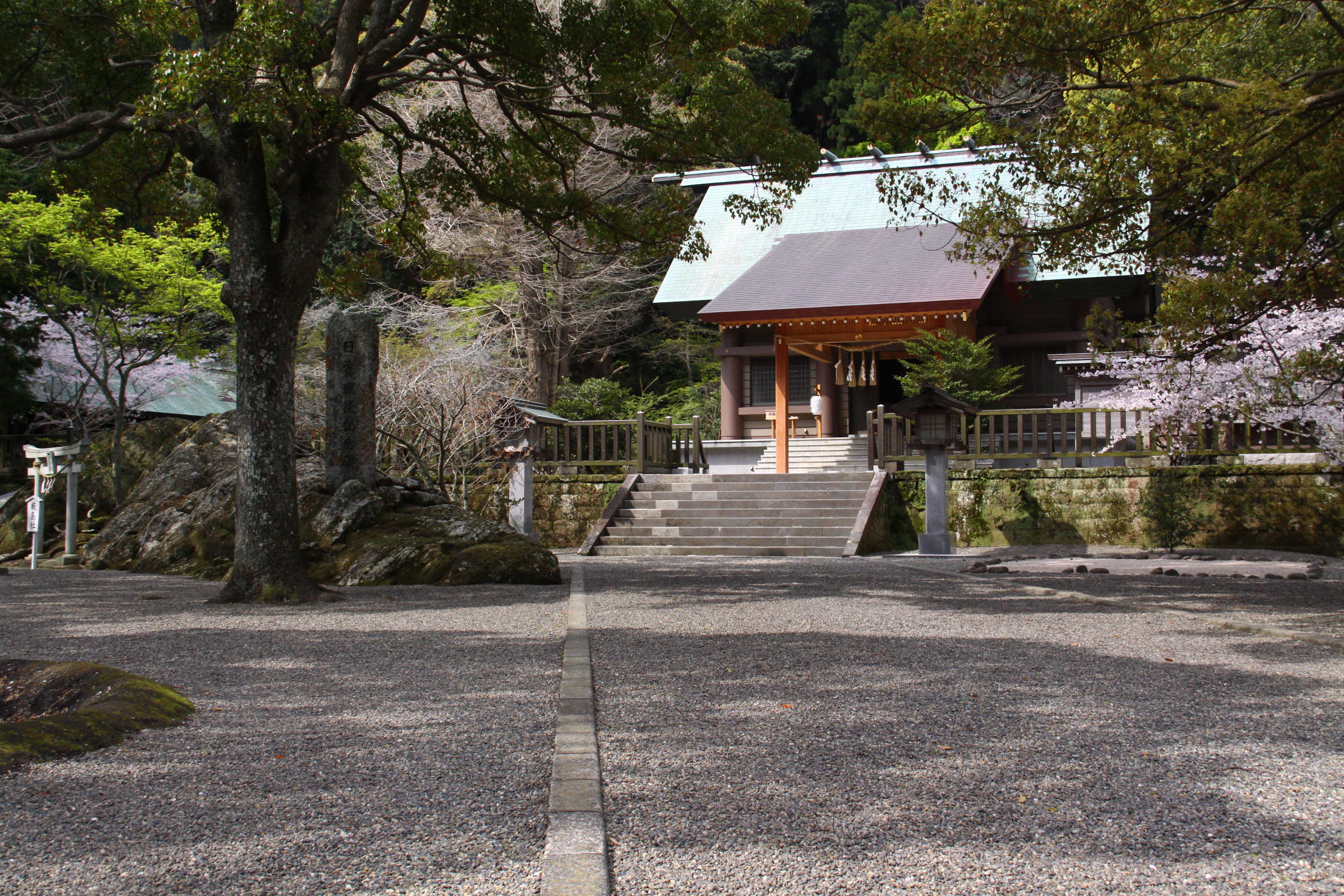
- Precincts of Awa Jinja

- Location within Chiba Prefecture Location within Japan

Religion
- Affiliation: Shinto
- Deity: Ame-no-Futodama
- Festival: August 10

Location
- Location: 589 Daijngū, Tateyama, Chiba 294-0233
- Interactive map of Awa Jinja 安房神社
- Coordinates: 34°55′20.80″N 139°50′12.25″E

Website
- Official website

Awa Shrine (安房神社, Awa Jinja) is a Shinto shrine in the Daijingū neighborhood of the city of Tateyama in Chiba Prefecture, Japan. It is one of two shrines claiming to hold the title of ichinomiya of former Awa Province. The main festival of the shrine is held annually on August 10.

== Enshrined kami ==
The primary kami enshrined at Awa Jinja is:

- Ame-no-Futodama-no-mikoto (天太玉命), the ancestor of Imbe clan

The secondary kami enshrined at Awa Jinja are:

- Ame-no-hiritome-no-mikoto (天乃比理刀咩命), consort of Ame-no-Futodama
- Kushiakarutama-no-mikoto (櫛明玉命), ancestor of the Izumo Imbe clan, the creator of Yasakani no Magatama
- Ame-no-hiwashi-no-mikoto (天日鷲命), ancestor of the Awa Imbe clan
- Taokihooi-no-mikoto (手置帆負命), ancestor of the Saga Imbe clan
- Hikosashiri-no-mikoto (彦狭知命),, ancestor of the Kii Imbe clan
- Ame-no-mahitotsu-no-mikoto (天目一箇命), ancestor of the Tsukushi and Ise Imbe clans

== History ==
The date of Awa Shrine’s foundation is unknown. Shrine tradition and the Kogo Shūi records of 807 AD gives the founder as a member of the Inbe clan, (the precursors to the Nakatomi clan) during the reign of the legendary Emperor Jimmu, who settled in this area from Awa Province in Shikoku. The shrine is mentioned several times in the early Heian period Rikkokushi and it is mentioned again in the Engishiki records. It was patronized by Minamoto no Yoritomo in the Kamakura period and was recognized as the ichinomiya of the province since around this time. The shrine was completely destroyed by a large earthquake in 1499, and was rebuilt in 1593 by Satomi Yoshinari. The Satomi clan rebuilt the shrine again in 1536 and around 1592. Subsequently, in the Edo Period it was granted stipends from the Tokugawa shogunate in 1616 and 1637. After the Meiji Restoration, the Awa Shrine was designated the rank of Imperial shrine, 1st rank (国幣大社, Kokuhei Taisha) under the Modern system of ranked Shinto Shrines under State Shinto in 1875. The present Honden dates from 1881 and was renovated in 2009.

During archaeological investigations in 1931, numerous Jōmon and Kofun period artifacts were recovered, including a number of bronze mirrors, clay vessels and the skeletons of 22 people.

The shrine is a ten-kilometer walk from Tateyama Station on the JR East Uchibo Line.

== Gallery ==
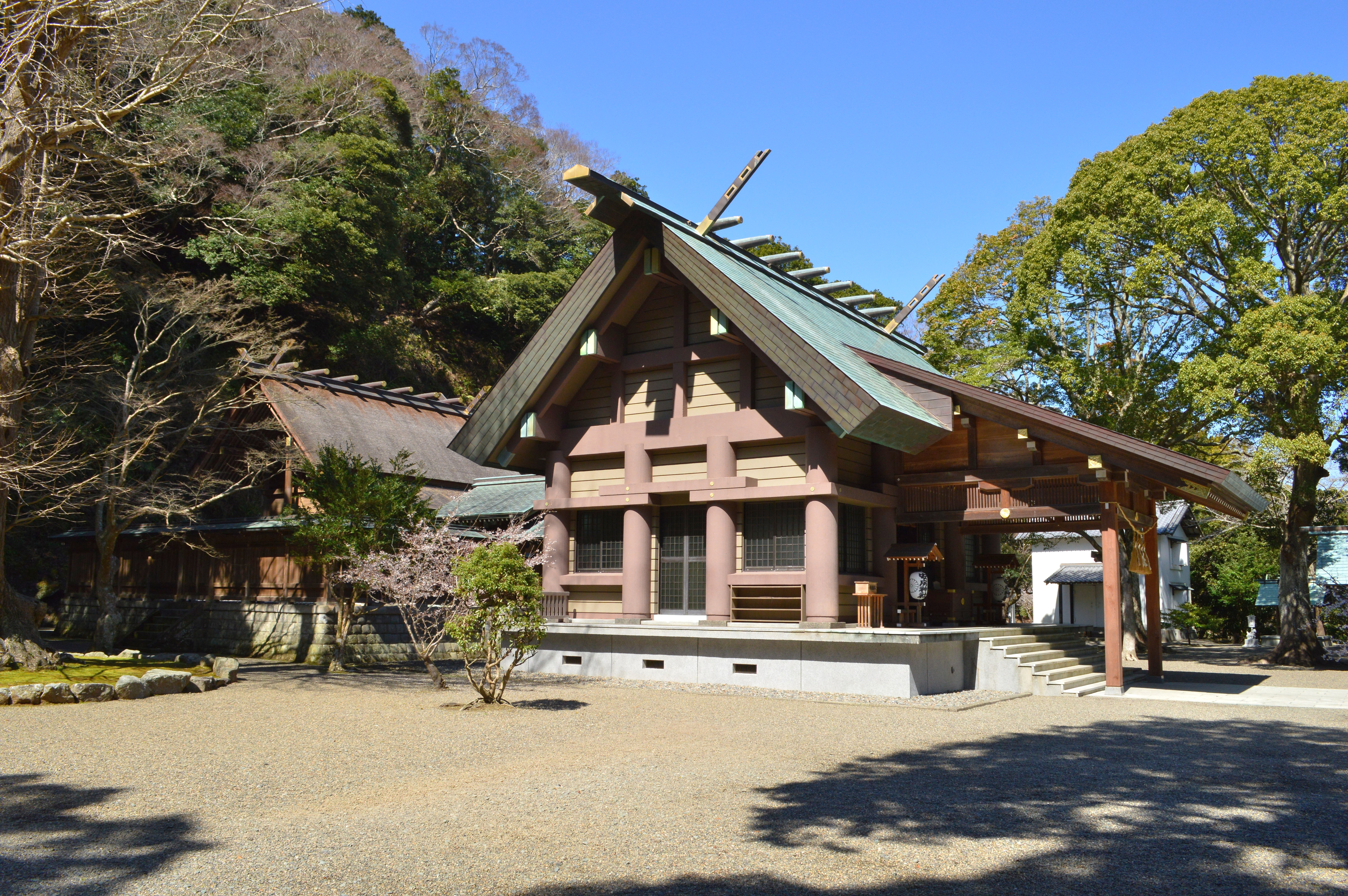
Shaden

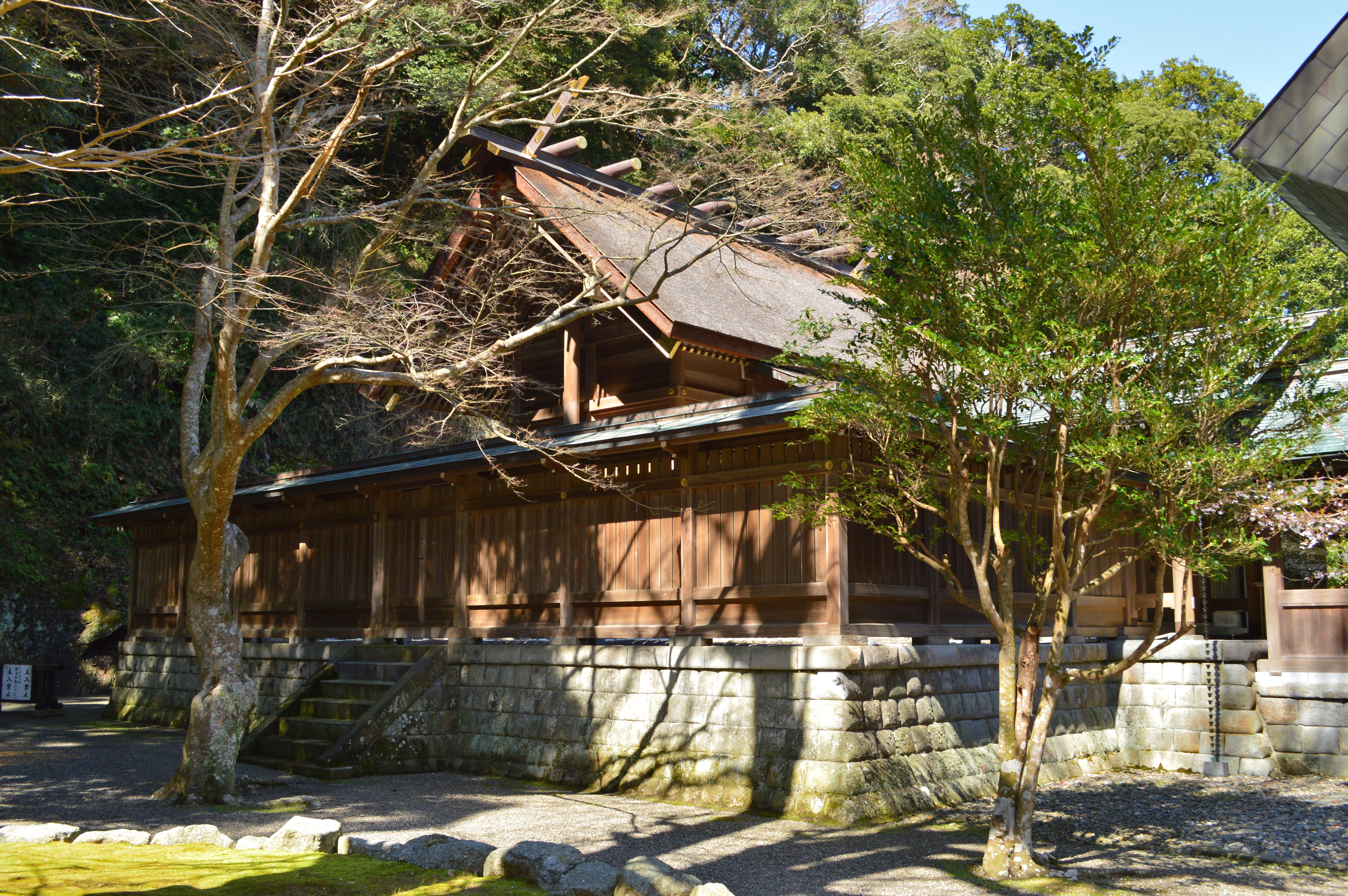
Honden

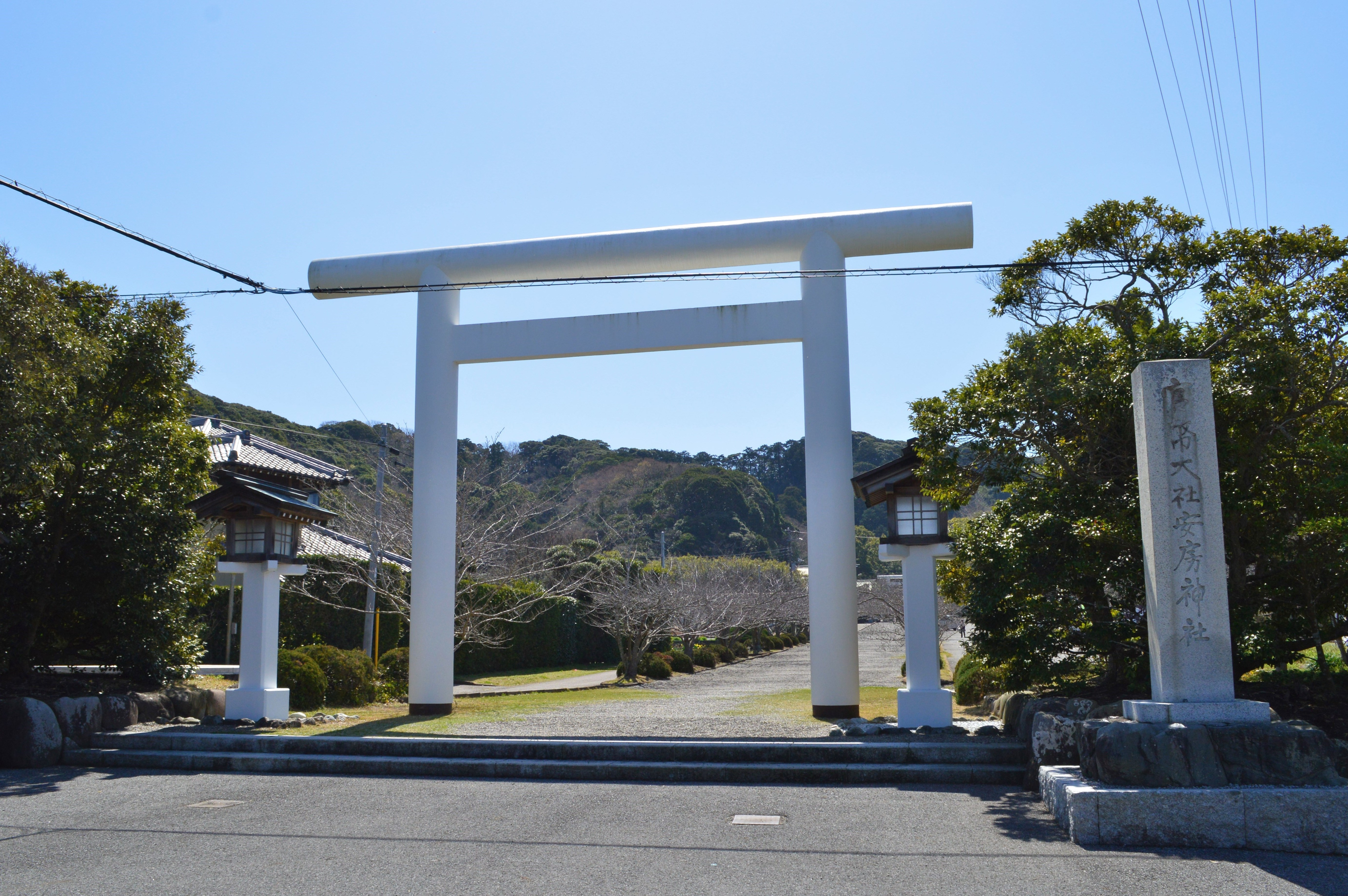
Ichi-no-torii

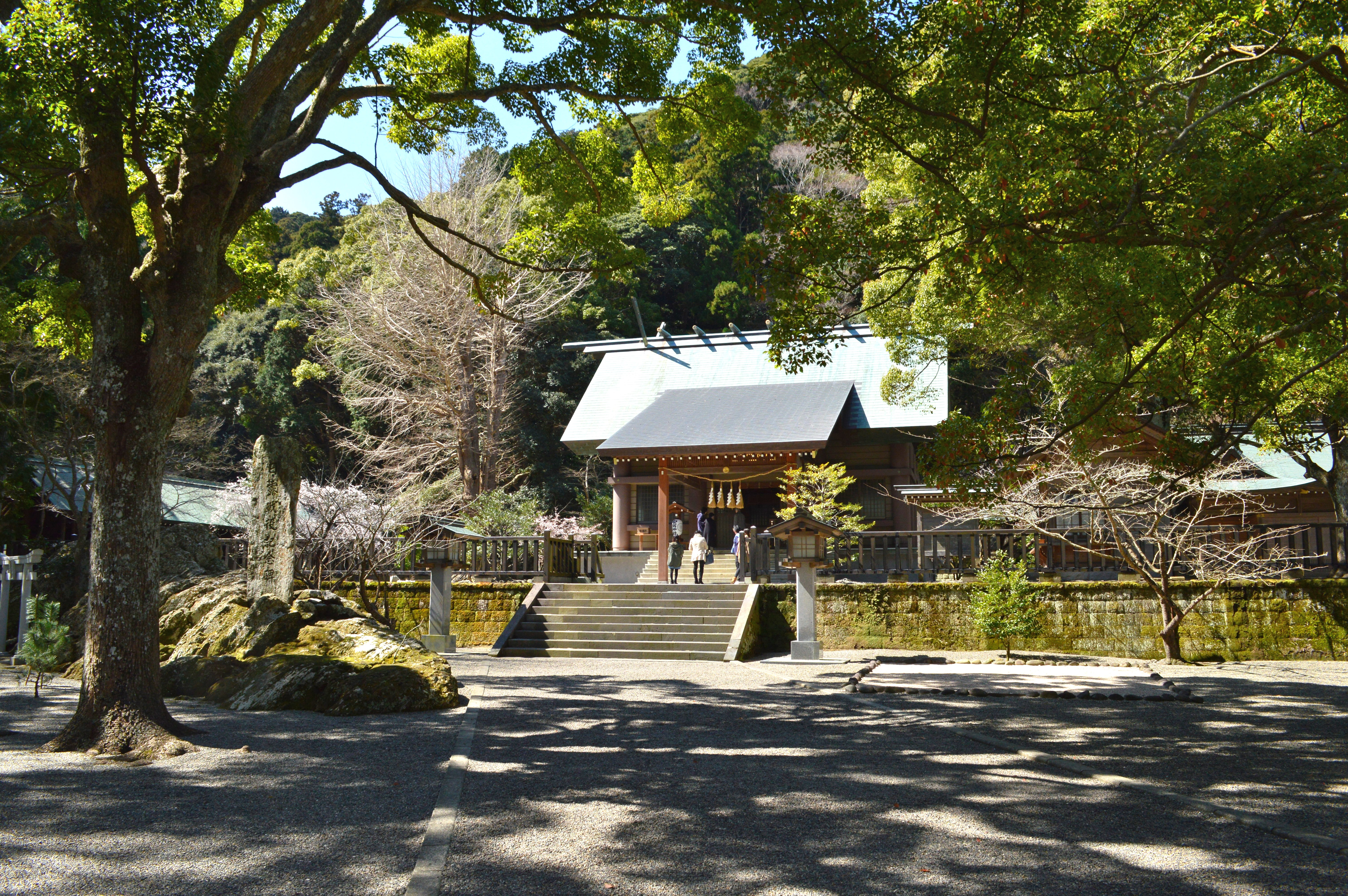
Precincts

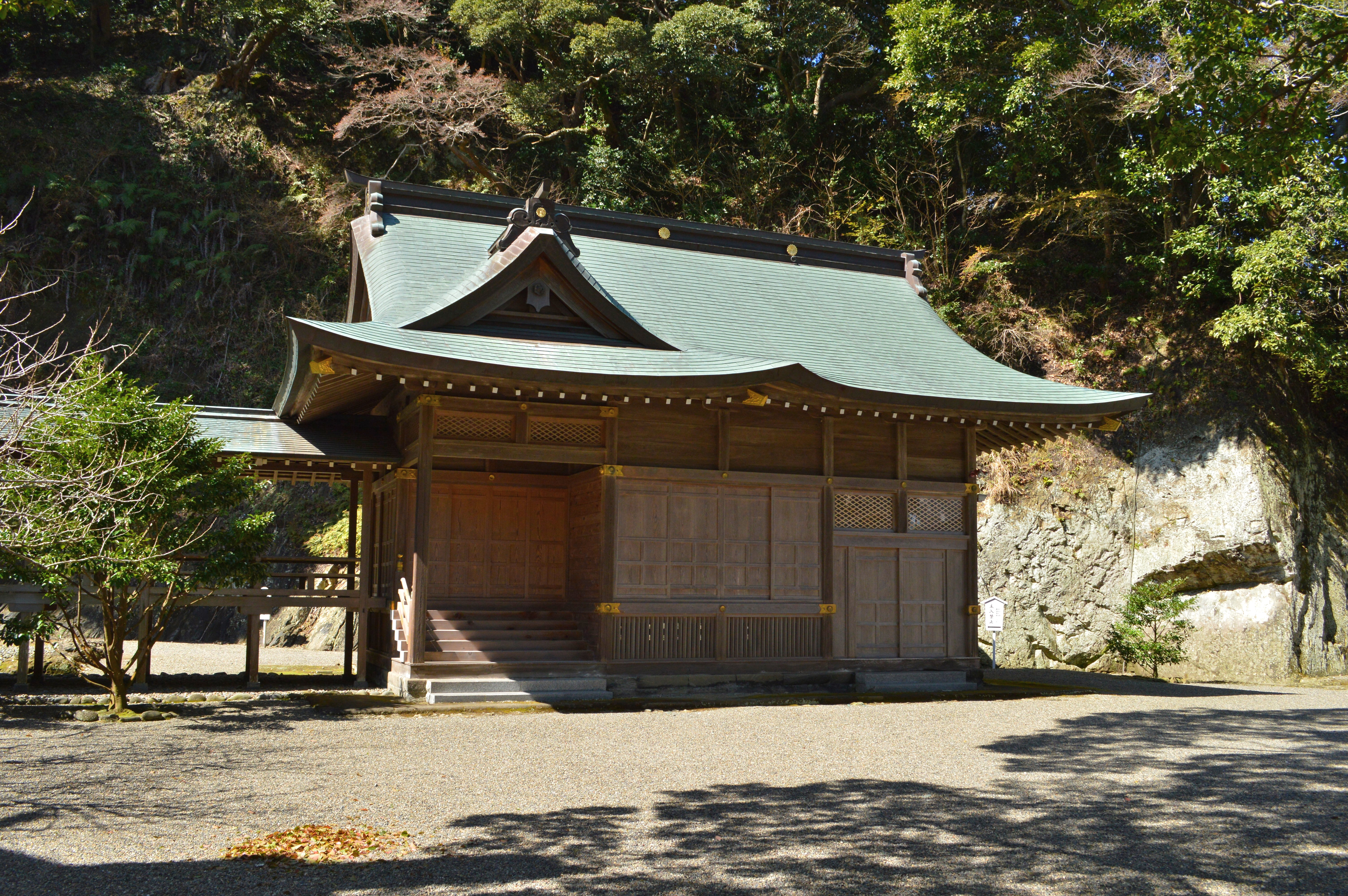
Shinen-jo

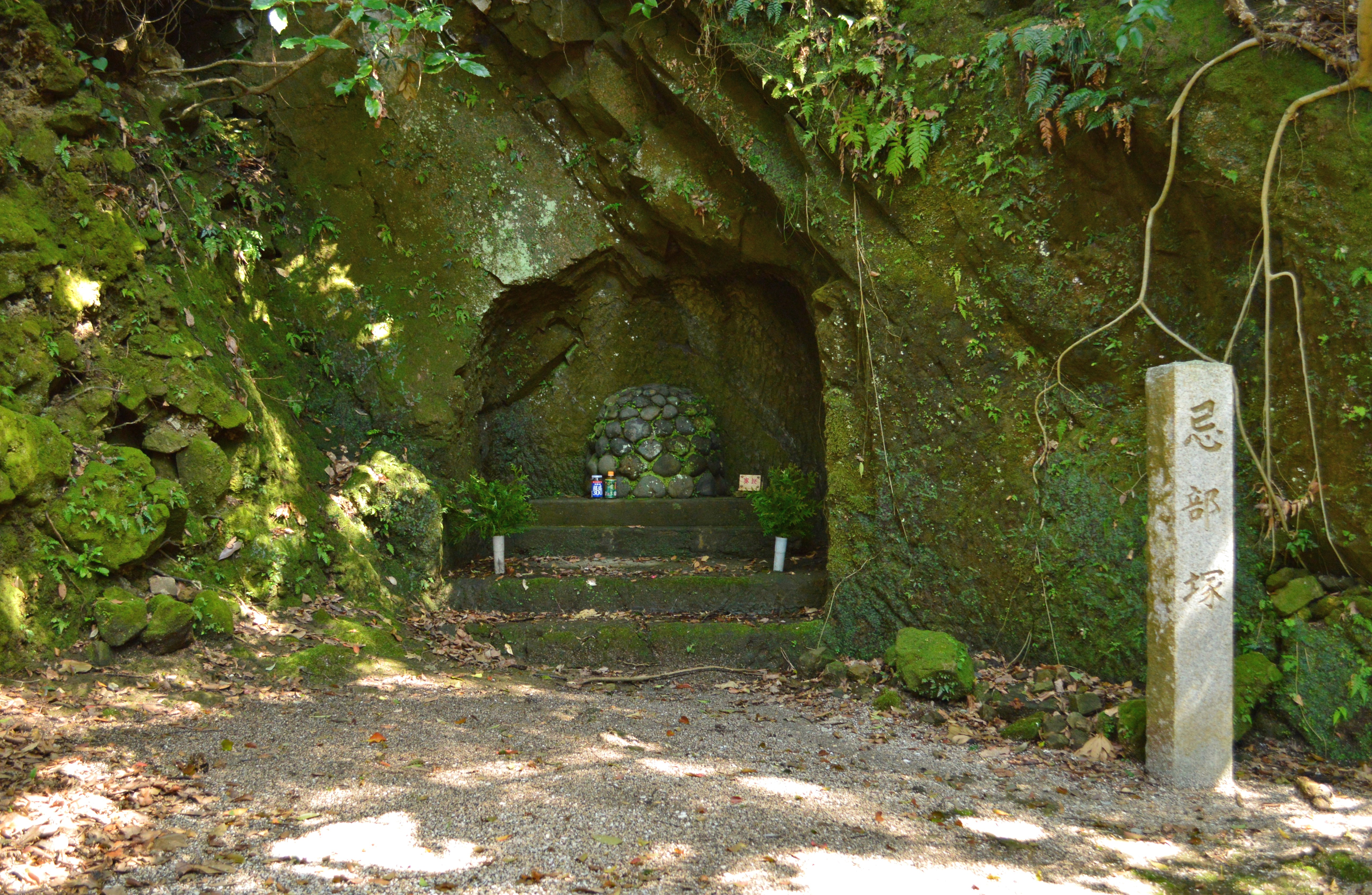
Imbe-zuka

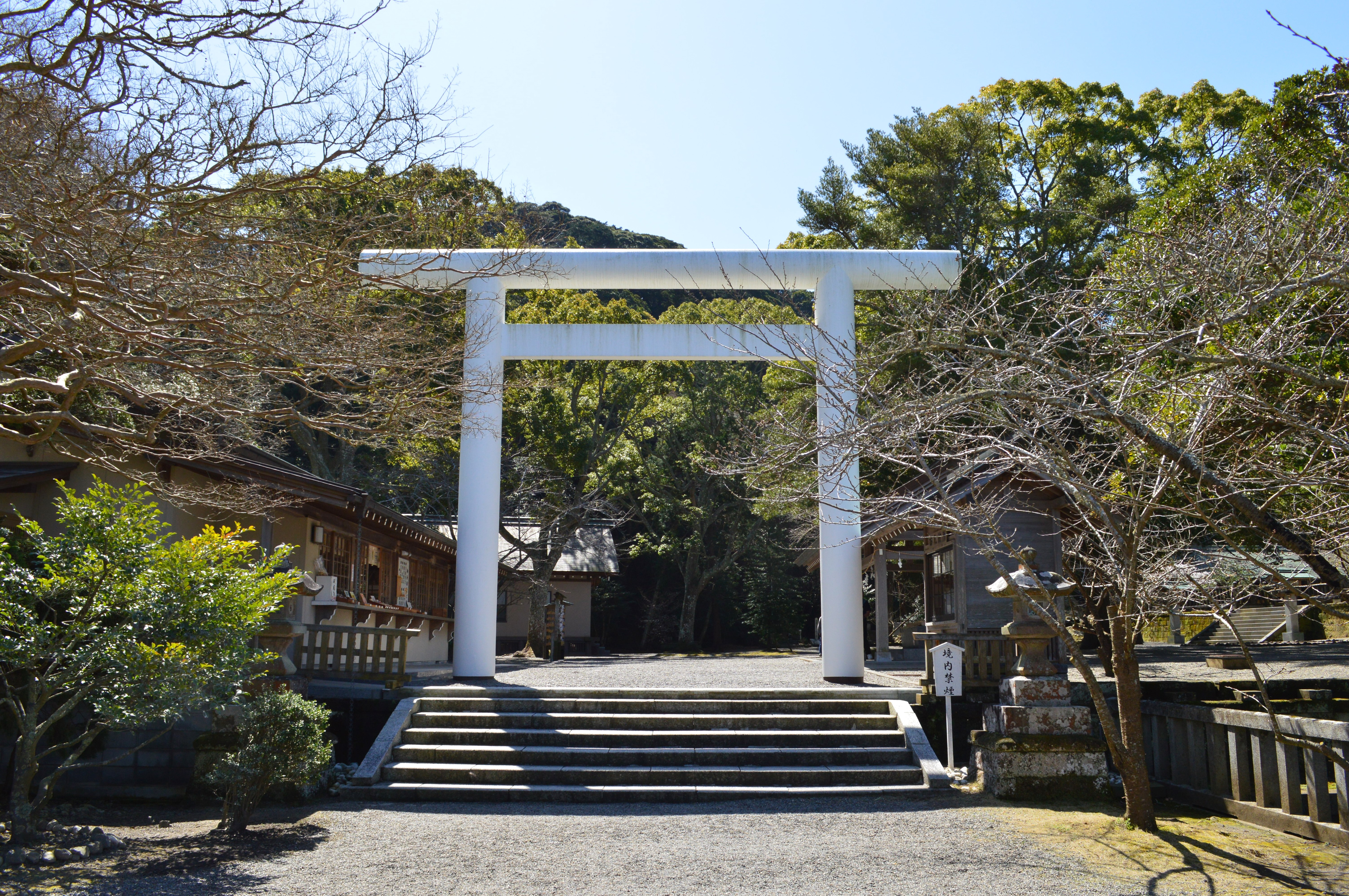
Ni-no-Torii

== Cultural Properties ==
=== Chiba Prefecture Historic Site ===
- Awa Jinja Cave Site (安房神社洞窟遺跡). Located within the grounds of Awa Shrine, this cave was discovered by chance in 1932, about one meter below the surface, during reconstruction work following the Great Kanto Earthquake. The cave, measuring approximately 11 meters in length, two meters in height, and 1.5 meters in width, is a sea cave with an opening in the northeast. A rescue archaeology excavation was conducted, unearthing 22 human bones, 193 shell bracelets, three stone beads, and pottery. While reports at the time identified the pottery as Yayoi pottery, current opinion is that it is Tōkai-type pottery from the end of the Late Jōmon period. Of the 22 human bones excavated, 15 showed signs of tooth ablation, which was a common practice in Japan from the late to final Jomon period. Some of the discovered human bones were reburied at the "Imbezuka, " which is believe to be the burial mound of the ancestors of the Imbe clan.

== See also ==
- List of Shinto shrines
- Ichinomiya
