= Amatsu Shrine =

Shinto shrine in Japan

- 天津神社
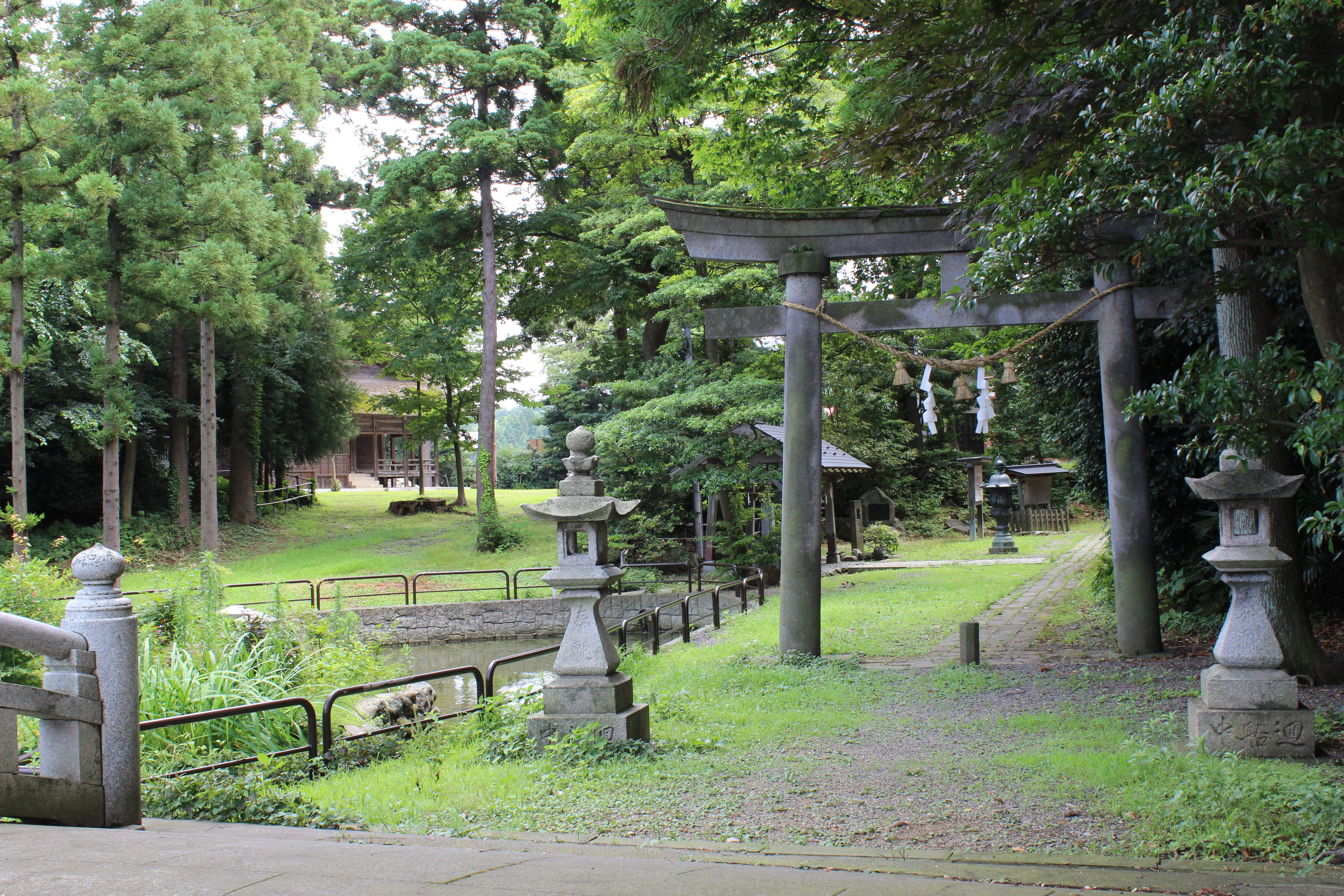
- Amatsu Shrine, July 2013

- Amatsu Jinja Amatsu Shrine (Japan)

Religion
- Affiliation: Shinto
- Deity: Ninigi-no-Mikoto; Nunakawahime
- Festival: April 10, Oct 24
- Type: Ichinomiya

Location
- Location: 1-3-34 Ichinomiya, Itoigawa-shi, Niigata-ken
- Interactive map of Amatsu Shrine
- Coordinates: 37°2′24.5″N 137°51′51.3″E

Amatsu Shrine (天津神社, Amatsu jinja) is a Shinto shrine located in the Ichinomiya neighborhood of the city of Itoigawa, Niigata, Japan. It is one of the three shrines claiming the title of ichinomiya of the former Echigo Province. The main festivals of the shrine are held annually on April 10 and October 24.

== Enshrined kami ==
The kami enshrined at Amatsu Jinja are:

- Ninigi-no-Mikoto (瓊瓊杵尊), known here as Amatsuhikohikoho Ninigi no mikoto; grandson of the sun goddess Amaterasu, and the great-grandfather of Emperor Jimmu.
- Ame-no-Koyane (天児屋根神), ancestor of the Fujiwara clan
- Futodama no mikoto (太玉命), ancestor of the Imbe clan

== History ==
Amatsu Jinja claims to have been founded during the reign of the semi-legendary Emperor Keikō (71 to 130 AD) in the Kofun period. Historical records state that Emperor Kōtoku (596-694 AD) had prayers said at this shrine, and its name appears in the Engishiki records compiled in 927 AD as the major shrine of ancient Kubiki County in Echigo, although it is by no means certain that the current Amatsu Shrine is the same shrine mentioned in these ancient records. In 1611, the Tokugawa shogunate awarded the shrine a stipend of 100 koku for its upkeep. After the Meiji Restoration and the establishment of State Shinto, the shrine was originally designated as a "county shrine", but was later raised in status to that of a prefectural shrine (県社).

The Heiden of the shrine is an irimoya-style 7 x 5 bay building with a thatch roof built in 1662. The Haiden is a gabled 3x2 bay structure with a copper roof built in 1797.

The shrine is located a ten-minute walk from Itoigawa Station.

== Subsidiary shrine ==
Within the shrine grounds is the Nunagawa Shrine (奴奈川神社, Nunagawa jinja), which also appears in the Engishiki records. The building is a one-bay structure with a Nagare-zukuri roof and was built in 1798.

== Gallery ==
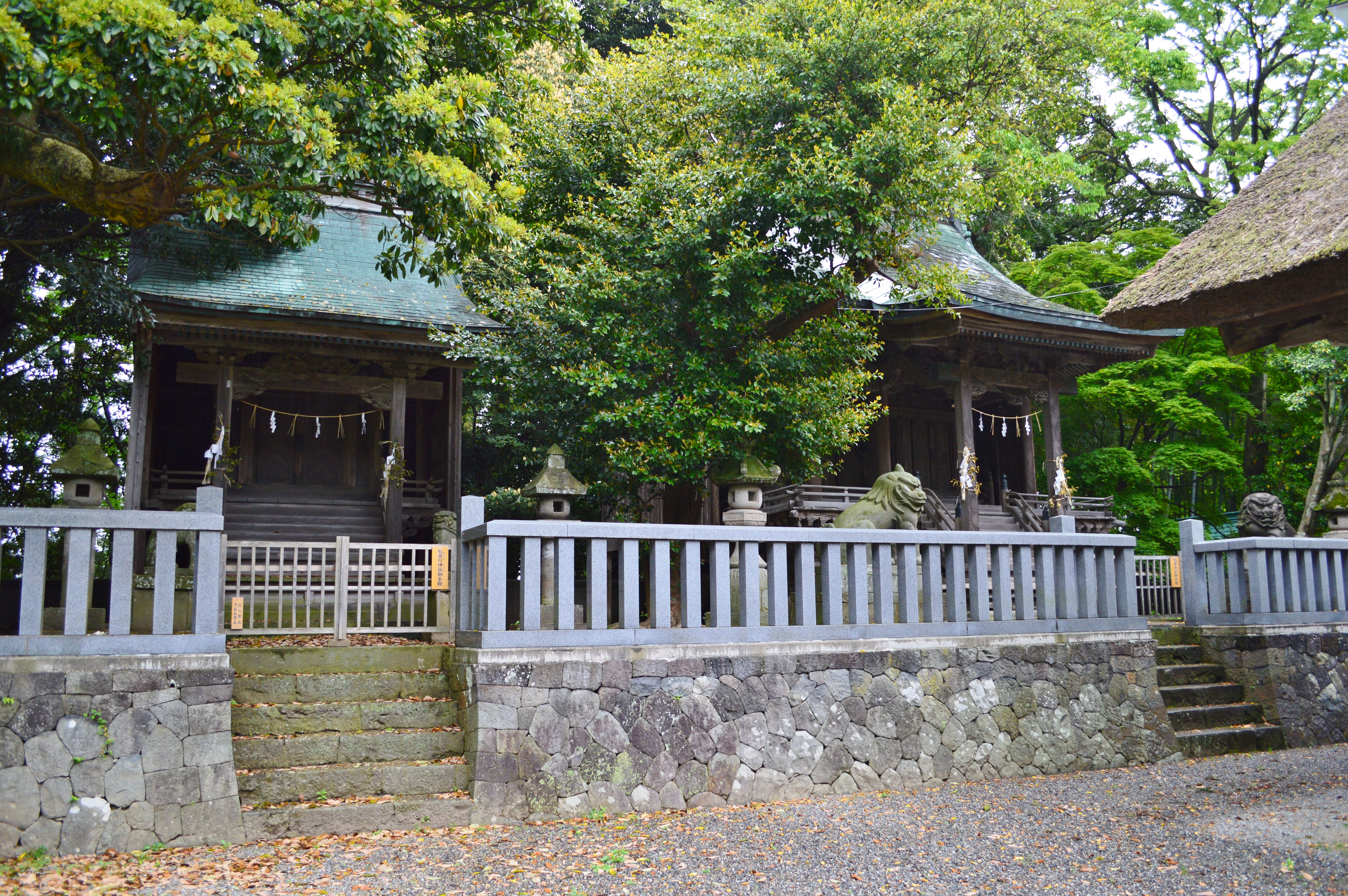
Honden（right）・Nunagawa Shrine（left）

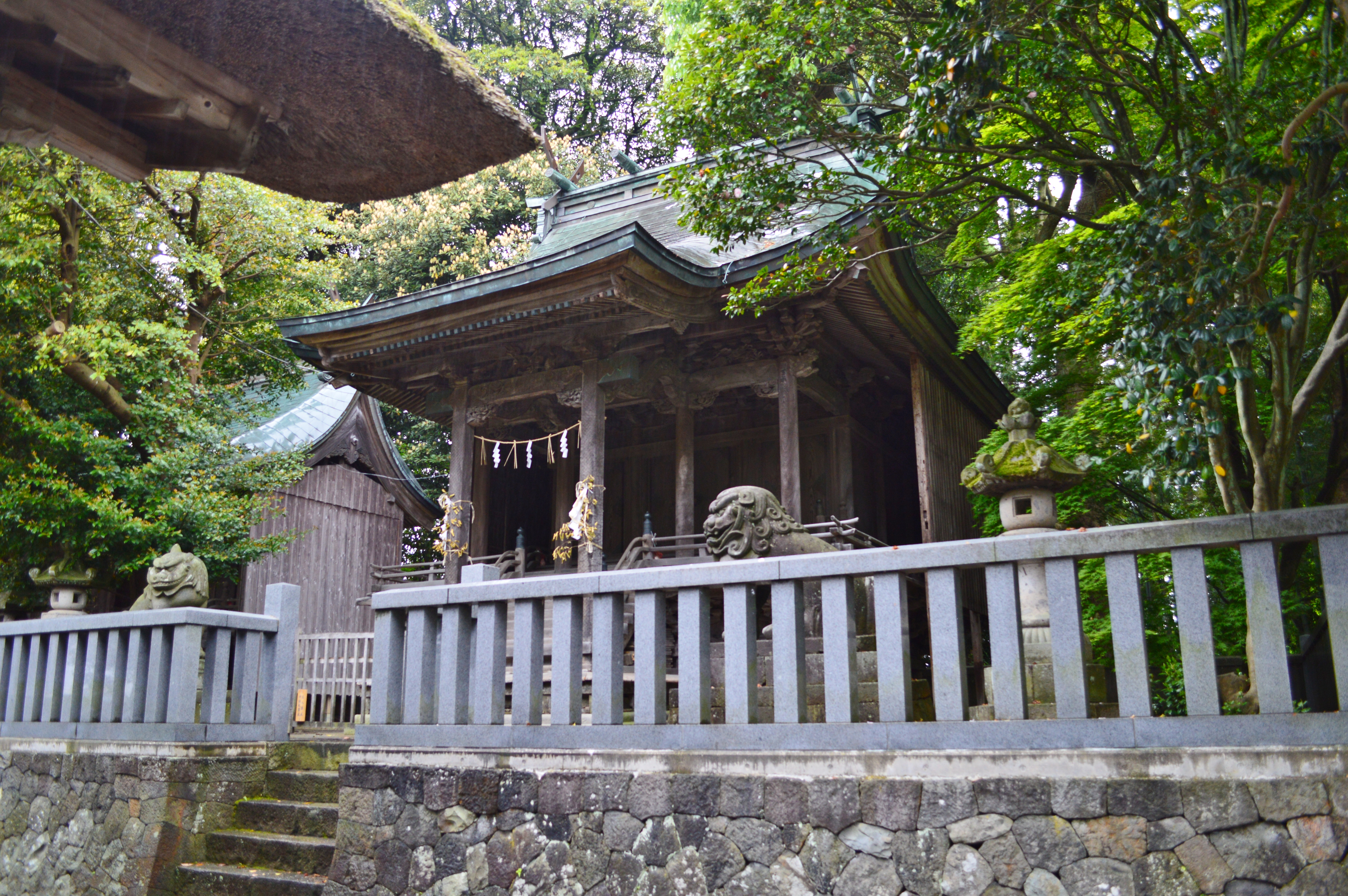
Honden（Itoigawa City ICP）

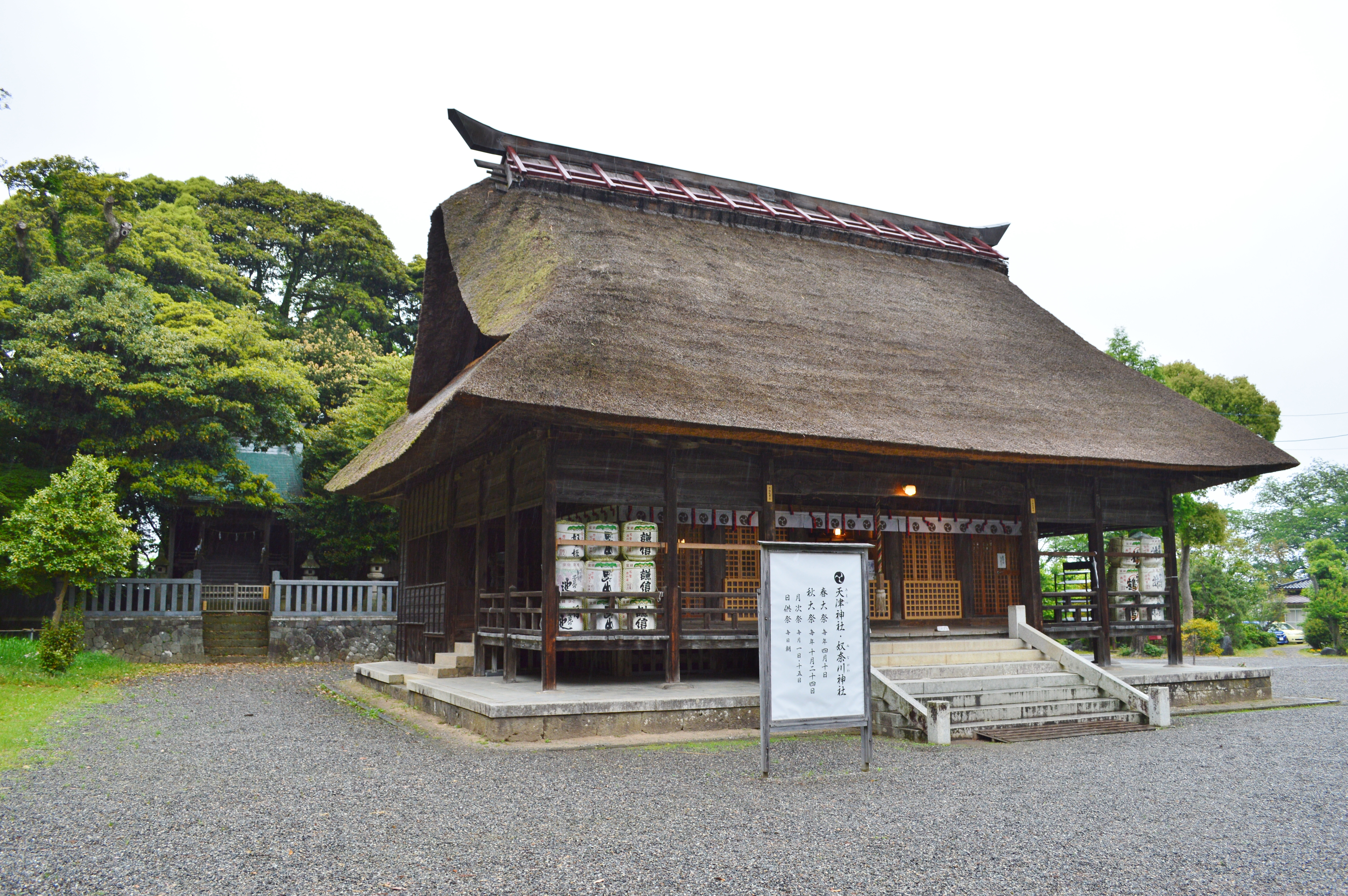
Haiden

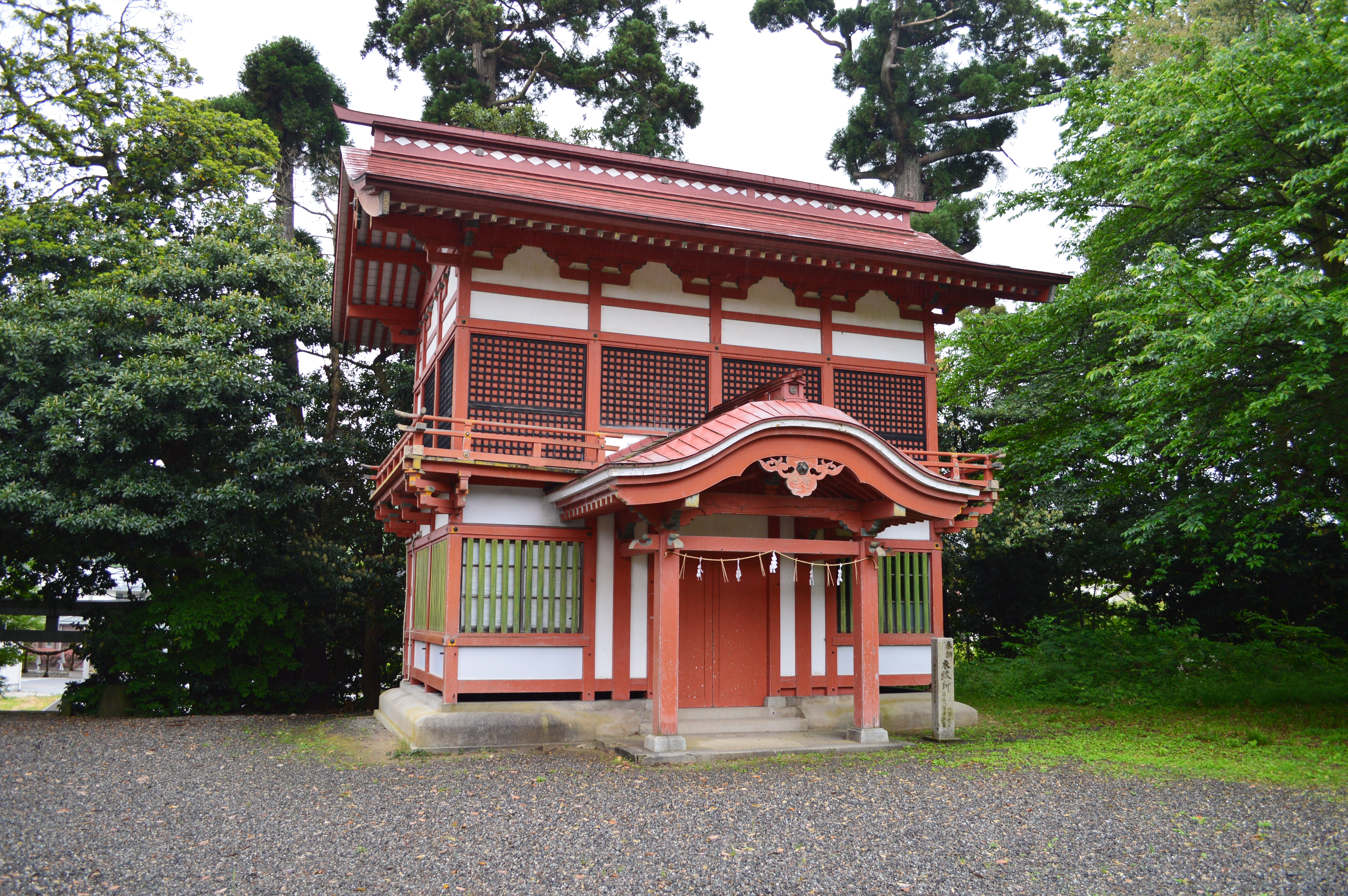
Emonjo

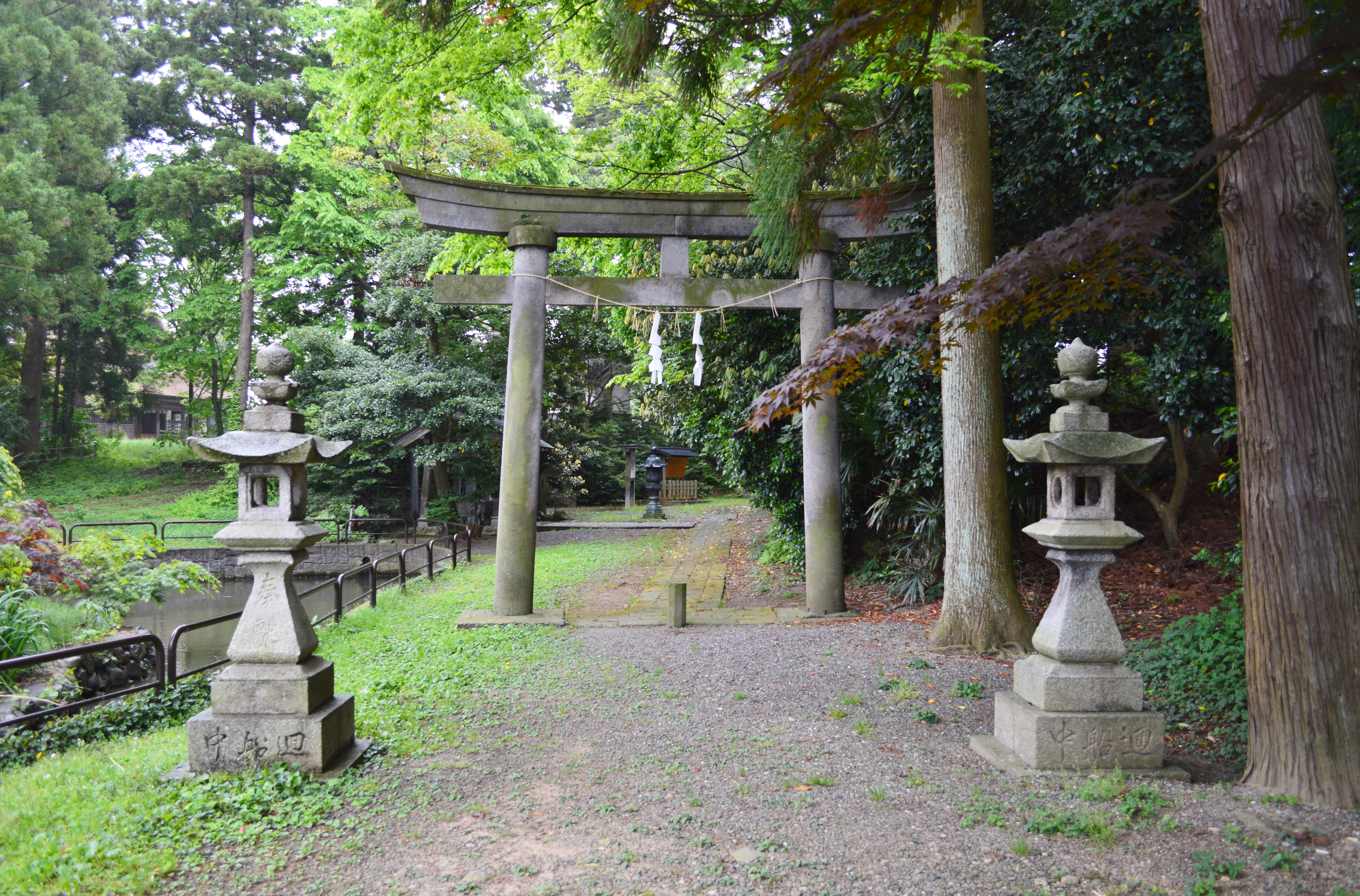
Torii

== Cultural Properties ==
=== National Intangible Cultural Folk Properties ===
- Amatsu Jinja Bugaku (天津神社舞楽); held during the shrine's annual festival on April 10–11.

=== Niigata Prefecture Designated Tangible Cultural Properties ===
- Wooden statue of Princess Nunakawa (木造奴奈川姫神像), late Heian period
- Bugaku Masks (舞楽面 3面), late Kamakura to late Muromachi period; set of 3
- Wooden statue of seated Shinto goddesses (木造女神坐像), late Heian to Kamakura period; set of 3

== See also ==
- List of Shinto shrines in Japan
- Ichinomiya
