= Nakatomi clan =

Ancient Japanese aristocratic clan group

Nakatomi 中臣
- Titles: Various
- Founder: Ame-no-Koyane
- Final ruler: Nakatomi no Itohito
- Founding year: Unknown
- Cadet branches: Fujiwara clan Ōnakatomi clan

Nakatomi clan (中臣氏, Nakatomi-uji) was a Japanese aristocratic kin group (uji). The clan claims descent from Ame-no-Koyane.

== History ==
The Nakatomi was an influential clan in Classical Japan. Along with the Inbe clan, the Nakatomi were one of the two clans that oversaw certain important national rites, and one of many to claim descent from divine clan ancestors "only a degree less sublime than the imperial ancestors". It is said that soon after the beginning of Jimmu's reign, a Master of Ceremonies (saishu) was appointed; and this office was commonly held by a member of the Nakatomi clan after the 8th century. This was due to the hereditary nature of both governmental positions and clan roles – a clan's role might be to supply warriors, or, in the case of the Nakatomi, to conduct Shinto rites and hold the associated positions. Though their material holdings were not the most extensive, their spiritual and ritual importance placed the Nakatomi and Imibe second only to the Imperial House during their heyday.

One particularly important ritual which the head of the Nakatomi clan oversaw was the Ōharai purification rite, performed twice every year, in which the High Priest (of the Nakatomi clan) asked the kami to cleanse the spirits of all of the people of their impurities.

=== Theories about their relationship with Takemikazuchi and the Ō clan ===
According to Iwao Ōwa in his Jinja to kodai ōken saishi (1989), Takemikazuchi was originally a local god (kunitsukami) revered by the Ō clan (多氏, Ō no uji; also written as 大氏), and was a god of maritime travel. However, the Nakatomi clan also has roots in this region, and when they took over control of priestly duties from the Ō clan, they claimed Takemikazuchi as the Nakatomi clan's ujigami (clan deity). Ōwa goes on to theorize that the Ō clan was originally ōmi (大忌, "greater taboo (priesthood)"), but was usurped by the Nakatomi who were among the "lesser priesthood" (the latter claims descent from the Inbe clan (忌部氏)).

The Nakatomi clan, essentially the priestly branch of the Fujiwara clan, also placed the veneration of Takemikazuchi in the Kasuga-taisha in Nara. (The thunder god is one of several gods enshrined.)

When the Yamato kingship expanded control into the easterly dominions, Kashima (Kashima, Ibaraki) became a crucial base. Yamato armies and generals often prayed to the Kashima and Katori deities for military success against the intransigents in the east. In these ways, Takemikazuchi became an important deity for the imperial dynasty.

== Asuka period ==
As a result of the Nakatomis' ritual position and role in the Asuka period, they were among the chief advocates of conservatism in the controversy over the introduction of Buddhism to Japan in the 6th century. However, by the time of Nakatomi no Kamatari, in the early 7th century, the clan had switched sides, possibly as a result of their loyalty and close connection to the Imperial family; following Prince Shōtoku, likely the most famous advocate of Buddhism in all of Japanese history, and later Prince Naka no Ōe, the Nakatomi helped eliminate the Soga clan, powerful and very active supporters of Buddhism, and of the current administration of the time (see Isshi Incident).

The clan soon came to be opposed by a number of other clans which vied for power and prestige at Court, and for influence over the Imperial succession. It is said however, that despite being overshadowed by others in terms of pure material wealth, the head of the Nakatomi clan was, in the mid-7th century, the most powerful man in Japan. Even into the 8th century, members of the Nakatomi clan maintained their important ritual position, becoming hereditary heads of the Jingi-kan (Department of Rites) established by the Code of Taihō in 701.

== Nakatomi clan after Fujiwara no Kamatari ==
Arguably the most well-known clan leader, Nakatomi no Kamatari was granted the name Fujiwara by Emperor Tenji as a reward for loyal service to the sovereign. Kamatari is honored as the founder of the Fujiwara clan, which accumulated extraordinary powers and prestige in the Heian period (794–1185).

Only the descendants of Fujiwara no Kamatari's eldest son Fuhito were allowed the name of Fujiwara. All the other members of the Nakatomi clan kept their original family name until Nakatomi no Imimaro was promoted to chūnagon with the support of Fuhito. In 764, Kiyomaro, the son of Imimaro, sided with Empress Kōken during the Fujiwara no Nakamaro Rebellion, and in 769, he was granted the name Ōnakatomi, thus establishing the Ōnakatomi clan. In the Heian period, all three legitimate houses of Nakatomi clan were granted the name Ōnakatomi. Nakatomi no Ichishi was the last jingihaku (Head of the Department of Worship) of the Nakatomi clan, and his son Itohito later took the name of Ōnakatomi, thus being the last member of the Nakatomi clan.

== Nakatomi family tree (大中臣系図) ==
Ikatsu ōmi-no-mikoto (雷大臣命)
 　┃
O-o-obase-no-mikoto (大小橋命)
 　┃
Nakatomi no Amahisa-no-kimi (中臣阿麻毘舎卿)
 　┃
Nakatomi no Abiko (中臣阿毘古)
 　┃
Nakatomi no Mahito (中臣真人)
 　┃
Nakatomi no Kamako (中臣鎌子)
 　┃
Nakatomi no Kuroda (中臣黒田)
 　┃
Nakatomi no Tokiwa (中臣常磐)
 　┃
Nakatomi no Katanoko (中臣可多能祜)
 　┣━━━━━━━━━━━━━━━━━━━━━━━━━━━━━━━━━━━━━━━━━━━━━━━━━━━━┳━━━━━━━━━━━━━━━━━━━━━━━━━━━━━━━━━━━━━━━━┓
Nakatomi no Mikeko (中臣御食子)      Nakatomi no Kuniko (中臣国子)      Nakatomi no Nukateko (中臣糠手子)
 　┃　　　　　　　　　　　　　　　　　　　　　　　　　　　 　┃　　　　　　　　　　　　　　　　　　　　　　┃
 　┃                               Second Branch of Nakatomi clan (中臣氏二門)       Third Branch of Nakatomi clan (中臣氏三門)
 　┣━━━━━━━━━━━━━━━━━━━━━━━━━━━━━━━━━━━━━━━━━━━━━━━━━┳━━━━━━━━━━━━━━━━━━━━━━━━━━━━━━━━━━┓
Fujiwara no Kamatari (藤原鎌足, 614–669)      Nakatomi no Hisata (中臣久多)      Nakatomi no Tareme (中臣垂目)
 　┃　　　　　　　　　　　　　　　　　　　　　　　　　　　　　　　　　　　　　　　　　　　 　 　┃
Fujiwara clan (藤原氏)                                                  First Branch of Nakatomi clan (中臣氏一門)

== See also ==
- Kogo Shūi — a record of the conflict between the Nakatomi and Inbe clans.
