= Inbe clan =

Japanese clan during the Yamato period

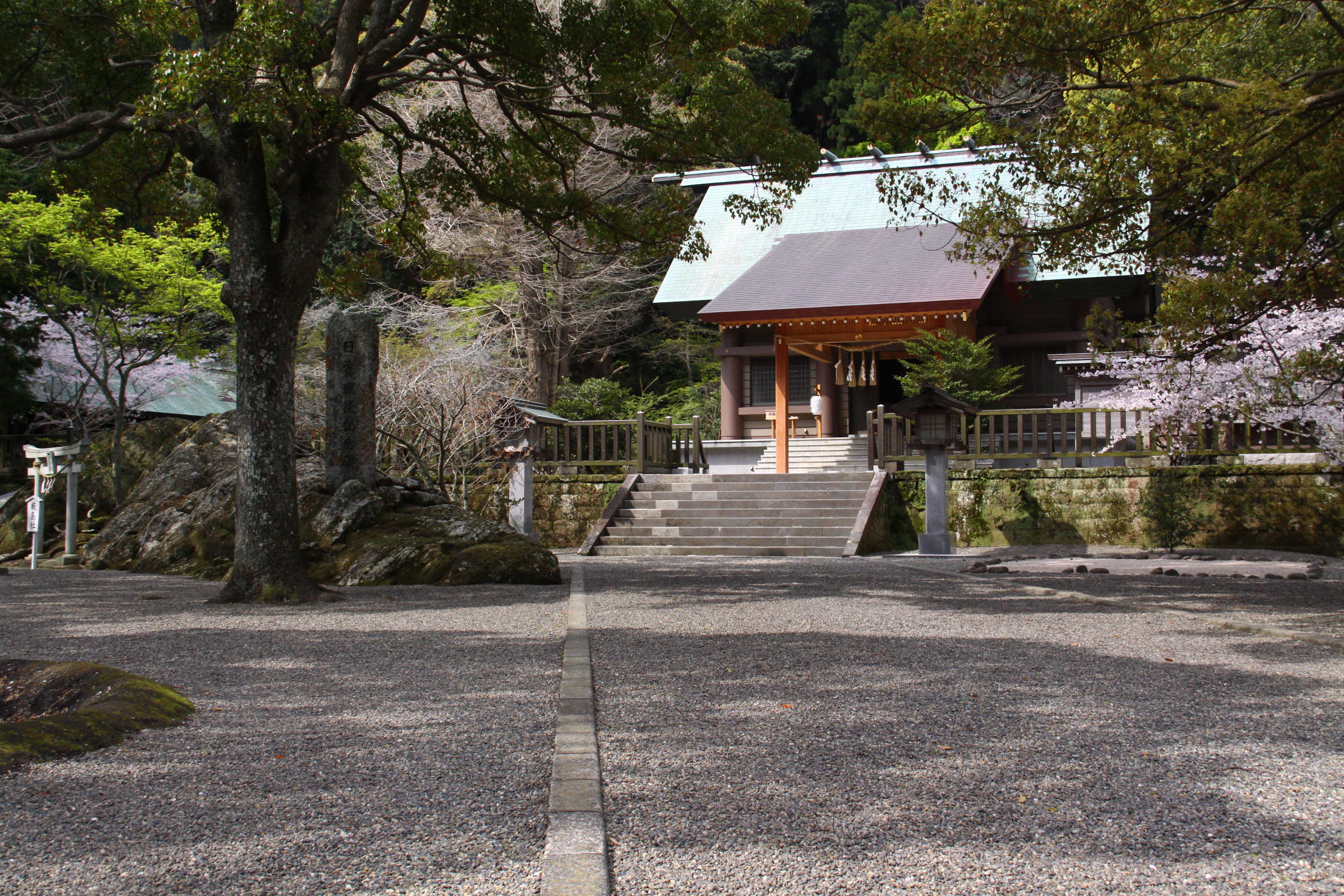
- Founder: Futodama

Inbe clan (忌部氏; also spelled Imibe clan or Inbe clan) was a Japanese clan during the Yamato period. They claimed descent from Futodama.

The Inbe clan originally had a religious function by preparing and taking care of offerings.

According to the Kogo Shūi the Inbe clan were given Awa Province in Shikoku so they could cultivate hemp there. This is where Inbe Shrine was built.

Their family shrines are Awa Shrine and Inbe Shrine.

== Overview ==
As the name of the clan "Imu" means "to abstain from Kegare", or "Saibai", the Imu clan was responsible for the rituals of the ancient Imperial Court, as well as for making ritual implements and building palaces. In the narrow sense, it refers to the Inbe family, the central family that led the Inbe clan, but in the broad sense, it includes the clans of the tribesmen who were led by the Inbe clan.

The main Inbe family claimed its ancestor was Amatatama-no-mikoto, who appeared in the Amano-Iwato myth of the Chronicles. It was based in the area around the present-day town of Inbe in Kashihara, Nara. They led the various clans in the region, and together with the Nakatomi clan, administered rituals for the Imperial Court since ancient times. In the Shukushi of the Enki-Shiki, it is written, "Let the Saibe clan's shukushi be used for the rituals of the palace and the gates, and let the Nakatomi clan's shukushi be used for all other rituals."

However, starting around the Nara period, the Nakatomi clan grew in power, and overwhelmed the Inbe position. In the early Heian period, the clan changed its name from Inbe to Saibe, and Saibe Hironari wrote the book Kogo Shūi. However, it never regained its momentum, and the position of ritual clan was occupied by the Nakatomi and Ohnakatomi clans.

The Inbe were divided into two groups: the Tomobe (public officials belonging to the imperial court) and the Kakibe (private citizens of the Inbe). Unlike the Saibes of the central clans, who had fewer and fewer achievements, the Inbe of the various regions included Izumo, who delivered jade, Kii, who delivered wood, Awa, who delivered cotton and linen, and Sanuki, who delivered shields. It is known from the literature that the people of these tribes later took the name of Inbe. These local clans left their traces everywhere.

== Origins ==
In the Kojiki and the Nihon Shoki, it is written that Amenotama-no-mikoto and Amenokoya-no-mikoto were involved in rituals in the myth of Amano-Iwato. Ame-no-Koyane were involved in the ritual relationship, and both deities were followed together in the Descent of the Sun. Both of these deities were in charge of the rituals of the Imperial Court at the time of the compilation of the Chronicles. This reflects the difference in power between the Nakatomi clan and the Inbe clan at the time of the compilation. On the contrary, the position is reversed in the Kogo Shūi of the Inbe clan.

The Kogo Shūi on the side of the Inbe clan reverses its position. As for the origin of Amata-tamamikoto, the Kogo Shūi says that he is the son of Takamimusubi no Kami, and the Shinsen Surname Records follows this, but the origin is not mentioned in the Kojiki or Nihonshoki, so the truth is not clear.

== History ==
The clan started off as low class but gained power due to religious reasons. During the reign of Emperor Kōtoku, the Inbe, along with the Nakatomi and Urabe clans, were tasked with supervising Jingikan. The clan lost its power during the reign of Emperor Shōmu. In the year 927 CE, members of the clan lost their long-standing right to present asa cloth for use in the imperial rituals.
