= Futodama =

Japanese deity

- God of Rituals, Oracle, Divination and Shimenawa
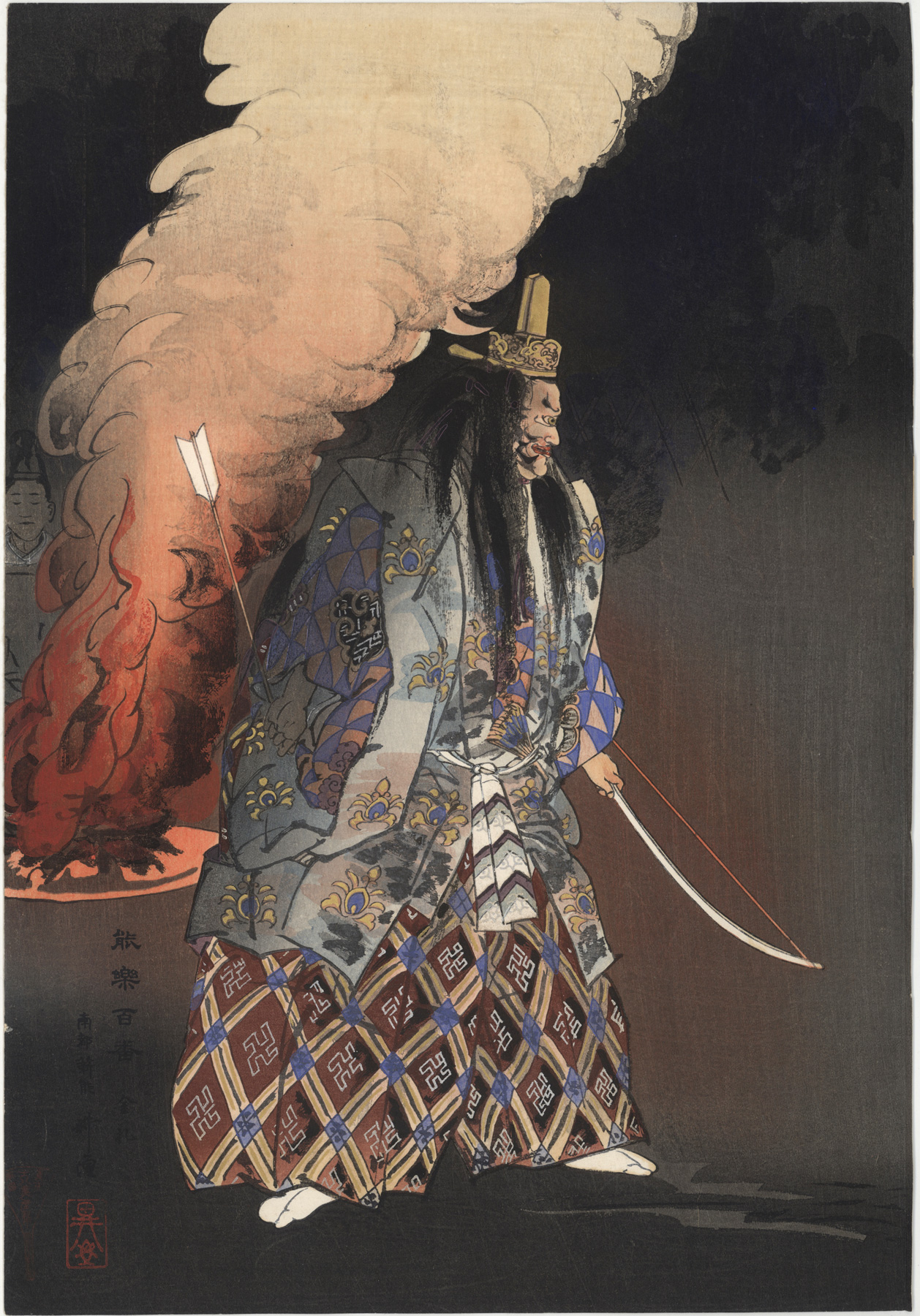

Genealogy
- Parents: Takamimusubi
- Siblings: Omoikane, Takuhadachiji-hime
- Children: Kamotaketsunumi no Mikoto

Equivalents
- Greek: Phoebe

Futodama (Japanese: 布刀玉命) or Futotama is a god in Japanese mythology, claimed to be the ancestor of Inbe clan, whose characteristics are believed to reflect the functions of the clan as court ritualists.

== Name and etymology ==

The god is known as Ame-no-Futodama-no-Mikoto (天太玉命) or Futodama (布刀玉, 太玉) for short. His name is speculated to mean great gift or offering.

== Myths ==
After Susanoo accidentally killed one of Amaterasu's attendants in her weaving hall, she got upset and locked herself in Ama-no-Iwato, causing the world to plunge into darkness. After almost a year of chaos, Omoikane and the other gods came up with a plan to get her out. Futodama and Ame-no-Koyane were tasked with performing a divination. After Amaterasu left the cave, Futodama used a shimenawa to prevent her from going back to the cave again. This story is said to be the mythical origin of shimenawa.

In the Kogo Shūi, Futodama is placed as the leader of the performed rituals.

== Family ==
Takamimusubi
Futodama
Inbe clan

Amaterasu
Takuhadachiji-hime	Oshihomimi
Ninigi-no-Mikoto

In the Kogo Shūi, Futodama is recorded as the son of Takamimusubi, and brother of Takuhadachiji-hime and Ame-no-Oshihi-no-Mikoto.

== Worship ==
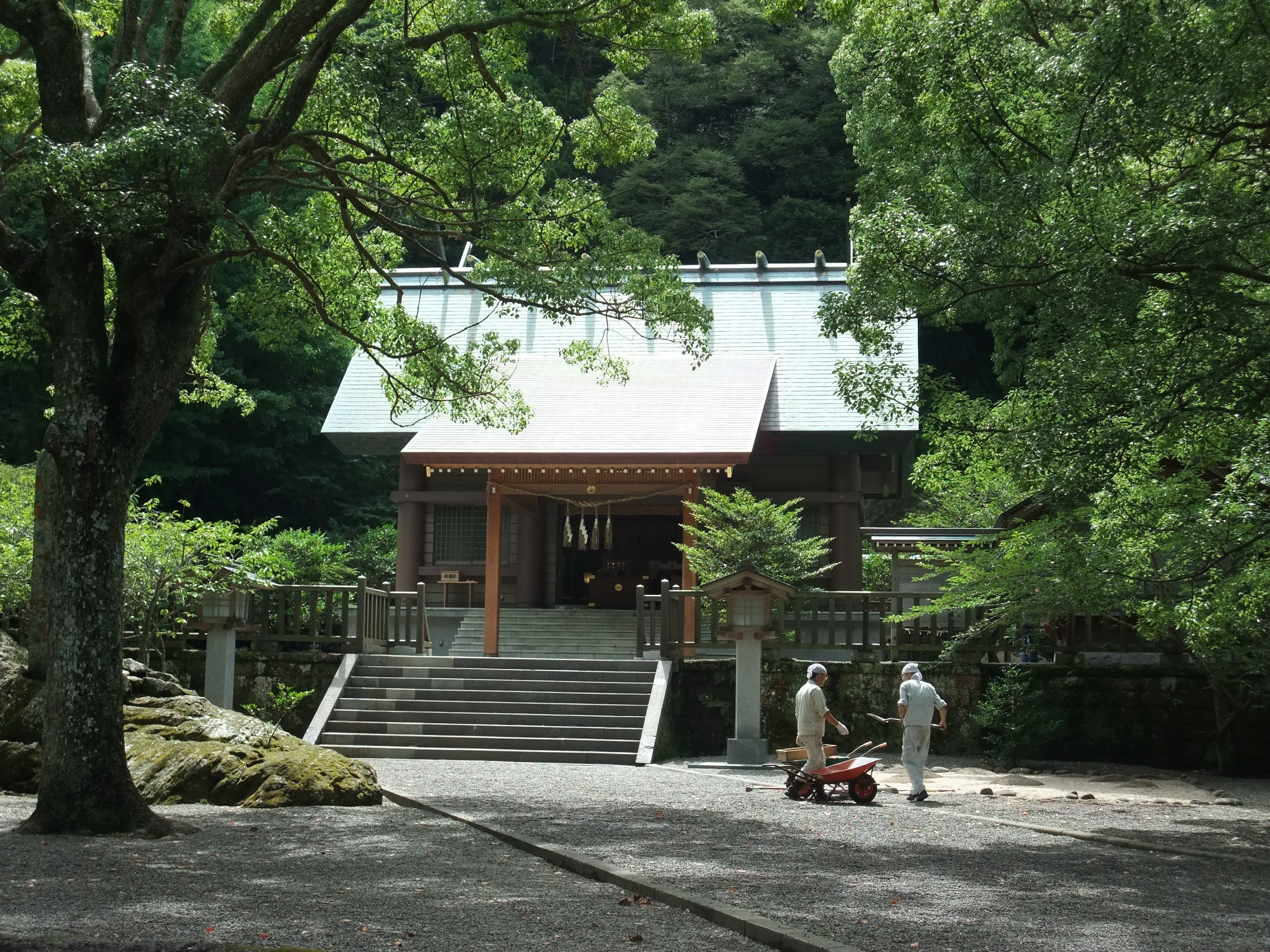

Futodama is believed to be enshrined at Awa shrine, where there is a festival to the kami every year on August 10. He is also enshrined at Amatsu Shrine alongside Ninigi and Ame-no-Koyane. The Engi Shiki lists several shrines to Futodama in Izumi Province.

== Popular culture ==
Futodama appears as a demon in the Japanese role playing game Shin Megami Tensei IV.
