= Kogo Shūi =

Historical record of the Inbe clan of Japan

Kogo Shūi (古語拾遺) is a historical record of the Inbe clan of Japan written in the early Heian period (794–1185). It was composed by Inbe no Hironari (斎部広成) in 807 using material transmitted orally over several generations of the Inbe clan.

== Background ==
Historically, both the Inbe and Nakatomi clans had long performed Shinto religious services for the Japanese imperial court. However, at the beginning of the Heian period, the Fujiwara clan, whom the Nakatomi clan are a branch of, seized political power. This strengthened the Nakatomi clan while weakening the Inbe clan and caused conflict between the two clans.

Hironari, whose date of birth and death are unknown, wrote this text to clarify the history and legitimize the rights of the Inbe clan as well as to argue the injustice of the Nakatomi clan and decline of the Inbe clan. He presented it to Emperor Heizei in 807.

== Contents ==
The text consists of three major sections:

1. The historical events of clan ancestor Amenofutodama no Mikoto and his grandson Amamito no Mikoto.
2. A description of the creation myth and the national history from Emperor Jinmu through Emperor Tenmu.
3. Eleven points of discontent with the Nakatomi clan and the decline of the Inbe clan.

The first two sections serve as evidence and reference for legitimatizing the third and main section.

== Value ==
The historical events described within the Kogo Shūi are nearly identical with those found in Kojiki and Nihon Shoki, the oldest written histories of Japan. However, there are several events unique to the text, so the Kogo Shūi serves as a valuable source of early Japanese history not found in the national histories.

Linguistically, the text contains a large number of old words written in man'yōgana which make it a valuable resource for studying Old Japanese.

== See also ==
- Japanese Historical Text Initiative
- Takahashi Ujibumi—the Takahashi clan records
