= Miyazu (disambiguation) =

Miyazu may refer to:

- Miyazu, Kyoto, a city in Japan
- Miyazu Domain, a feudal domain under the Tokugawa shogunate of Edo period Japan
- Miyazu Bay, a bay in the Sea of Japan
