= Kanmurijima =

Island in Kyoto, Japan

Kanmurijima Island
Native name: 冠島 Kanmurijima Nickname: Oshima or Yushima
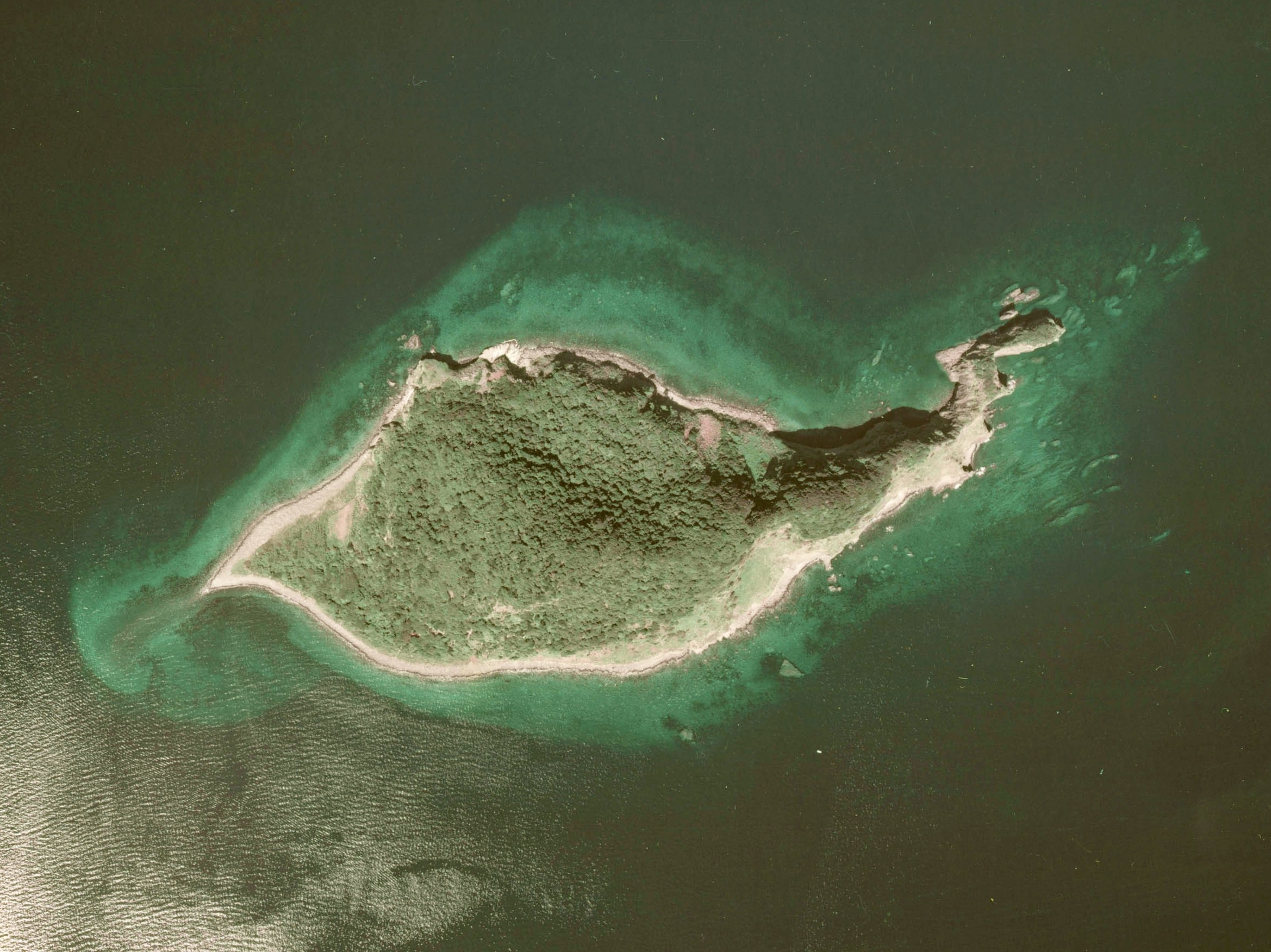
- Aerial photograph of Kanmurijima

- Location within Japan

Geography
- Location: Sea of Japan
- Coordinates: 35°40′50″N 135°25′35″E
- Archipelago: no
- Area: 0.223 km^{2} (0.086 sq mi)
- Length: 1.3 km (0.81 mi)
- Width: 0.5 km (0.31 mi)
- Coastline: 4 km (2.5 mi)
- Highest elevation: 169.7 m (556.8 ft)

Administration
- Japan
- Prefecture: Kyoto Prefecture
- City: Maizuru

Demographics
- Population: 0
- Ethnic groups: Japanese

Kanmurijima (冠島), also known as Oshima (冠島, O-shima) in the Oomoto religion, is an island in the Sea of Japan administered under Maizuru in Kyoto Prefecture. It is about 2 km from Kutsujima, a similar smaller island. Nakatsu reef (中津ぐり, Nakatsu-guri) is located just midway between islands. A breeding ground for streaked shearwaters, the island was designated a Japanese natural monument (天然記念物, tennen-kinenbutsu) in 1924. It has also been recognised as an Important Bird Area (IBA) by BirdLife International. Currently, the island is designated as Kanmurijima-Kutsujima wildlife protection area and any landing is prohibited. A recreational diving service is available though.

View of Ama-no-Hashidate by Sesshū Tōyō. On the right, torii of Kono Shrine is seen. On extreme right, Kammurijima and Kutsujima are also painted

== History ==
According to records of Tango no kuni fudoki, Kanmurijima and Kutsujima are the remains of a much larger island which submerged following an earthquake in 701 A.D. The topography of the seafloor seems to support the claim, as the steep 60-metre cliff is located underwater off the eastern coast of Kanmurijima and Kutsujima, indicating a recent crustal fault.

== Sacred site ==
Kanmurijima is a sacred pilgrimage site in the Oomoto religion. In Oomoto, the name of the island is pronounced differently as Oshima, although it is still written using the same kanji characters (冠島).

== See also ==
- Amanohashidate
- Kutsujima
- Desert island
- List of islands
