= Amenohoakari =

Japanese deity

Genealogy
- Parents: Ame-no-oshihomimi (father); Takuhadachiji-hime (mother)
- Children: Ame-no-Kaguyama-no-Mikoto

Amenohoakari (天火明) is a kami of sun and agriculture in Japanese mythology. The Shinsen Shōjiroku marks his descendants as descendants of kami (天孫族, tensonzoku).

== Name ==
Other names for Amenohoakari are listed below.

- Amaterukuniteruhikoamenohoakarikushitamanigihayahi-no-mikoto (天照国照彦天火明櫛玉饒速日尊) in the Kujiki
- Amaterukuniteruhikoamenohoakari-no-mikoto (天照國照彦天火明尊)
- Amaterukuniteruhikohoakari-no-mikoto (天照国照彦火明命) in the Nihon Shoki
- Amenohoakari-no-mikoto (天火明命) in the Kojiki
- Hoakari-no-mikoto (火明命) in the Nihon Shoki
- Ikishiniho-no-mikoto (膽杵磯丹杵穂命)
- Amateru Mitama-no-kami (天照御魂神) in Jinja Shiryō

== Genealogy ==
According to the Kojiki and volumes six and eight of the Nihon Shoki, Amenohoakari was born to Ame-no-oshihomimi and Takamimusubi's daughter, Takuhatachijihime, and lists that Ninigi-no-Mikoto is his younger brother. However, in volumes two, three, five, and seven of the Nihon Shoki, Ninigi-no-Mikoto is said to be his father.

The Kujiki treats Amenohoakari as an alternate name for Nigihayahi, the ancestral kami of the Hozumi and Mononobe clans, though this interpretation raises many questions in terms of genealogy and domain.

The Harima no Kuni Fudoki notes Amenohoakari as the child of Ōkuninushi and Notsuhime.

== Descendants ==
The Shinsen Shōjiroku list the descendants of Amenohoakari, in addition to the descendants of Amatsuhikone, Ame-no-hohi, and Amanomichine-no-Mikoto, as descendants of kami (天孫族, tensonzoku). The tensonzoku descended from the heavenly realm of Takamagahara to former Japanese provinces of Owari and Tanba, and are considered to be the divine ancestors of several clans including the Owari, Tsumori, Amabe, and Tanba clans. The Genealogy of the Amabe Clan (海部氏系図, Amabeshi Keizu) also notes Amenohoakari as the clan's ancestor.

Amenohoakari is also said to be the same kami as Nigihayahi, the ancestor of the Hozumi clan and Mononobe clan. However, there has been research which rejects conflating the two kami and insists it is a fabrication and absurd claim made only to link the two kami when it is said that Nigihayahi is Nigini-no-Mikoto's older brother. Additionally, the Shinsen Shōjiroku lists the descendants of Amenohoakari as descendants of kami (天孫族, tensonzoku) while Nigihayahi's descendants are kami of the heavens (天神, tenshin).

== Name meaning ==
As Amenohoakari's name suggests, he is the deification of sunlight and heat. Also, in the Kojiki-den, his alternative name of Hoakari is written differently (穂赤熟; ears of grain + red + ripen), meaning he warms grain so that it may ripen. Like other kami connected to the emperor, this name is connected to rice, leading to worship of him as a kami of the sun and agriculture.

While his name contains two characters in common with Amaterasu (天照), they are not the same kami. At Kono Shrine, the primary kami is Amenohoakari, while Amaterasu, enshrined in the same location, is considered another kami.

== Notable Shrines ==
- Kono Shrine - Enshrined as Hikohoakari-no-mikoto. A member of the Kaifu clan, said to be a descendant of Amenohoakari, has long inherited the position of head priest.
- Masumida Shrine
- Osada Nimasu Amateru Mitami Shrine - Sakurai, Nara Prefecture
- Sumiyoshi-taisha - Descendants of the Owari clan, said to be descendants of Amenohoakari, historically inherited the position of head priest.
- Owaribe Shrine - Nagoya, Aichi Prefecture
- Tanabata Shrine
- Various Amateru Mitama Shrines across Japan

== See also ==
- Jimmu's Eastern Expedition
