= Amanohashidate =

Scenery in Japan

Coordinates: 35°34′09.69″N 135°11′29.46″E

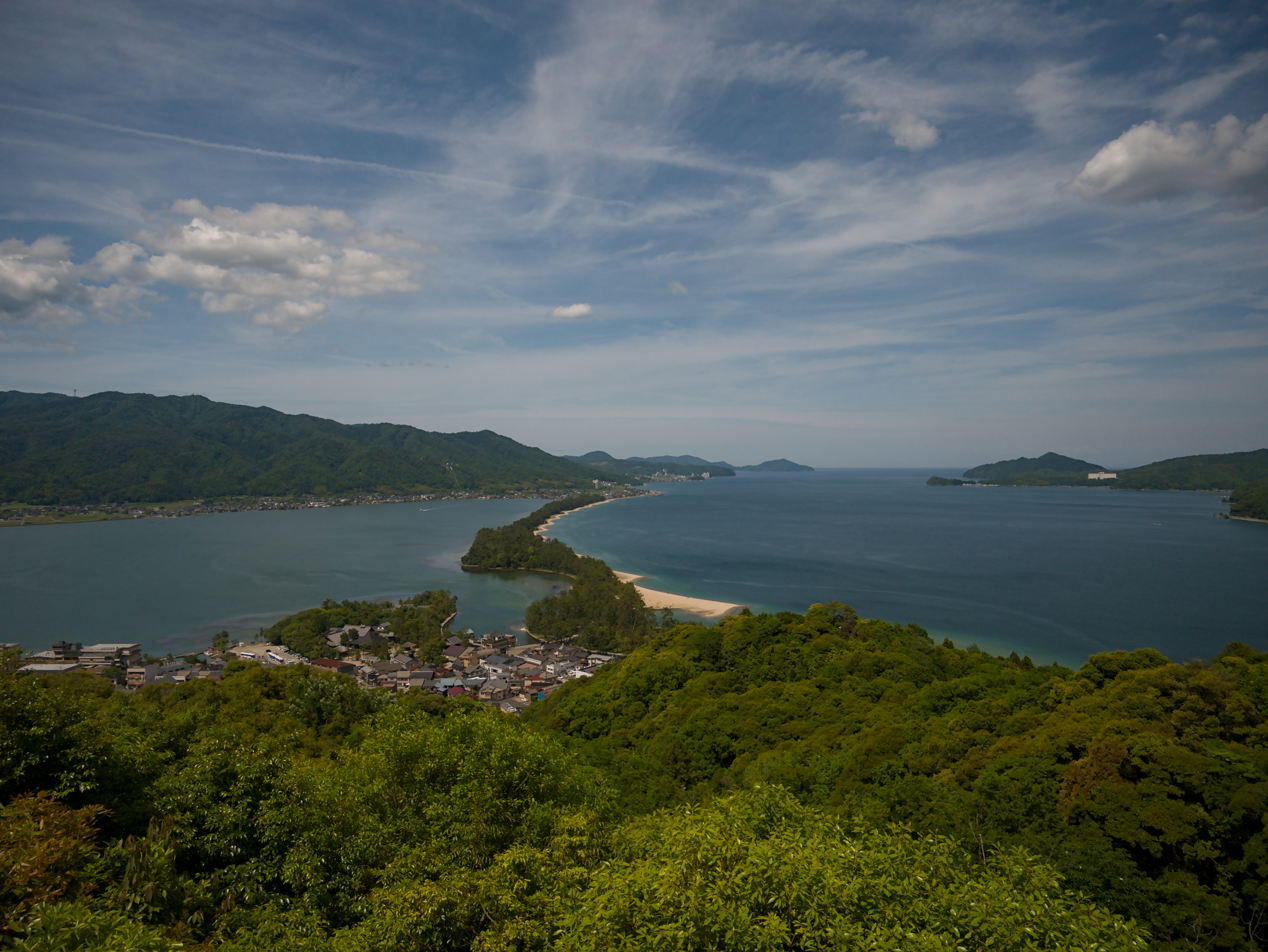
An aerial view of Amanohashidate in 2026

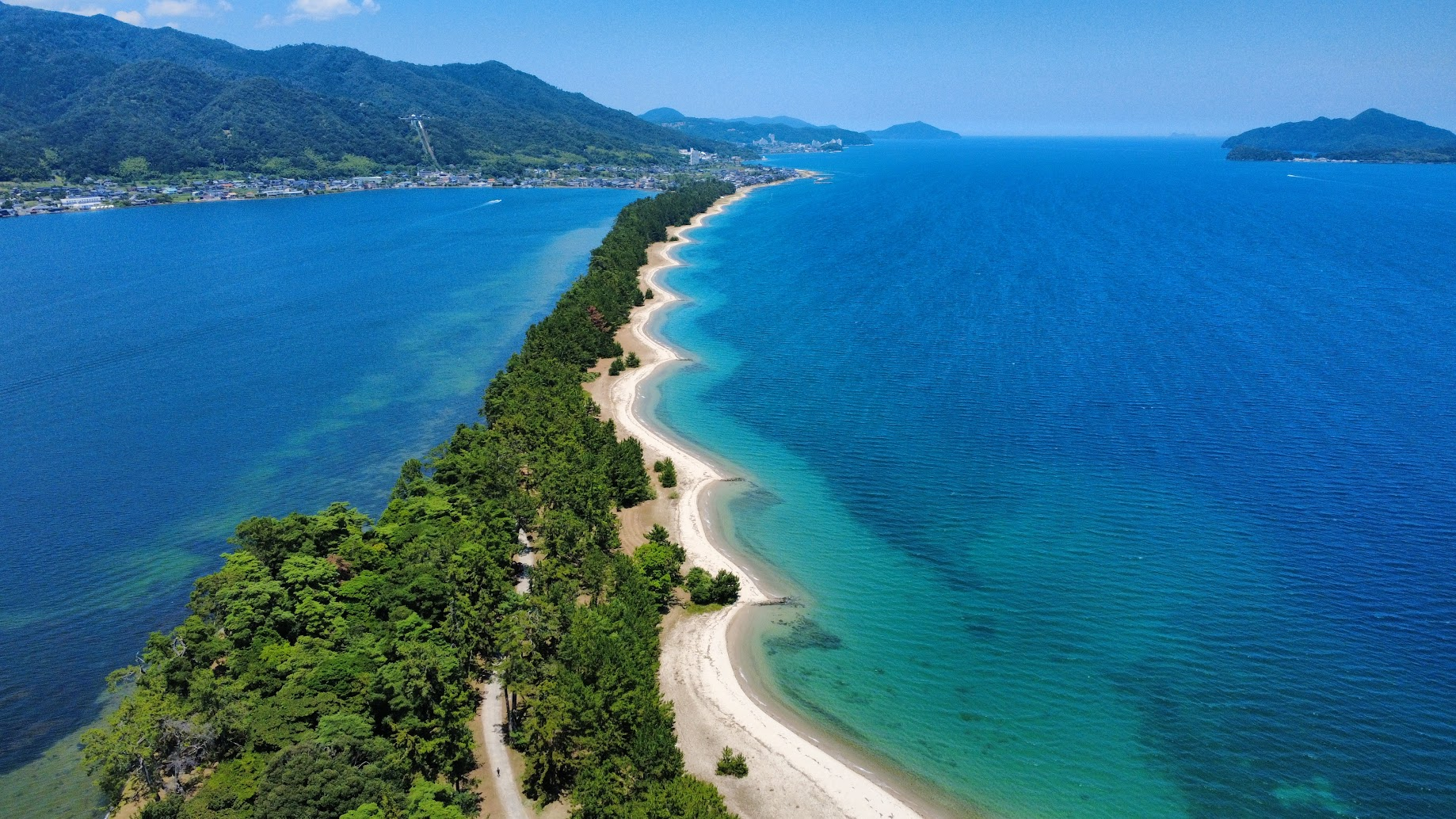
Amanohashidate view

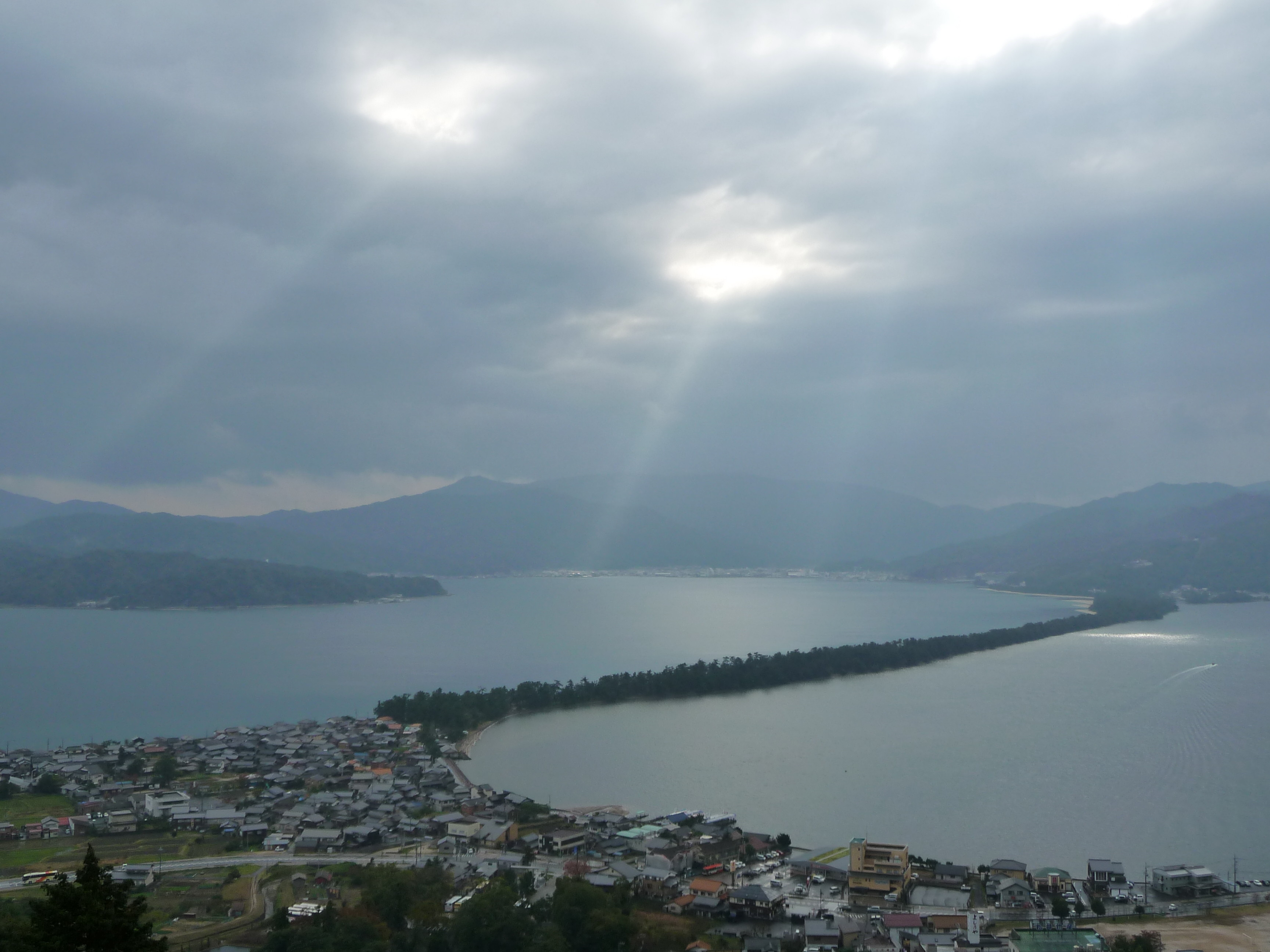
Amanohashidate view from a terrace near Kasamatsu Station

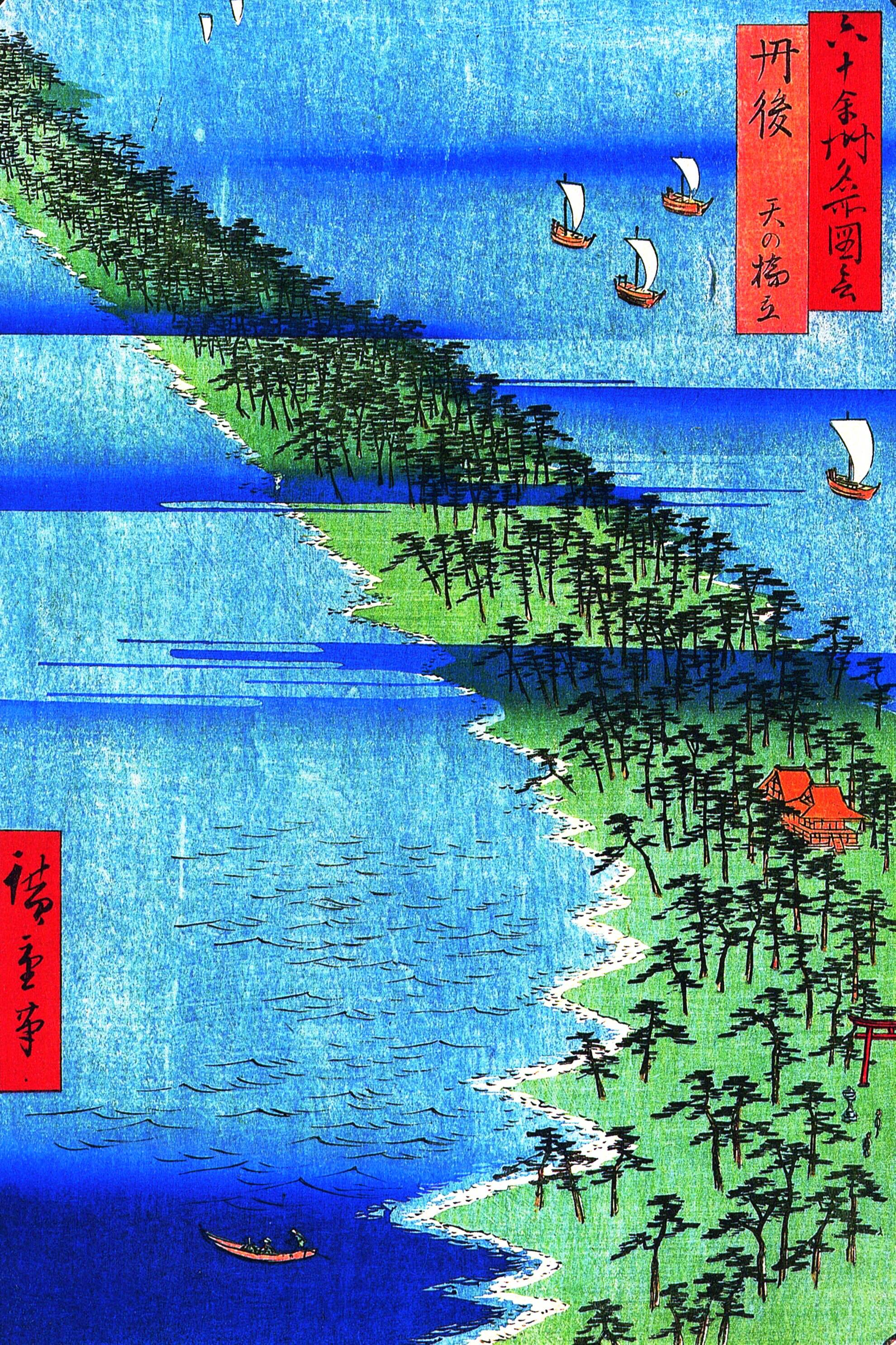
Amanohashidate in an ukiyo-e by Hiroshige

"View of Ama-no-Hashidate" by Sesshū Tōyō On the right, torii of Kono Shrine is seen. And on extreme right, Kanmurijima and Kutsujima are also painted.

Amanohashidate (天橋立; Japanese pronunciation: [aꜜ.ma no (|) ha.ɕi.da.te]) is one of Japan's three scenic views. It is a sandbar located in Miyazu Bay in northern Kyoto Prefecture. It forms part of the Tango-Amanohashidate-Ōeyama Quasi-National Park.

== Location ==
A thin strip of land connects two opposing sides of Miyazu Bay. This sand bar is 3.3 km (2.1 mi) long and covered with about 7,000 pine trees.

It can be viewed from mountains on either side of the bay or it can be traversed on foot. Near the northern end is Kono Shrine, a Shinto Shrine, and the southern end is Chion-ji, a Buddhist temple.

On the bar is the Isoshimizu fresh water well cherished since the Heian period, which was selected as one of 100 best springs and rivers in Japan by the Environmental Agency in 1985.

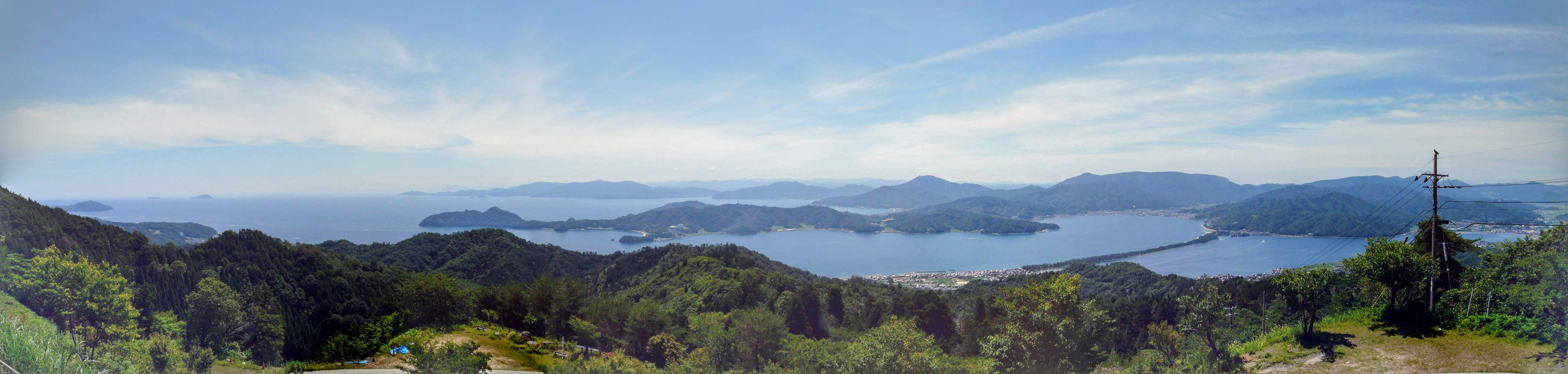
Miyazu Bay and Amanohashidate view from Nariai-ji Temple Observatory

== Access ==
Amanohashidate Station on the Miyazu Line railway, about two hours from Kyoto Station or Osaka Station, is located within walking distance from the southern end of Amanohashidate.

== Unique placename kanji ==
In Japanese, Amanohashidate is typically spelled as "天橋立" (literally "bridge standing towards heaven"). However, this location is notable for having at least four locally created placename kanji, "𲔁", "", "𳅃", and "". These kanji are known for their unusually high number of strokes.

After many years of difficulty using these characters in computers, two of these kanji, "𲔁" and "𳅃", were encoded in Unicode as part of CJK Unified Ideographs Extension J in September of 2025. As of Unicode 17.0, and are not yet encoded in the Unicode standard.

== See also ==
- List of Special Places of Scenic Beauty, Special Historic Sites and Special Natural Monuments
- The 100 Views of Nature in Kansai
