= Masumida Shrine =

Shinto shrine in Ichinomiya, Aichi prefecture, Japan

Masumida Shrine 真清田神社
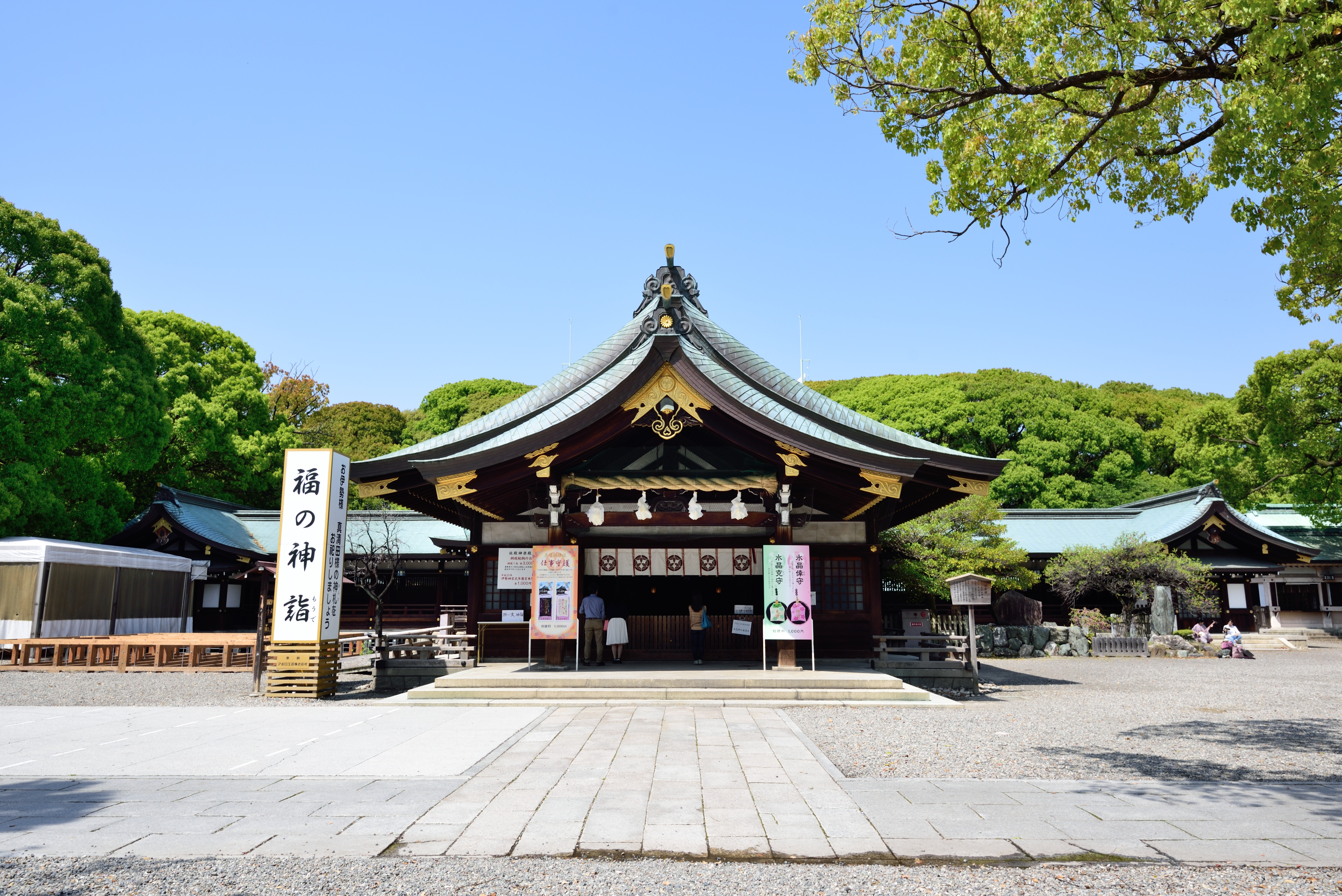
- Haiden of Masumida Shrine

- Location within Aichi Prefecture Location within Japan

Religion
- Affiliation: Shinto
- Deity: Amenohoakari
- Festival: April 3

Location
- Location: 2-1 Masumida 1-chōme, Ichinomiya, Aichi 491-0043
- Interactive map of Masumida Shrine 真清田神社
- Coordinates: 35°18′27″N 136°48′07″E

Architecture
- Established: unknown

Website
- Official website

Masumida Shrine (真清田神社, Masumida Jinja) is a Shinto shrine in the Masumida neighborhood of the city of Ichinomiya in Aichi Prefecture, Japan. It is the ichinomiya of former Owari Province. The main festival of the shrine is held annually on April 3.

== Enshrined kami ==
The kami enshrined at Masumida Jinja is:

- Amenoho no Akari no mikoto (天火明命), kami of the sun and agriculture, the younger brother (or father) of Ninigi, and the ancestor of the Owari clan, the prehistoric rulers of the area.

== History ==
The date of Masumida Shrine's foundation is unknown. Shrine tradition and the Kujiki records give the unlikely date of 628 BC, or the third day of the third month of the 33rd year in the reign of Emperor Jimmu, when the spirit of Amenohoakari was brought to Owari from the Mount Katsuragi in Yamato Province. Another tradition gives the date of foundation to the reign of the semi-legendary Emperor Suinin (97 BC – 30 BC). The shrine is located near the site of the provincial capital of Owari Province, established in the Nara period and features in the Yamato Takeru myth cycle. During the early Heian period, it appears in the Rikkokushi and in the Engishiki records. It has been styled as the ichinomiya of Owari Province since at least the end of the Heian period.

In 1584, after the shrine was damaged by an earthquake, it was rebuilt by Toyotomi Hideyoshi. It was subsequently supported by the Tokugawa shogunate and Owari Domain until the end of the Edo period. After the Meiji restoration, the shrine was given the rank of National shrine, 3rd rank (国幣小社, Kokuhei shosha) in the Modern system of ranked Shinto shrines in 1885. It was promoted a National shrine, 2nd rank (国幣中社, Kokuheii chusha) in 1914. The shrine was destroyed in the Ichinomiya air raid of 1945 and was not rebuilt until 1951, with reconstruction taking ten years.

The shrine is located ten-minutes on foot from either Owari-Ichinomiya Station on the JR Central Tōkaidō Main Line or Meitetsu Ichinomiya Station on the Kintetsu Railway Nagoya Main Line

== Gallery ==
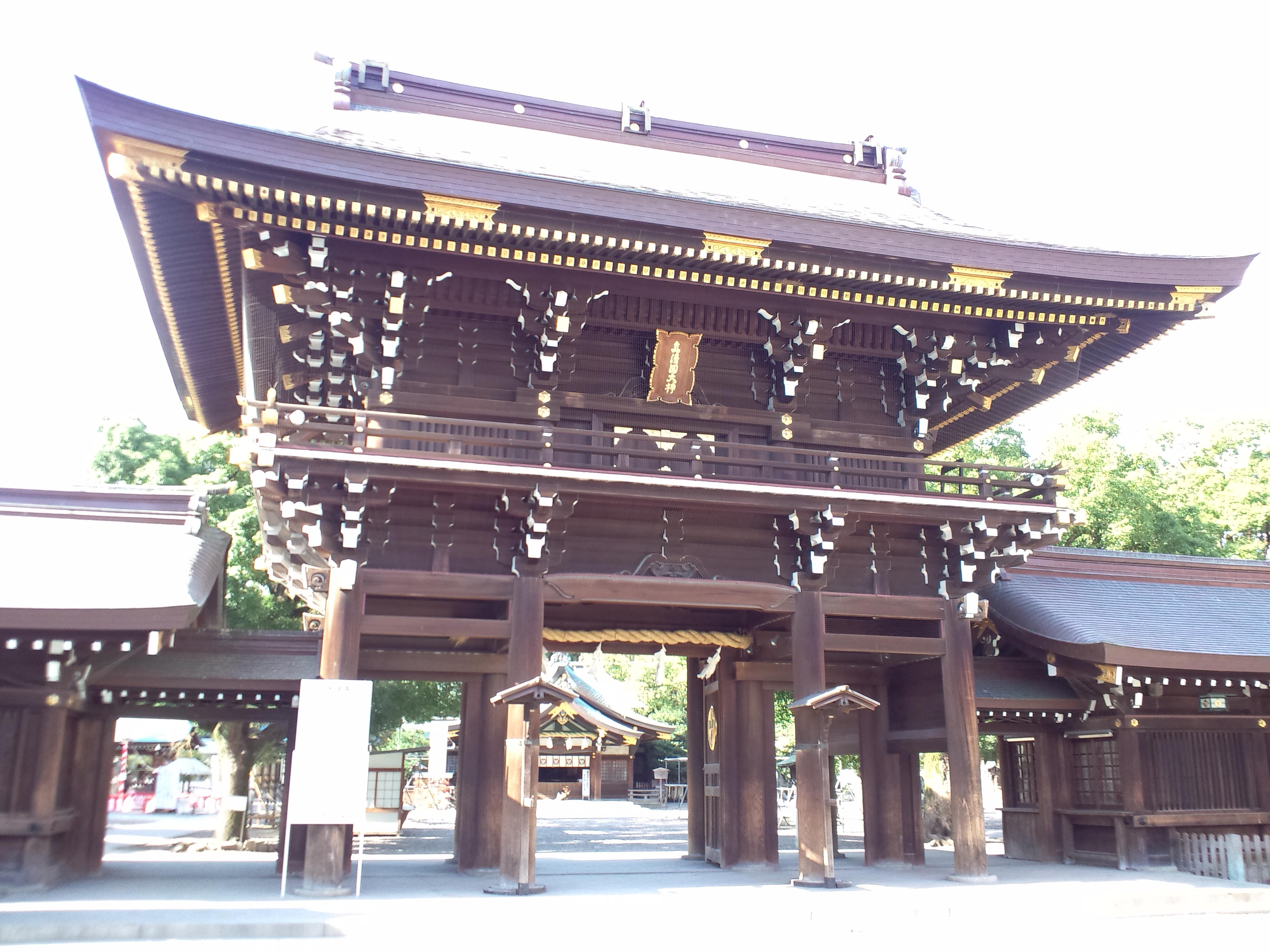
Rōmon

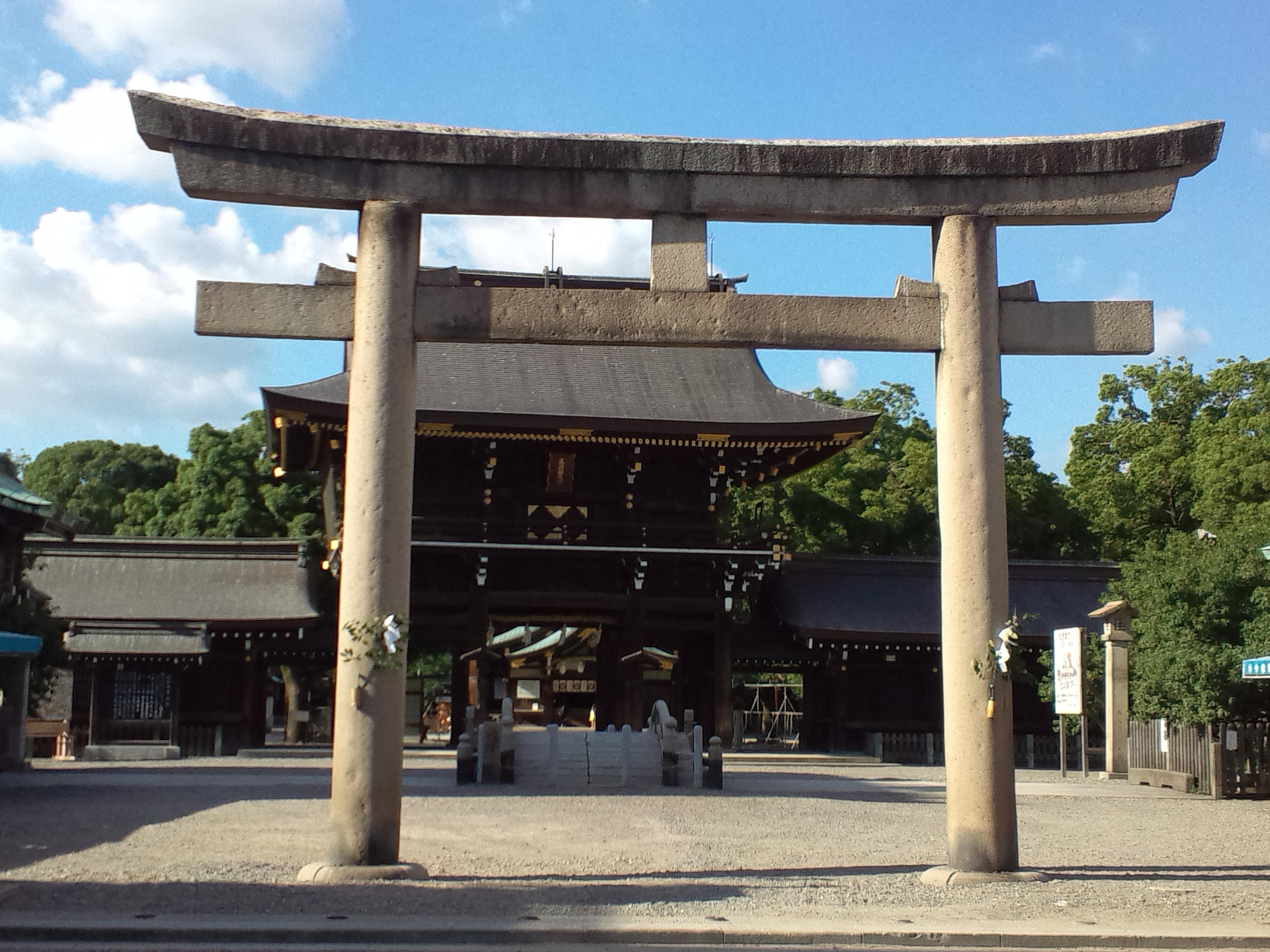
Torii and Rōmon

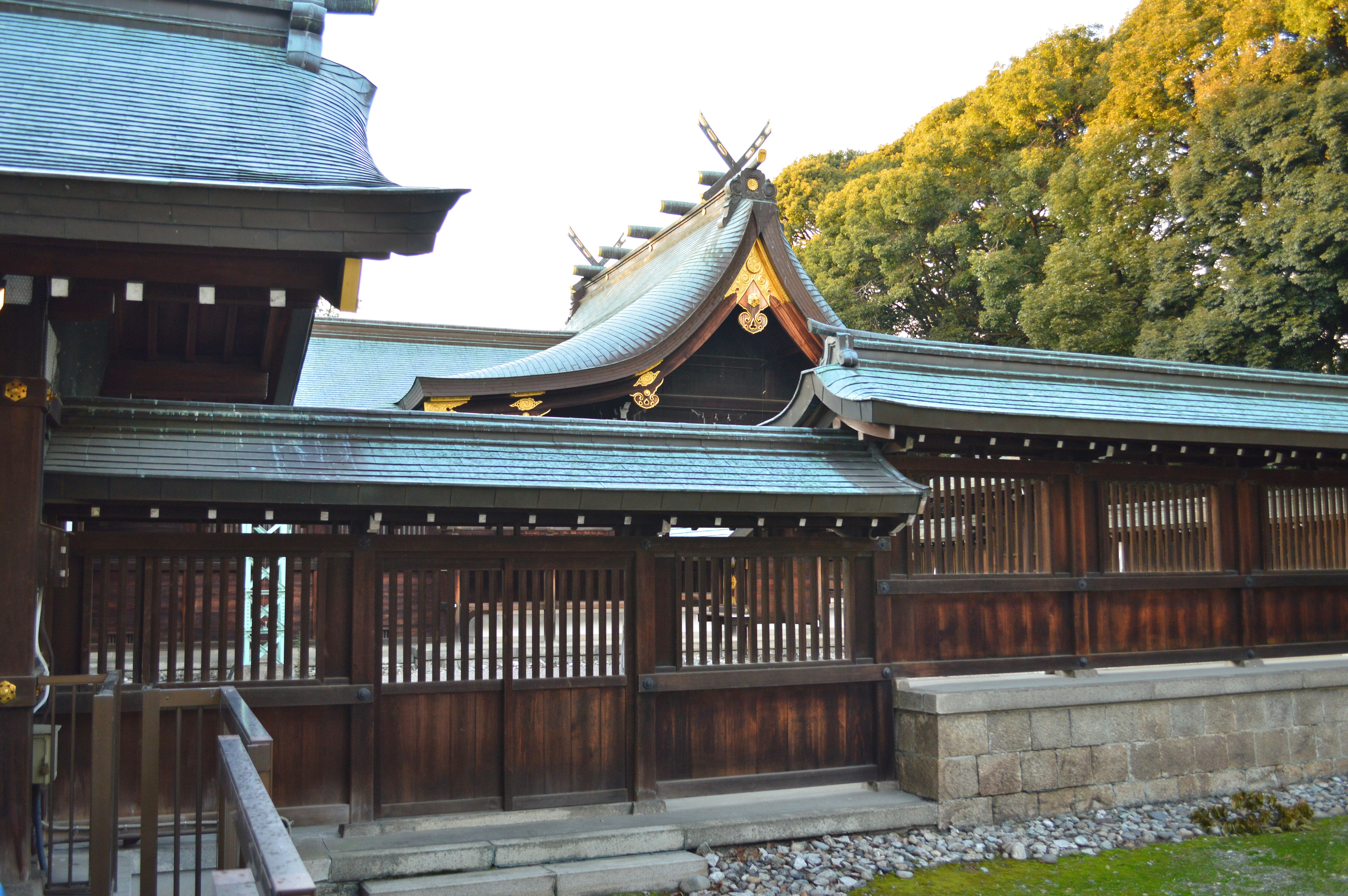
Honden

== Cultural properties ==
=== Important Cultural Properties ===
- Bugaku masks (木造舞楽面, Mokuzō bugaku-men), set of 12, ten from the Kamakura period, two from the Muromachi period, donation from Juntoku Tenno
- Red Lacquerware (朱漆角切盤/朱漆入角盤/朱漆擎子 附(銅鋺/銅皿)), Muromachi period; set of 25 items, including lacquer trays, saucers and bowls, dated 1457

=== Registered Tangible Cultural Properties ===
- Honden and connecting building (真清田神社本殿及び渡殿, Masumida jinja honden oyobi watadono) Showa period (1954);
- North Gate and Wall (真清田神社北門及び透塀, Masumida jinja kitamon oyobi Tōru hei) Showa period (1954)
- Ceremonial Libraryl (真清田神社祭文殿; Masumida jinja saimonden) SHowa period (1956)

== See also ==
- List of Shinto shrines
- Ichinomiya
