= Kutsujima, Kyoto =

Island in Kyoto, Japan

Kutsujima Island
Native name: 沓島 Kutsujima Nickname: Kojima
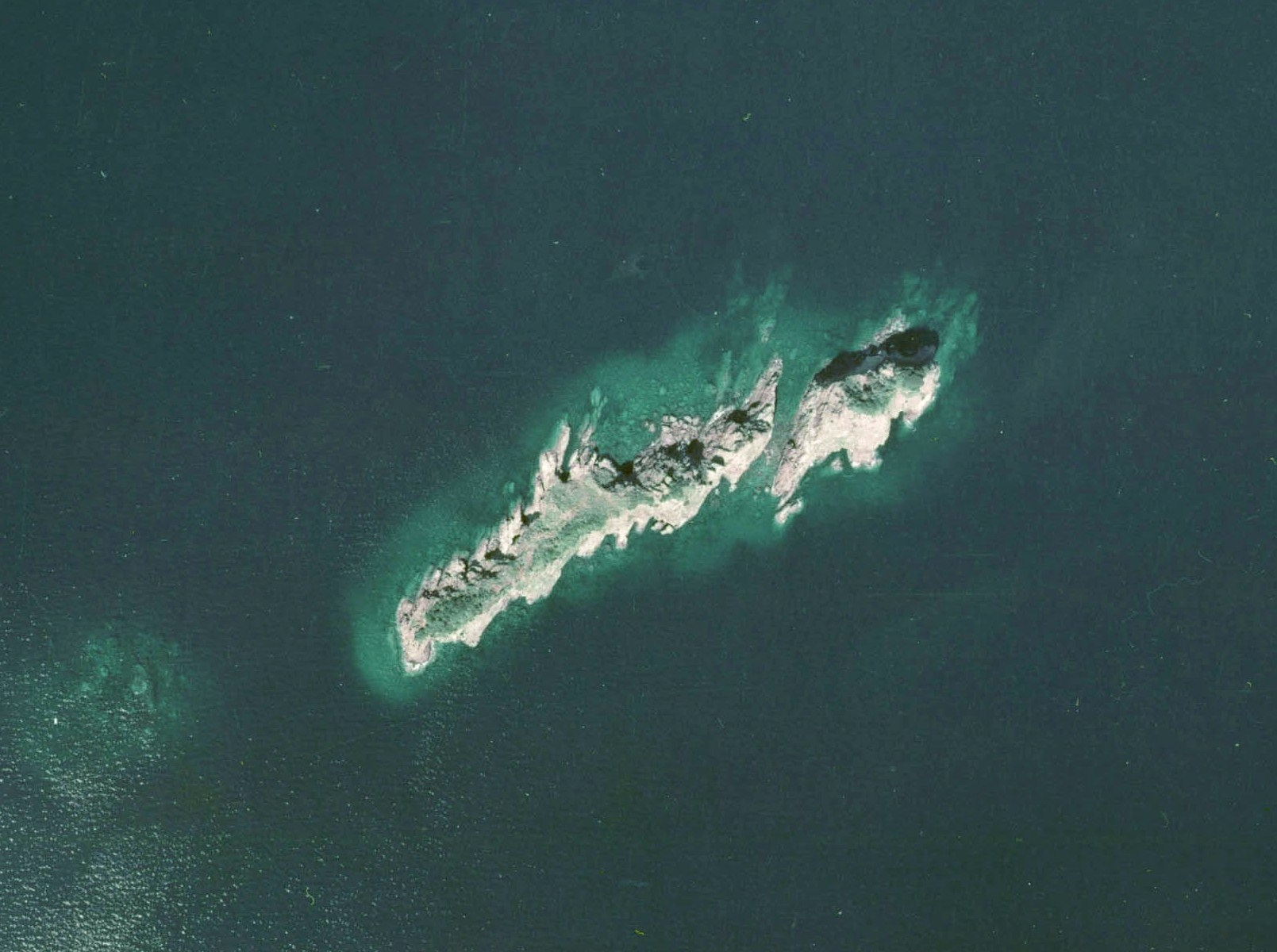

- Location within Japan

Geography
- Location: Sea of Japan
- Coordinates: 35°42′40″N 135°26′16″E
- Archipelago: yes
- Total islands: 2
- Major islands: 2
- Area: 0.0097 km^{2} (0.0037 sq mi)
- Length: 0.6 km (0.37 mi)
- Width: 0.05 km (0.031 mi)
- Highest elevation: 89 m (292 ft)
- Highest point: Bell Rock

Administration
- Japan
- Prefecture: Kyoto Prefecture
- City: Maizuru

Demographics
- Population: 0
- Ethnic groups: Japanese

Kutsujima (沓島, Kutsu-jima), also known as Meshima (沓島, Me-shima) in the Oomoto religion, is a volcanic island in the Sea of Japan, 2.5 km from the coast of the Kyoto Prefecture in Japan. Kutsujima Island is administered as part of Maizuru city. The island consist of two islets - the smaller northern (where highest elevation rocks are located) is Tsurigane-jima (釣鐘島) or Meshima (女島) and larger southern is Bōshima (棒島) or Kojima (小島) Kutsujima has been recognised as an Important Bird Area (IBA) by BirdLife International because it supports populations of black-tailed gulls, Japanese murrelets and Swinhoe's storm petrels. Currently, the islets are designated as the Kanmurijima-Kutsujima Wildlife Protection Area, and any landing is prohibited.

View of Ama-no-Hashidate by Sesshū Tōyō On extreme right, Kutsujima with Kanmurijima are also painted.

== History ==
According to inscriptions on Tango no kuni fudoki, the Kanmurijima and Kutsujima are the remains of the much larger island which submerged following an earthquake in 701 A.D. The topography of seafloor seems to support the claim, as the steep 60-meter cliff is located underwater off eastern coast of Kanmurijima and Kutsujuma, indicating a recent crustal fault. The northern islet is inaccessible without rock-climbing equipment, and was the famous hermits prayer location during the late 19th century.

== Sacred site ==
In the Oomoto religion, Kutsujima is considered sacred to the kami Ushitora no Konjin (艮の金神).

Kutsujima is a sacred pilgrimage site in the Oomoto religion. In Oomoto, the name of the island is pronounced differently as Meshima, although it is still written using the same kanji characters (沓島).

== See also ==
- This article incorporates material from Japanese Wikipedia page 沓島, accessed 5 January 2017
- Kanmurijima
- Desert island
- List of islands
