= Kono Shrine =

Shinto shrine in Kyoto Prefecture, Japan

Kono Jinja 籠神社
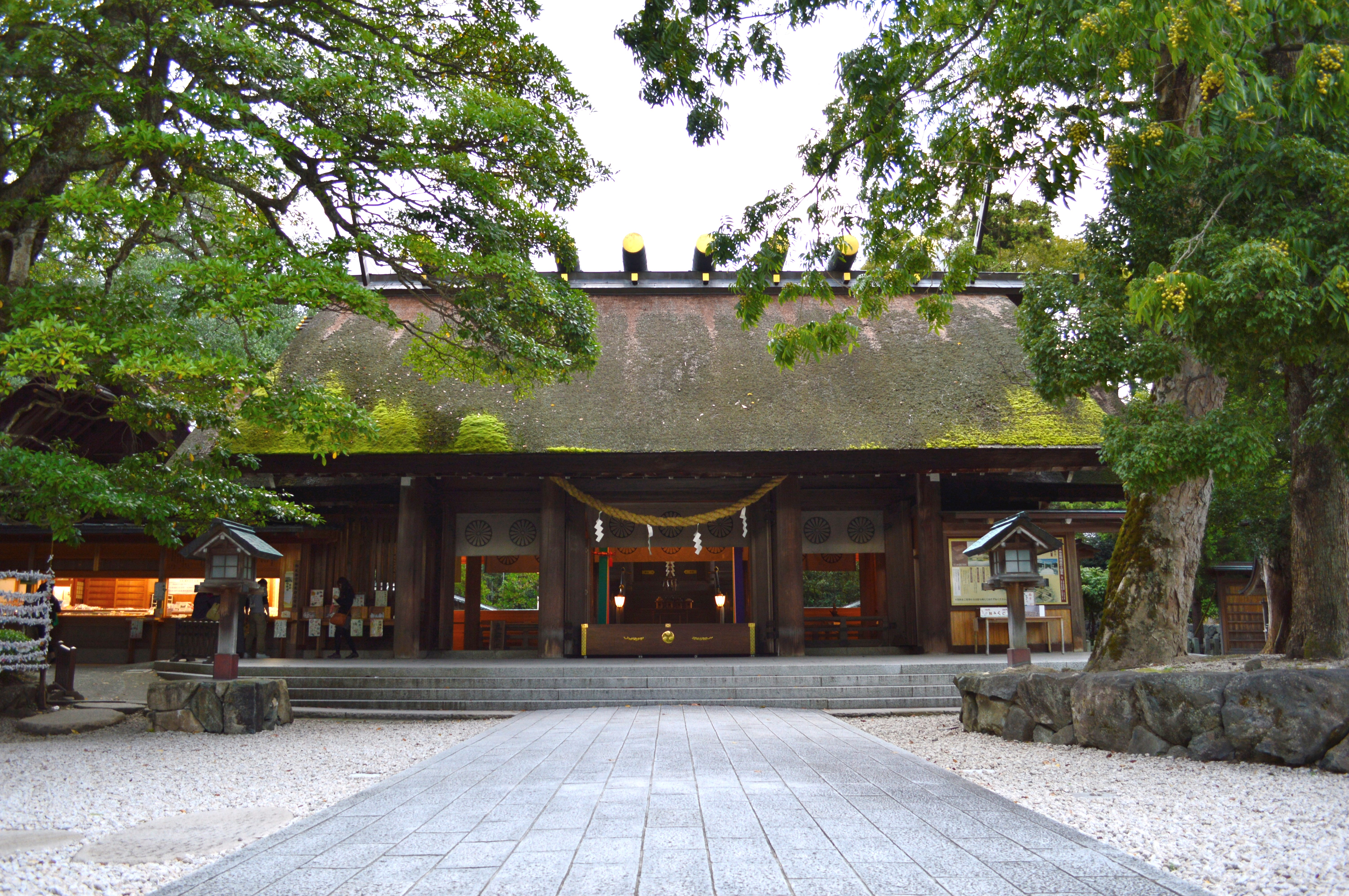
- Haiden of Kono Jinja

- Location within Kyoto Prefecture Location within Japan

Religion
- Affiliation: Shinto
- Deity: Amenohoakari
- Festival: April 24

Location
- Location: 430 Ōgaki, Miyazu-shi, Kyoto-fu 629-2242
- Interactive map of Kono Jinja 籠神社
- Coordinates: 35°34′58.13″N 135°11′48.01″E

Architecture
- Style: Shinmei-zukuri
- National Treasure of Japan

Website
- Official website

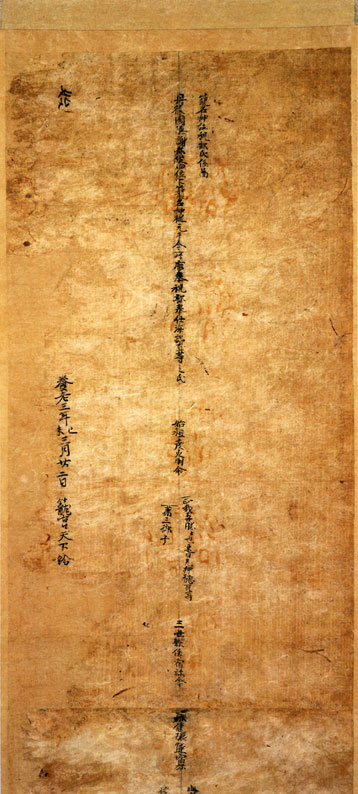
Amabe clan genealogy

Kono Jinja (籠神社) is a Shinto shrine in the Ōgaki neighborhood of the city of Miyazu in Kyoto Prefecture, Japan. It is the ichinomiya of former Tango Province. The main festival of the shrine is held annually on April 24. The shrine is also called the Moto-Ise Kono Jinja (元伊勢籠神社), and its kannushi has been in the Amabe clan since the Kofun period.

It may be the Sōja shrine and Ichinomiya of the Tango Province.

== Enshrined kami ==
The primary kami enshrined at Kono Jinja is:

- Amenohoakari (彦火明命), god of the sun and agriculture

The secondary kami are:

- Toyoukebime (豊受大神), goddess of agriculture and industry
- Amaterasu (天照大神), goddess of the sun
- Watatsumi (海神), water deity
- Mikumari-no-Kami (天水分神)

== History ==
According to the legend of this shrine, Toyouke-Ōmikami was originally enshrined that this location before being relocated to the Outer Shrine of the Ise Grand Shrine during the reign of Emperor Yūryaku to offer sacred food to Amaterasu Ōmikami, the Sun Goddess. The shrine was originally called the Manai Jinja (真名井神社), but was renamed in 671 by the 26th generation kannushi to "Kagomiya" or "Kago Jinja" based on the tradition that the god of worship appeared in the snow in a basket. The main kami enshrined was changed to Amenohoakari in 719 by the 27th generation kannushi, but Toyouke-Ōmikami retained as a secondary object of worship. The shrine and its rituals are described in both the Kojiki and the Nihon Shoki. The shrine is listed in the Engishiki records from the early Heian period, as a Myōjin Taisha (名神大社) and the ichinomiya of the province. It was located immediately to the west of the site of the Tango provincial capital.

The shrine consists of an upper and lower portion. The lower shrine is the Honden and is a Shinmei-zukuri structure with a cypress bark roof. It was rebuilt in 1845 and is designated as a Tangible Cultural Property of Kyoto Prefecture

During the Meiji period era of State Shinto, the shrine was designated as a National shrine, 2nd rank (国幣中社, kokuhei-chūsha) under the Modern system of ranked Shinto Shrines

The shrine is located next to the Ama-no-Hashidate.

== Cultural Properties ==
=== NationalTreasures ===
- Amabe clan genealogy (海部氏系図), early Heian period, it is considered the oldest family tree in Japan.The clan claims descent from Amenohoakari, and served as at the kuni no miyatsuko of Tanba Province before it was divided into Tamba and Tango.The document records 82 generations of descent from Amenohoakari. It was designated a National Treasure in 1972.

=== National Important Cultural Properties ===
- Biane (扁額), wooden, Heian period, inscribed "Kago no Daimyōjin", dated 976.
- Komainu (狛犬), stone, Momoyama period.
- Excavated Items from Kono Jinja Kyozuka (丹後国府中籠神社経塚出土品), Heian period, consisting of two copper cylinders, one mirror with a design of chrysanthemum, and mirror with a line drawing of a Buddha, dated 1188

== Gallery ==
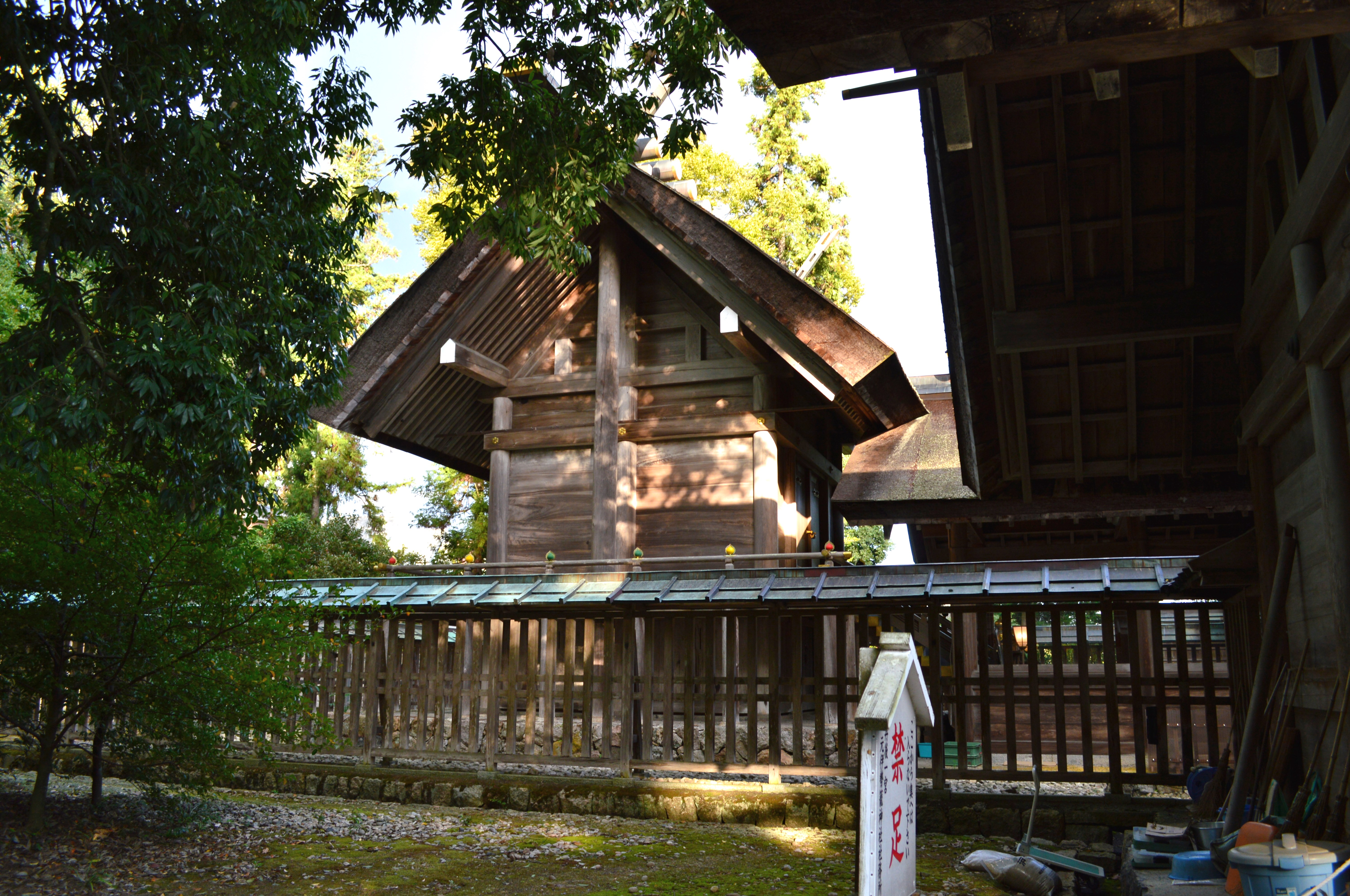
Honden（Kyoto Prefectural ICP）

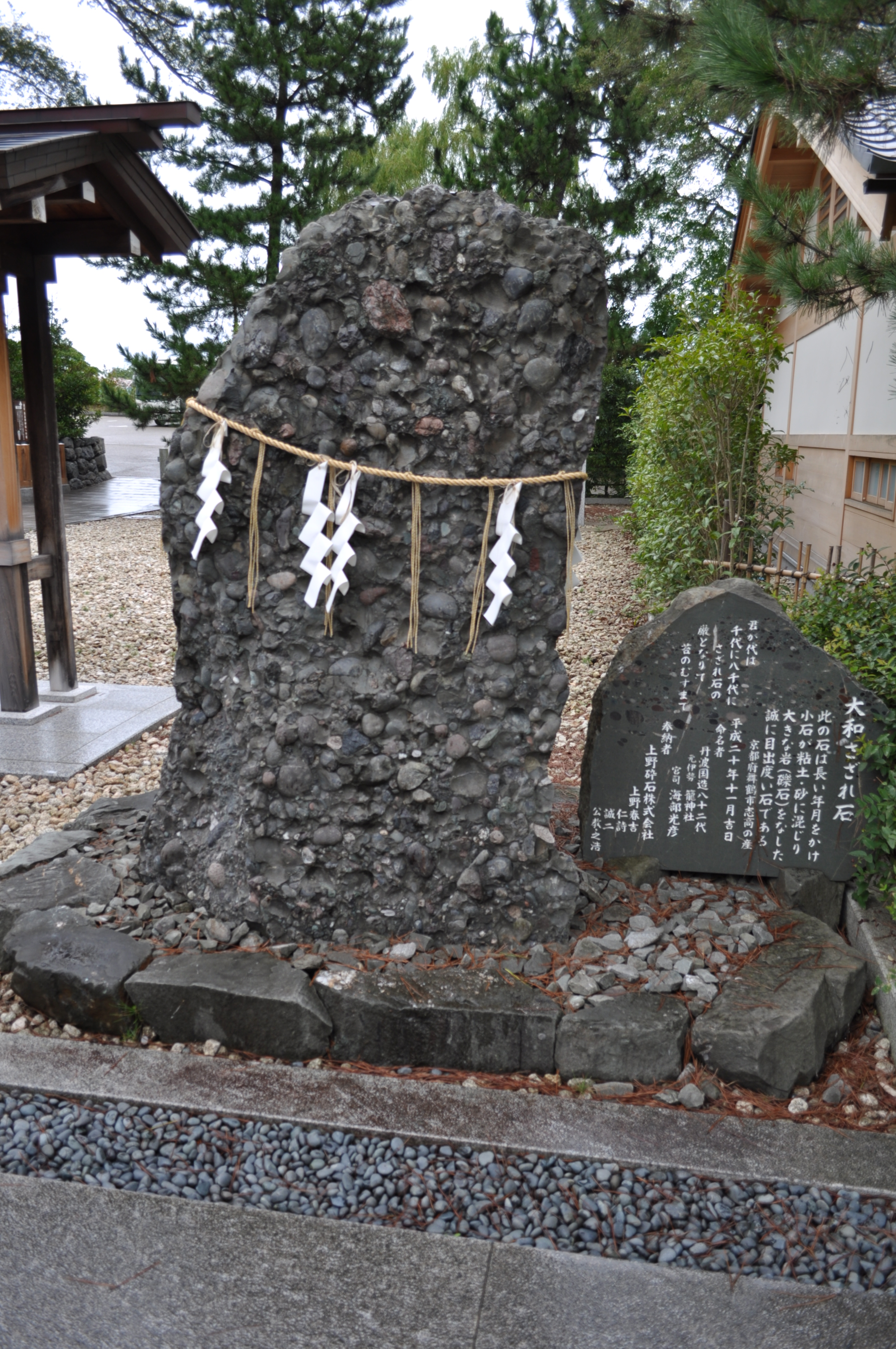
Yamato Sazare-ishi

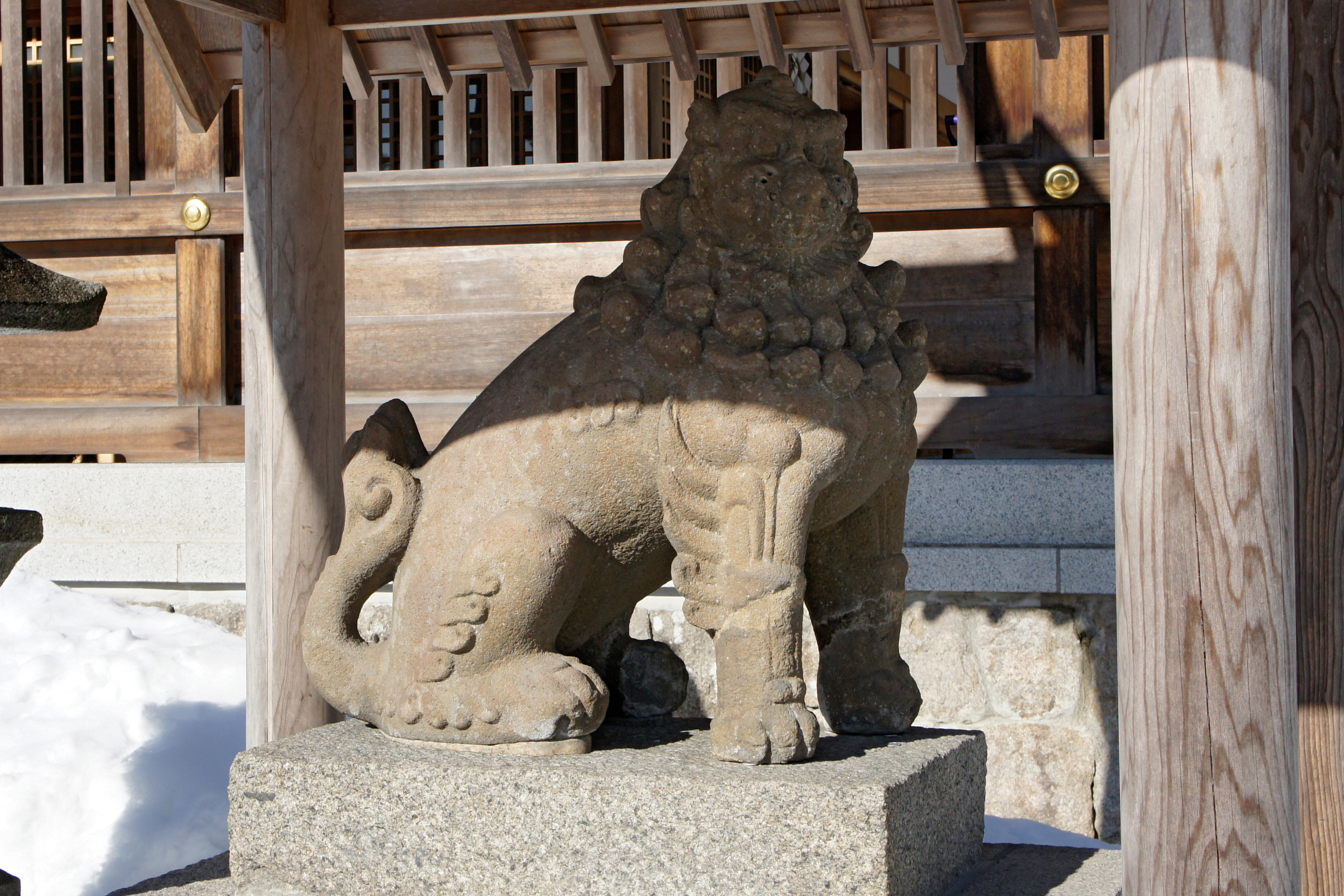
Koma-inu（ICP）

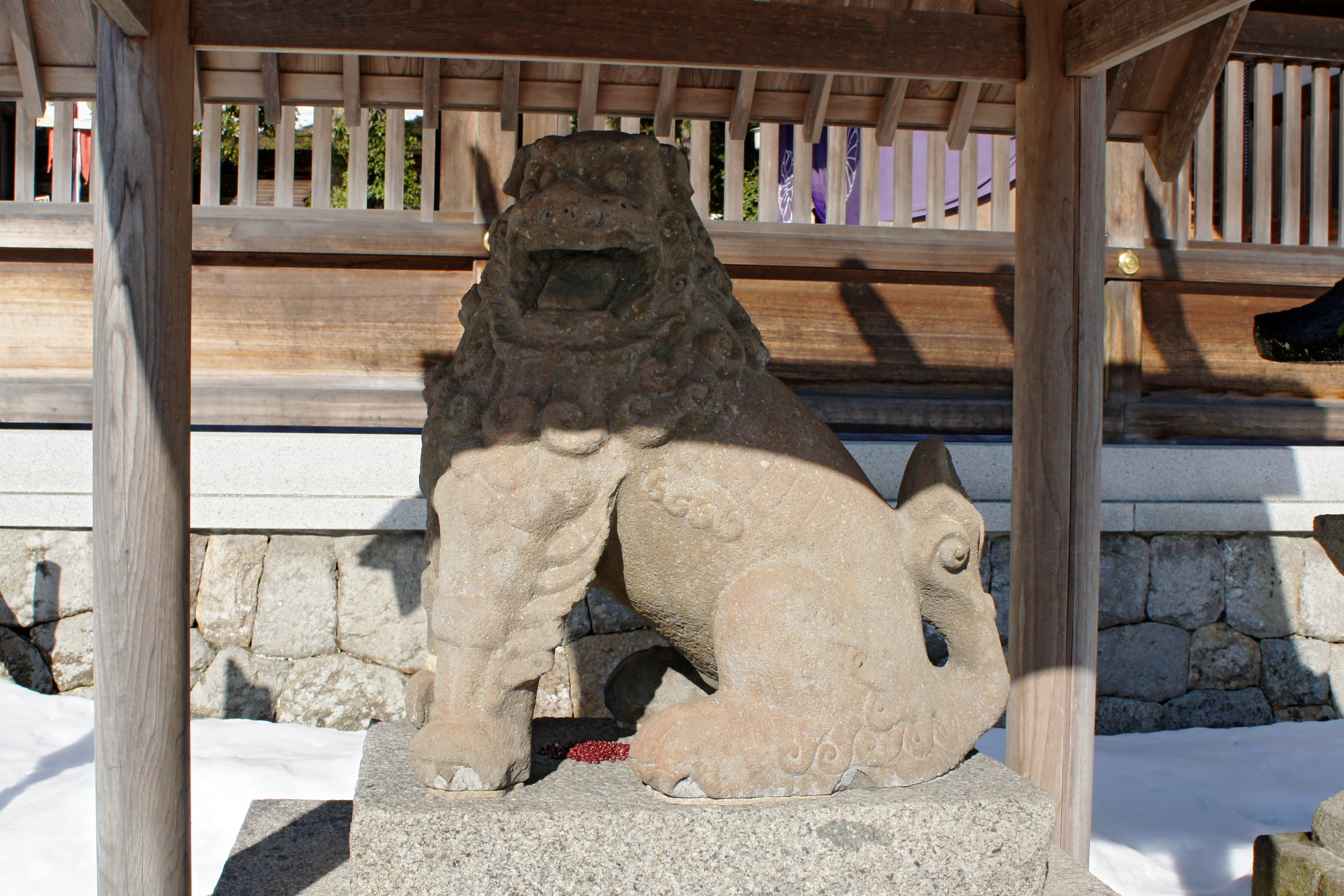
Koma-inu（ICP）

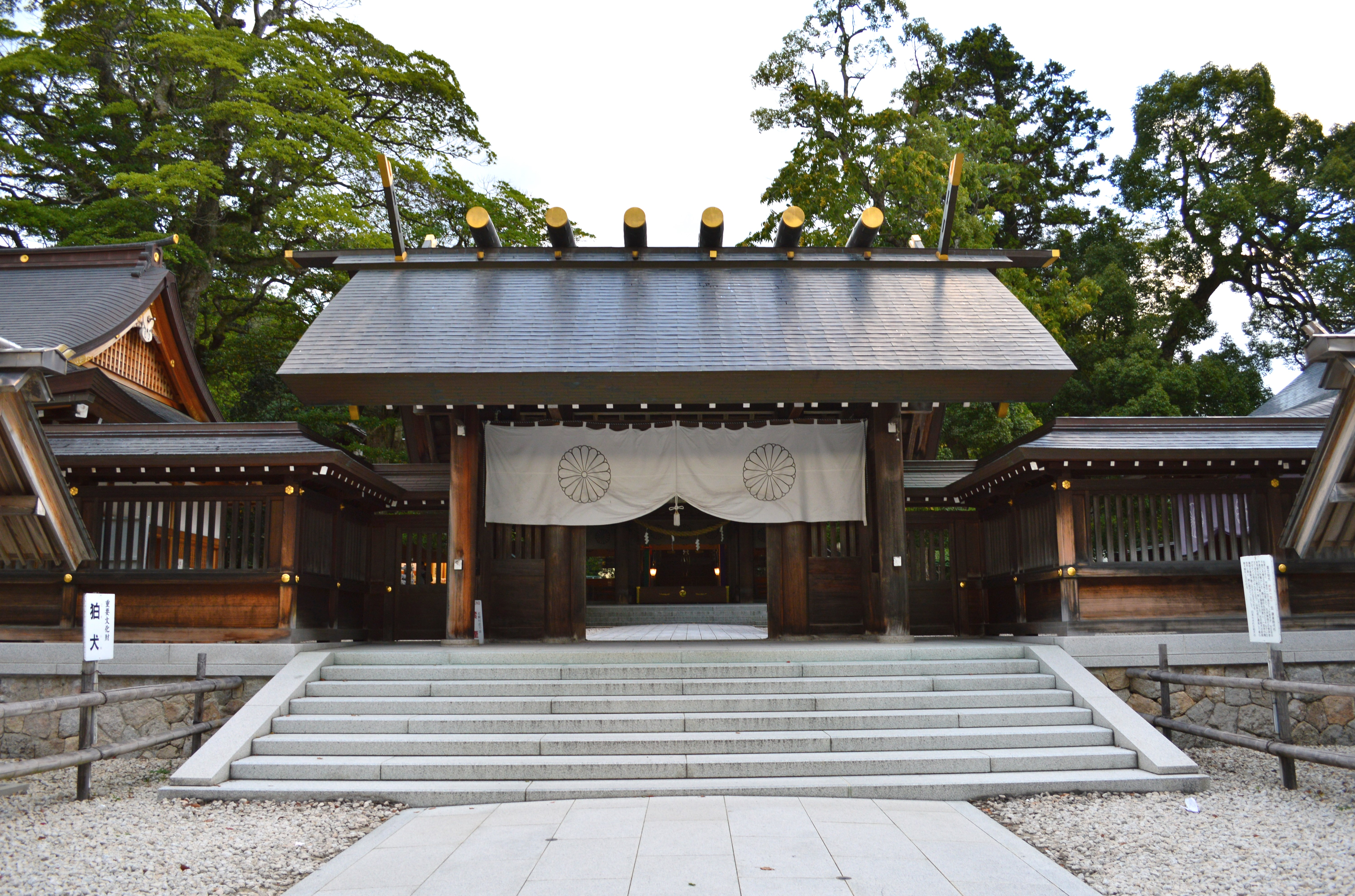
Gate

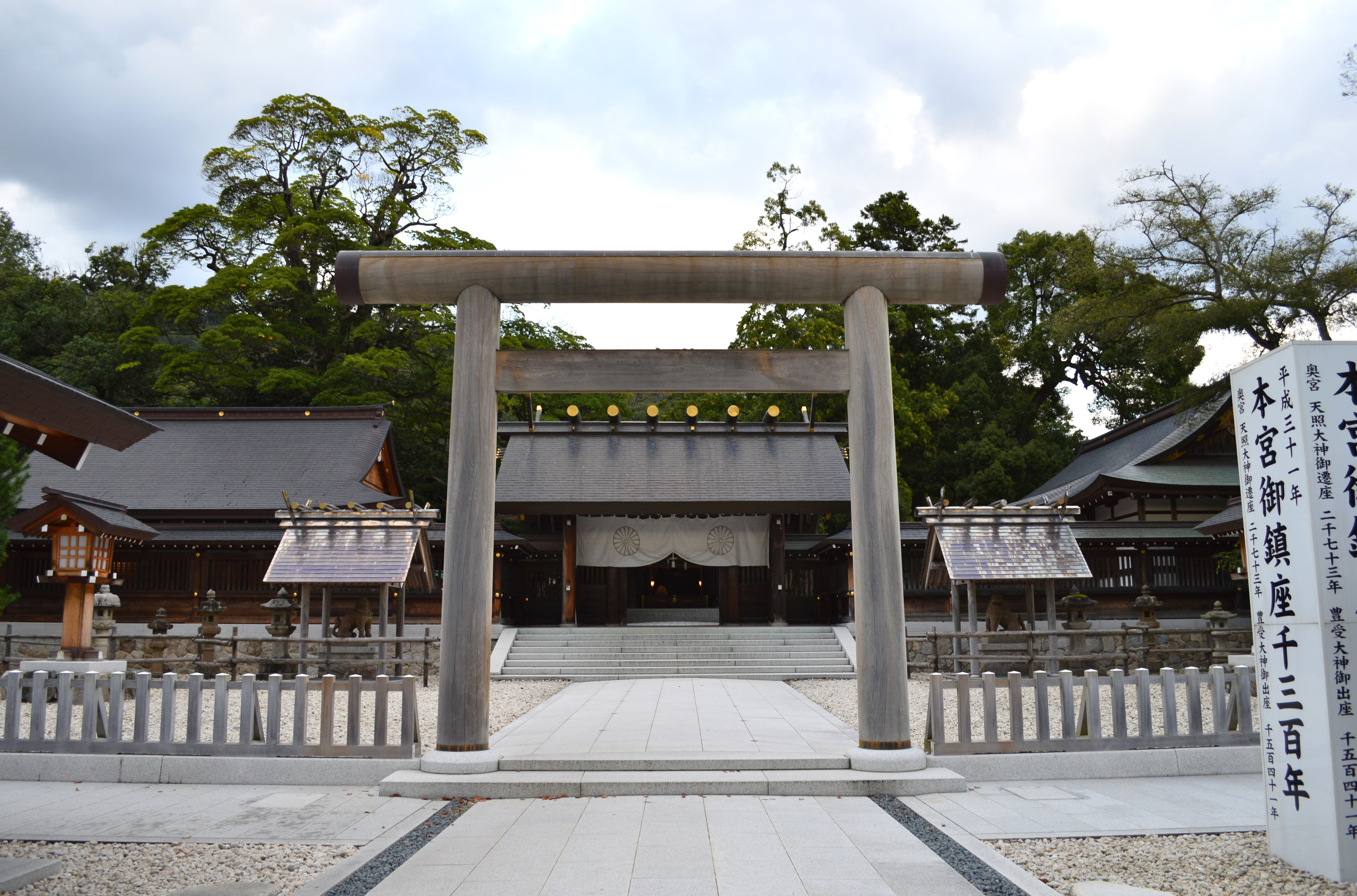
Ni-no-Torii

== See also ==
- List of Shinto shrines
- List of National Treasures of Japan (ancient documents)
- Ichinomiya
