= Miyazu Bay =

Bay north of Miyazu, Kyoto Prefecture, Japan

- Location within Japan
- Coordinates: 35°34′35″N 135°12′55″E
- Ocean/sea sources: Pacific Ocean
- Basin countries: Japan

Miyazu Bay (宮津湾, Miyazu-wan) is a bay located at the western end of Wakasa Bay in the Sea of Japan. It is located in the north of the city of Miyazu, Kyoto Prefecture, and is poured by Otegawa. It is 9.2 km (6 mi) north-south, 2–3 km (1–2 mi) east-west and its water depth is 10-20 meters.

== Geography ==
Miyazu Bay is an inner bay between the Tango Peninsula and the Kurita Peninsula. It is separated from the Aso Bay in the inland sea by Amanohashidate, one of the three most scenic spots in Japan. It was created by the Sea of Japan. Miyazu Bay and the Aso Bay are connected only by a narrow waterway. The eastern shore of Miyazu Bay is a rocky coast, but the west coast has a well-developed sandy beach.

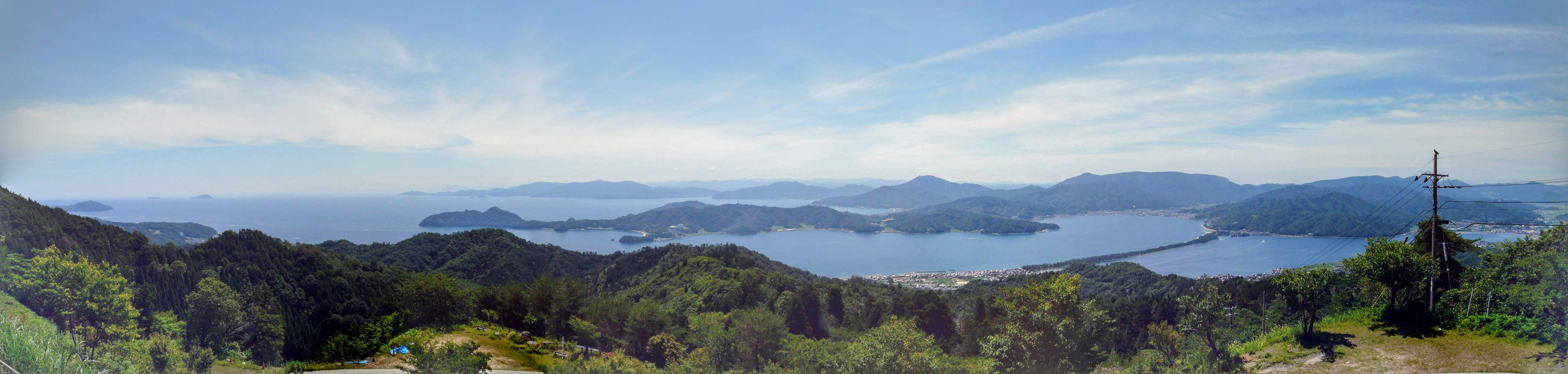
Miyazu Bay seen from the observatory of Nariai-ji Temple
